= List of earthquakes in 2024 =

Earthquakes in 2024
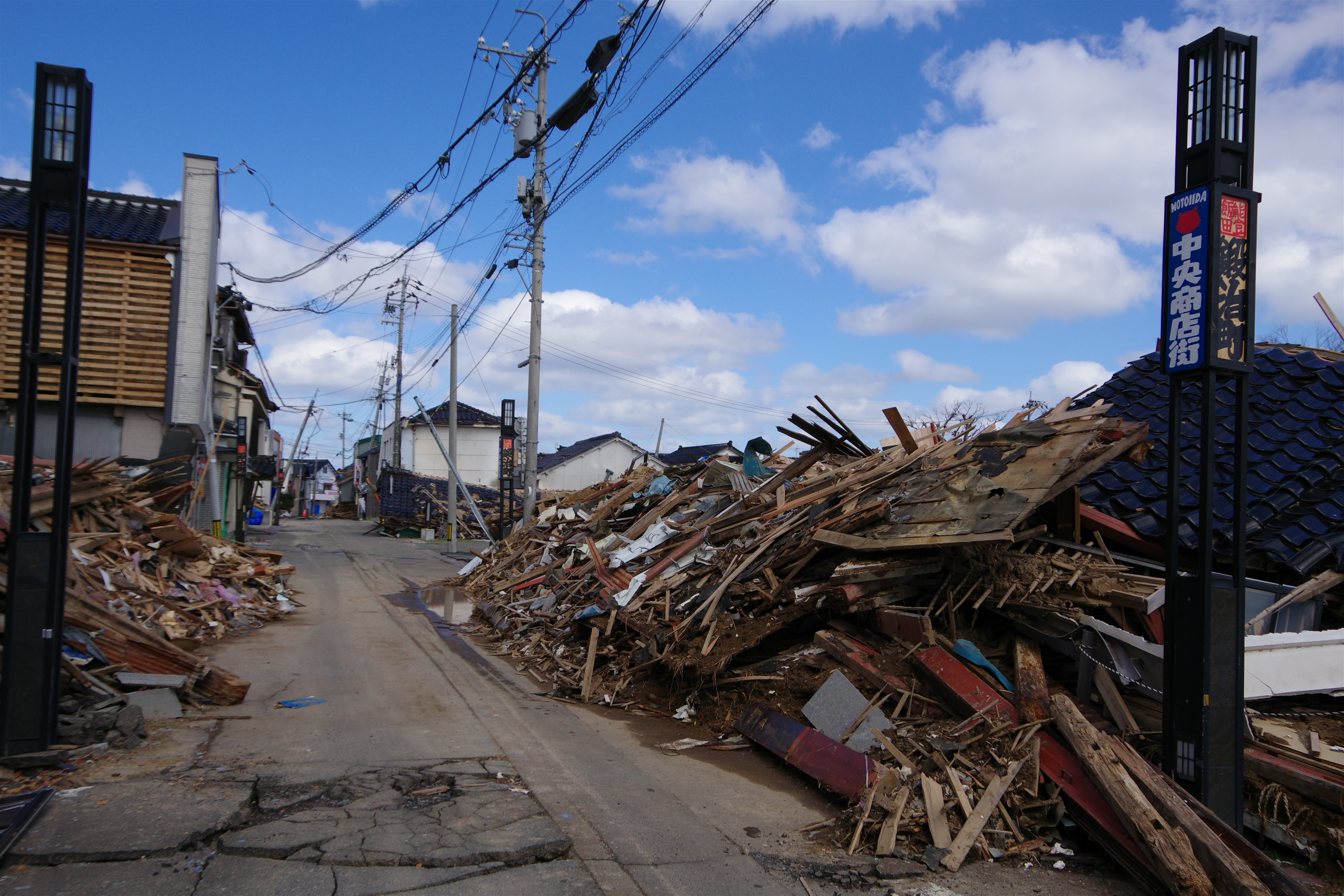
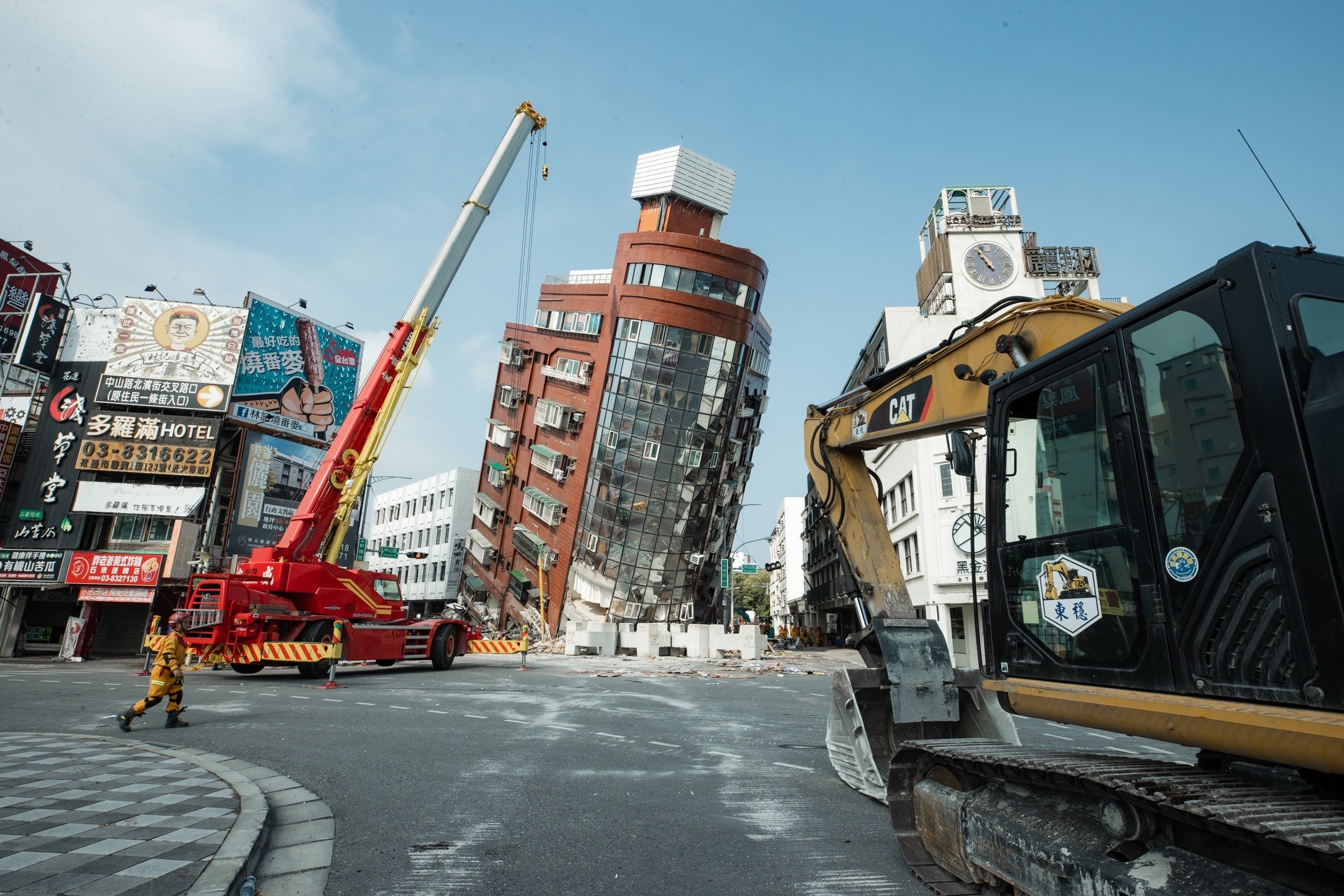
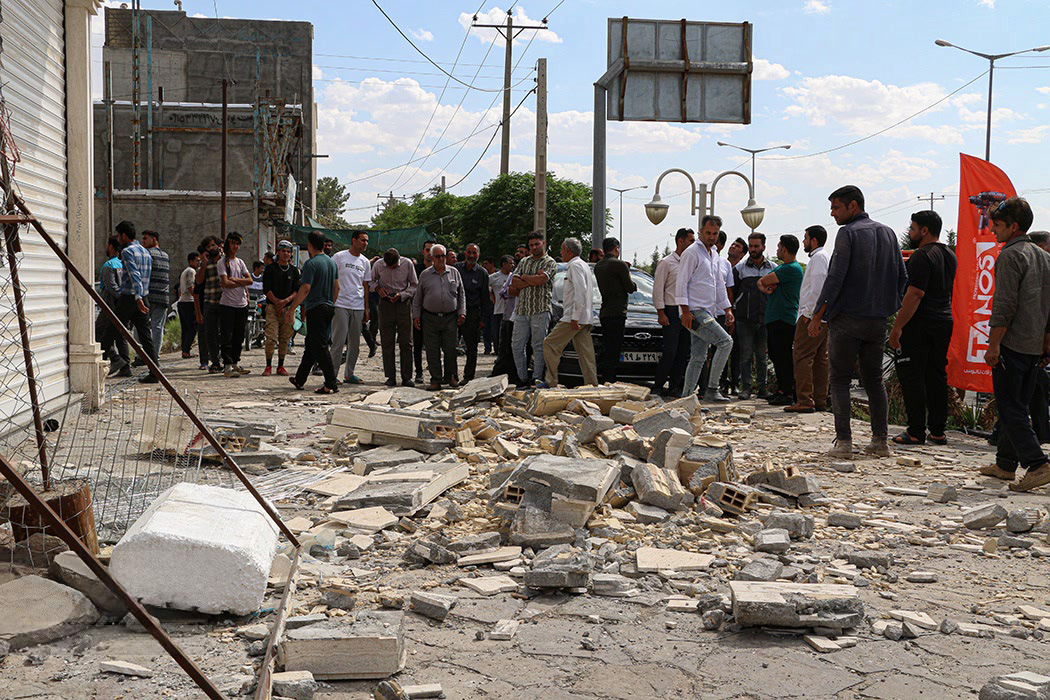
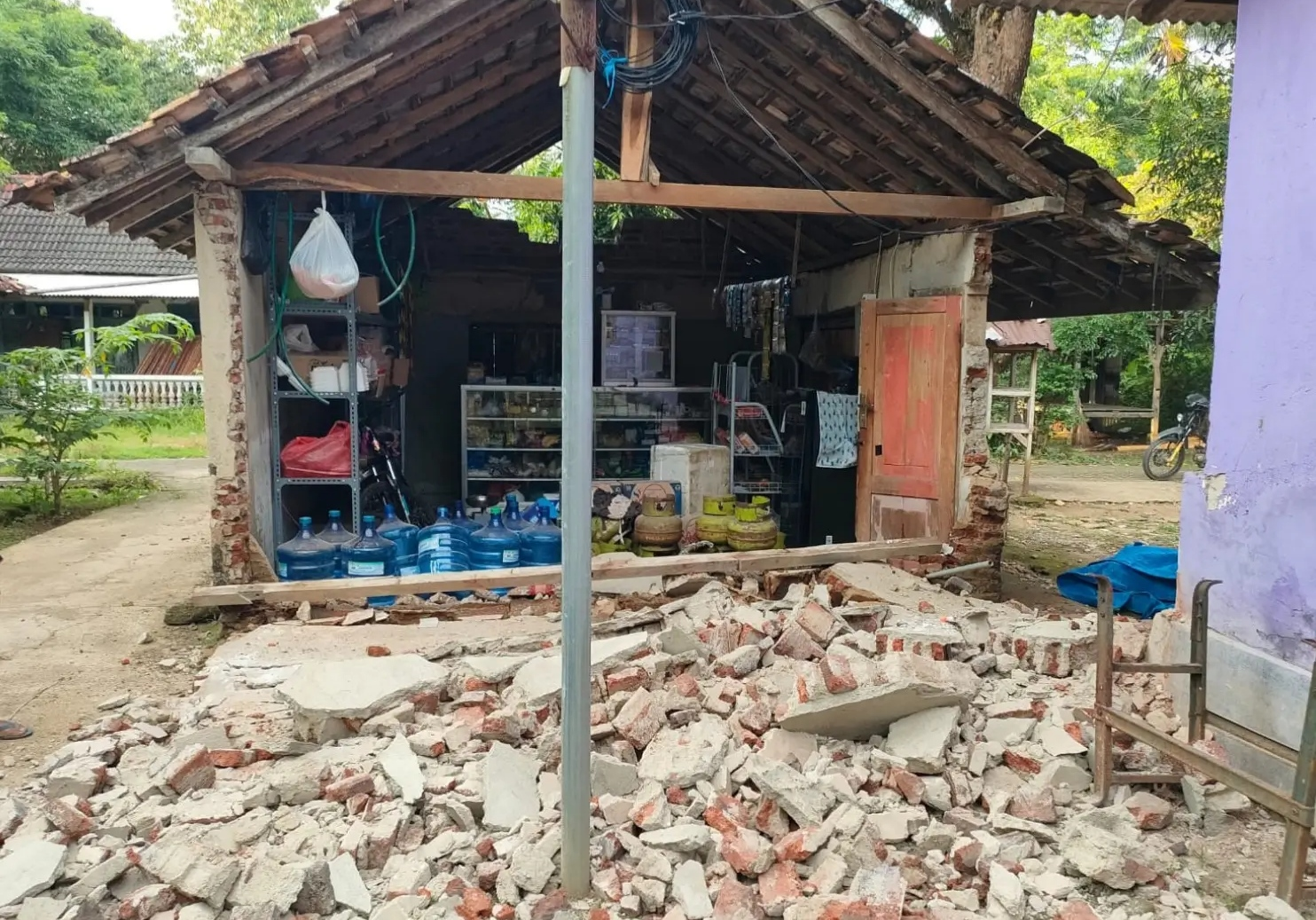
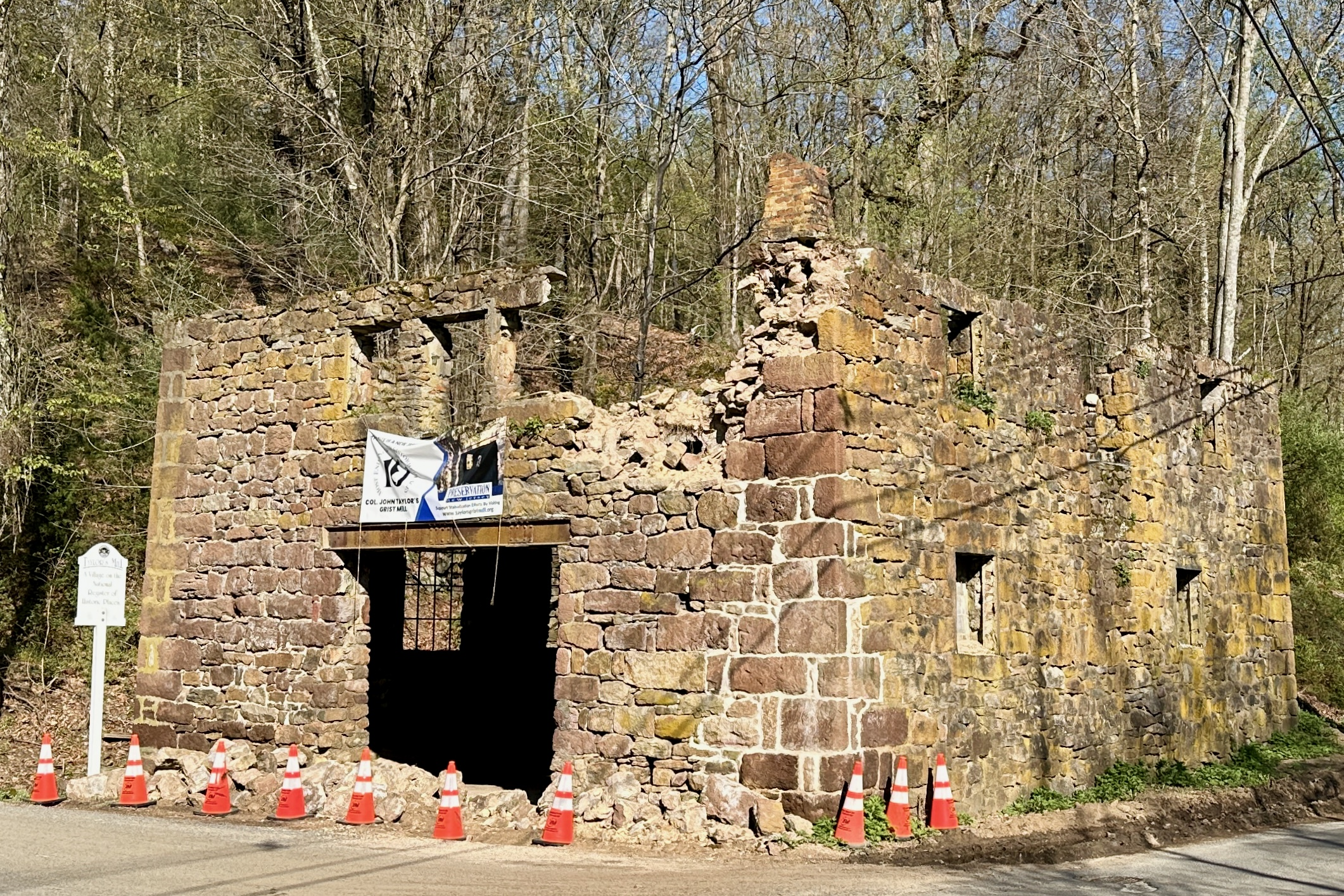
- From top, left to right: Suzu, Japan, after the 2024 Noto earthquake • The Uranus Building in Taiwan after the 2024 Hualien earthquake • A pavement blocked by building debris in Kashmar, Iran on June 18 • Damaged house in Tuban, Indonesia on March 22 • Taylor's Mill after the 2024 New Jersey earthquake

Approximate epicenters of notable earthquakes in 2024
- 4.0–5.9 magnitude
- 6.0–6.9 magnitude
- 7.0–7.9 magnitude
- 8.0+ magnitude
- Strongest: 7.5 M_{w} Japan
- Deadliest: 7.5 M_{w} Japan; 761 deaths
- Total fatalities: 819

Number by magnitude
- 9.0+: 0
- 8.0–8.9: 0
- 7.0–7.9: 10
- 6.0–6.9: 89
- 5.0–5.9: 1,408
- 4.0–4.9: 12,668

This is a list of earthquakes in 2024. Only earthquakes of magnitude 6 or above are included, unless they result in significant damage and/or casualties. All dates are listed according to UTC time. The maximum intensities are based on the Modified Mercalli intensity scale. Earthquake magnitudes are based on data from the USGS.

Seismic activity during the year 2024 was much lower than the rest of the 21st century, with only 99 earthquakes exceeding magnitude six, the lowest since 1982. There were also no earthquakes exceeding ≥M8 for the third year in a row. Throughout the year, earthquakes killed more than 800 people; the vast majority of the fatalities were attributed to a M_{w} 7.5 earthquake that struck the west coast of Honshu in Japan. It was also the strongest event of the year and the deadliest in the country since 2011. Other notable and deadly earthquakes occurred in Taiwan, Indonesia, Papua New Guinea, China, the United States and Vanuatu.

== Compared to other years ==
Number of earthquakes worldwide for 2014–2024 []
Magnitude	2014	2015	2016	2017	2018	2019	2020	2021	2022	2023	2024
8.0–9.9	1	1	0	1	1	1	0	3	0	0	0
7.0–7.9	11	18	16	6	16	9	9	16	11	19	10
6.0–6.9	143	127	131	104	117	135	112	138	116	128	89
5.0–5.9	1,594	1,425	1,561	1,456	1,688	1,500	1,329	2,070	1,599	1,633	1,408
4.0–4.9	15,817	13,776	13,700	11,541	12,785	11,899	12,513	15,069	14,022	14,450	12,668
Total	17,573	15,351	15,411	13,113	14,614	13,555	13,967	17,297	15,749	16,231	14,176

Map of earthquakes in 2024 - M 5.0 or greater (map data)

== By death toll ==
Rank	Death toll	Magnitude	Location	MMI	Depth (km)	Date	Event
1	761	7.5	Japan, Ishikawa	XI (Extreme)	10.0	January 1	2024 Noto earthquake
2	19	7.4	Taiwan, Hualien	VIII (Severe)	40.0	April 2	2024 Hualien earthquake
3	14	7.3	Vanuatu, Shefa offshore	IX (Violent)	57.1	December 17	2024 Port Vila earthquake

Listed are earthquakes with at least 10 dead.

== By magnitude ==
Rank	Magnitude	Death toll	Location	MMI	Depth (km)	Date	Event
1	7.5	761	Japan, Ishikawa	XI (Extreme)	10.0	January 1	2024 Noto earthquake
2	7.4	19	Taiwan, Hualien	VIII (Severe)	40.0	April 2	2024 Hualien earthquake
2	7.4	1	Chile, Antofagasta	VII (Very strong)	127.3	July 19	-
4	7.3	14	Vanuatu, Shefa offshore	IX (Violent)	57.1	December 17	2024 Port Vila earthquake
5	7.2	0	Peru, Arequipa offshore	VI (Strong)	24.0	June 28	-
6	7.1	0	Japan, Miyazaki offshore	VIII (Severe)	24.0	August 8	2024 Hyūga-nada earthquake
6	7.1	0	Philippines, Soccsksargen offshore	III (Weak)	639.5	July 11	-
8	7.0	3	China, Xinjiang	IX (Violent)	13.0	January 22	2024 Uqturpan earthquake
8	7.0	0	United States, California offshore	VIII (Severe)	10.0	December 5	-
8	7.0	0	Russia, Kamchatka Krai offshore	VI (Strong)	29.0	August 17	-

Listed are earthquakes with at least 7.0 magnitude.

== By month ==
=== January ===
January
- Strongest: 7.5 M_{w} Japan
- Deadliest: 7.5 M_{w} Japan; 761 deaths
- Total fatalities: 766

Number by magnitude
- 9.0+: 0
- 8.0–8.9: 0
- 7.0–7.9: 2
- 6.0–6.9: 10
- 5.0–5.9: 121
- 4.0–4.9: 1,256

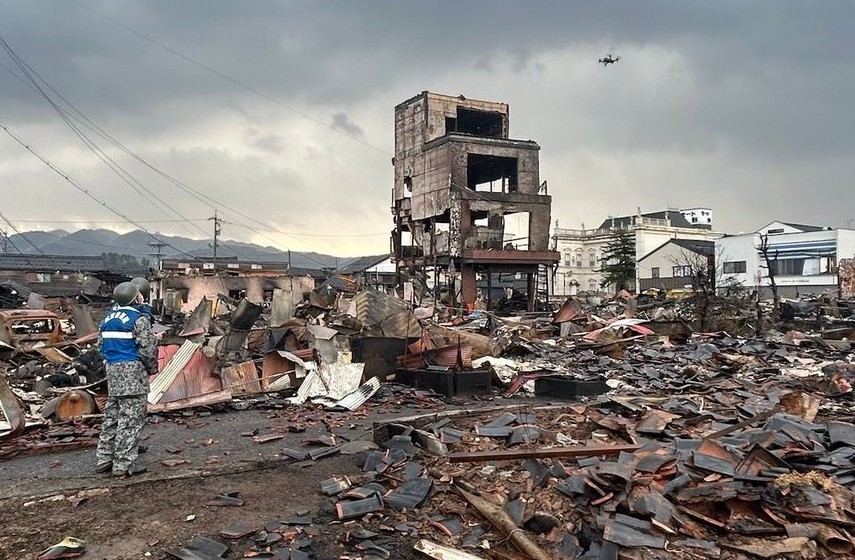
Aftermath of the earthquake and subsequent fires in Wajima, Japan

Date	Country and location	M_{w}	Depth (km)	MMI	Notes	Casualties	
Date	Country and location	M_{w}	Depth (km)	MMI	Notes	Dead	Injured
1	Japan, Ishikawa, 43 km (27 mi) NE of Anamizu	7.5	10.0	XI	Further information: 2024 Noto earthquake	761	1,410
1	Japan, Ishikawa, 8 km (5.0 mi) SW of Anamizu	6.2	10.0	VII	Aftershock of the 7.5 earthquake nine minutes prior.	-	-
1	Indonesia, West Java, 25 km (16 mi) NE of Lembang	4.5	10.0	V	Sixty-nine homes destroyed and 416 structures damaged in the Sumedang area.	-	-
3	Indonesia, West Java offshore, 44 km (27 mi) SW of Pelabuhanratu	4.8	99.0	VI	Four homes collapsed; 17 others and three schools damaged in the Lebak, Sukabumi, and Bogor areas.	-	-
3	Poland, Lower Silesia, 3 km (1.9 mi) SSW of Rudna	4.2	5.0	V	Six people injured due to a mine collapse in Lubin.	-	6
8	Indonesia, North Sulawesi offshore, 93 km (58 mi) SE of Sarangani, Philippines	6.7	62.6	VI	One home destroyed and seven others damaged in Talaud Islands Regency.	-	-
11	Afghanistan, Badakhshan, 45 km (28 mi) SSW of Jurm	6.4	204.0	IV	Minor damage to several houses in Jurm.	-	-
13	Albania, Fier, 7 km (4.3 mi) NE of Lushnjë	4.5	28.6	IV	One person died in a fall in Lushnjë.	1	-
18	Indonesia, Central Sulawesi, 91 km (57 mi) ENE of Poso	4.9	10.0	IV	Several homes collapsed in Tojo Una-Una Regency.	-	-
18	Tonga, Vavaʻu offshore, 148 km (92 mi) NW of Fangaleʻounga	6.4	211.0	IV	-	-	-
19	Colombia, Valle del Cauca, 7 km (4.3 mi) E of Cartago	5.6	65.1	VII	One person died of a heart attack in El Águila and one person injured in Ansermanuevo. Many homes and buildings damaged in Valle del Cauca, Quindío, Caldas and Risaralda Departments.	1	1
20	Northern Mariana Islands, Pagan region offshore, 368 km (229 mi) N of Saipan	6.1	184.0	IV	-	-	-
20	Brazil, Amazonas, 123 km (76 mi) NW of Tarauacá	6.6	607.0	III	-	-	-
20	Southwest Indian Ridge	6.2	10.0	-	-	-	-
22	China, Xinjiang, 128 km (80 mi) WNW of Aykol	7.0	13.0	IX	Further information: 2024 Uqturpan earthquake	3	74
23	Vanuatu, Shefa offshore, 39 km (24 mi) SW of Port Vila	6.3	31.0	V	-	-	-
25	Turkey, Adıyaman, 19 km (12 mi) WNW of Sincik	5.0	16.2	VII	Aftershock of the 2023 Turkey–Syria earthquakes. One person injured, one home collapsed and many others damaged in the Akçadağ-Malatya area.	-	1
27	Guatemala, Santa Rosa, 15 km (9.3 mi) W of Taxisco	6.1	90.0	V	Three people injured by a landslide in Sololá Department. One church damaged in San Pablo Jocopilas, one home collapsed in Quetzaltenango, and one building damaged in La Gomera.	-	3
28	Brazil, Acre, 70 km (43 mi) W of Tarauacá	6.5	621.1	II	-	-	-

=== February ===
February
- Strongest: 6.3 M_{w} southern East Pacific Rise
- Deadliest: 2.8 M_{w} Indonesia; 1 death
- Total fatalities: 1

Number by magnitude
- 9.0+: 0
- 8.0–8.9: 0
- 7.0–7.9: 0
- 6.0–6.9: 4
- 5.0–5.9: 100
- 4.0–4.9: 1,042

Date	Country and location	M_{w}	Depth (km)	MMI	Notes	Casualties	
Date	Country and location	M_{w}	Depth (km)	MMI	Notes	Dead	Injured
1	Austria, Lower Austria, Semmering	4.0	5.0	V	Over 100 buildings damaged in the Semmering area.	-	-
7	Philippines, Cagayan Valley, 16 km (9.9 mi) SW of Claveria	5.4	44.0	IV	One home destroyed and 133 others damaged in the Pagudpud-Tadian area.	-	-
9	New Zealand, Kermadec Islands offshore	6.1	13.0	IV	-	-	-
12	Japan, Volcano Islands offshore	6.1	236.0	I	-	-	-
13	Indonesia, South Kalimantan, 25 km (16 mi) NE of Martapura	4.9	13.6	VI	Many homes damaged in Banjar, including some with collapsed roofs or ceilings. One school also damaged in Banjarmasin.	-	-
14	Federated States of Micronesia, Yap offshore, 171 km (106 mi) NNE of Colonia	6.0	14.0	IV	-	-	-
15	Peru, Lima, 13 km (8.1 mi) NNW of Chancay	5.2	67.3	V	Ten homes collapsed in Rimac, two homes seriously damaged in Huaral, and landslides blocked roads in the epicentral area.	-	-
23	southern East Pacific Rise	6.3	10.0	-	-	-	-
25	Indonesia, West Java offshore, 79 km (49 mi) WSW of Pelabuhanratu	5.6	34.0	IV	Three homes collapsed in the Pandeglang-Cianjur area and many others damaged in Lebak.	-	-
28	Indonesia, West Java, 10 km (6.2 mi) NE of Lembang	2.8	10.0	-	One person killed and two others injured by a falling tree. Fourteen homes and a mosque damaged, and ground cracks appeared in the Subang area.	1	2

=== March ===
March
- Strongest: 6.9 M_{w} Papua New Guinea
- Deadliest: 6.9 M_{w} Papua New Guinea; 5 deaths
- Total fatalities: 6

Number by magnitude
- 9.0+: 0
- 8.0–8.9: 0
- 7.0–7.9: 0
- 6.0–6.9: 8
- 5.0–5.9: 114
- 4.0–4.9: 1,000

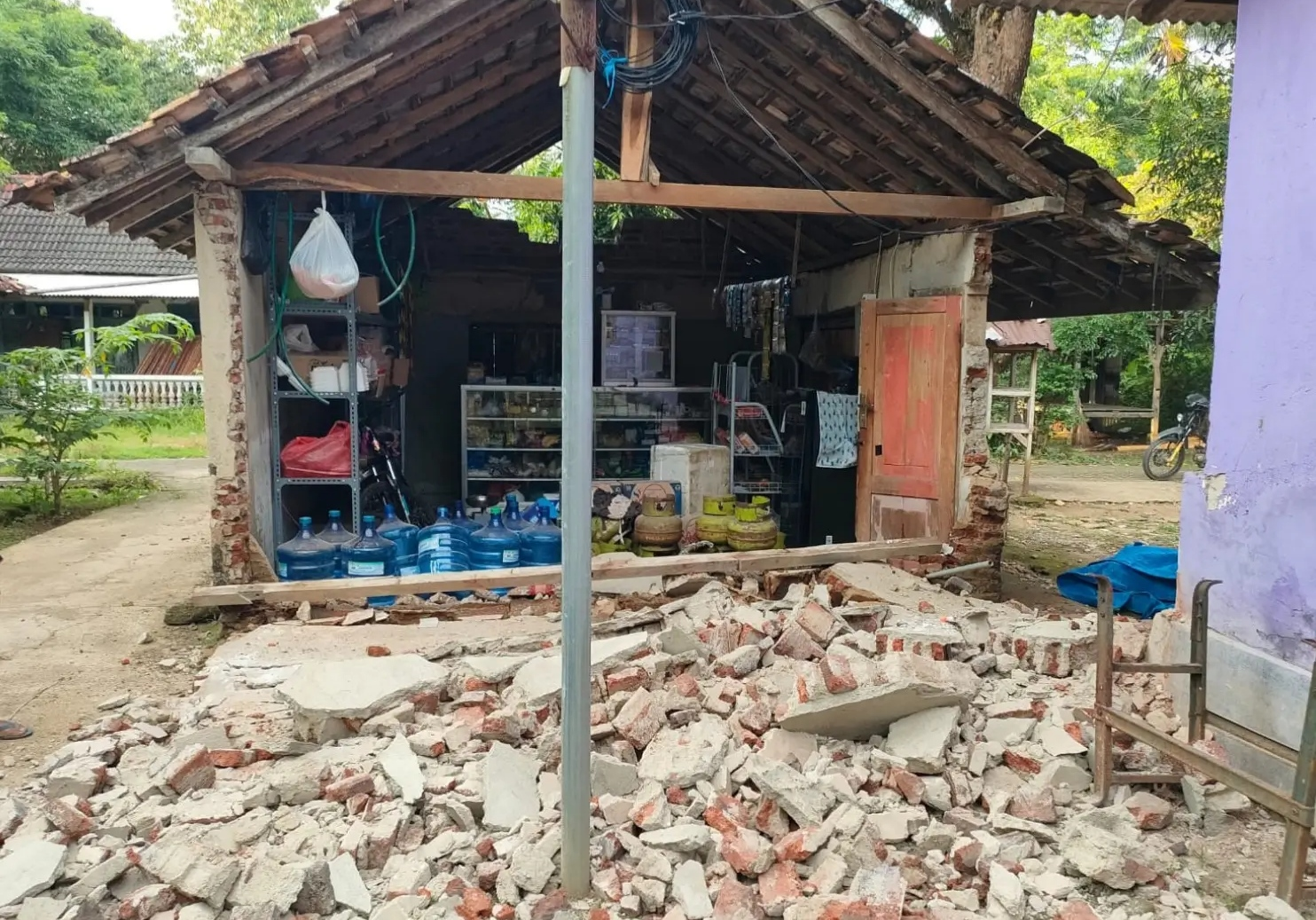
Damage to a home in Tuban, Indonesia.

Date	Country and location	M_{w}	Depth (km)	MMI	Notes	Casualties	
Date	Country and location	M_{w}	Depth (km)	MMI	Notes	Dead	Injured
3	Macquarie Island region	6.8	23.2	V	-	-	-
4	Kyrgyzstan, Issyk-Kul, 25 km (16 mi) NW of Cholpon-Ata	4.7	28.3	VI	One person injured and many buildings damaged in Almaty, Kazakhstan.	-	1
4	Turkey, Çanakkale, 21 km (13 mi) NE of Hamdibey	4.3	15.0	IV	One person killed after jumping from a building in Nilüfer.	1	-
5	Macquarie Island region	6.1	10.0	-	Aftershock of the 6.8 earthquake on 3 March.	-	-
7	Peru, Ica, 10 km (6.2 mi) SSW of Chincha Alta	4.9	40.3	IV	Several structures severely damaged in Pisco and landslides blocked roads in the Humay area.	-	-
8	Philippines, Davao offshore, 103 km (64 mi) SE of Pondaguitan	6.0	115.0	IV	-	-	-
12	Peru, Huancavelica, 22 km (14 mi) NNW of Paucarbamba	4.0	10.0	V	One person injured, one home collapsed and 49 structures damaged in the Tayacaja area.	-	1
13	Papua New Guinea, West New Britain, 68 km (42 mi) ESE of Kimbe	6.0	44.0	VI	-	-	-
14	Montenegro, Plužine, 22 km (14 mi) ENE of Bileća, Bosnia and Herzegovina	5.4	16.1	VI	One barn destroyed and many homes damaged in Golija. Landslides blocked roads in the Nikšić-Krstac area.	-	-
14	northern Mid-Atlantic Ridge	6.2	10.0	-	-	-	-
21	India, Maharashtra, 20 km (12 mi) NNE of Basmat	4.6	10.0	V	Many homes collapsed and many others damaged in the Nanded area.	-	-
22	Indonesia, East Java offshore, 117 km (73 mi) N of Paciran	5.6	10.0	VII	Ten people hospitalized after suffering panic attacks, another injured by falling debris, two houses and a village hall destroyed, and 35 structures damaged in Bawean.	-	11
22	Indonesia, East Java offshore, 110 km (68 mi) N of Paciran	6.4	9.5	VIII	Four people injured, 774 houses destroyed and 4,858 structures damaged in the Bawean-Tuban-Surabaya area.	-	4
23	Indonesia, Bengkulu offshore, 82 km (51 mi) SW of Pagar Alam	5.3	62.7	V	Eight homes collapsed and 110 structures damaged in South Bengkulu Regency.	-	-
23	Papua New Guinea, East Sepik, 36 km (22 mi) ENE of Ambunti	6.9	41.5	VII	Further information: 2024 East Sepik earthquake	5	12
25	Vietnam, Hòa Bình, 27 km (17 mi) S of Xuân Mai	4.2	10.0	V	Many homes damaged or destroyed and landslides in the Mỹ Đức area.	-	-
27	Vanuatu region	6.4	10.0	IV	-	-	-
29	Greece, Peloponnese offshore, 34 km (21 mi) WNW of Filiatra	5.8	26.9	V	Several old homes collapsed and many buildings and bridges damaged in the Zacharo area.	-	-

=== April ===
April
- Strongest: 7.4 M_{w} Taiwan
- Deadliest: 7.4 M_{w} Taiwan; 19 deaths
- Total fatalities: 20

Number by magnitude
- 9.0+: 0
- 8.0–8.9: 0
- 7.0–7.9: 1
- 6.0–6.9: 11
- 5.0–5.9: 169
- 4.0–4.9: 1,367

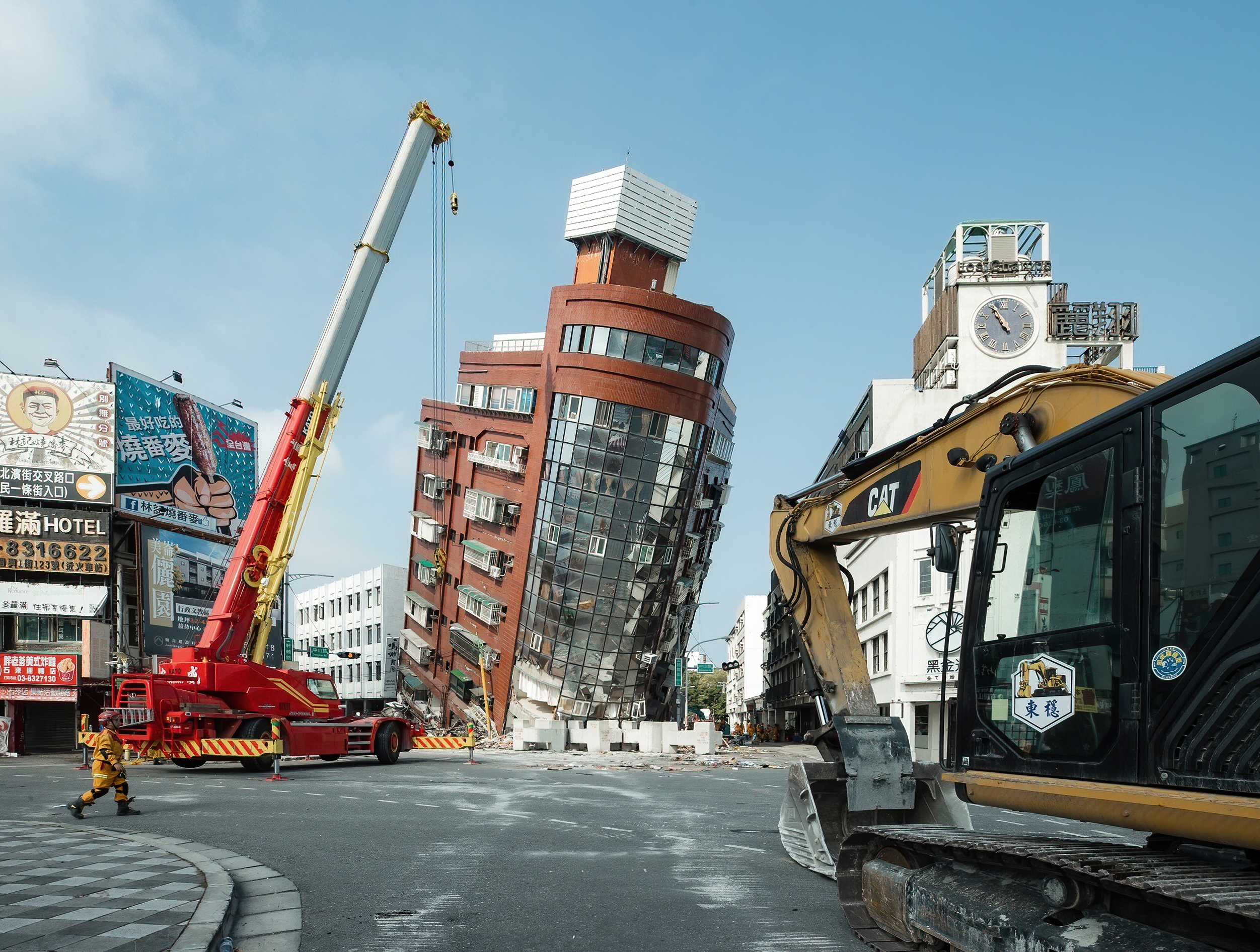
Rescue workers near the collapsed nine-story Uranus building in Hualien City, Taiwan

Date	Country and location	M_{w}	Depth (km)	MMI	Notes	Casualties	
Date	Country and location	M_{w}	Depth (km)	MMI	Notes	Dead	Injured
1	Japan, Iwate, 7 km (4.3 mi) SW of Kuji	5.9	73.0	VI	Two people injured in Aomori Prefecture and several structures damaged in the Kuji area.	-	2
2	Northern Mariana Islands, Saipan offshore, 137 km (85 mi) ENE of Saipan	6.2	10.0	IV	-	–	-
2	Taiwan, Hualien, 15 km (9.3 mi) S of Hualien City	7.4	40.0	VIII	Further information: 2024 Hualien earthquake	19	1,147
3	Taiwan, Hualien offshore, 15 km (9.3 mi) NNE of Hualien City	6.4	13.9	VII	Aftershock of the 7.4 earthquake 13 minutes prior.	-	-
4	Japan, Fukushima, 77 km (48 mi) E of Minami-Sōma	6.1	29.0	IV	-	-	-
5	Northern Mariana Islands, Maug Islands offshore	6.8	222.0	IV	-	-	-
5	United States, New Jersey, 6 km (3.7 mi) ESE of Califon	4.8	4.7	VI	Further information: 2024 New Jersey earthquake	-	-
6	China, Yunnan, 30 km (19 mi) SW of Zhaotong	5.0	10.0	IV	Two homes destroyed and rockfalls occurred in Ludian County.	-	-
9	Indonesia, North Maluku offshore, 150 km (93 mi) NW of Tobelo	6.4	22.0	IV	-	-	-
14	Papua New Guinea, East New Britain, 111 km (69 mi) ESE of Kimbe	6.5	49.0	VI	-	-	-
17	Peru, Cusco, 1 km (0.62 mi) WSW of Oropesa	4.3	10.0	VI	Several homes collapsed, 648 structures damaged and landslides blocked roads in the Lucre area.	-	-
17	Japan, Ehime offshore, 18 km (11 mi) W of Uwajima	6.3	32.0	VIII	Sixteen people injured, 10 homes damaged, power poles toppled, landslides reported and water pipes damaged in Ōita, Ehime, Hiroshima and Kōchi Prefectures. A reactor fitting at the Ikata Nuclear Power Plant fell off.	-	16
18	Turkey, Yozgat, 11 km (6.8 mi) W of Sulusaray	5.6	16.0	VII	Five people injured, 20 houses and two minarets destroyed and 283 buildings damaged in Tokat Province. One building collapsed and 169 others damaged in Yozgat Province.	-	5
22	Taiwan, Hualien offshore, 29 km (18 mi) S of Hualien City	6.1	9.0	VII	Aftershocks of the 2024 Hualien earthquake. Five buildings destroyed in Hualien County; two in Hualien City, two in Ji'an and another in Shoufeng.	-	-
22	Taiwan, Hualien offshore, 13 km (8.1 mi) SSW of Hualien City	6.1	10.0	VIII	Aftershocks of the 2024 Hualien earthquake. Five buildings destroyed in Hualien County; two in Hualien City, two in Ji'an and another in Shoufeng.	-	-
27	Japan, Bonin Islands offshore	6.5	496.0	II	-	-	-
27	Indonesia, West Java offshore, 91 km (57 mi) S of Banjar	6.1	59.7	V	One person died of a heart attack in Bandung. Six people injured, 16 structures collapsed and 496 others damaged in Garut Regency; three people injured and 24 houses damaged in Bandung Regency; two people injured, two structures collapsed and 117 others damaged in Ciamis Regency; one person injured, 13 houses collapsed, 28 others, two schools, a hospital and five mosques damaged, and power outages in Tasikmalaya; one home destroyed and 17 others damaged in Sukabumi; three homes and one school damaged in Cianjur Regency; three buildings damaged in Cimahi; 17 homes damaged in Majalengka Regency and ten houses damaged in Bogor Regency.	1	12
30	Peru, Cusco, 10 km (6.2 mi) SW of Urcos	4.8	91.1	IV	Seven people injured, two homes collapsed, 752 others and nine buildings, including a church damaged in the Acomayo-Paucartambo-Quispicanchi area.	-	7

=== May ===
May
- Strongest: 6.6 M_{w} Tonga
- Total fatalities: 0

Number by magnitude
- 9.0+: 0
- 8.0–8.9: 0
- 7.0–7.9: 0
- 6.0–6.9: 8
- 5.0–5.9: 121
- 4.0–4.9: 1,079

Date	Country and location	M_{w}	Depth (km)	MMI	Notes	Casualties	
Date	Country and location	M_{w}	Depth (km)	MMI	Notes	Dead	Injured
3	Philippines, Eastern Visayas offshore, 27 km (17 mi) SSW of Balangiga	5.7	10.2	V	Two people injured in Dulag.	-	2
5	Indonesia, Maluku offshore, 154 km (96 mi) WSW of Fakfak	6.1	16.0	VI	-	-	-
8	Vanuatu, Penama offshore, 101 km (63 mi) ENE of Luganville	6.1	19.2	VI	-	-	-
11	Iran, Fars, 70 km (43 mi) SW of Gerash	4.8	10.0	VI	Two people injured, three homes destroyed and 300 others damaged in the Ahel area.	-	2
12	Mexico, Chiapas offshore, 28 km (17 mi) WSW of Brisas Barra de Suchiate	6.4	61.9	VI	Minor damage and landslides in Tapachula. Several homes collapsed, three structures damaged and landslides in the San Marcos-Quetzaltenango area, Guatemala.	-	-
14	Indonesia, West Nusa Tenggara offshore, 15 km (9.3 mi) NNW of Gili Trawangan	5.3	22.8	V	One person injured and three homes collapsed in Tanjung. One home collapsed and a wantilan damaged in Karangasem Regency.	-	1
19	United States, Alaska offshore, 169 km (105 mi) SW of Nikolski	6.0	28.0	IV	-	-	-
25	Vanuatu, Shefa offshore, 83 km (52 mi) NW of Port Vila	6.3	22.0	V	-	-	-
26	Tonga, Ha‘apai offshore, 70 km (43 mi) NW of Fangaleʻounga	6.6	137.0	VI	-	-	-
30	Indonesia, Central Sulawesi offshore, 148 km (92 mi) NNW of Kendari	5.0	10.0	IV	Five people injured, one home collapsed and 36 buildings damaged in the Morowali area.	-	5
31	South Africa offshore, Prince Edward Islands region	6.2	10.0	-	-	-	-
31	New Zealand, Kermadec Islands offshore	6.2	16.0	IV	-	-	-

=== June ===
June
- Strongest: 7.2 M_{w} Peru
- Deadliest: 4.9 M_{w} Iran; 4 deaths
- Total fatalities: 4

Number by magnitude
- 9.0+: 0
- 8.0–8.9: 0
- 7.0–7.9: 1
- 6.0–6.9: 6
- 5.0–5.9: 102
- 4.0–4.9: 1,000

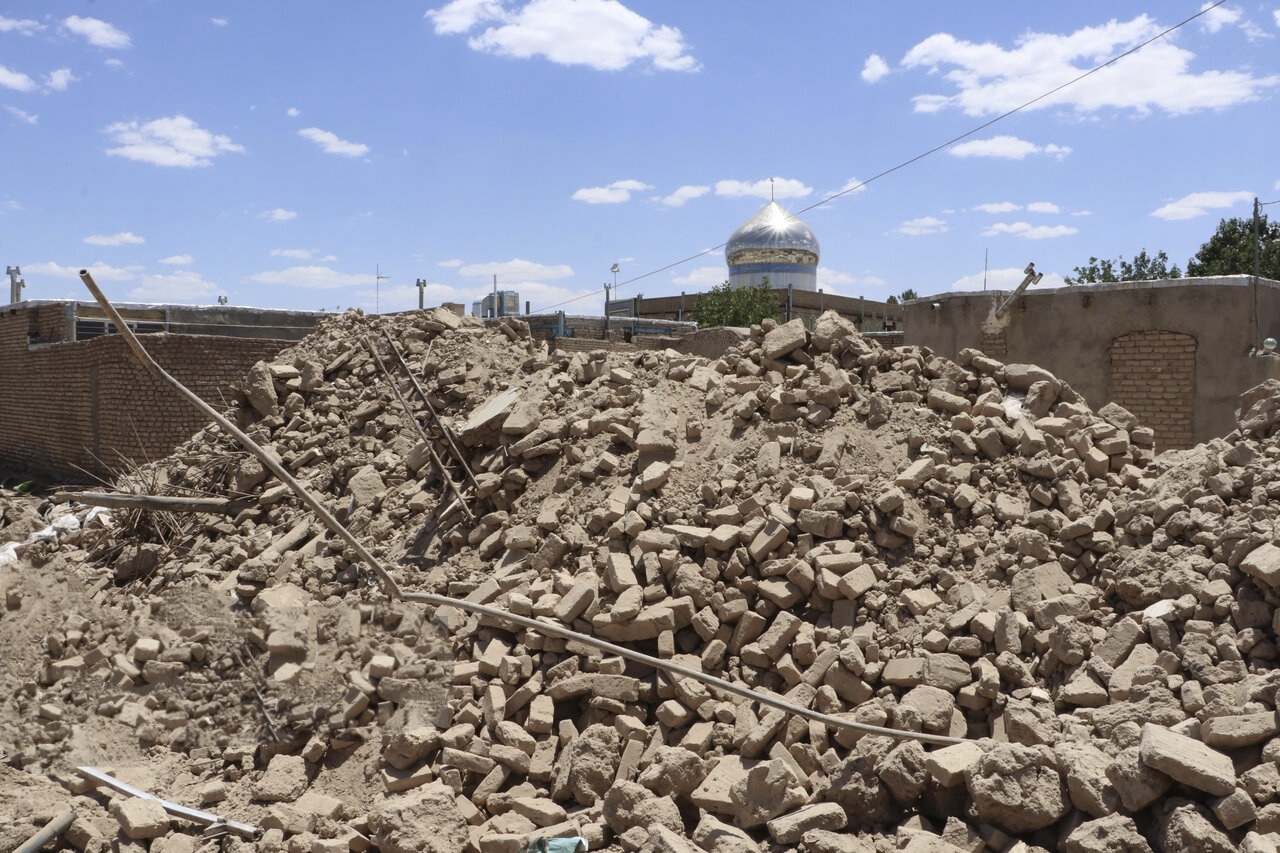
Ruined houses in Zendeh Jan, Iran

Date	Country and location	M_{w}	Depth (km)	MMI	Notes	Casualties	
Date	Country and location	M_{w}	Depth (km)	MMI	Notes	Dead	Injured
2	Japan, Ishikawa, 40 km (25 mi) NE of Anamizu	5.7	9.0	VIII	Aftershock of the 2024 Noto earthquake. Three people injured; two in Ishikawa and another in Toyama. Six houses collapsed in Wajima and four buildings damaged in Niigata.	-	3
5	Angola, Benguela, 87 km (54 mi) W of Caconda	5.1	10.0	VII	Largest earthquake in Angola since 2001. Forty-three people hospitalized and several buildings damaged in the Benguela-Huambo area.	-	43
9	Pacific-Antarctic Ridge	6.2	10.0	I	-	-	-
11	South Korea, North Jeolla, 3 km (1.9 mi) NW of Puan	4.4	10.0	VII	At least 285 structures damaged in the Buan–Gochang area, including one severely damaged temple.	-	-
16	west of Macquarie Island	6.0	7.7	-	-	-	-
16	Peru, Arequipa offshore, 10 km (6.2 mi) SW of Atiquipa	6.0	27.0	VI	Foreshock of the 7.2 earthquake on June 28. One child injured while evacuating in Camaná. Some houses collapsed and landslides in the Caravelí-Yauca area, some of which blocked sections of the Pan-American Highway. One stadium and a school damaged in Chala, and additional damage reported in Atiquipa.	-	1
18	Iran, Razavi Khorasan, 6 km (3.7 mi) SE of Kashmar	4.9	10.0	VIII	Four people killed, 120 others injured, 300 houses destroyed, 600 others and several historical buildings damaged in the Kashmar-Zendeh Jan area.	4	120
23	Venezuela, Sucre, 20 km (12 mi) NE of Yaguaraparo	6.0	77.0	VI	Some buildings damaged in the epicentral area and one building damaged in Ciudad Guayana. Power outages occurred in parts of Trinidad and Tobago.	-	-
24	Vanuatu, Sanma offshore, 49 km (30 mi) NNE of Port-Olry	6.3	149.0	IV	-	-	-
24	Turkey, Manisa, 11 km (6.8 mi) NNW of Soma	4.7	11.8	III	One person injured in Savaştepe.	-	1
28	Peru, Arequipa offshore, 10 km (6.2 mi) WSW of Atiquipa	7.2	24.0	VI	Thirty people injured, 11 houses destroyed, 3,000 others, six schools, five health centers and two bridges damaged and power outages in Caravelí Province, Arequipa. Twelve people injured and 10 houses destroyed in the Santiago-Changuillo area, Ica. Some houses destroyed, 11 health facilities damaged and rockfalls in Ayacucho. One health center damaged in Lima. A tsunami with a height of 20 cm (7.9 in) was recorded in the Chala area.	-	42
29	Peru, Arequipa offshore, 34 km (21 mi) SW of Atiquipa	6.1	18.0	VI	Aftershock of the 7.2 earthquake on 28 June.	-	-

=== July ===
July
- Strongest: 7.4 M_{w} Chile
- Deadliest: 2.9 M_{w} Poland; 1 death 7.4 M_{w} Chile; 1 death
- Total fatalities: 2

Number by magnitude
- 9.0+: 0
- 8.0–8.9: 0
- 7.0–7.9: 2
- 6.0–6.9: 7
- 5.0–5.9: 105
- 4.0–4.9: 982

Date	Country and location	M_{w}	Depth (km)	MMI	Notes	Casualties	
Date	Country and location	M_{w}	Depth (km)	MMI	Notes	Dead	Injured
1	Ecuador, Pichincha, 8 km (5.0 mi) northeast of Oyambarillo	4.4	10.0	V	One person injured, two structures collapsed, two others damaged, landslides and power outages occurred in the Quito area.	-	1
7	Indonesia, Central Java offshore, 7 km (4.3 mi) east-northeast of Pekalongan	4.5	11.1	VI	Thirteen people injured, 13 houses destroyed and 287 buildings damaged in the Batang-Pekalongan area.	-	13
7	Japan, Bonin Islands offshore	6.2	546.0	II	-	-	-
10	south of Africa	6.6	4.0	-	-	-	-
11	Philippines, Soccsksargen offshore, 106 km (66 mi) west-southwest of Sangay	7.1	639.5	III	-	-	-
11	Turkey, Afyonkarahisar, 2 km (1.2 mi) south-southeast of Afyonkarahisar	4.3	10.0	V	One home collapsed in Kalecik and a road damaged at Değirmenayvalı.	-	-
11	Poland, Silesian Voivodeship, 4 km (2.5 mi) north of Jejkowice	2.9	5.0	III	One miner killed and 17 others injured due to a mine collapse in Rydułtowy.	1	17
11	Canada, British Columbia offshore, 209 km (130 mi) west-southwest of Tofino	6.4	10.0	IV	-	-	-
19	Chile, Antofagasta, 41 km (25 mi) east-southeast of San Pedro de Atacama	7.4	127.3	VII	One person killed in Calama. Minor damage to buildings in the epicentral area, power outages and landslides occurred in San Pedro de Atacama and one bridge damaged in Quillagua. Some buildings damaged in the Cochabamba-Santa Cruz de la Sierra-Sucre area, Bolivia.	1	-
19	United States, Alaska offshore, 168 km (104 mi) southwest of Nikolski	6.0	41.0	IV	-	-	-
21	Guatemala, Jalapa, 6 km (3.7 mi) east of Jalapa	6.2	272.0	IV	-	-	-
22	Vanuatu, Malampa offshore, 99 km (62 mi) northeast of Norsup	6.1	4.0	VII	-	-	-
25	Indonesia, West Java, 12 km (7.5 mi) south-southwest of Sumber	4.4	12.8	V	Three homes and a mosque collapsed and 36 homes damaged in the Kuningan area.	-	-
25	Iran, Kermanshah, 51 km (32 mi) east-southeast of Sarpol-e Zahab	4.8	10.0	V	One person injured and several buildings damaged in Dalaho County.	-	1
29	Tonga, Haʻapai offshore, 73 km (45 mi) south-southeast of Pangai	6.0	9.0	IV	-	-	-
29	Iran, Sistan and Balochistan, 31 km (19 mi) south-southeast of Fannuj	4.7	10.0	V	More than 400 homes destroyed in Nikshahr County.	-	-

=== August ===
August
- Strongest: 7.1 M_{w} Japan
- Deadliest: 5.2 M_{w} Syria; 2 deaths
- Total fatalities: 3

Number by magnitude
- 9.0+: 0
- 8.0–8.9: 0
- 7.0–7.9: 2
- 6.0–6.9: 8
- 5.0–5.9: 95
- 4.0–4.9: 1,002

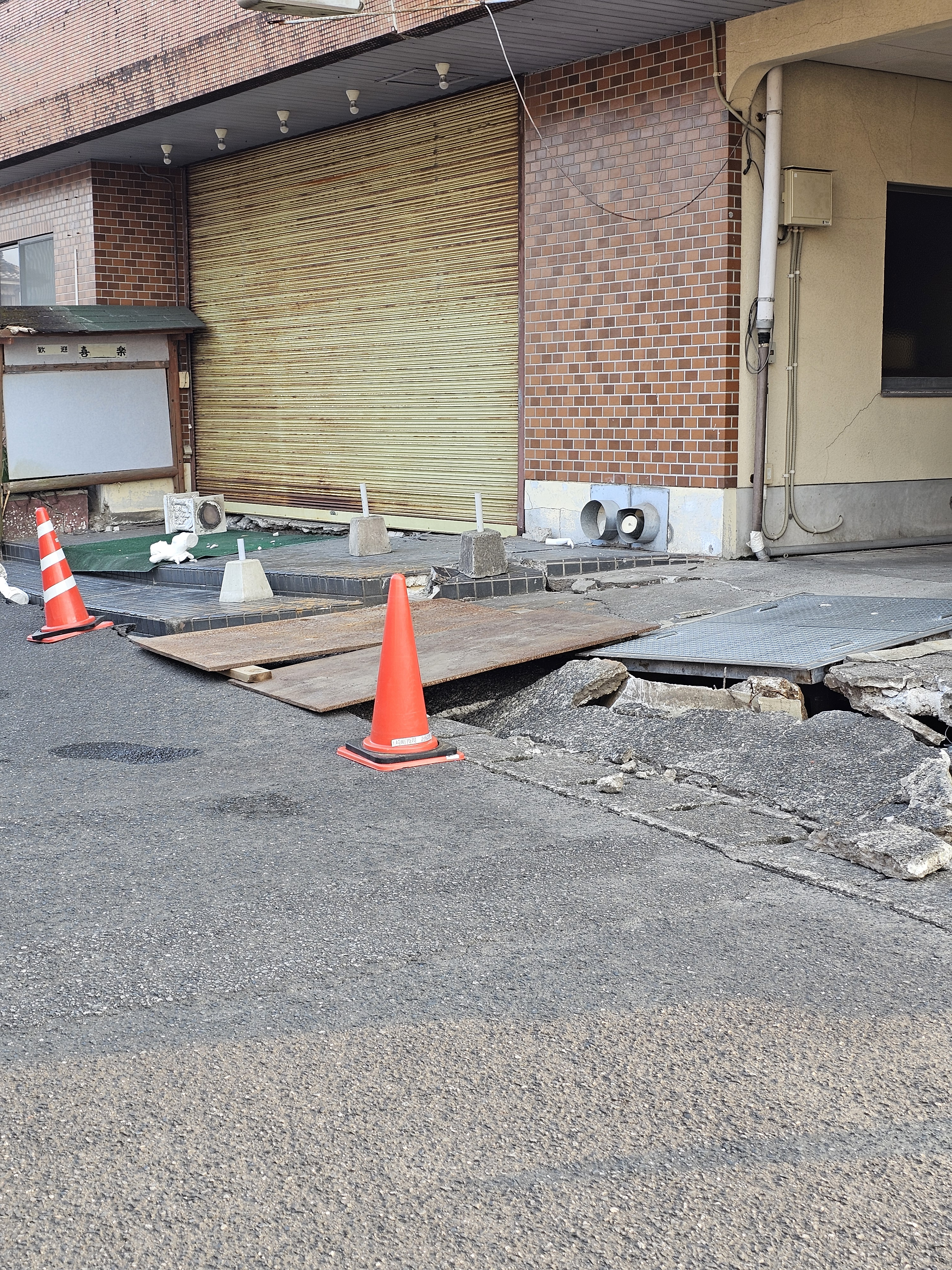
Subsidence at Kagoshima Prefecture, Japan

Date	Country and location	M_{w}	Depth (km)	MMI	Notes	Casualties	
Date	Country and location	M_{w}	Depth (km)	MMI	Notes	Dead	Injured
2	Philippines, Caraga offshore, 20 km (12 mi) E of Barcelona	6.8	32.0	VII	Aftershock of the December 2023 Mindanao earthquake. Seven homes destroyed and 232 others damaged in the Lingig-Hinatuan area.	-	-
3	Philippines, Caraga offshore, 44 km (27 mi) E of Barcelona	6.3	15.0	VI	Aftershock of the 6.8 earthquake six hours earlier.	-	-
4	Indonesia, West Java, 26 km (16 mi) SW of Bogor	3.5	10.0	-	Three homes destroyed and 62 others damaged in Bogor Regency.	-	-
8	Japan, Miyazaki offshore, 19 km (12 mi) SSE of Miyazaki	7.1	24.0	VIII	Further information: 2024 Hyūga-nada earthquake	-	16
9	Japan, Kanagawa, 1 km (0.62 mi) N of Isehara	5.0	30.3	VI	Three people injured and water supply outages occurred in the Isehara-Matsuda-Yokosuka area.	-	3
10	Russia, Sakhalin offshore, 151 km (94 mi) E of Dolinsk	6.5	402.2	III	-	-	-
11	Armenia, Gegharkunik, 4 km (2.5 mi) SSW of Lanjaghbyur	4.2	0.7	VII	Some buildings collapsed and 82 others damaged in the Yeranos area.	-	-
12	Syria, Hama, 12 km (7.5 mi) NNW of As Salamīyah	5.2	7.3	VI	One person killed in Afrin and another in Salamiyah. At least 132 others hospitalized and many buildings damaged or destroyed in Salamiyah. Some homes collapsed and several more damaged in the Beirut area, Lebanon.	2	132
12	Peru, Cusco, 5 km (3.1 mi) SSE of Caicay	4.7	35.0	IV	Some homes collapsed, several others damaged and rockfalls occurred in the Lucre area.	-	-
15	Taiwan, Hualien offshore, 30 km (19 mi) SSE of Hualien City	6.1	14.0	VI	Aftershock of the 2024 Hualien earthquake. Landslides occurred and two people rescued from elevators in Hualien County.	-	-
16	Syria, Hama, 5 km (3.1 mi) NNW of As Salamīyah	4.8	10.0	IV	Aftershock of the 5.0 earthquake on 12 August. Seventeen people injured in Salamiyah.	-	17
17	Russia, Kamchatka Krai offshore, 102 km (63 mi) E of Petropavlovsk-Kamchatsky	7.0	29.0	VI	At least 22 buildings damaged and a 25 cm (0.82 ft) tsunami was observed.	-	-
19	Philippines, Eastern Visayas offshore, 21 km (13 mi) NNW of Bugko	5.7	48.0	V	Two people injured in Pambujan and Catarman. At least six buildings destroyed and 37 others damaged throughout Northern Samar.	-	2
20	India, Jammu and Kashmir, 8 km (5.0 mi) SW of Bāramūla	5.1	14.1	VII	One person killed, three others injured and dozens of homes damaged in the Bandipore-Baramula-Kupwara area.	1	3
20	India, Jammu and Kashmir, 5 km (3.1 mi) WSW of Bāramūla	4.5	13.7	VII	One person killed, three others injured and dozens of homes damaged in the Bandipore-Baramula-Kupwara area.	1	3
23	Australia, New South Wales, 7 km (4.3 mi) ENE of Denman	4.8	10.0	V	Several people injured, at least 11 buildings damaged and power outages occurred in the Maitland-Muswellbrook area.	-	Several
25	Mexico, Oaxaca, 5 km (3.1 mi) N of San Miguel del Valle	4.5	64.2	V	One person injured and some buildings damaged in the Oaxaca area.	-	1
25	Tonga, Haʻapai offshore, 75 km (47 mi) W of Pangai	6.9	96.0	VI	Communications disrupted in Haʻapai and Vavaʻu due to damage to the Tonga Cable System.	-	-
25	Tonga, Haʻapai offshore, 65 km (40 mi) W of Pangai	6.0	99.3	IV	Aftershock of the 6.9 earthquake one minute prior.	-	-
26	Indonesia, Special Region of Yogyakarta offshore, 89 km (55 mi) S of Bambanglipuro	5.4	54.8	IV	Two people injured in Pacitan and another in Kulon Progo. One home destroyed and 43 others damaged in Gunung Kidul Regency, nine homes and a school damaged in Bantul Regency, three homes damaged in Kulon Progo, a roof collapsed at a market in Sleman Regency, and one home destroyed in Karanganyar.	-	3
28	El Salvador, La Libertad offshore, 56 km (35 mi) SSW of La Libertad	6.1	26.4	V	Fifty people stung by bees after a beehive fell due to the shaking in Juayúa.	-	50
30	Russia, Kamchatka Krai offshore, 117 km (73 mi) E of Petropavlovsk-Kamchatsky	6.0	26.0	V	Aftershock of the 7.0 earthquake on 17 August.	-	-
31	Peru, Ayacucho, 10 km (6.2 mi) E of Pomabamba	4.2	10.0	V	At least six homes destroyed and 261 buildings damaged in María Parado de Bellido District.	-	-

=== September ===
September
- Strongest: 6.5 M_{w} Canada
- Deadliest: 5.0 M_{w} Indonesia; 2 deaths
- Total fatalities: 3

Number by magnitude
- 9.0+: 0
- 8.0–8.9: 0
- 7.0–7.9: 0
- 6.0–6.9: 8
- 5.0–5.9: 117
- 4.0–4.9: 916

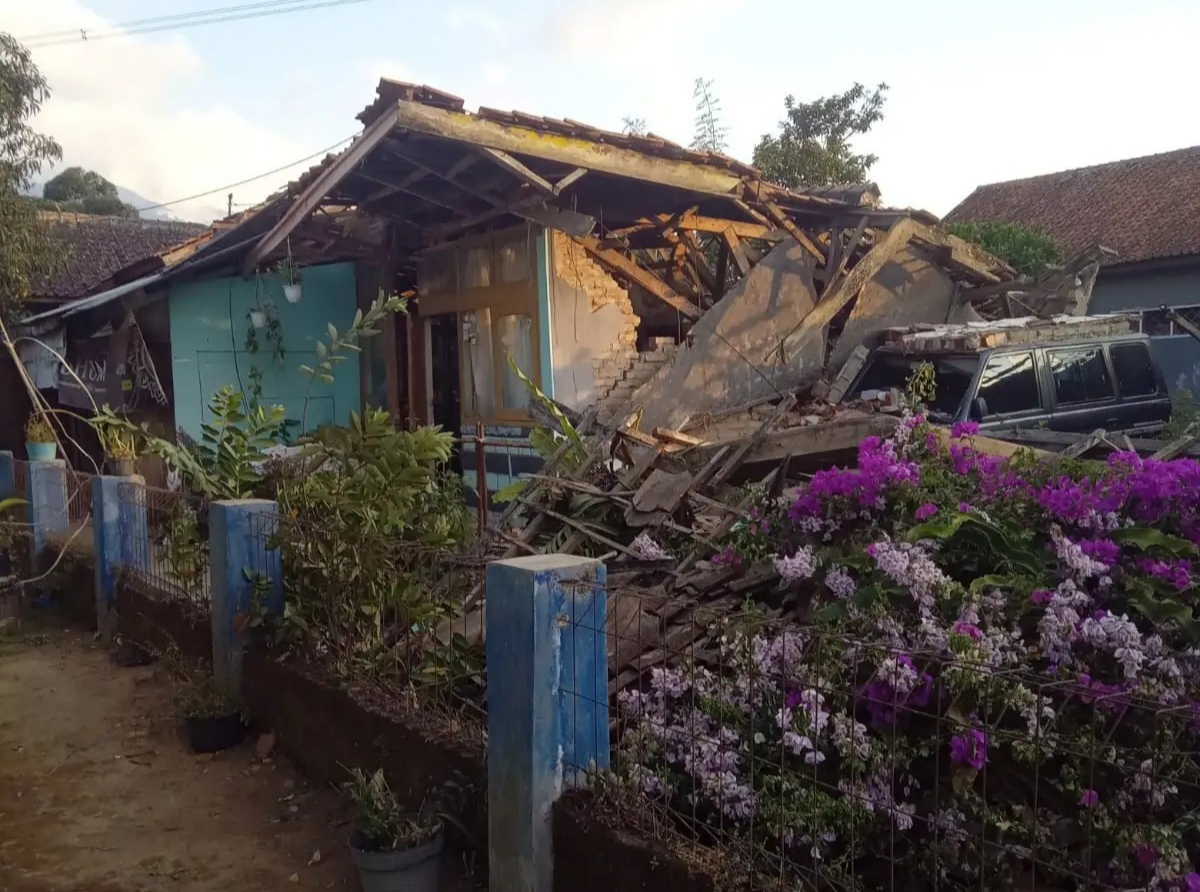
Destroyed homes in Bandung Regency, Indonesia.

Date	Country and location	M_{w}	Depth (km)	MMI	Notes	Casualties	
Date	Country and location	M_{w}	Depth (km)	MMI	Notes	Dead	Injured
1	Papua New Guinea, Bougainville, 56 km (35 mi) S of Panguna	6.4	39.0	VI	-	-	-
4	Spain, Valencia, 1 km (0.62 mi) SSE of Alfafara	2.9	5.0	III	One home destroyed in the Ontinyent area.	-	-
5	Papua New Guinea, East Sepik offshore, 59 km (37 mi) NNE of Angoram	6.2	7.0	VI	-	-	-
6	Indonesia, West Java offshore, 126 km (78 mi) SSW of Banjar	5.0	10.3	II	One home destroyed in Sukabumi Regency.	-	-
6	Australia, New South Wales, 7 km (4.3 mi) NNE of Denman	4.4	8.8	VI	One person injured, 100 buildings damaged and power outages occurred in the Muswellbrook area.	-	1
7	Indonesia, Bali, 10 km (6.2 mi) NE of Ubud	4.9	10.0	VI	One person killed and three others injured by a landslide in Kintamani, Bangli. At least ten buildings damaged in the Badung-Denpasar-Gianyar area.	1	3
11	Papua New Guinea, Manus offshore, 168 km (104 mi) SW of Lorengau	6.3	8.0	IV	-	-	-
15	Indonesia, West Java, 44 km (27 mi) SSE of Pelabuhanratu	5.0	51.2	V	Two buildings collapsed in Garut and three others damaged in Bandung and West Bandung Regency.	-	-
15	Canada, British Columbia offshore, 271 km (168 mi) WNW of Port McNeill	6.5	3.8	V	-	-	-
16	Northern Mariana Islands offshore, 266 km (165 mi) NE of Saipan	6.3	31.0	IV	-	-	-
17	Turkey, Malatya, 9 km (5.6 mi) NE of Sincik	4.1	10.0	IV	One person injured in Malatya.	-	1
18	Indonesia, West Java, 15 km (9.3 mi) ESE of Banjar	5.0	10.0	IV	Further information: 2024 West Java earthquake	2	159
19	Indonesia, North Maluku offshore, 91 km (57 mi) NE of Tobelo	5.2	26.1	V	At least 81 people injured, 6 homes collapsed and 50 buildings damaged in the Morotai area.	-	81
19	Indonesia, Bali, 15 km (9.3 mi) NW of Banjar Wangsian	4.6	10.0	V	One person injured and 18,000 livestock killed after a fire caused by the shaking at a chicken coop in Bangli. At least five structures collapsed and 62 others damaged in the Badung-Denpasar-Gianyar area.	-	1
21	Indonesia, West Kalimantan, 53 km (33 mi) WNW of Sanggau	2.2	11.0	III	One house collapsed and several others damaged in two villages in Sanggau Regency.	-	-
21	Argentina, San Juan, 95 km (59 mi) NNW of Villa General Roca	6.0	141.0	IV	-	-	-
21	Iran, North Khorasan, 22 km (14 mi) N of Bojnurd	4.6	10.0	IV	Eight people injured and several homes damaged in the Asadli-Mehnan-Qarah Bashlu area.	-	8
22	Iran, North Khorasan, 34 km (21 mi) N of Bojnurd	4.8	10.0	V	Forty-eight people injured, some homes collapsed and 36 homes damaged in the Bojnurd area.	-	48
23	Peru, Ayacucho, 16 km (9.9 mi) SSW of Ayna	4.2	34.3	IV	At least five homes collapsed and 133 buildings damaged in the Tambo-Uchuraccay area.	-	-
23	Indonesia, Gorontalo offshore, 67 km (42 mi) SSW of Gorontalo	6.0	143.0	IV	At least two mosques and two schools damaged in the Banggai-Boalemo-Gorontalo area.	-	-
26	Mauritius–Réunion region	6.3	10.0	-	-	-	-

=== October ===
October
- Strongest: 6.6 M_{w} Tonga
- Total fatalities: 0

Number by magnitude
- 9.0+: 0
- 8.0–8.9: 0
- 7.0–7.9: 0
- 6.0–6.9: 7
- 5.0–5.9: 114
- 4.0–4.9: 987

Date	Country and location	M_{w}	Depth (km)	MMI	Notes	Casualties	
Date	Country and location	M_{w}	Depth (km)	MMI	Notes	Dead	Injured
1	Indonesia, Southeast Sulawesi offshore, 260 km (160 mi) east-southeast of Baubau	6.1	576.0	II	-	-	-
1	Tonga, Vavaʻu, 125 km (78 mi) southeast of Neiafu	6.6	10.0	IV	-	-	-
2	Indonesia, West Java, 12 km (7.5 mi) S of Palabuhanratu	4.3	62.2	III	One home collapsed in Sukabumi.	-	-
6	Ethiopia, Oromia, 28 km (17 mi) N of Awash	5.2	10.0	IV	Some homes collapsed, two others, a mosque and a school damaged and ground cracks appeared in the Awash Fentale area.	-	-
12	Costa Rica, Guanacaste offshore, 40 km (25 mi) WNW of Tamarindo	6.2	16.0	V	-	-	-
16	Turkey, Malatya, 19 km (12 mi) W of Doğanyol	6.0	10.0	VIII	Fifty-five people injured, one building collapsed and some mud houses damaged in Malatya; 116 people injured, 22 buildings destroyed and 517 others damaged in Elazığ; 37 people injured, one balcony collapsed and some homes damaged in Şanliurfa; 19 people injured in Diyarbakır, 18 in Adıyaman, six in Erzincan and three more in Kahramanmaraş.	-	254
17	Turkey, Sivas, 23 km (14 mi) S of Hafik	4.5	9.3	VI	Five students hospitalized due to panic attacks and 12 houses in two villages damaged in the epicentral area.	-	5
22	Indonesia, West Java offshore, 53 km (33 mi) S of Kawalu	4.7	94.0	II	One home destroyed in Garut.	-	-
23	Russia, Sakhalin offshore, 146 km (91 mi) SSW of Severo-Kurilsk	6.2	40.0	IV	-	-	-
30	Papua New Guinea, West New Britain offshore, 126 km (78 mi) N of Kimbe	6.0	509.0	III	-	-	-
30	United States, Oregon offshore, 267 km (166 mi) W of Bandon	6.0	10.0	VI	-	-	-

=== November ===
November
- Strongest: 6.8 M_{w} Cuba
- Total fatalities: 0

Number by magnitude
- 9.0+: 0
- 8.0–8.9: 0
- 7.0–7.9: 0
- 6.0–6.9: 5
- 5.0–5.9: 107
- 4.0–4.9: 940

Date	Country and location	M_{w}	Depth (km)	MMI	Notes	Casualties	
Date	Country and location	M_{w}	Depth (km)	MMI	Notes	Dead	Injured
2	Iran, Semnan, 9 km (5.6 mi) SE of Īstgāh-e Rāh Āhan-e Garmsār	4.6	10.0	V	Twenty-four people injured, severe damage and power outages occurred in the Garmsar area.	-	24
4	Peru, Huancavelica, 18 km (11 mi) NNW of Santa Ana	5.7	106.0	IV	One person injured in San Juan de Yanac District.	-	1
8	Chile, Aysén offshore, 239 km (149 mi) WNW of Cochrane	6.3	10.0	VIII	-	-	-
10	Cuba, Granma offshore, 43 km (27 mi) S of Bartolomé Masó	6.8	14.0	VII	Ten people injured, 156 homes destroyed, 8,444 others, 474 public buildings, a dock and the Faro Vargas lighthouse damaged and power outages in the Granma-Santiago de Cuba area.	-	10
14	Iran, Razavi Khorasan, 36 km (22 mi) NNW of Torbat-e Heydarieh	4.2	10.0	IV	Eleven people injured in the Kashmar area.	-	11
15	Papua New Guinea, East New Britain, 123 km (76 mi) ESE of Kokopo	6.6	56.0	VI	-	-	-
15	Turkey, Rize, 2 km (1.2 mi) WNW of Nurluca	4.5	10.0	VIII	One warehouse destroyed, three homes and a mosque damaged in Hemşin District.	-	-
17	Japan, Kagoshima offshore, 155 km (96 mi) SSE of Koshima	6.1	8.0	IV	-	-	-
19	Cuba, Granma offshore, 20 km (12 mi) SW of Pilón	4.2	10.0	-	Aftershock of the 6.8 event on November 10. Several houses destroyed and many others damaged in the Pilón area.	-	-
21	Myanmar, Ayeyarwady, 8 km (5.0 mi) S of Kyaiklat	4.2	15.5	V	One pagoda collapsed and several homes and religious buildings damaged in the Kyaiklat area.	-	-
21	Indonesia, West Java, 26 km (16 mi) E of Sukabumi	2.9	12.0	-	One school collapsed and 21 structures damaged in Cianjur Regency.	-	-
26	Japan, Ishikawa offshore, 38 km (24 mi) WNW of Hakui	6.1	8.0	VI	One person injured in Tsubata.	-	1

=== December ===
December
- Strongest: 7.3 M_{w} Vanuatu
- Deadliest: 7.3 M_{w} Vanuatu; 14 deaths
- Total fatalities: 14

Number by magnitude
- 9.0+: 0
- 8.0–8.9: 0
- 7.0–7.9: 2
- 6.0–6.9: 7
- 5.0–5.9: 143
- 4.0–4.9: 1097

Date	Country and location	M_{w}	Depth (km)	MMI	Notes	Casualties	
Date	Country and location	M_{w}	Depth (km)	MMI	Notes	Dead	Injured
4	India, Telangana, 53 km (33 mi) ENE of Mulugu	5.0	10.0	V	One home and a portico collapsed and several others damaged in the Bhadradri Kothagudem-Eturnagaram-Hanamkonda area.	-	-
5	Iran, Khuzestan, 28 km (17 mi) SE of Masjed Soleyman	5.4	17.0	VI	Forty-eight people injured 100 homes destroyed and 7,000 others damaged, landslides blocked roads and power outages in the Golgir area.	-	48
5	United States, California offshore, 63 km (39 mi) W of Petrolia	7.0	10.0	VIII	Some homes damaged and others shifted from their foundations in the Ferndale-Fortuna area. One road damaged and a gas leak occurred at a school in Rio Dell. Many stores incurred damage from fallen merchandise and goods, and 10,000 customers affected by power outages in Humboldt County.	-	-
6	Indonesia, Central Sulawesi offshore, 234 km (145 mi) WNW of Gorontalo	5.5	12.6	V	Three homes destroyed and 20 structures damaged in Buol Regency.	-	-
7	Indonesia, West Java, 14 km (8.7 mi) E of Banjar	4.6	6.9	-	At least 11 homes and two schools destroyed and 117 structures damaged in Garut.	-	-
8	Russia, Kuril Islands offshore	6.0	207.0	III	-	-	-
8	United States, Alaska offshore, 108 km (67 mi) SSW of Adak	6.3	18.0	III	An example of a doublet earthquake.	-	-
9	United States, Alaska offshore, 104 km (65 mi) SSW of Adak	6.3	19.0	IV	An example of a doublet earthquake.	-	-
9	United States, Alaska offshore, 126 km (78 mi) SSW of Adak	6.1	10.0	III	Aftershock of the 6.3 doublet earthquakes on December 8–9.	-	-
9	El Salvador, La Unión, 9 km (5.6 mi) S of Conchagua	5.6	15.4	VII	Ten homes destroyed, 180 others, a church and a warehouse damaged and landslides in the Conchagua-La Unión area.	-	-
9	Italy, Lazio offshore, 3 km (1.9 mi) SE of Formia	4.0	10.0	-	Several homes and buildings damaged or destroyed in the Roccamonfina area.	-	-
13	Iran, Mazandaran, 29 km (18 mi) S of Sari	4.7	10.0	V	At least 78 homes damaged in Mazandaran province.	-	-
13	Chile, Maule, 56 km (35 mi) ESE of Molina	6.4	109.0	VI	Minor damage and power outages occurred in the Los Ríos-Santiago-Valparaíso area.	-	-
17	Vanuatu, Shefa offshore, 24 km (15 mi) WNW of Port Vila	7.3	54.4	IX	Further information: 2024 Port Vila earthquake	14	265
20	Nepal, Sudurpashchim, 62 km (39 mi) WNW of Jumla	5.0	10.0	V	At least 108 homes destroyed and 501 structures damaged in Bajura District.	-	-
21	Vanuatu, Shefa offshore, 30 km (19 mi) W of Port Vila	6.1	46.0	V	Aftershock of the 7.3 earthquake four days prior.	-	-
23	Cuba, Santiago de Cuba offshore, 41 km (25 mi) SSW of Guisa	5.9	7.0	VI	One balcony collapsed in Manzanillo, 94 structures damaged in the epicentral area and rockfalls blocked roads in Guamá.	-	-
27	Russia, Kuril Islands offshore, 341 km (212 mi) NE of Kuril'sk	6.8	146.0	V	-	-	-
27	El Salvador, Sonsonate offshore, 26 km (16 mi) SW of Acajutla	4.7	76.9	IV	Four workers injured by falling debris at a road construction site in the Santa Tecla area.	-	4
29	Ethiopia, Oromia, 36 km (22 mi) NNW of Awash	5.1	10.0	IV	Part of an earthquake swarm. More than 50 homes and shops destroyed, 100 others and a road damaged, and ground cracks in the Awash Fentale-Dulecha area.	-	-
30	Philippines, Ilocos, 11 km (6.8 mi) SE of Bangui	5.5	34.0	V	Several buildings damaged, some of them severely, in the Bangui-Pasuquin-Sarrat area.	-	-

== See also ==
- Lists of 21st-century earthquakes
- List of earthquakes 2021–present
- Lists of earthquakes by year
