= 2024 West Java earthquake =

Earthquake in Bandung, Indonesia

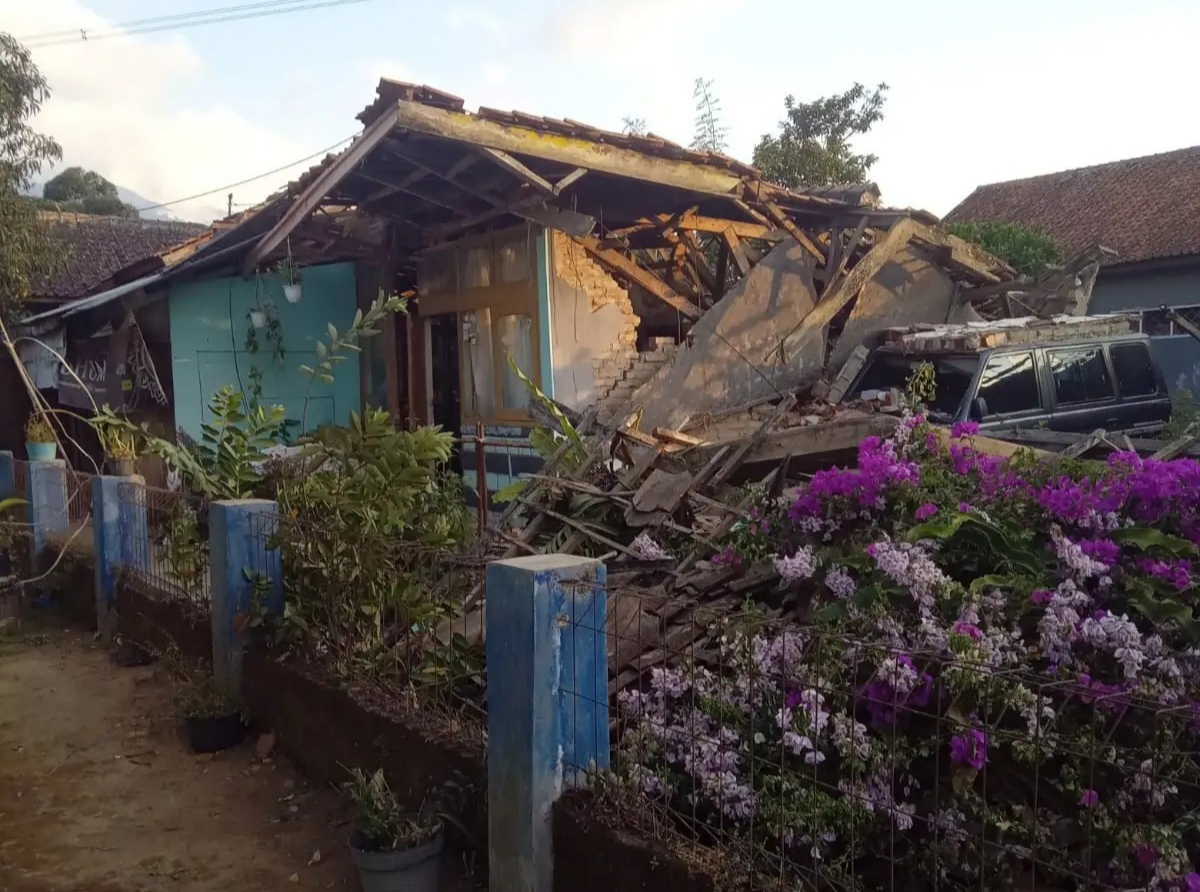
- Homes destroyed in Bandung Regency

- Location within Java Location within Indonesia
- UTC time: 2024-09-18 02:41:06
- USGS-ANSS: ComCat
- Local date: 18 September 2024
- Local time: 09:41:06 WIB
- Magnitude: 5.0 M_{w}
- Depth: 10 km (6 mi) (USGS)
- Epicenter: 7.237°S 107.570°E
- Areas affected: Java, Indonesia
- Total damage: Rp. 385 billion ($25 million)
- Max. intensity: MMI IV (Light)
- Aftershocks: 33, largest is M_{w} 3.5
- Casualties: 2 dead, 159 injured

On 18 September 2024, at 09:41:06 WIB (02:41:06 UTC), a M_{w} 5.0 earthquake struck Bandung Regency in West Java, Indonesia, 14 km (8.7 mi) east-southeast of Banjar. The earthquake killed two people and injured at least 159 others.

== Tectonic setting ==
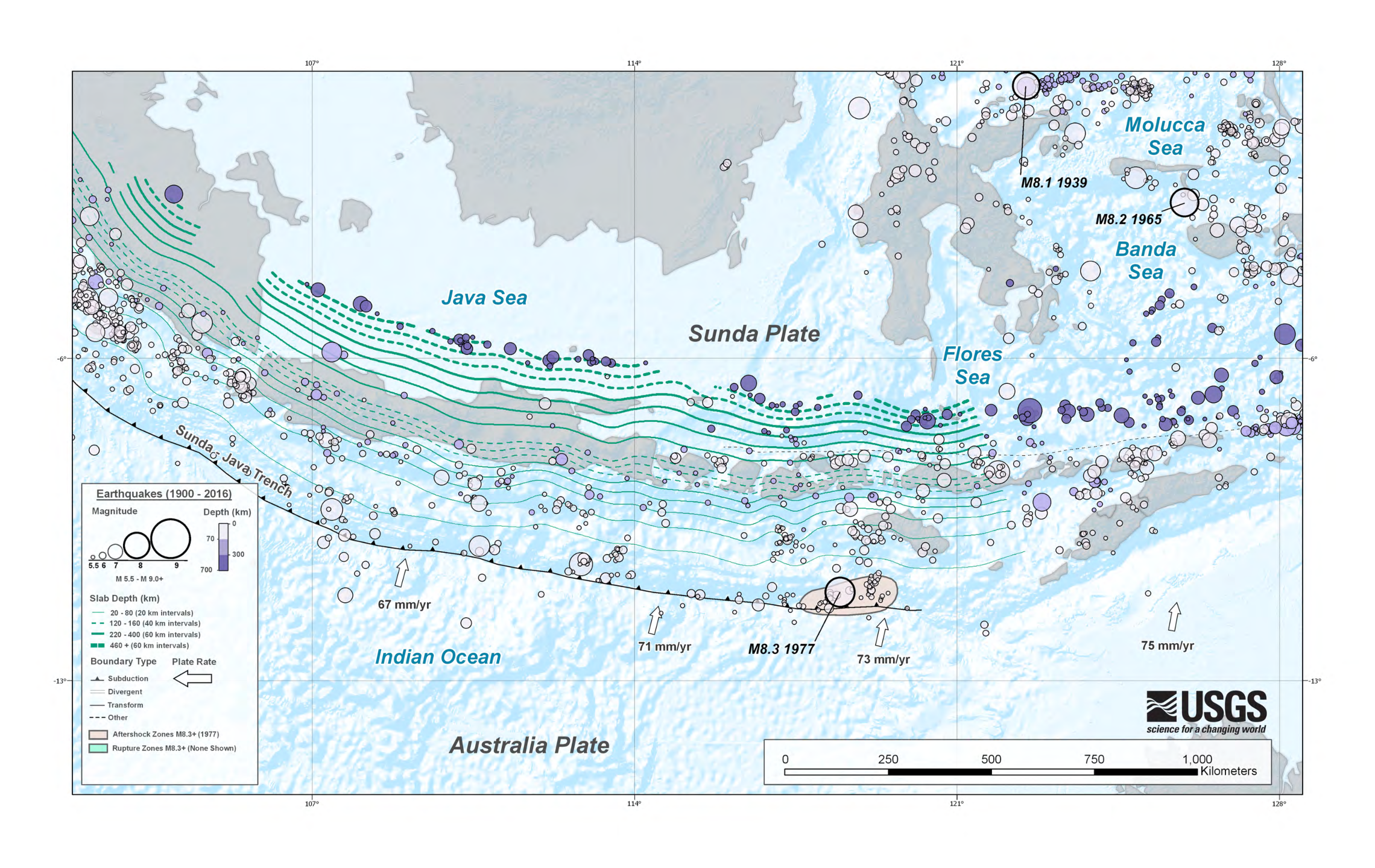
Tectonic setting of Java

Java lies near an active convergent boundary that separates the Sunda Plate to the north and the Australian Plate to the south. At the boundary, marked by the Sunda Trench, the northward-moving Australian Plate subducts beneath the Sunda Plate. The subduction zone is capable of generating earthquakes of up to magnitude 8.7, while the Australian Plate may also host deeper earthquakes within the downgoing lithosphere (intraslab earthquakes) beneath the coast of Java. The subduction zone produced two destructive earthquakes and tsunamis in 2006 and 1994. An intraslab earthquake in 2009 also caused severe destruction.

Compared to the highly oblique convergence across the plate boundary in Sumatra, near Java, it is close to orthogonal. However, there is still a small component of left-lateral strike-slip that is accommodated within the over-riding Sunda Plate. The Cimandiri Fault is one of the structures thought to be responsible. Field investigations, combined with morphometric analysis show that the Cimandiri Fault zone is a relatively broad zone of faulting and folding, with six segments identified. Older parts of the fault zone show evidence of dominant left-lateral strike-slip, while younger parts show mainly oblique slip, with a mixture of reverse faulting and left-lateral strike-slip.

== Geology ==
According to the National Agency for Disaster Countermeasure (BNPB), the earthquake occurred in proximity to the Garsela and Lembang faults. None of these faults triggered the earthquake, instead, it ruptured along a previously unknown fault. In 2022, an earthquake in Cianjur occurred on another unmapped fault that resulted in over 600 fatalities.

== Impact ==
Two people died and 159 others were injured. Both fatalities were children; one succumbed to injuries sustained after being struck by falling debris while another died from a seizure. The earthquake also displaced 710 people who were moved to shelters. At least 784 homes collapsed and over 5,379 others and 226 buildings were damaged in Bandung Regency. In Garut, 20 people were injured, six homes collapsed, and 2,036 structures were damaged. A house was destroyed and two others were damaged in West Bandung Regency; one school was damaged in Cimahi; another home collapsed in Purwakarta; and one home was damaged in Bogor.

== See also ==
- List of earthquakes in 2024
- 2022 West Java earthquake
- List of earthquakes in Indonesia
