= 2024 Port Vila earthquake =

Earthquake in Vanuatu

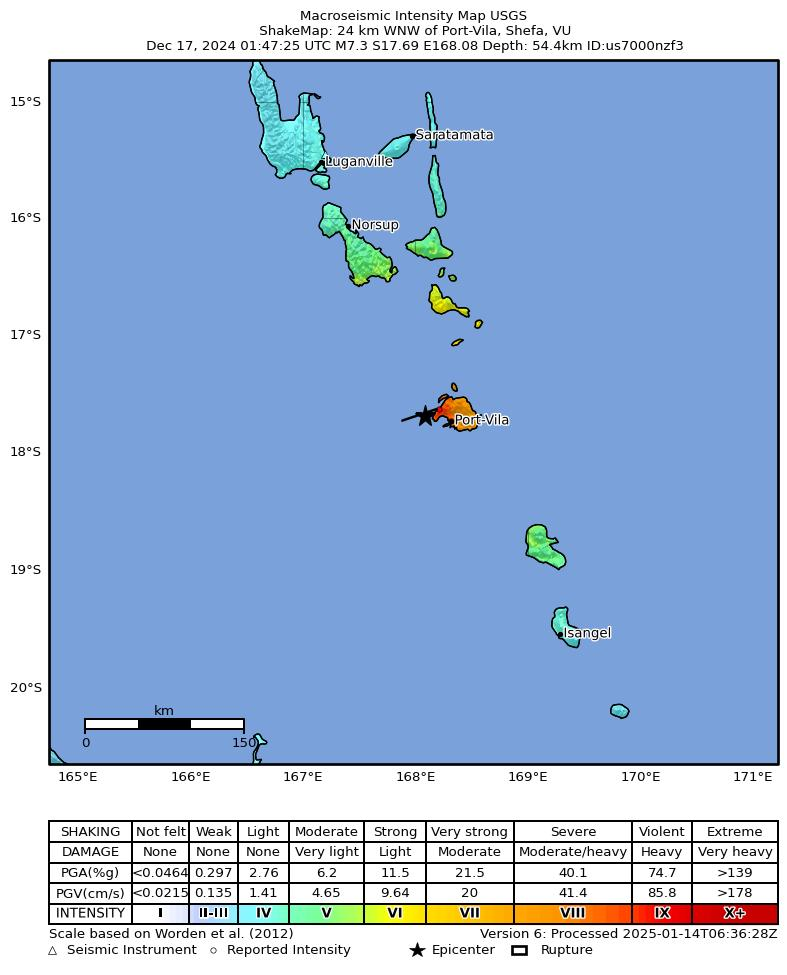
- USGS ground motion map

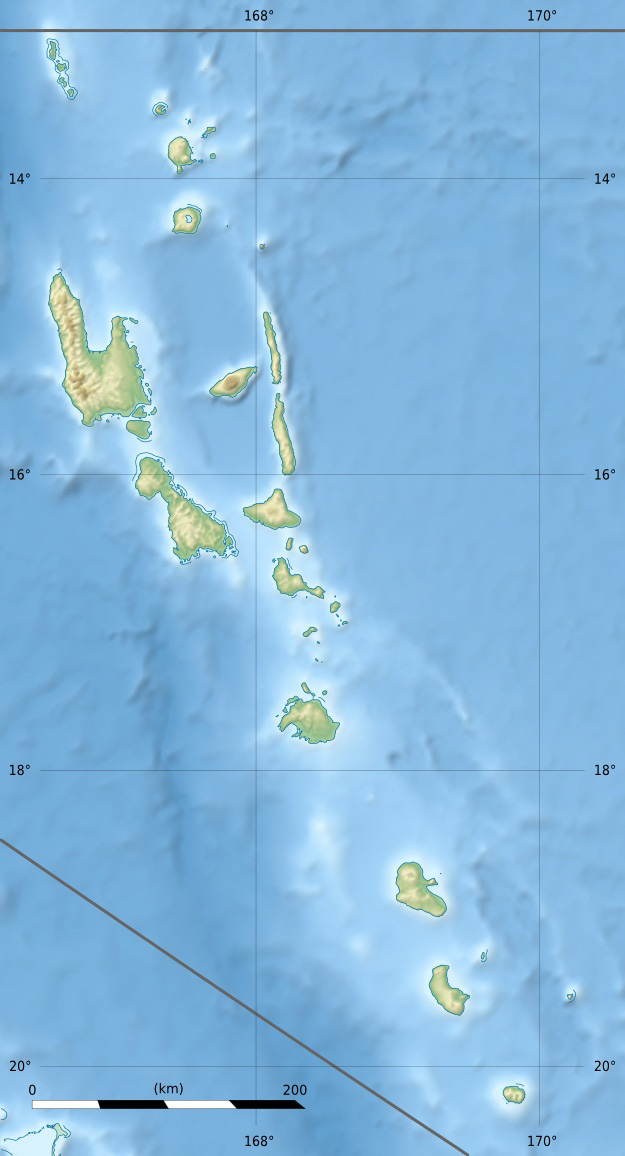
- Location within Vanuatu
- UTC time: 2024-12-17 01:47:26
- ISC event: 642646721
- USGS-ANSS: ComCat
- Local date: 17 December 2024
- Local time: 12:47:26 VUT (UTC+11)
- Duration: 30 seconds
- Magnitude: M_{w} 7.3
- Depth: 54.4 km (34 mi)
- Epicenter: 17.691°S 168.084°E
- Type: Oblique-slip
- Areas affected: Efate, Vanuatu
- Total damage: US$231.7 million
- Max. intensity: MMI IX (Violent)
- Tsunami: 25 cm (10 in)
- Aftershocks: 300+ Strongest: M_{w}6.1
- Casualties: 14 fatalities, 265 injuries, "many" missing

At 12:47:26 VUT (01:47:26 UTC) on 17 December 2024, a M_{w} 7.3 earthquake struck near Port Vila, the capital of Vanuatu. At least 14 people died while 265 others were injured. Extensive damage occurred in Port Vila and surrounding areas. The earthquake also generated a 25 cm (10 in) tsunami.

== Tectonic setting ==
The primary feature of the Vanuatuan archipelago, located on its west-southwest, is the New Hebrides Trench, the convergent boundary between the Australian and New Hebrides plates. Along the Wadati–Benioff zone, earthquake activity has been observed as shallow, intermediate, and deep-focus events at depths of up to 700 km (430 mi). Volcanic activity is also present along this north-northwest trending and northeast-dipping subduction zone. This subduction zone is one of the most active plate boundaries globally, moving at a rate of approximately 170 mm (7 in) per year.

While much of the island arc experiences intermediate-depth earthquakes along a Wadati–Benioff zone that dips steeply at 70°, the area adjacent to the D'entrecasteaux Ridge does not. There is a corresponding gap in seismicity that occurs below 50 km (31 mi) where it enters the subduction zone from the west. According to the NUVEL-1 global relative plate motion model, convergence is occurring at roughly 8 cm (3.1 in) per year. The uncertainty, which also affects the Tonga Arc, is due to the influence of spreading at the North Fiji Basin. Of the 58 M_{w} 7.0 or greater events that occurred between 1909 and 2001, few were studied.

== Earthquake ==
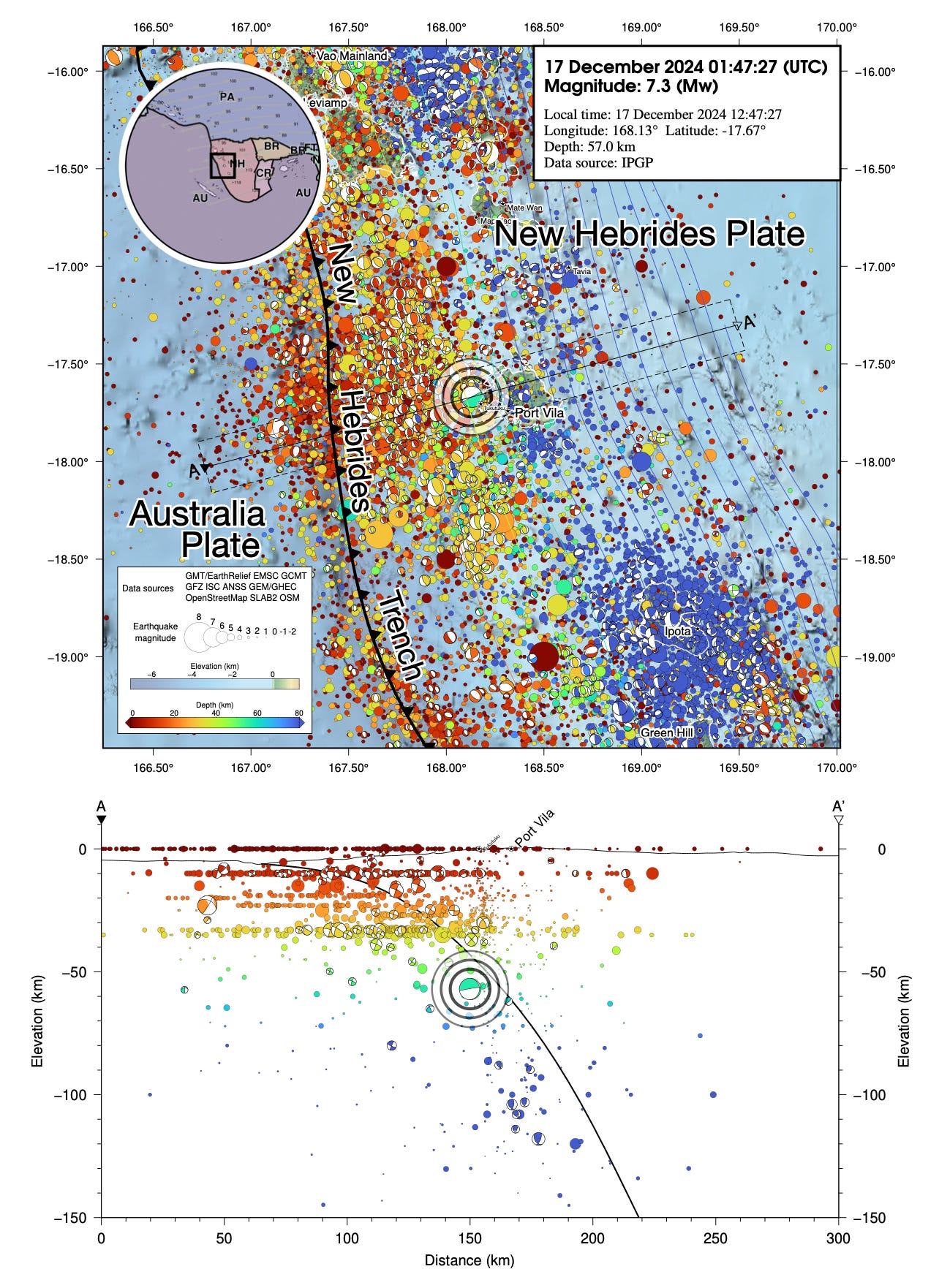
December 17 2024 M7.3 earthquake, together with recorded seismicity (colored by depth). Cross-section shows the position of the earthquake relative to the subduction interface from Slab2.0.

The earthquake struck some 8 kilometres (5.0 mi) off the western coast of Efate. The United States Geological Survey (USGS) placed the earthquake at M_{w} 7.3 with a depth of 54.4 kilometres (33.8 mi). The focal mechanism indicated oblique-normal faulting. Together with the hypocentral depth, this implied faulting within the subducting Australian plate. The USGS proposed two finite fault models: one depicting rupture on a northwest-trending fault with a shallow west-southwest dip, and the other on an east-northeast fault with a near-vertical dip. Both rupture models indicated a maximum slip of 3 m (9.8 ft). Shaking was estimated to have lasted for around 30 seconds. Over 300 aftershocks were recorded, with the strongest measuring M_{w} 6.1 on 22 December. The earthquake with its current depth was significantly smaller than M_{w} 8 earthquakes typically responsible for generating damaging tsunamis.

== Impact ==
At least 14 people were confirmed dead, while 265 others were injured and many others were still missing as of 23 December. Of the casualties, two of the fatalities were Chinese, one death and three of the injuries were Thai, and another fatality was French. Two children were also among the dead. Thousands of homes collapsed or suffered damage, including 245 which were completely or partially destroyed, although former Prime Minister Ishmael Kalsakau claimed that almost every single house on the island of Efate suffered damage. In Port Vila, at least 10 buildings collapsed, including some in a pancaking manner. A building housing the United States, United Kingdom, French and New Zealand embassies and high commissions collapsed on its ground floor. The United States, France, New Zealand and Australia said that their diplomatic personnel in Vanuatu were in safe condition. Many landslides occurred, including some that blocked roads and buried a wharf in the city. Two bridges also collapsed. The earthquake struck at a time when the center of Port Vila was busy with lunchtime shoppers.

A landslide struck the international shipping terminal of Port Vila, while the runway and control tower of Bauerfield International Airport was damaged, leading to the cancellation of multiple flights and its closure to non-humanitarian flights for 72 hours. Another landslide buried a bus, resulting in multiple deaths. Two reservoirs and the Port Vila Central Hospital were also damaged, forcing the transfer of patients to a military camp. Landslides were also reported in outlying villages and islands, while three bridges were damaged to a point that they were at high risk of collapsing in case of heavy rain. Two power lines were also damaged. The earthquake also triggered landslides that blocked airfields in surrounding islands and damaged water supplies. The Port Vila Market was severely damaged and was later demolished.

A 25 cm (9.8 in) tsunami was observed. The submarine cable providing internet service to Vanuatu was damaged, causing outages. Websites of Vanuatuan government agencies went offline, while communication lines for police and related authorities were rendered unserviceable. The Vanuatu Broadcasting and Television Corporation went off air due to damage to Broadcasting House. Despite connectivity issues, people were able to go online through Starlink. The Vanuatu Red Cross Society building was also damaged. Power and water outages occurred in the city, leading to an increase in diarrhoea cases. The main utilities provider, UNELCO, said it could take two weeks to fully restore water supplies. Extensive crop damage was recorded in Mataso due to landslides that buried gardens, sparking concerns over food shortages. Some residents in Port Vila were too scared to return to their homes due to aftershocks, with some families erecting tents in open places to sleep outside due to fear of further earthquakes. In Malorua, closest to the epicenter, six buildings were damaged and 20 hectares of land were affected by landslides. A landslide destroyed multiple homes and caused water outages in Mele Maat.

The USGS estimated that the earthquake could cause economic losses measuring between 1–10% of Vanuatu's GDP. The United Nations Office for the Coordination of Humanitarian Affairs estimated that 116,000 people had been directly affected by the earthquake, equivalent to a third of Vanuatu's population. Among them were 14,000 children. At least 2,435 people were displaced, while 20,000 were without water. The Recovery Operation Centre estimated that the amount needed to recover from the earthquake reached 29 billion vatu (US$231.7 million). It also estimated that around 6,000 workers from 200 businesses operating in downtown Port Vila were affected. The education ministry said 45 schools were damaged, including Malapoa College, with rebuilding costs estimated at more than US$8 million. Save the Children said nearly 13,000 children required temporary learning solutions. A survey by the Vanuatu Chamber of Commerce found that the extended closure of downtown Port-Vila had left 900 people unemployed.

== Response ==
A tsunami warning was issued by the Pacific Tsunami Warning Centre covering Vanuatu, Fiji, the Kermadec Islands, Kiribati, New Caledonia, Papua New Guinea, the Solomon Islands, Tuvalu and Wallis and Futuna, with waves expected to reach 1 m (3 ft 3 in). This was lifted on 14:14 VUT. The Vanuatu National Disaster Management Office told residents of coastal areas to flee to higher ground. Authorities in the country were placed on high alert with one local journalist telling FBC News that the Vanuatu Mobile Forces (VMF) and government emergency workers were immediately mobilized to assist those affected, adding that "government officials are dealing with several casualties." A mass casualty triage centre was set up outside the emergency ward of Port Vila Central Hospital. The central business district of Port Vila was closed off, while a boil water notice was declared over the city. Officials are currently assessing the extent of the destruction and prioritizing rescue efforts.

A seven-day state of emergency and a nighttime curfew was declared by Prime Minister Charlot Salwai, who also requested international assistance. Australia, France, New Zealand and the United States deployed humanitarian equipment and personnel to Vanuatu. Australia said it was assisting efforts to reopen Port Vila's airport. Fiji also offered support and deployed personnel. However with the airport in Port Vila inaccessible, Fijian personnel and humanitarian assistance were deployed via Santo International Airport in Espiritu Santo island. From there, teams travelled to affected areas by marine vessels. Around 700 Australian citizens in Vanuatu were repatriated by the Royal Australian Air Force, while 81 New Zealanders and 12 other nationals were evacuated by the New Zealand Defence Force. The French military evacuated 20 New Caledonian children. On 18 December, a Lockheed C-130 Hercules of the Royal New Zealand Air Force carrying an urban search and rescue team to Vanuatu was diverted to Nouméa in New Caledonia due to an engine fire warning. China also sent 35 tons of humanitarian aid. The British High Commission in Vanuatu donated £400,000 (US$496,880) in humanitarian aid to UNICEF Pacific.

On 20 December 2024, over seven tonnes of aid were delivered by New Zealand. This alongside the deployment of an urban search and rescue team, Ministry of Health staff, as well as New Zealand Red Cross personnel, with the latter providing satellite phones and Starlink devices. On 22 December, Port Vila airport resumed commercial operations.

The 2025 Vanuatuan general election originally scheduled on 14 January was moved to 16 January due to the earthquake. On 17 April 2025, NZ Foreign Minister Winston Peters announced that New Zealand would contribute NZ$10 million to Vanuatuan earthquake recovery efforts.

== See also ==
- List of earthquakes in 2024
- List of earthquakes in Vanuatu
- 2002 Port Vila earthquake
