= Port Vila Market =

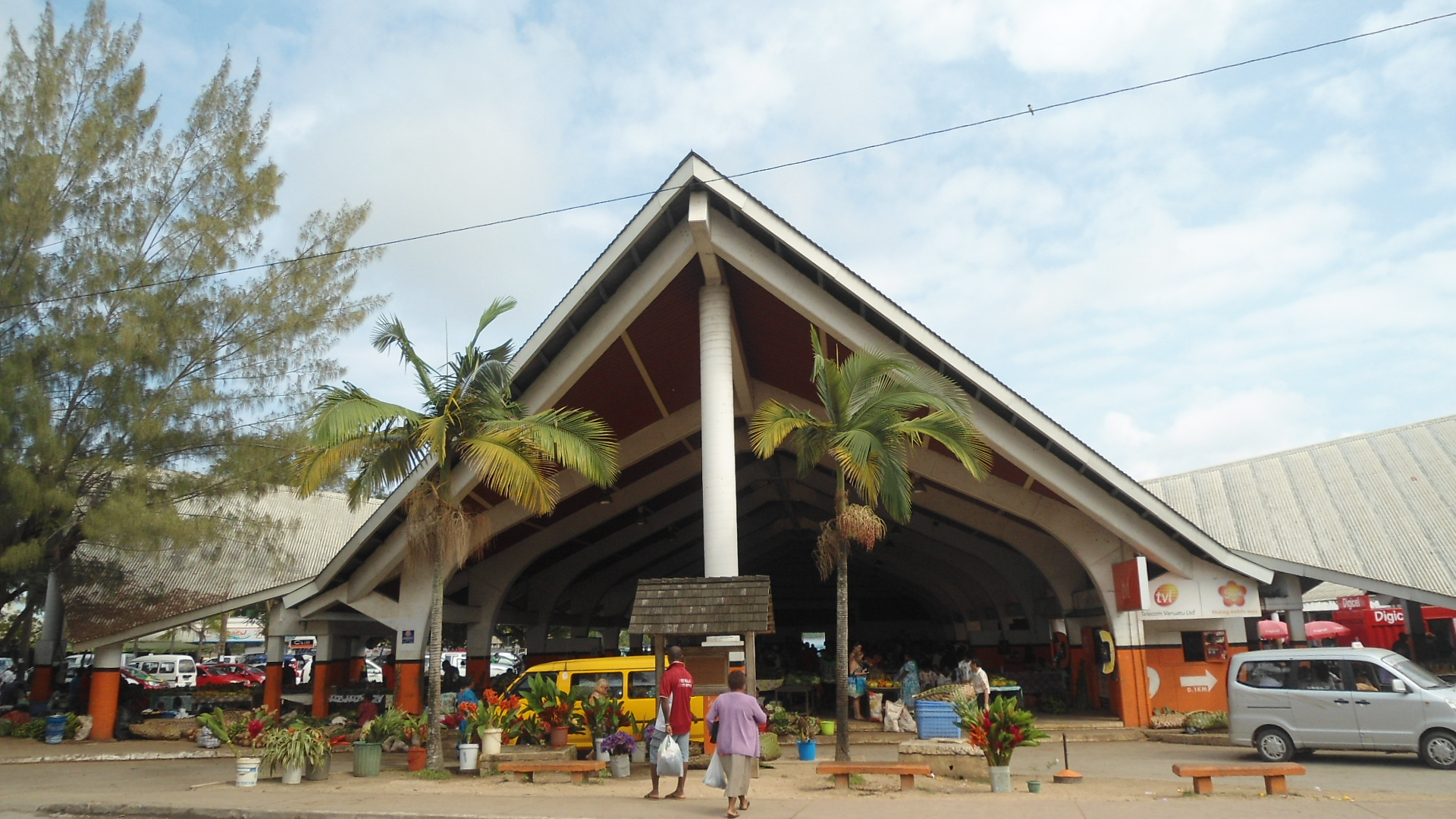
Port Vila market (2015)

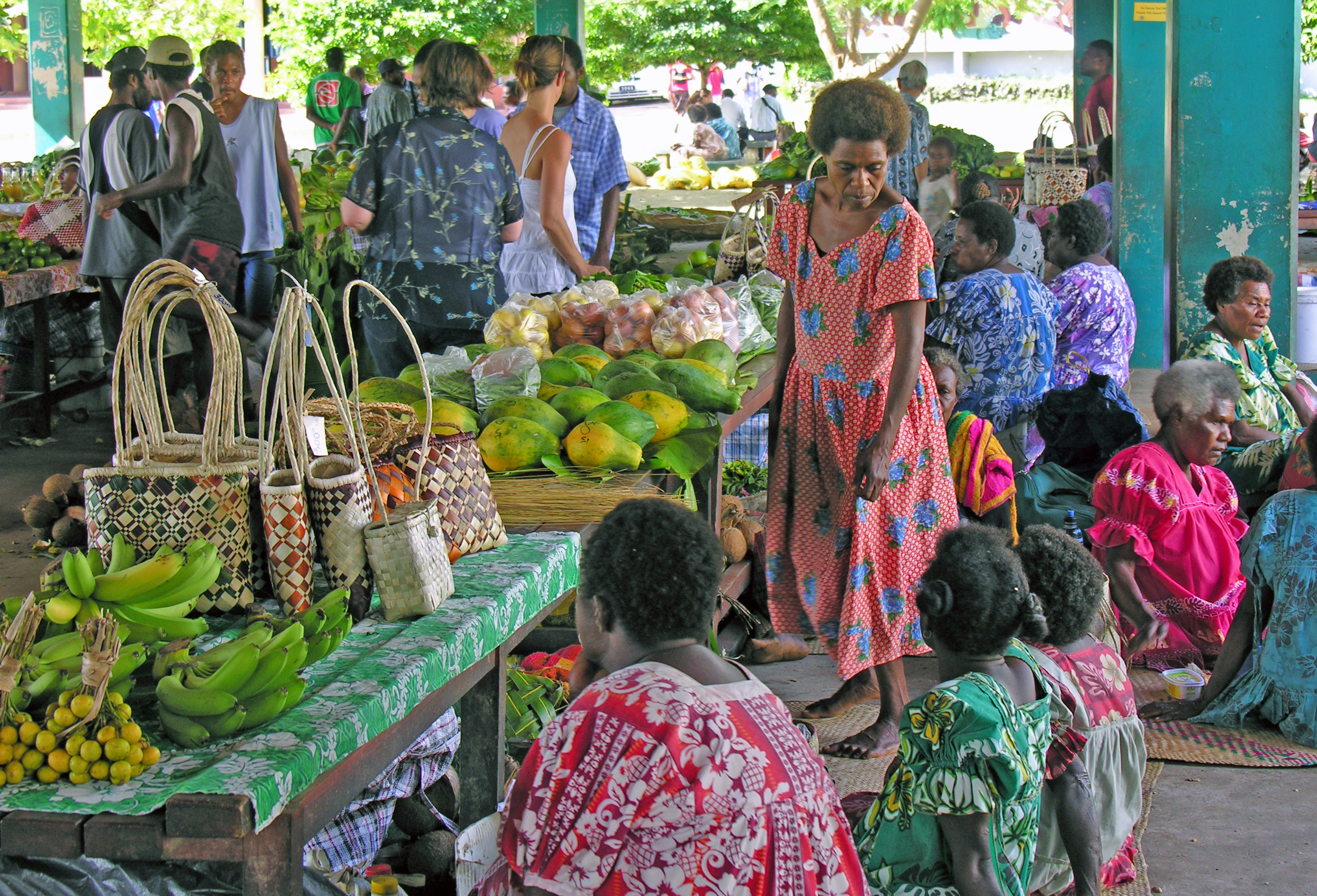
Local retailers in 2006

Port Vila Market is the central market of Vanuatu's capital of Port Vila.

The market is described by Lonely Planet as "colourful and busy", and notes that it typically sells "vegetables, flowers, firewood, jewellery, woodcarvings and souvenirs [which] are in the care of Ni-Van women wearing colourful Mother Hubbard dresses".

Depending upon the time of year, a range of produce is sold; wild raspberries are sold by the locals in September, mangoes in November, and from March to May passion fruit is the specialty. Though the market is run throughout the week from Monday to Friday, Saturday morning, until 2pm when it closes, is the busiest. Shells, necklaces, anklets and bracelets, handcrafted by the locals, are also sold.

The market building was severely damaged by the 2024 Port Vila earthquake, forcing some vendors to relocate to the Seaside Market. The market reopened on 28 July 2025.
