= Fangaleʻounga =

Coordinates: 19.753°S 174.323°W

Fangale'ounga is a settlement in Foa island, Tonga. It had a population of 140 in 2016.
