= List of earthquakes 2001–2010 =

Earthquakes in 2001–2010
- Strongest: 9.1 M_{w}, 2004 Indian Ocean earthquake and tsunami
- Deadliest: 9.1 M_{w}, 2004 Indian Ocean earthquake and tsunami 227,898
- Total fatalities: 792,667

Number by magnitude
- 9.0+: 1
- 8.0–8.9: 12
- 7.0–7.9: 141
- 6.0–6.9: 1,454
- 5.0–5.9: 16,500

The following is a list of significant earthquakes for the period 2001–2010, listing earthquakes of magnitude 7 and above, or which caused fatalities. Deaths due to earthquake-caused tsunamis are included. In terms of fatalities, the 2004 Indian Ocean earthquake was the most destructive event, followed by the 2010 Haiti earthquake, 2005 Pakistan earthquake and 2008 Sichuan earthquake.

For lists of earthquakes by country, which may include smaller and less destructive events than those listed here, see Lists of earthquakes by country.

== 2001 ==
Date	Time (UTC)	Place	Lat.	Long.	Fatalities	Magnitude	Comments	Sources
January 1, 2001	06:57	Mindanao, Philippines	6.898	126.579	0	7.5	M_{wc} (USGS) Centred 21km SE of Lukatan, Philippines, at a depth of 33.0km.	
January 9, 2001	16:49	Vanuatu	-14.928	167.170	0	7.1	M_{wb} (USGS) Centred 16km NE of Port–Olry, Vanuatu, at a depth of 103.0km.	
January 13, 2001	17:33	El Salvador see January 2001 El Salvador earthquake	13.049	-88.660	952 dead 193 missing	7.7	M_{wc} (USGS) Centred 28km SSW of Puerto El Triunfo, El Salvador, at a depth of 60.0km.	
January 26, 2001	03:16	Gujarat, India see 2001 Gujarat earthquake	23.419	70.232	20,023	7.7	M_{wc} (USGS) Centred 17km NW of Bhachāu, India, at a depth of 16.0km.	
February 13, 2001	14:22	El Salvador see February 2001 El Salvador earthquake	13.671	-88.938	315 dead 92 missing	6.6	M_{wc} (USGS) Centred 5km south of Cojutepeque, El Salvador, at a depth of 10.0km.	
February 13, 2001	19:28	Southern Sumatra, Indonesia	-4.680	102.562	0	7.4	M_{wc} (USGS) Centred 102km SSE of Bengkulu, Indonesia, at a depth of 36.0km.	
February 17, 2001	20:25	El Salvador	13.787	-89.106	1	4.1	M_{b} (USGS) Centred 1km ENE of Tonacatepeque, El Salvador, at a depth of 10.0km.	
February 23, 2001	00:09	Western Sichuan, China	29.513	101.129	3	5.6	M_{wc} (USGS) Centred 96km SW of Kangding, China, at a depth of 33.0km.	
February 24, 2001	07:23	Molucca Sea	1.271	126.249	0	7.1	M_{wc} (USGS) Centred 137km WNW of Ternate, Indonesia, at a depth of 35.0km.	
February 28, 2001	18:54	Puget Sound region, Washington, United States see 2001 Nisqually earthquake	47.149	-122.727	1	6.8	M_{d} (USGS) Centred 7km SSE of Longbranch, Washington, United States, at a depth of 51.8km.	
March 24, 2001	06:27	Western Honshu, Japan see 2001 Geiyo earthquake	34.083	132.526	2	6.8	M_{wc} (USGS) Centred 16km SSW of Kure, Japan, at a depth of 50.0km.	
April 12, 2001	10:47	Yunnan, China	24.768	99.061	2	5.6	M_{wc} (USGS) Centred 147km SW of Dali, China, at a depth of 10.0km.	
May 8, 2001	18:02	El Salvador	13.605	-88.795	1	5.7	M_{wc} (USGS) Centred 3km south of San Vicente, El Salvador, at a depth of 10.0km.	
May 23, 2001	21:10	Western Sichuan, China	27.689	101.003	2	5.5	M_{wc} (USGS) Centred 119km NE of Lijiang, China, at a depth of 33.0km.	
June 1, 2001	14:00	Hindu Kush region, Afghanistan	35.169	69.389	4	5.0	M_{wc} (USGS) Centred 14km ENE of Jabal os Saraj, Afghanistan, at a depth of 62.1km.	
June 3, 2001	02:41	Kermadec Islands, New Zealand	-29.666	-178.633	0	7.2	M_{wc} (USGS) Centred 921.4km NE of Ngunguru, Northland, New Zealand, at a depth of 178.1km.	
June 21, 2001	19:55	Germany	49.147	6.870	1	4.2	M_{L} (USGS) Centred 1km ENE of Cocheren, Grand Est, France, at a depth of 1.0km. The fatality took place in France.	
June 23, 2001	20:33	Near the coast of southern Peru see 2001 southern Peru earthquake	-16.265	-73.641	74~145	8.4	M_{w} (USGS) Centred 6km SSW of Atico, Peru, at a depth of 33.0km.	
July 7, 2001	09:38	Near the coast of southern Peru see 2001 southern Peru earthquake	-17.543	-72.077	1	7.6	M_{wc} (USGS) Centred 51km SW of Punta de Bombón, Peru, at a depth of 33.0km.	
July 17, 2001	15:06	Northern Italy	46.735	11.201	4	4.7	M_{wr} (USGS) Centred 3km NNE of Rifiano, Italy, at a depth of 10.0km.	
July 24, 2001	05:00	Tarapaca, Chile	-19.448	-69.255	1	6.4	M_{wb} (USGS) Centred 126km NE of Iquique, Chile, at a depth of 33.0km.	
August 9, 2001	02:06	Central Peru	-14.258	-72.683	4	5.8	M_{wc} (USGS) Centred 7km WSW of Turpay, Peru, at a depth of 33.0km.	
August 21, 2001	06:52	East of the North Island of New Zealand	-36.813	-179.575	0	7.1	M_{wc} (USGS) Centred 295km NE of Gisborne, New Zealand, at a depth of 33.0km.	
October 12, 2001	15:02	Guam region	12.686	144.980	0	7.0	M_{wc} (USGS) Centred 69km SSE of Inarajan Village, Guam, at a depth of 37.0km.	
October 19, 2001	03:28	Banda Sea	-4.102	123.907	0	7.5	M_{wc} (USGS) Centred 155km east of Kendari, Indonesia, at a depth of 33.0km.	
October 27, 2001	05:35	Yunnan, China	26.316	100.648	1	5.6	M_{wc} (USGS) Centred 74km SE of Lijiang, China, at a depth of 10.0km.	
October 31, 2001	09:10	New Britain region, Papua New Guinea	-5.912	150.196	0	7.0	M_{wc} (USGS) Centred 40km south of Kimbe, Papua New Guinea, at a depth of 33.0km.	
November 14, 2001	09:26	Southern Qinghai, China see 2001 Kunlun earthquake	35.946	90.541	0	7.8	M_{wc} (USGS) Centred 394.1km SSE of Bingtuan Sanshiliu Tuan, Xinjiang, China, at a depth of 10.0km.	
December 4, 2001	05:57	Southern Peru	-15.350	-72.516	2	5.8	M_{wc} (USGS) Centred 20km WSW of Orcopampa, Peru, at a depth of 33.0km.	
December 12, 2001	14:02	South of Australia	-42.813	124.688	0	7.1	M_{wc} (USGS) Centred 1022km SSE of West Beach, Western Australia, Australia, at a depth of 10.0km.	

== 2002 ==
Date	Time (UTC)	Place	Lat.	Long.	Fatalities	Magnitude	Comments	Sources
January 2, 2002	17:22	Vanuatu; See 2002 Port Vila earthquake	-17.600	167.856	0	7.2	M_{w} (HRV).	
January 9, 2002	06:45	Tajikistan	38.673	69.902	3	5.3	M_{w} (HRV).	
January 10, 2002	11:14	Near the north coast of New Guinea, Papua New Guinea	-3.212	142.427	1	6.7	M_{w} (HRV).	
January 17, 2002	20:01	Lac Kivu region, Democratic Republic of the Congo	-1.684	29.077	7	4.7	M_{b} (USGS).	
January 21, 2002	14:34	Turkey	38.664	27.881	1	4.6	M_{b} (USGS).	
January 22, 2002	04:53	Crete, Greece	35.790	26.617	1	6.2	M_{w} (HRV, USGS).	
February 3, 2002	07:11	Western Turkey	38.573	31.271	44	6.5	M_{w} (HRV).	
February 17, 2002	13:03	Southern Iran	28.093	51.755	1	5.4	M_{w} (HRV, USGS).	
March 3, 2002	12:08	Hindu Kush region, Afghanistan see 2002 Hindu Kush earthquakes	36.502	70.482	166	7.4	M_{w} (HRV).	
March 5, 2002	21:16	Mindanao, Philippines see 2002 Mindanao earthquake	6.033	124.249	15	7.5	M_{w} (HRV).	
March 25, 2002	14:56	Hindu Kush region, Afghanistan see 2002 Hindu Kush earthquakes	36.062	69.315	1,200	6.1	M_{w} (HRV).	
March 31, 2002	06:52	Taiwan region	24.279	122.179	5	7.1	M_{w} (HRV, USGS).	
April 1, 2002	06:14	Eastern New Guinea region, Papua New Guinea	-6.191	147.421	36	5.3	M_{w} (HRV).	
April 12, 2002	04:00	Hindu Kush region, Afghanistan	35.959	69.417	50	5.9	M_{w} (HRV).	
April 22, 2002	04:57	Near the coast of Peru	-12.386	-76.518	1	4.4	M_{b} (USGS).	
April 24, 2002	10:51	Serbia, Yugoslavia	42.436	21.466	1	5.7	M_{w} (HRV).	
April 24, 2002	19:48	Western Iran	34.642	47.400	2	5.4	M_{w} (HRV).	
April 25, 2002	17:41	Georgia	41.765	44.960	7	4.8	M_{b} (USGS).	
April 26, 2002	16:06	Guam region	13.088	144.619	0	7.1	M_{w} (HRV, USGS).	
May 15, 2002	03:46	Taiwan	24.636	121.922	1	6.2	M_{w} (HRV, USGS).	
May 18, 2002	15:15	Lake Victoria region, Tanzania	-2.907	33.733	2	5.5	M_{w} (HRV).	
June 22, 2002	02:58	Western Iran see 2002 Bou'in–Zahra earthquake	35.626	49.047	230	6.5	M_{w} (HRV, USGS).	
June 28, 2002	17:19	Jilin–Heilongjiang border region, China	43.752	130.666	0	7.3	M_{w} (HRV, USGS).	
August 19, 2002	11:01	Fiji region	-21.696	-179.513	0	7.7	M_{w} (HRV).	
August 19, 2002	11:08	South of the Fiji Islands	-23.884	178.495	0	7.7	M_{w} (HRV, USGS).	
September 6, 2002	01:21	Sicily, Italy	38.381	13.701	2	6.0	M_{w} (HRV).	
September 8, 2002	18:44	Near the north coast of New Guinea, Papua New Guinea see 2002 Sandaun earthquake	-3.302	142.945	6	7.6	M_{w} (HRV).	
September 13, 2002	22:28	Andaman Islands, India region	13.036	93.068	2	6.5	M_{w} (HRV, USGS).	
October 10, 2002	10:50	Near the north coast of Papua, Indonesia	-1.757	134.297	8	7.6	M_{w} (HRV).	
October 24, 2002	06:08	Lac Kivu region, Democratic Republic of the Congo see 2002 Kalehe earthquake	-1.884	29.004	2	6.2	M_{w} (HRV).	
October 31, 2002	10:32	Southern Italy see 2002 Molise earthquakes	41.789	14.872	29	5.9	M_{w} (USGS).	
November 1, 2002	22:09	Northwestern Kashmir	35.517	74.654	11	5.4	M_{w} (HRV).	
November 2, 2002	01:26	Simeulue, Indonesia see 2002 Sumatra earthquake	2.824	96.085	3	7.4	M_{w} (USGS).	
November 3, 2002	22:12	Central Alaska, United States see 2002 Denali earthquake	63.517	-147.444	0	7.9	M_{w} (HRV).	
November 17, 2002	04:53	Northwest of the Kuril Islands, Russia	47.824	146.209	0	7.3	M_{w} (HRV, USGS).	
November 20, 2002	21:32	Northwestern Kashmir	35.414	74.515	19	6.3	M_{w} (HRV).	
December 14, 2002	13:27	Gansu, China	39.736	97.443	2	5.6	M_{w} (USGS).	

== 2003 ==
Date	Time (UTC)	Place	Lat.	Long.	Fatalities	Magnitude	Comments	Sources
January 20, 2003	08:43	Solomon Islands	-10.491	160.770	0	7.3	M_{w} (HRV).	
January 21, 2003	02:46	Near the coast of Guatemala	13.626	-90.774	1	6.5	M_{w} (HRV).	
January 22, 2003	02:06	Offshore Colima, Mexico see 2003 Colima earthquake	18.770	-104.104	29	7.6	M_{w} (USGS).	
January 27, 2003	05:26	Eastern Turkey	39.500	39.878	1	6.1	M_{w} (HRV).	
February 24, 2003	02:03	Southern Xinjiang, China see 2003 Bachu earthquake	39.610	77.230	261	6.3	M_{w} (HRV, USGS).	
February 25, 2003	03:52	Southern Xinjiang, China see 2003 Bachu earthquake	39.483	77.393	5	5.4	M_{w} (HRV).	
March 17, 2003	16:36	Rat Islands, Aleutian Islands, Alaska, United States	51.272	177.978	0	7.1	M_{w} (USGS).	
March 25, 2003	02:53	Flores region, Indonesia	-8.294	120.743	4	6.5	M_{w} (HRV).	
March 29, 2003	11:46	Hindu Kush region, Afghanistan	35.976	70.585	1	5.9	M_{w} (USGS).	
May 1, 2003	00:27	Eastern Turkey see 2003 Bingöl earthquake	39.007	40.464	177	6.4	M_{w} (HRV, USGS).	
May 1, 2003	15:44	Southern Xinjiang, China	39.430	77.219	1	5.8	M_{w} (HRV).	
May 21, 2003	18:44	Northern Algeria see 2003 Boumerdès earthquake	36.964	3.634	2,266	6.8	M_{w} (HRV).	
May 26, 2003	09:24	Near the east coast of Honshu, Japan	38.849	141.568	0	7.0	M_{w} (HRV, USGS).	
May 26, 2003	19:23	Halmahera, Indonesia	2.354	128.855	1	7.0	M_{w} (HRV).	
May 27, 2003	17:11	Northern Algeria see 2003 Boumerdès earthquake	36.939	3.578	9	5.8	M_{w} (USGS).	
June 20, 2003	06:19	Amazonas, Brazil	-7.606	-71.722	0	7.1	M_{w} (HRV).	
June 24, 2003	13:01	Western Iran	32.927	49.475	1	4.6	M_{b} (USGS).	
July 10, 2003	17:06	Southern Iran	28.355	54.169	1	5.8	M_{w} (HRV).	
July 15, 2003	20:27	Carlsberg Ridge	-2.598	68.382	0	7.6	M_{w} (HRV).	
July 21, 2003	15:16	Yunnan, China	25.975	101.290	19	6.0	M_{w} (USGS).	
July 26, 2003	23:18	India–Bangladesh border region	22.854	92.306	2	5.7	M_{w} (HRV). Most damage took place in Bangladesh.	
August 4, 2003	04:37	Scotia Sea	-60.532	-43.411	0	7.6	M_{w} (HRV).	
August 16, 2003	10:58	Eastern Nei Mongol, China	43.770	119.643	4	5.4	M_{w} (HRV, USGS).	
August 21, 2003	12:12	South Island of New Zealand	-45.104	167.144	0	7.2	M_{w} (HRV).	
September 22, 2003	04:45	Dominican Republic region see 2003 Dominican Republic earthquake	19.777	-70.673	3	6.4	M_{w} (HRV, USGS).	
September 25, 2003	19:50	Hokkaido, Japan region see 2003 Tokachi earthquake	41.815	143.910	3	8.3	M_{w} (HRV).	
September 25, 2003	21:08	Hokkaido, Japan region see 2003 Tokachi earthquake	41.774	143.593	3	7.4	M_{w} (HRV).	
September 27, 2003	11:33	Southwestern Siberia, Russia see 2003 Altai earthquake	50.038	87.813	3	7.3	M_{w} (HRV, USGS).	
October 16, 2003	12:28	Yunnan, China	25.954	101.254	3	5.6	M_{w} (HRV).	
October 25, 2003	12:41	Gansu–Qinghai border region, China	38.400	100.951	9	5.8	M_{w} (HRV, USGS).	
October 31, 2003	01:06	Off the east coast of Honshu, Japan	37.812	142.619	0	7.0	M_{w} (HRV, USGS).	
November 13, 2003	02:35	Gansu, China	34.712	103.834	1	5.1	M_{w} (HRV).	
November 14, 2003	18:49	Sichuan–Yunnan–Guizhou region, China	27.372	103.971	4	5.6	M_{w} (HRV).	
November 17, 2003	06:43	Rat Islands, Aleutian Islands, Alaska, United States	51.146	178.650	0	7.8	M_{w} (HRV).	
November 18, 2003	17:14	Samar, Philippines	12.025	125.416	1	6.5	M_{w} (HRV, USGS).	
December 1, 2003	01:38	Kazakhstan–Xinjiang border region see 2003 Zhaosu earthquake	42.905	80.515	10	6.0	M_{w} (HRV). Most damage took place in Xinjiang, China.	
December 22, 2003	19:15	Central California, United States see 2003 San Simeon earthquake	35.706	-121.102	2	6.6	M_{w} (HRV).	
December 25, 2003	07:11	Panama–Costa Rica border region see 2003 Puerto Armuelles earthquake	8.416	-82.824	2	6.5	M_{w} (HRV, USGS). Most damage took place in Panama.	
December 26, 2003	01:56	Southeastern Iran see 2003 Bam earthquake	29.004	58.337	34,000	6.6	M_{w} (USGS) Centred 185 km SE of Kerman, Iran, at a depth of 10 km.	
December 27, 2003	16:00	Southeast of the Loyalty Islands, New Caledonia	-22.033	169.650	0	7.3	M_{w} (USGS) Centred 185 km ESE of Tadine, Loyalty Islands, New Caledonia, at a depth of 10 km.	

== 2004 ==
Date	Time (UTC)	Place	Lat.	Long.	Fatalities	Magnitude	Comments	Source
January 1, 2004	20:59	Bali region, Indonesia	-8.310	115.788	1	5.8	M_{w} (HRV, USGS).	
January 3, 2004	16:23	Southeast of the Loyalty Islands, New Caledonia	-22.253	169.683	0	7.1	M_{w} (HRV).	
February 5, 2004	21:05	Papua, Indonesia see February 2004 Nabire earthquakes	-3.615	135.538	37	7.0	M_{w} (USGS) Centred 95 km WNW of Enarotali, Irian Jaya, Indonesia, at a depth of 16 km.	
February 7, 2004	02:42	Papua, Indonesia see February 2004 Nabire earthquakes	-4.003	135.023	37	7.3	M_{w} (USGS) Centred 150 km west of Enarotali, Irian Jaya, Indonesia, at a depth of 10 km.	
February 14, 2004	10:30	Pakistan	34.774	73.216	24	5.5	M_{w} (USGS).	
February 16, 2004	14:44	Southern Sumatra, Indonesia	-0.466	100.655	5	5.1	M_{w} (HRV).	
February 24, 2004	02:14	Burundi	-3.393	29.558	3	4.7	M_{b} (USGS).	
February 24, 2004	02:27	Near north coast of Morocco see 2004 Al Hoceima earthquake	35.142	-3.997	631	6.4	M_{w} (USGS) Centred 160 km NE of Fes, Morocco, at a depth of 69.2 km.	
March 1, 2004	23:55	Eastern Turkey	38.058	38.277	6	3.8	M_{D} (ISK).	
March 25, 2004	19:30	Eastern Turkey	39.930	40.812	10	5.6	M_{w} (HRV, USGS).	
April 5, 2004	21:24	Hindu Kush region, Afghanistan	36.527	71.028	3	6.6	M_{w} (USGS) Centred 75 km SSE of Feyzabad, Afghanistan, at a depth of 191.4 km.	
May 1, 2004	07:56	Taiwan	24.081	121.611	2	5.2	M_{w} (HRV).	
May 8, 2004	20:11	Pakistan	30.126	67.121	1	4.4	M_{b} (USGS).	
May 28, 2004	12:38	Northern Iran see 2004 Baladeh earthquake	36.270	51.575	35	6.3	M_{w} (USGS) Centred 70 km NNE of TEHRAN, Iran, at a depth of 29 km.	
July 1, 2004	22:30	Eastern Turkey	39.799	43.778	18	5.2	M_{w} (USGS) Centred 65 km east of Karakose (Ağrı), Turkey, at a depth of 41.7 km.	
July 12, 2004	13:04	Slovenia	46.296	13.641	1	5.2	M_{w} (HRV).	
July 15, 2004	04:27	Fiji region	-17.656	-178.760	0	7.1	M_{w} (HRV).	
July 18, 2004	04:22	North Island of New Zealand	-38.000	176.510	1	5.6	M_{w} (USGS).	
July 18, 2004	08:31	Central Afghanistan	33.426	69.524	2	5.2	M_{w} (HRV).	
July 25, 2004	14:35	Southern Sumatra, Indonesia	-2.455	103.977	0	7.3	M_{w} (USGS) Centred 105 km NW of Palembang, Sumatra, Indonesia, at a depth of 576 km.	
July 30, 2004	07:14	Eastern Turkey	39.634	43.966	1	4.8	M_{b} (USGS).	
August 10, 2004	10:26	Sichuan–Yunnan–Guizhou region, China	27.266	103.873	4	5.4	M_{w} (HRV).	
August 11, 2004	15:48	Eastern Turkey	38.377	39.261	1	5.7	M_{w} (HRV).	
September 5, 2004	10:07	Near south coast of western Honshu, Japan	33.062	136.608	0	7.2	M_{w} (USGS) Centred 180 km south of Tsu, Honshu, Japan, at a depth of 14 km.	
September 5, 2004	14:57	Near the south coast of Honshu, Japan	33.216	137.061	0	7.4	M_{w} (USGS) Centred 135 km NE of Il'pyrskiy, Russia, at a depth of 10 km.	
September 7, 2004	11:53	Catamarca, Argentina	-28.573	-65.840	1	6.4	M_{w} (USGS).	
September 15, 2004	08:35	Bali region, Indonesia	-8.773	115.357	1	5.4	M_{w} (HRV).	
October 23, 2004	08:56	Near the west coast of Honshu, Japan see 2004 Chūetsu earthquake	37.231	138.753	46	6.6	M_{w} (USGS) Centred 80 km SSW of Niigata, Honshu, Japan, at a depth of 16 km.	
November 11, 2004	21:26	2004 Alor earthquake, Indonesia	-8.172	124.856	34	7.5	M_{w} (USGS) Centred 90 km WNW of DILI, East Timor, at a depth of 10 km.	
November 15, 2004	09:06	Near the west coast of Colombia	4.679	-77.511	0	7.2	M_{w} (USGS) Centred 100 km NNW of Buenaventura, Colombia, at a depth of 15 km.	
November 20, 2004	08:07	Costa Rica	9.581	-84.228	8	6.4	M_{w} (USGS) Centred 40 km SSW of SAN JOSE, Costa Rica, at a depth of 16 km.	
November 21, 2004	11:41	Dominica region, Leeward Islands	15.699	-61.654	1	6.3	M_{w} (USGS) Centred 35 km SSE of BASSE–TERRE, Guadeloupe, France, at a depth of 14 km.	
November 22, 2004	20:26	Off west coast of the South Island, New Zealand	-46.694	164.777	0	7.1	M_{w} (USGS) Centred 275 km west of Invercargill, New Zealand, at a depth of 10 km.	
November 26, 2004	02:25	Papua, Indonesia	-3.573	135.346	32	7.1	M_{w} (USGS) Centred 110 km WNW of Enarotali, Papua, Indonesia, at a depth of 10 km.	
November 28, 2004	18:32	Hokkaido, Japan region	42.995	145.056	0	7.0	M_{w} (USGS) Centred 55 km east of Kushiro, Hokkaido, Japan, at a depth of 39 km.	
December 1, 2004	23:17	Papua, Indonesia	-3.665	135.528	1	5.5	M_{w} (HRV, USGS).	
December 23, 2004	14:59	North of Macquarie Island, Australia	-50.145	160.365	0	8.1	M_{w} (USGS) Centred 400 km west of Auckland Island, New Zealand, at a depth of 10 km.	
December 26, 2004	00:58	Off the west coast of northern Sumatra, Indonesia see 2004 Indian Ocean earthquake and tsunami	3.316	95.854	227,898	9.1	M_{w} (USGS) Centred 250 km SSE of Banda Aceh, Sumatra, Indonesia, at a depth of 30 km. Most damage took place in Indonesia.	
December 26, 2004	04:21	Nicobar Islands, India region	6.910	92.958	0	7.2	M_{wc} (USGS) Centred 284km WNW of Sabang, Indonesia, at a depth of 39.2km.	

== 2005 ==
Date	Time (UTC)	Place	Lat.	Long.	Fatalities	Magnitude	Comments	Source
January 23, 2005	20:10	Sulawesi, Indonesia	-1.198	119.933	1	6.3	M_{w} (HRV).	
January 25, 2005	16:44	Turkey–Iraq border region	37.622	43.703	2	5.9	M_{w} (HRV). Most damage took place in Turkey.	
February 2, 2005	05:55	Java, Indonesia	-7.037	107.819	1	4.8	M_{b} (USGS).	
February 5, 2005	12:23	Celebes Sea	5.358	123.209	2	7.1	M_{w} (USGS) Centred 210 km SE of Zamboanga, Mindanao, Philippines, at a depth of 501.3 km. All the fatalities are Malaysians.	
February 22, 2005	02:25	Central Iran see 2005 Zarand earthquake	30.741	56.877	612	6.4	M_{w} (USGS) Centred 55 km NNW of Kerman, Iran, at a depth of 14 km.	
March 2, 2005	10:42	Banda Sea	-6.527	129.933	0	7.1	M_{w} (HRV, USGS).	
March 9, 2005	10:15	South Africa	-26.913	26.789	2	5.0	M_{b} (USGS).	
March 20, 2005	01:53	Kyushu, Japan see 2005 Fukuoka earthquake	33.805	130.078	1	6.6	M_{w} (USGS) Centred 30 km NW of Fukuoka, Kyushu, Japan, at a depth of 10 km.	
March 28, 2005	16:09	Northern Sumatra, Indonesia see 2005 Nias–Simeulue earthquake	2.074	97.013	1,313	8.6	M_{w} (USGS) Centred 205 km WNW of Sibolga, Sumatra, Indonesia, at a depth of 30 km.	
May 3, 2005	07:21	Western Iran	33.711	48.685	4	4.9	M_{w} (HRV).	
June 4, 2005	14:50	Eastern New Guinea region, Papua New Guinea	-6.319	146.846	1	6.1	M_{w} (HRV, USGS).	
June 13, 2005	22:44	Tarapacá, Chile see 2005 Tarapacá earthquake	-19.934	-69.028	11	7.8	M_{w} (USGS) Centred 125 km ENE of Iquique, Chile, at a depth of 117.2 km.	
June 15, 2005	02:50	Off the coast of northern California, United States	41.284	-125.983	0	7.2	M_{w} (USGS) Centred 160 km WSW of Crescent City, California, United States, at a depth of 10 km.	
July 5, 2005	16:53	South Africa	-26.47	27.43	1	2.7	M_{L} (PRE).	
July 24, 2005	15:42	Nicobar Islands, India region	7.909	92.139	0	7.3	M_{w} (USGS) Centred 135 km west of Misha, Nicobar Islands, India, at a depth of 16 km.	
July 25, 2005	15:43	Heilongjiang, China	46.827	125.058	1	5.0	M_{w} (HRV).	
August 16, 2005	02:46	Near the east coast of Honshu, Japan see 2005 Miyagi earthquake	38.251	142.059	0	7.2	M_{w} (USGS) Centred 105 km east of Sendai, Honshu, Japan, at a depth of 36 km.	
September 9, 2005	07:26	New Ireland region, Papua New Guinea	-4.539	153.445	0	7.7	M_{w} (USGS) Centred 45 km east of Taron, New Ireland, Papua New Guinea, at a depth of 91.3 km.	
September 26, 2005	01:55	Northern Peru see 2005 Northern Peru earthquake	-5.674	-76.409	5	7.5	M_{w} (USGS) Centred 75 km NE of Moyobamba, Peru, at a depth of 127.4 km.	
October 8, 2005	03:50	Pakistan see 2005 Kashmir earthquake	34.493	73.629	87,351	7.6	M_{w} (USGS) Centred 105 km NNE of Islamabad, Pakistan, at a depth of 26 km.	
October 15, 2005	04:24	Southwestern Kashmir	34.014	74.003	2	5.2	M_{b} (USGS).	
October 20, 2005	21:40	Near the coast of western Turkey	38.152	26.751	1	5.9	M_{w} (USGS).	
October 27, 2005	11:18	Guangxi, China	23.604	107.798	1	4.2	M_{b} (USGS).	
November 8, 2005	07:54	South China Sea	9.973	108.287	1	5.3	M_{w} (HRV). The fatality is a Vietnamese.	
November 14, 2005	21:38	Off the east coast of Honshu, Japan	38.101	144.925	0	7.0	M_{w} (USGS) Centred 350 km east of Sendai, Honshu, Japan, at a depth of 11 km.	
November 26, 2005	00:49	Hubei–Jiangxi border region, China see 2005 Ruichang earthquake	29.671	115.688	16	5.2	M_{w} (USGS).	
November 27, 2005	10:22	Southern Iran see 2005 Qeshm earthquake	26.784	55.847	13	6.0	M_{w} (USGS) Centred 65 km SW of Bandar–e Abbas, Iran, at a depth of 10 km.	
December 5, 2005	12:19	Lake Tanganyika region, Congo–Tanzania see 2005 Lake Tanganyika earthquake	-6.174	29.717	6	6.8	M_{w} (USGS) Centred 70 km ESE of Kalemie, Democratic Republic of the Congo, at a depth of 22 km. Most damage took place in Democratic Republic of the Congo.	
December 12, 2005	21:47	Hindu Kush region, Afghanistan; See 2005 Hindu Kush earthquake	36.332	71.130	5	6.6	M_{w} (USGS) Centred 95 km NW of Chitral, Pakistan, at a depth of 225.4 km.	
December 14, 2005	07:09	Uttaranchal, India	30.476	79.255	1	5.1	M_{w} (HRV).	

== 2006 ==
Date	Time (UTC)	Place	Lat.	Long.	Fatalities	Magnitude	Comments	Source
January 2, 2006	06:10	East of the South Sandwich Islands	-60.807	-21.474	0	7.4	M_{w} (USGS) Centred 345 km SE from Bristol Island, South Sandwich Islands, at a depth of 10 km.	
January 2, 2006	22:13	Fiji region	-19.926	-178.178	0	7.2	M_{w} (HRV).	
January 27, 2006	16:58	Banda Sea	-5.482	128.093	0	7.6	M_{w} (USGS) Centred 200 km south of Ambon, Moluccas, Indonesia, at a depth of 397 km.	
February 14, 2006	00:55	Sikkim, India	27.355	88.355	2	5.3	M_{w} (USGS) Centred 25 km west of Gangtok, Sikkim, India, at a depth of 36.9 km.	
February 22, 2006	22:19	Mozambique see 2006 Mozambique earthquake	-21.259	33.480	4	7.0	M_{w} (USGS) Centred 215 km SW of Beira, Mozambique, at a depth of 11 km.	
March 10, 2006	07:50	Pakistan	33.129	73.887	1	4.9	M_{w} (HRV).	
March 14, 2006	06:57	Seram, Indonesia	-3.593	127.211	3 dead 1 missing	6.7	M_{w} (USGS) Centred 105 km west of Ambon, Moluccas, Indonesia, at a depth of 30.6 km.	
March 20, 2006	19:44	Northern Algeria	36.623	5.328	4	5.2	M_{w} (HRV).	
March 25, 2006	07:28	Southern Iran	27.574	55.685	1	5.9	M_{w} (HRV).	
March 31, 2006	01:17	Western Iran see 2006 Borujerd earthquake	33.581	48.794	70	6.1	M_{w} (USGS) Centred 45 km ENE of Khorramabad, Iran, at a depth of 7 km.	
April 20, 2006	23:25	Koryakia, Russia see 2006 Kamchatka earthquake	61.075	167.085	0	7.6	M_{w} (USGS) Centred 195 km NE of Il'pyrskiy, Russia, at a depth of 22 km.	
April 25, 2006	11:26	Tasmania, Australia region	-41.164	146.863	1	2.2	M_{L} (USGS) Centred 3km east of Beauty Point, Australia, at a depth of 4.3km.	
May 3, 2006	15:26	Tonga see 2006 Tonga earthquake	-20.130	-174.164	0	8.0	M_{w} (USGS) Centred 160 km NE of NUKU'ALOFA, Tonga, at a depth of 55 km.	
May 16, 2006	10:39	Kermadec Islands region, New Zealand	-31.527	-179.303	0	7.4	M_{w} (USGS) Centred 55 km SW of L'Esperance Rock, Kermadec Islands, New Zealand, at a depth of 151.6 km.	
May 26, 2006	22:53	Java, Indonesia see 2006 Yogyakarta earthquake	-7.962	110.458	5,782	6.3	M_{w} (USGS) Centred 20 km SSE of Yogyakarta, Java, Indonesia, at a depth of 10 km.	
June 3, 2006	07:15	Southern Iran	26.759	55.843	2	5.1	M_{w} (HRV).	
July 17, 2006	08:19	South of Java, Indonesia see 2006 Pangandaran earthquake and tsunami	-9.222	107.320	730	7.7	M_{w} (USGS) Centred 230 km NE of Christmas Island, at a depth of 34 km.	
July 22, 2006	01:10	Sichuan–Yunnan–Guizhou region, China	27.995	104.138	22	4.9	M_{w} (HRV).	
July 29, 2006	00:11	Tajikistan	37.255	68.828	3	5.6	M_{w} (HRV).	
August 20, 2006	03:41	Scotia Sea	-61.006	-34.391	0	7.0	M_{w} (USGS) Centred 495 km WSW of Bristol Island, South Sandwich Islands, at a depth of 10 km.	
August 25, 2006	05:51	Eastern Sichuan, China	28.012	104.151	1	5.0	M_{w} (HRV).	
September 29, 2006	18:23	Offshore Sucre, Venezuela	10.763	-61.807	1	5.5	M_{w} (USGS) Centred 35 km WNW of PORT–OF–SPAIN, Trinidad, at a depth of 89.6 km.	
November 15, 2006	11:14	Kuril Islands, Russia see 2006 Kuril Islands earthquake	46.607	153.230	0	8.3	M_{w} (USGS) Centred 445 km ENE of Kuril'sk, Kuril Islands, Russia, at a depth of 30.3 km.	
December 1, 2006	14:01	Sumbawa region, Indonesia	-8.261	118.753	1	6.3	M_{w} (GCMT).	
December 17, 2006	21:39	Northern Sumatra, Indonesia	0.626	99.859	7	5.8	M_{w} (GCMT).	
December 26, 2006	12:26	Taiwan region see 2006 Hengchun earthquakes	21.825	120.538	2	7.1	M_{w} (USGS) Centred 90 km SSE of Kao–hsiung, Taiwan, at a depth of 10 km.	

== 2007 ==
Date	Time (UTC)	Place	Lat.	Long.	Fatalities	Magnitude	Comments	Source
January 13, 2007	04:23	East of the Kuril Islands, Russia see 2007 Kuril Islands earthquake	46.272	154.455	0	8.1	M_{w} (USGS) Centred 510 km SSW of Severo–Kuril'sk, Kuril Islands, Russia, at a depth of 10 km.	
January 21, 2007	11:27	Molucca Sea	1.222	126.395	4	7.5	M_{w} (USGS) Centred 125 km WNW of Ternate, Moluccas, Indonesia, at a depth of 22 km.	
March 6, 2007	03:49	Southern Sumatra, Indonesia see March 2007 Sumatra earthquakes	-0.512	100.524	67	6.4	M_{w} (USGS) Centred 50 km NNE of Padang, Sumatra, Indonesia, at a depth of 19 km.	
March 25, 2007	00:40	Vanuatu	-20.666	169.426	0	7.1	M_{w} (USGS) Centred 120 km south of Isangel, Tanna, Vanuatu, at a depth of 35 km.	
March 25, 2007	00:41	Near the west coast of Honshu, Japan see 2007 Noto earthquake	37.281	136.602	1	6.7	M_{w} (USGS) Centred 80 km north of Kanazawa, Honshu, Japan, at a depth of 5 km.	
April 1, 2007	20:39	Solomon Islands see 2007 Solomon Islands earthquake	-8.481	156.978	54	8.1	M_{w} (USGS) Centred 45 km SSE of Gizo, New Georgia Islands, Solomon Islands, at a depth of 5 km.	
April 21, 2007	17:53	Aisén, Chile see 2007 Aysén Fjord earthquakes	-45.274	-72.604	3 dead 7 missing	6.2	M_{w} (USGS) Centred 55 km NW of Coihaique, Chile, at a depth of 44.1 km.	
June 2, 2007	21:34	Yunnan, China	23.013	101.053	3	6.2	M_{w} (USGS) Centred 115 km NNE of Yunjinghong, Yunnan, China, at a depth of 10 km.	
July 16, 2007	01:13	Near the west coast of Honshu, Japan see 2007 Chuetsu offshore earthquake	37.576	138.469	9	6.6	M_{w} (USGS) Centred 70 km WSW of Niigata, Honshu, Japan, at a depth of 10 km.	
July 21, 2007	22:44	Tajikistan	38.936	70.485	12	5.2	M_{w} (GCMT).	
August 1, 2007	17:08	Vanuatu	-15.736	167.745	0	7.2	M_{w} (USGS) Centred 70 km ESE of Luganville, Espiritu Santo, Vanuatu, at a depth of 120 km.	
August 2, 2007	02:37	Tatar Strait, Russia	47.116	141.798	2	6.2	M_{w} (USGS).	
August 8, 2007	17:04	Java, Indonesia	-5.968	107.655	0	7.5	M_{w} (USGS) Centred 110 km ENE of JAKARTA, Java, Indonesia, at a depth of 289.2 km.	
August 15, 2007	23:40	Near the coast of central Peru see 2007 Peru earthquake	-13.354	-76.509	519	8.0	M_{w} (USGS) Centred 50 km west of Chincha Alta, Peru, at a depth of 39 km.	
September 2, 2007	01:05	Santa Cruz Islands, Solomon Islands	-11.610	165.762	0	7.2	M_{w} (USGS) Centred 95 km south of Lata, Santa Cruz Islands, Solomon Islands, at a depth of 35 km.	
September 12, 2007	11:10	Southern Sumatra, Indonesia see September 2007 Sumatra earthquakes	-4.520	101.374	25	8.5	M_{w} (USGS) Centred 130 km SW of Bengkulu, Sumatra, Indonesia, at a depth of 34 km.	
September 12, 2007	23:49	Mentawai Islands region, Indonesia	-2.506	100.906	0	7.9	M_{w} (USGS) Centred 190 km SSE of Padang, Sumatra, Indonesia, at a depth of 30 km.	
September 13, 2007	03:35	Mentawai Islands region, Indonesia	-2.130	99.627	0	7.0	M_{w} (GCMT).	
September 28, 2007	13:38	Volcano Islands, Japan region	21.980	142.685	0	7.5	M_{w} (USGS) Centred 285 km NW of Farallon de Pajaros, N. Mariana Islands, United States, at a depth of 261.3 km.	
September 30, 2007	05:23	Auckland Islands, New Zealand region	-49.418	163.954	0	7.4	M_{w} (USGS) Centred 195 km NW of Auckland Island, New Zealand, at a depth of 10 km.	
October 26, 2007	06:50	Northwestern Kashmir	35.321	76.646	1	5.3	M_{w} (USGS) Centred 155 km NNW of Leh, Kashmir, at a depth of 10 km.	
October 31, 2007	03:30	Pagan region, Northern Mariana Islands, United States	18.854	145.315	0	7.2	M_{w} (USGS) Centred 40 km WNW of Agrihan, Northern Mariana Islands, United States, at a depth of 248.3 km.	
November 6, 2007	09:38	Gujarat, India	21.127	70.538	1	5.0	M_{w} (USGS) Centred 135 km SSW of Rajkot, Gujarat, India, at a depth of 33.3 km.	
November 7, 2007	04:12	Bohol, Philippines	9.714	124.669	1	5.0	M_{w} (USGS) Centred 85 km east of Tagbilaran, Bohol, Philippines, at a depth of 72.7 km.	
November 14, 2007	15:40	Antofagasta, Chile see 2007 Tocopilla earthquake	-22.204	-69.869	2	7.7	M_{w} (USGS) Centred 35 km ESE of Tocopilla, Chile, at a depth of 40 km.	
November 25, 2007	16:02	Sumbawa region, Indonesia	-8.294	118.360	3	6.5	M_{w} (USGS) Centred 50 km WNW of Raba, Sumbawa, Indonesia, at a depth of 42.5 km.	
November 29, 2007	19:00	Martinique region, Windward Islands, France see 2007 Martinique earthquake	14.943	-61.244	1	7.4	M_{w} (USGS) Centred 40 km SSE of ROSEAU, Dominica, at a depth of 146.2 km.	
December 9, 2007	02:03	Minas Gerais, Brazil	-15.049	-44.199	1	4.9	M_{w} (USGS) Centred 190 km north of Montes Claros, Minas Gerais, Brazil, at a depth of 10 km.	
December 9, 2007	07:28	South of the Fiji Islands	-25.872	-177.517	0	7.8	M_{w} (USGS) Centred 355 km north of Raoul Island, Kermadec Islands, at a depth of 149.2 km.	
December 19, 2007	09:30	Andreanof Islands, Aleutian Islands, Alaska, United States	51.495	-179.473	0	7.2	M_{w} (USGS) Centred 35 km WNW of Amatignak Island, Alaska, United States, at a depth of 56.3 km.	
December 20, 2007	07:55	Off east coast of the North Island, New Zealand see 2007 Gisborne earthquake	-38.842	177.930	1	6.6	M_{w} (USGS) Centred 50 km ESE of Gisborne, New Zealand, at a depth of 35.6 km.	

== 2008 ==
Date	Time (UTC)	Place	Lat.	Long.	Fatalities	Magnitude	Comments	Source
January 9, 2008	22:24	Northern Algeria	35.616	-0.570	1	4.6	M_{b} (USGS).	
January 22, 2008	17:14	Nias region, Indonesia	1.011	97.436	1	6.1	M_{w} (USGS) Centred 170 km WSW of Sibolga, Sumatra, Indonesia, at a depth of 20 km.	
February 3, 2008	07:34	Lac Kivu region, Democratic Republic of the Congo see 2008 Lake Kivu earthquake	-2.318	28.945	44	5.9	M_{w} (USGS) Centred 25 km NNE of Bukavu, Democratic Republic of the Congo, at a depth of 10 km.	
February 6, 2008	06:09	West Bengal, India	23.468	87.116	1	4.3	M_{w} (USGS) Centred 120 km NE of Jamshedpur, Jharkhand, India, at a depth of 10 km.	
February 14, 2008	02:07	Lac Kivu region, Democratic Republic of the Congo	-2.294	28.876	1	5.4	M_{w} (USGS) Centred 25 km north of Bukavu, Democratic Republic of the Congo, at a depth of 10 km.	
February 20, 2008	08:08	Simeulue, Indonesia	2.778	95.978	3	7.4	M_{w} (USGS) Centred 310 km SSE of Banda Aceh, Sumatra, Indonesia, at a depth of 35 km.	
February 25, 2008	08:36	Mentawai Islands region, Indonesia	-2.352	100.018	0	7.2	M_{w} (USGS) Centred 160 km SSW of Padang, Sumatra, Indonesia, at a depth of 35 km.	
March 20, 2008	22:33	Xinjiang–Xizang border region, China	35.445	81.392	0	7.2	M_{w} (USGS) Centred 225 km SE of Hotan, Xinjiang, China, at a depth of 22.9 km.	
April 9, 2008	12:46	Loyalty Islands, New Caledonia	-20.089	168.852	0	7.3	M_{w} (USGS) Centred 75 km SW of Isangel, Tanna, Vanuatu, at a depth of 33 km.	
April 12, 2008	00:30	Macquarie Island region, Australia	-55.681	158.527	0	7.1	M_{w} (USGS) Centred 120 km SSW of Macquarie Island, Australia, at a depth of 10 km.	
May 12, 2008	06:28	Eastern Sichuan, China see 2008 Sichuan earthquake	30.986	103.364	69,197 dead 18,392 missing	7.9	M_{w} (USGS) Centred 80 km WNW of Chengdu, Sichuan, China, at a depth of 19 km.	
May 24, 2008	19:20	Colombia see 2008 El Calvario earthquake	4.447	-73.670	11	5.6	M_{w} (USGS) Centred 35 km north of Villavicencio, Colombia, at a depth of 35 km.	
May 25, 2008	08:21	Sichuan–Gansu border region, China	32.587	105.424	8	6.0	M_{w} (USGS) Centred 40 km WNW of Guangyuan, Sichuan, China, at a depth of 10 km.	
June 6, 2008	20:02	Northern Algeria	35.883	-0.658	1	5.5	M_{w} (USGS).	
June 8, 2008	12:25	Greece see 2008 Peloponnese earthquake	38.000	21.468	2	6.4	M_{w} (USGS) Centred 35 km SSW of Patras, Greece, at a depth of 16 km.	
June 13, 2008	23:43	Eastern Honshu, Japan see 2008 Iwate–Miyagi Nairiku earthquake	39.122	140.678	13	6.9	M_{w} (USGS) Centred 75 km SSW of Morioka, Honshu, Japan, at a depth of 10 km.	
June 17, 2008	05:51	Sichuan–Gansu border region, China	32.761	105.554	2	4.8	M_{b} (USGS).	
June 30, 2008	06:17	South Sandwich Islands region	-58.169	-22.014	0	7.0	M_{w} (USGS) Centred 275 km ENE of Bristol Island, South Sandwich Islands, at a depth of 10 km.	
July 5, 2008	02:12	Sea of Okhotsk	53.888	152.869	0	7.7	M_{w} (USGS) Centred 395 km WNW of Petropavlovsk–Kamchatskiy, Russia, at a depth of 635.6 km.	
July 8, 2008	09:13	Southern Peru	-15.886	-71.727	1	6.2	M_{w} (USGS) Centred 60 km NNW of Arequipa, Peru, at a depth of 123 km.	
July 15, 2008	03:26	Dodecanese Islands, Greece see 2008 Dodecanese earthquake	35.800	27.860	1	6.4	M_{w} (UCMT).	
July 19, 2008	02:39	Off the east coast of Honshu, Japan	37.552	142.206	0	7.0	M_{w} (USGS) Centred 130 km ENE of Iwaki, Honshu, Japan, at a depth of 22 km.	
July 23, 2008	15:26	Eastern Honshu, Japan	39.802	141.463	1	6.8	M_{w} (USGS) Centred 35 km ENE of Morioka, Honshu, Japan, at a depth of 108 km.	
July 24, 2008	07:09	Sichuan–Gansu border region, China	32.747	105.542	1	5.7	M_{w} (UCMT).	
August 5, 2008	09:49	Sichuan–Gansu border region, China	32.756	105.494	4	6.0	M_{w} (GCMT).	
August 21, 2008	12:24	Myanmar–China border region see 2008 Yingjiang earthquakes	25.039	97.697	5	6.0	M_{w} (USGS). Most damage took place in China.	
August 30, 2008	08:30	Sichuan–Yunnan border region, China see 2008 Panzhihua earthquake	26.241	101.889	43	6.0	M_{w} (GCMT).	
August 31, 2008	08:31	Sichuan–Yunnan border region, China see 2008 Panzhihua earthquake	26.232	101.970	2	5.6	M_{w} (GCMT).	
September 9, 2008	03:07	Southern Sumatra, Indonesia	-3.872	103.069	2	5.4	M_{w} (USGS) Centred 90 km east of Bengkulu, Sumatra, Indonesia, at a depth of 38.8 km.	
September 10, 2008	11:00	Southern Iran see 2008 Qeshm earthquake	26.823	55.825	7	6.1	M_{w} (USGS) Centred 60 km SW of Bandar–e Abbas, Iran, at a depth of 15 km.	
September 16, 2008	21:47	Maharashtra, India	17.438	73.915	1	5.0	M_{b} (USGS).	
September 29, 2008	15:19	Kermadec Islands, New Zealand	-29.749	-177.678	0	7.0	M_{w} (USGS) Centred 50 km SSE of Raoul Island, Kermadec Islands, New Zealand, at a depth of 36 km.	
October 5, 2008	15:52	Kyrgyzstan see 2008 Kyrgyzstan earthquake	39.515	73.768	75	6.7	M_{w} (USGS) Centred 50 km NNE of Karakul, Tajikistan, at a depth of 27.6 km.	
October 6, 2008	08:30	Eastern Xizang, China see 2008 Damxung earthquake	29.761	90.320	10	6.4	M_{w} (USGS) Centred 75 km WNW of Lhasa, Xizang (Tibet), China, at a depth of 12 km.	
October 11, 2008	09:06	Caucasus region, Russia see 2008 Chechnya earthquake	43.372	46.254	13	5.8	M_{w} (GCMT).	
October 28, 2008	23:09	Pakistan see 2008 Ziarat earthquakes	30.656	67.361	215	6.4	M_{w} (USGS) Centred 60 km NE of Quetta, Pakistan, at a depth of 15 km.	
November 16, 2008	17:02	Minahasa, Sulawesi, Indonesia see 2008 Sulawesi earthquake	1.290	122.100	6	7.4	M_{w} (USGS) Centred 135 km NW of Gorontalo, Sulawesi, Indonesia, at a depth of 30 km.	
November 22, 2008	22:27	Czech Republic	49.914	18.455	2	4.1	M_{L} (GRF).	
November 24, 2008	09:02	Sea of Okhotsk	54.194	154.315	0	7.3	M_{w} (USGS) Centred 315 km WNW of Petropavlovsk–Kamchatskiy, Russia, at a depth of 491.6 km.	
December 9, 2008	18:53	Sichuan–Gansu border region, China	32.518	105.395	2	5.1	M_{w} (GCMT).	

== 2009 ==
Date	Time (UTC)	Place	Lat.	Long.	Fatalities	Magnitude	Comments	Source
January 3, 2009	19:43	Near the north coast of Papua, Indonesia see 2009 West Papua earthquakes	-0.408	132.886	5	7.7	M_{w} (USGS) Centred 145 km WNW of Manokwari, Papua, Indonesia, at a depth of 17 km.	
January 3, 2009	22:33	Near the north coast of Papua, Indonesia see 2009 West Papua earthquakes	-0.707	133.361	5	7.4	M_{w} (USGS) Centred 85 km WNW of Manokwari, Papua, Indonesia, at a depth of 23 km.	
January 4, 2009	05:10	Southern Greece	34.197	70.065	1	4.3	M_{b} (USGS).	
January 8, 2009	19:21	Costa Rica see 2009 Cinchona earthquake	10.197	-84.159	34 dead 64 missing	6.1	M_{w} (USGS) Centred 30 km NNW of San José, Costa Rica, at a depth of 4.5 km.	
January 15, 2009	17:49	East of the Kuril Islands, Russia	46.862	155.156	0	7.4	M_{w} (USGS) Centred 435 km south of Severo–Kuril'sk, Kuril Islands, Russia, at a depth of 4.5 km.	
February 11, 2009	17:34	Talaud Islands, Indonesia	3.902	126.400	0	7.2	M_{w} (USGS) Centred 280 km SSE of General Santos, Mindanao, Philippines, at a depth of 20 km.	
February 18, 2009	21:53	Kermadec Islands region, New Zealand	-27.464	-176.324	0	7.0	M_{w} (USGS) Centred 250 km NE of Raoul Island, Kermadec Islands, New Zealand, at a depth of 25 km.	
March 19, 2009	18:17	Tonga region	-23.050	-174.668	0	7.6	M_{w} (USGS) Centred 220 km SSE of Nuku?alofa, Tonga, at a depth of 34 km.	
April 6, 2009	01:32	Central Italy see 2009 L'Aquila earthquake	42.334	13.334	308	6.3	M_{w} (USGS) Centred 75 km west of Pescara, Italy, at a depth of 8.8 km.	
April 7, 2009	17:47	Central Italy see 2009 L'Aquila earthquake	42.275	13.464	1	5.5	M_{w} (USGS).	
April 16, 2009	21:27	Hindu Kush region, Afghanistan see April 2009 Afghanistan earthquake	34.185	70.076	22	5.4	M_{w} (GCMT).	
May 28, 2009	08:24	Offshore Honduras see 2009 Swan Islands earthquake	16.733	-86.220	7	7.3	M_{w} (USGS) Centred 125 km NNE of La Ceiba, Honduras, at a depth of 10 km.	
June 13, 2009	17:17	Eastern Kazakhstan	44.725	78.866	1	5.4	M_{w} (UCMT).	
July 9, 2009	11:19	Yunnan, China	25.636	101.082	1	5.7	M_{w} (USGS) Centred 100 km ENE of Dali, Yunnan, China, at a depth of 10 km.	
July 15, 2009	09:22	Off west coast of the South Island, New Zealand see 2009 Dusky Sound earthquake	-45.750	166.577	0	7.8	M_{w} (USGS) Centred 155 km WNW of Invercargill, New Zealand, at a depth of 12 km.	
August 8, 2009	13:26	Sichuan–Chongqing border region, China	29.358	105.438	2	3.7	M_{b} (USGS).	
August 9, 2009	10:55	Near the south coast of Honshu, Japan see 2009 Izu Islands earthquake	33.122	138.026	0	7.1	M_{w} (USGS) Centred 170 km south of Hamamatsu, Honshu, Japan, at a depth of 297 km.	
August 10, 2009	19:55	Andaman Islands, India region see 2009 Andaman Islands earthquake	14.013	92.923	0	7.5	M_{w} (USGS) Centred 270 km north of Port Blair, Andaman Islands, India, at a depth of 33.1 km.	
August 10, 2009	20:07	Near the south coast of Honshu, Japan see 2009 Shizuoka earthquake	34.778	138.276	1	6.1	M_{w} (USGS) Centred 30 km SSW of Shizuoka, Honshu, Japan, at a depth of 26 km.	
September 2, 2009	07:55	Java, Indonesia see 2009 West Java earthquake	-7.809	107.259	79	7.0	M_{w} (USGS) Centred 100 km SSW of Bandung, Java, Indonesia, at a depth of 46.2 km.	
September 21, 2009	08:53	Bhutan see 2009 Bhutan earthquake	27.346	91.412	11	6.1	M_{w} (USGS) Centred 130 km NNW of Gauhati, Assam, India, at a depth of 14 km.	
September 29, 2009	17:48	Samoa Islands region see 2009 Samoa earthquake and tsunami	-15.509	-172.034	189	8.1	M_{w} (USGS) Centred 185 km ENE of Hihifo, Tonga, at a depth of 18 km.	
September 30, 2009	10:16	Southern Sumatra, Indonesia see 2009 Sumatra earthquakes	-0.725	99.856	1115	7.6	M_{w} (USGS) Centred 60 km WNW of Padang, Sumatra, Indonesia, at a depth of 81 km.	
October 1, 2009	01:52	Southern Sumatra, Indonesia see 2009 Sumatra earthquakes	-2.508	101.484	3	6.6	M_{w} (USGS) Centred 165 km NNW of Bengkulu, Sumatra, Indonesia, at a depth of 15 km.	
October 7, 2009	22:03	Vanuatu	-13.052	166.187	0	7.7	M_{w} (USGS) Centred 265 km SSE of Lata, Santa Cruz Islands, Solomon Islands, at a depth of 35 km.	
October 7, 2009	22:18	Vanuatu	-12.554	166.320	0	7.8	M_{w} (USGS) Centred 210 km SSE of Lata, Santa Cruz Islands, Solomon Islands, at a depth of 35 km.	
October 7, 2009	23:13	Vanuatu	-13.145	166.297	0	7.4	M_{w} (USGS) Centred 270 km SSE of Lata, Santa Cruz Islands, Solomon Islands, at a depth of 33.3 km.	
October 22, 2009	19:51	Hindu Kush region, Afghanistan	36.517	70.950	5	6.2	M_{w} (USGS).	
November 8, 2009	19:41	Sumbawa region, Indonesia	-8.270	118.633	2	6.6	M_{w} (USGS) Centred 25 km NNW of Raba, Sumbawa, Indonesia, at a depth of 32.9 km.	
November 9, 2009	10:44	Fiji	-17.212	178.413	0	7.3	M_{w} (USGS) Centred 100 km north of Suva, Viti Levu, Fiji, at a depth of 585.1 km.	
December 6, 2009	21:51	South Africa	-26.414	27.494	2	3.5	M_{L} (PRE).	
December 8, 2009	03:08	Malawi see 2009 Karonga earthquakes	-9.948	33.878	1	5.9	M_{w} (USGS).	
December 19, 2009	23:19	Malawi see 2009 Karonga earthquakes	-10.108	33.818	3	6.0	M_{w} (USGS).	

== 2010 ==
Date	Time (UTC)	Place	Lat.	Long.	Fatalities	Magnitude	Comments	Source
January 3, 2010	22:36	Solomon Islands see 2010 Solomon Islands earthquake	-8.800	157.370	0	7.1	M_{w} (USGS) Centred 95 km SE of Gizo, New Georgia Islands, Solomon Islands, at a depth of 25 km.	
January 10, 2010	00:25	Java, Indonesia	-7.907	107.879	1	5.1	M_{b} (USGS).	
January 12, 2010	21:53	Haiti region see 2010 Haiti earthquake	18.443	-72.571	160,000~; 316,000	7.0	M_{w} (USGS) Centred 25 km WSW of PORT–AU–PRINCE, Haiti, at a depth of 13 km.	
January 17, 2010	09:37	Guizhou, China	25.558	105.804	7 dead 1 missing	4.4	M_{b} (USGS).	
January 30, 2010	21:36	Eastern Sichuan, China	30.268	105.668	1	5.1	M_{b} (USGS).	
February 26, 2010	20:31	Ryukyu Islands, Japan	25.902	128.417	0	7.0	M_{w} (USGS) Centred 80 km ESE of Naha, Okinawa, Japan, at a depth of 22 km.	
February 27, 2010	06:34	Offshore Bio–Bio, Chile see 2010 Chile earthquake	-35.909	-72.733	525 dead 25 missing	8.8	M_{w} (USGS) Centred 95 km NW of Chillan, Chile, at a depth of 35 km.	
February 27, 2010	15:45	Salta, Argentina see 2010 Salta earthquake	-24.872	-65.602	2	6.3	M_{w} (GCMT).	
March 8, 2010	02:32	Eastern Turkey see 2010 Elazığ earthquake	38.873	39.981	42	6.1	M_{w} (USGS) Centred 45 km west of Bingöl, Turkey, at a depth of 12 km.	
March 11, 2010	14:39	Libertador O Higgins, Chile see 2010 Pichilemu earthquakes	-34.259	-71.929	1	6.9	M_{w} (USGS) Centred 105 km west of Rancagua, Chile, at a depth of 11 km.	
April 4, 2010	22:40	Baja California, Mexico see 2010 Baja California earthquake	32.259	-115.287	4	7.2	M_{w} (USGS) Centred 50 km SSE of Mexicali, Baja California, Mexico, at a depth of 10 km.	
April 6, 2010	22:15	Northern Sumatra, Indonesia see 2010 Banyak Islands earthquake	2.360	97.132	0	7.8	M_{w} (USGS) Centred 200 km WNW of Sibolga, Sumatra, Indonesia, at a depth of 31 km.	
April 13, 2010	23:49	Southern Qinghai, China see 2010 Yushu earthquake	33.224	96.666	2,698 dead 270 missing	6.9	M_{w} (USGS) Centred 50 km WNW of Gyegu (Yushu), Qinghai, China, at a depth of 17 km.	
April 18, 2010	20:28	Central Afghanistan see 2010 Afghanistan earthquake	35.633	67.658	11	5.6	M_{w} (GCMT).	
May 14, 2010	12:29	Northern Algeria see 2010 Beni–Ilmane earthquakes	35.900	4.120	2	5.2	M_{b} (USGS).	
May 27, 2010	17:14	Vanuatu	-13.710	166.507	0	7.1	M_{w} (USGS) Centred 215 km NNW of Luganville, Espiritu Santo, Vanuatu, at a depth of 36.1 km.	
June 12, 2010	19:26	Nicobar Islands, India region	7.848	91.919	0	7.5	M_{w} (USGS) Centred 155 km west of Mohean, Nicobar Islands, India, at a depth of 35 km.	
June 16, 2010	03:16	Near the north coast of Papua, Indonesia see 2010 Papua earthquake	-2.171	136.549	17	7.0	M_{w} (USGS) Centred 195 km north of Enarotali, Papua, Indonesia, at a depth of 18 km.	
June 30, 2010	07:22	Oaxaca, Mexico see 2010 Oaxaca earthquake	16.527	-97.760	1	6.2	M_{w} (USGS) Centred 125 km WSW of Oaxaca, Oaxaca, Mexico, at a depth of 20 km.	
July 18, 2010	13:34	New Britain region, Papua New Guinea	-5.939	150.572	0	7.3	M_{w} (USGS) Centred 65 km SE of Kimbe, New Britain, Papua New Guinea, at a depth of 35 km.	
July 20, 2010	19:38	Southern Iran	27.022	53.861	1	5.8	M_{w} (GCMT).	
July 23, 2010	22:08	Moro Gulf, Mindanao, Philippines see 2010 Mindanao earthquakes	6.699	123.475	0	7.3	M_{w} (USGS) Centred 110 km WSW of Cotabato, Mindanao, Philippines, at a depth of 612.2 km.	
July 23, 2010	22:51	Moro Gulf, Mindanao, Philippines see 2010 Mindanao earthquakes	6.470	123.532	0	7.6	M_{w} (USGS) Centred 115 km SW of Cotabato, Mindanao, Philippines, at a depth of 583.8 km.	
July 23, 2010	23:15	Moro Gulf, Mindanao, Philippines see 2010 Mindanao earthquakes	6.792	123.282	0	7.4	M_{w} (USGS) Centred 115 km south of Pagadian, Mindanao, Philippines, at a depth of 631.2 km.	
August 4, 2010	22:01	New Britain region, Papua New Guinea	-5.768	150.776	0	7.0	M_{w} (USGS) Centred 75 km ESE of Kimbe, New Britain, Papua New Guinea, at a depth of 44 km.	
August 10, 2010	05:23	Vanuatu	-17.561	168.028	0	7.3	M_{w} (USGS) Centred 35 km WNW of PORT–VILA, Efate, Vanuatu, at a depth of 35 km.	
August 12, 2010	11:54	Ecuador	-1.260	-77.312	0	7.1	M_{w} (USGS) Centred 145 km east of Ambato, Ecuador, at a depth of 211 km.	
August 27, 2010	19:23	Northern Iran	35.490	54.470	3	5.8	M_{w} (GCMT).	
September 3, 2010	16:35	South Island of New Zealand see 2010 Canterbury earthquake	-43.530	172.120	0	7.0	M_{w} (USGS) Centred 45 km west of Christchurch, New Zealand, at a depth of 5 km.	
September 27, 2010	11:22	Southern Iran	29.637	51.666	1	5.9	M_{w} (GCMT).	
September 29, 2010	17:11	Near the south coast of Papua, Indonesia	-4.920	133.783	0	7.2	M_{w} (USGS) Centred 105 km NNW of Dobo, Aru Islands, Indonesia, at a depth of 12.3 km.	
October 10, 2010	21:44	Pakistan	33.869	72.887	1	5.2	M_{b} (USGS).	
October 25, 2010	14:42	Mentawai Islands region, Indonesia see 2010 Mentawai earthquake and tsunami	-3.484	100.114	408 dead 303 missing	7.7	M_{w} (USGS) Centred 240 km west of Bengkulu, Sumatra, Indonesia, at a depth of 20.6 km.	
November 3, 2010	00:56	Serbia see 2010 Kraljevo earthquake	43.718	20.624	2	5.3	M_{w} (USGS) Centred 40 km SW of Kragujevac, Serbia, at a depth of 10 km.	
December 20, 2010	18:41	Southeastern Iran see 2010 Hosseinabad earthquake	28.491	59.117	11	6.5	M_{w} (USGS) Centred 110 km SE of Bam, Iran, at a depth of 11.8 km.	
December 21, 2010	17:19	Ogasawara Islands, Japan region	26.892	143.726	0	7.4	M_{w} (USGS) Centred 150 km east of Chichi–shima, Ogasawara Islands, Japan, at a depth of 14 km.	
December 25, 2010	13:16	Vanuatu region	-19.775	167.895	0	7.3	M_{w} (USGS) Centred 145 km west of Isangel, Tanna, Vanuatu, at a depth of 12.3 km.	

Notes

1. A : A figure of about 160,000 is provided in a 2010 University of Michigan study.
2. B : Haitian government sources. The figure is not accurate.

All times are UTC, unless otherwise stated
ML = Richter scale
Mw = Moment magnitude
M_{b} = Body wave magnitude
HRV = Harvard University (Global CMT)
USGS = United States Geological Survey
