= List of earthquakes in 2004 =

Earthquakes in 2004
Approximate epicenters of notable earthquakes in 2004
- 4.0–5.9 magnitude
- 6.0–6.9 magnitude
- 7.0–7.9 magnitude
- 8.0+ magnitude
- Strongest: M_{w} 9.1 Indonesia
- Deadliest: M_{w} 9.1 Indonesia; 227,898 deaths
- Total fatalities: 228,863

Number by magnitude
- 9.0+: 1
- 8.0–8.9: 1
- 7.0–7.9: 14
- 6.0–6.9: 141
- 5.0–5.9: 1,511
- 4.0–4.9: 10,880

2004 had the most major earthquakes since 1999. In total, there were 16 magnitude 7 or greater earthquakes. The vast majority of the earthquake-related deaths in 2004 were caused by the 2004 Indian Ocean earthquake and tsunami off the west coast of Sumatra in December. There were several other deadly and destructive earthquakes, including the February 2004 Nabire earthquakes, the 2004 Al Hoceima earthquake, the 2004 Chūetsu earthquake, the Iran, the 2004 Battagram earthquake and the 2004 Doğubayazıt earthquake.

== Compared to other years ==
Number of earthquakes worldwide for 1999–2009 []
Magnitude	1999	2000	2001	2002	2003	2004	2005	2006	2007	2008	2009
8.0–9.9	0	1	1	0	1	2	1	2	4	1	1
7.0–7.9	18	15	14	13	14	14	10	9	14	12	16
6.0–6.9	117	145	122	126	139	141	139	142	178	167	143
5.0–5.9	1,057	1,334	1,212	1,170	1,212	1,511	1,694	1,726	2,090	1,786	1,912
4.0–4.9	7,004	7,968	7,969	8,479	8,455	10,880	13,893	12,843	12,081	12,294	6,817
Total	8,296	9,462	9,319	9,788	9,823	12,551	15,738	14,723	14,367	14,261	8,891

== By death toll ==
Rank	Death toll	Magnitude	Location	MMI	Depth (km)	Date	Event
1	227,898	9.1	Indonesia, Aceh offshore	IX (Violent)	30.0	December 26	2004 Indian Ocean earthquake and tsunami
2	631	6.4	Morocco, Al Hoceïma	IX (Violent)	12.2	February 24	2004 Al Hoceima earthquake
3	68	6.6	Japan, Niigata	XII (Extreme)	13.0	October 23	2004 Chūetsu earthquake
4	54	6.3	Iran, Mazandaran	VIII (Severe)	17.0	May 28	2004 Baladeh earthquake
5	37	7.0	Indonesia, Papua	VIII (Severe)	16.6	February 5	February 2004 Nabire earthquakes
6	34	7.5	Indonesia, East Nusa Tenggara offshore	X (Extreme)	10.0	November 11	2004 Alor earthquake
7	32	7.1	Indonesia, Papua	VIII (Severe)	24.0	November 26	November 2004 Nabire earthquake
8	24	5.5	Pakistan, Khyber Pakhtunkhwa	VIII (Severe)	11.0	February 13	2004 Battagram earthquake
9	18	5.1	Turkey, Ağrı	VII (Very strong)	5.0	July 2	2004 Doğubayazıt earthquake
10	10	5.6	Turkey, Erzurum	VII (Very strong)	10.0	March 25	-

Listed are earthquakes with at least 10 dead.

== By magnitude ==
Rank	Magnitude	Death toll	Location	MMI	Depth (km)	Date	Event
1	9.1	227,898	Indonesia, Aceh offshore	IX (Violent)	30.0	December 26	2004 Indian Ocean earthquake and tsunami
2	8.1	0	New Zealand offshore, Tasman Sea	V (Moderate)	10.0	December 23	2004 Tasman Sea earthquake
3	7.5	34	Indonesia, East Nusa Tenggara offshore	X (Extreme)	10.0	November 11	2004 Alor earthquake
4	7.4	0	Japan, Wakayama offshore	VI (Strong)	10.0	September 5	-
5	7.3	0	Indonesia, South Sumatra	IV (Light)	582.1	July 25	-
5	7.3	0	Indonesia, Papua	X (Extreme)	10.0	February 7	February 2004 Nabire earthquakes
7	7.2	0	Colombia, Chocó offshore	VIII (Severe)	15.0	November 15	-
7	7.2	0	India, Andaman and Nicobar Islands offshore	VI (Strong)	39.2	December 26	-
7	7.2	0	Japan, Wakayama offshore	VI (Strong)	14.0	September 5	-
10	7.1	32	Indonesia, Papua	VIII (Severe)	10.0	November 26	November 2004 Nabire earthquake
10	7.1	0	New Zealand, Southland offshore	V (Moderate)	10.0	November 23	-
10	7.1	0	Fiji, Lau offshore	I (Not felt)	565.5	July 15	-
10	7.1	0	New Caledonia, Loyalty Islands offshore	V (Moderate)	22.0	January 3	-
14	7.0	0	Japan, Hokkaido offshore	VIII (Severe)	39.0	November 29	-
14	7.0	0	Nicaragua, Carazo offshore	VIII (Severe)	35.0	October 9	-
14	7.0	37	Indonesia, Papua	VIII (Severe)	16.6	February 6	February 2004 Nabire earthquakes

Listed are earthquakes with at least 7.0 magnitude.

== By month ==
=== January ===
January
- Strongest: M_{w} 7.1 New Caledonia
- Deadliest: M_{w} 5.8 Indonesia; 1 death
- Total fatalities: 1

Number by magnitude
- 9.0+: 0
- 8.0–8.9: 0
- 7.0–7.9: 1
- 6.0–6.9: 13
- 5.0–5.9: 129
- 4.0–4.9: 764

Date	Country and location	M_{w}	Depth (km)	MMI	Notes	Casualties	
Date	Country and location	M_{w}	Depth (km)	MMI	Notes	Dead	Injured
1	Indonesia, Bali offshore, 24 km (15 mi) NE of Amlapura	5.8	44.5	VII	Seven people injured and 4,000 buildings damaged across Bali. One person killed, 22 injured and 2,000 buildings damaged in Lombok.	1	29
1	Mexico, Guerrero, 24 km (15 mi) SW of Petatlán	6.1	29.4	VI	Minor damage to buildings in Guerrero and power outages occurred in Mexico City.	-	-
3	New Caledonia, Loyalty Islands offshore, 211 km (131 mi) ESE of Tadine	6.0	10.0	-	Aftershocks of the 7.3 event on December 27, 2003.	-	-
3	New Caledonia, Loyalty Islands offshore, 185 km (115 mi) ESE of Tadine	6.1	10.0	-	Aftershocks of the 7.3 event on December 27, 2003.	-	-
3	New Caledonia, Loyalty Islands offshore, 198 km (123 mi) ESE of Tadine	6.4	10.0	-	Aftershocks of the 7.3 event on December 27, 2003.	-	-
3	New Caledonia, Loyalty Islands offshore, 202 km (126 mi) ESE of Tadine	7.1	10.0	V	Aftershocks of the 7.3 event on December 27, 2003.	-	-
3	New Caledonia, Loyalty Islands offshore, 232 km (144 mi) ESE of Tadine	6.1	10.0	-	Aftershocks of the 7.3 event on December 27, 2003.	-	-
9	Papua New Guinea, West New Britain, 22 km (14 mi) NW of Kandrian	6.3	57.7	VIII	-	-	-
10	Slovakia, Banská Bystrica offshore, 5 km (3.1 mi) ENE of Banská Bystrica	2.2	5.0	I	Minor damage in Slovenská Ľupča.	-	-
10	Algeria, Boumerdès offshore, 10 km (6.2 mi) NNW of Boumerdès	4.5	10.0	V	Aftershock of the 2003 Boumerdès earthquake. Three-hundred people injured and additional damage to previously weakened buildings in the Algiers-Boumerdès area.	-	300
11	South Indian Ocean	6.2	5.3	-	-	-	-
11	Fiji, Lau offshore, 280 km (170 mi) SE of Levuka	6.0	673.1	-	-	-	-
15	Papua New Guinea, New Ireland offshore, 109 km (68 mi) SSE of Kavieng	6.2	10.0	V	-	-	-
16	Central Mid-Atlantic Ridge	6.2	10.0	-	-	-	-
25	Tonga, Niua offshore, 105 km (65 mi) SSW of Hihifo	6.7	129.8	I	-	-	-
28	Indonesia, Maluku offshore, 107 km (66 mi) NW of Ambon	6.7	17.4	VI	A local tsunami was observed at Namlea.	-	-
29	Southern East Pacific Rise	6.1	10.0	-	-	-	-

=== February ===
February
- Strongest: M_{w} 7.3 Indonesia
- Deadliest: M_{w} 6.4 Morocco; 631 deaths
- Total fatalities: 703

Number by magnitude
- 9.0+: 0
- 8.0–8.9: 0
- 7.0–7.9: 2
- 6.0–6.9: 9
- 5.0–5.9: 101
- 4.0–4.9: 723

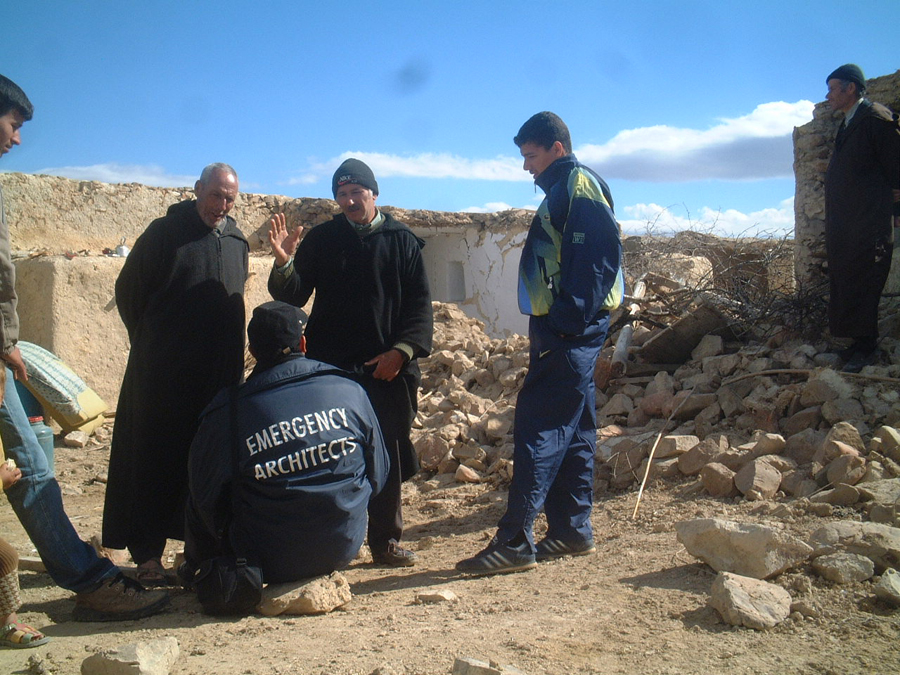
People at the site of a collapsed house in Al Hoceïma, Morocco

Date	Country and location	M_{w}	Depth (km)	MMI	Notes	Casualties	
Date	Country and location	M_{w}	Depth (km)	MMI	Notes	Dead	Injured
1	Panama, Chiriquí, 2 km (1.2 mi) S of Finca Blanco	6.1	10.0	IX	Four people injured, one bridge collapsed and three homes damaged in Chiriquí Province.	-	4
5	Indonesia, Papua, 28 km (17 mi) S of Nabire	7.0	16.6	VIII	Further information: February 2004 Nabire earthquakes	37	682
7	Indonesia, Papua, 89 km (55 mi) SW of Nabire	7.3	10.0	X	Further information: February 2004 Nabire earthquakes	-	-
8	Indonesia, Papua, 38 km (24 mi) SSW of Nabire	6.7	25.7	X	Further information: February 2004 Nabire earthquakes	-	-
11	Jordan, Madaba, 21 km (13 mi) SE of Mitzpe Yeriho, Palestine	5.3	26.7	VII	Four people injured and a landslide occurred in Ma'in. Minor damage to buildings in Jerusalem, Petah Tikva and Tel Aviv, Israel, and Nablus, Palestine.	-	4
14	Pakistan, Khyber Pakhtunkhwa, 20 km (12 mi) ENE of Battagram	5.5	11.0	VIII	Further information: 2004 Battagram earthquake	24	63
16	Indonesia, West Sumatra, 27 km (17 mi) S of Payakumbuh	5.1	55.8	VII	Five people killed, seven others injured and more than 100 houses damaged in Padang Panjang.	5	7
20	Solomon Islands, Temotu offshore, 120 km (75 mi) SE of Lata	6.0	84.0	-	-	-	-
21	(South Georgia and the South Sandwich Islands) east of the South Sandwich Islands	6.6	10.0	-	-	-	-
22	Indonesia, West Sumatra offshore, 69 km (43 mi) SSE of Padang	6.0	42.0	V	One person injured, four homes destroyed and many others damaged in South Pesisir Regency.	-	1
23	Tonga, Niua offshore, 171 km (106 mi) SSE of Mata Utu, Wallis and Futuna	6.3	31.0	-	-	-	-
24	Burundi, Muramvya, 14 km (8.7 mi) SSW of Muramvya	4.7	10.0	VI	Three people killed and 24 homes collapsed in Ruyaga.	3	-
24	Morocco, Al Hoceïma, 11 km (6.8 mi) SSW of Tirhanimîne	6.4	0.0	IX	Further information: 2004 Al Hoceima earthquake	631	926
25	Morocco, Al Hoceïma, 15 km (9.3 mi) WNW of Tirhanimîne	5.3	10.1	VII	Aftershocks of the 2004 Al Hoceima earthquake. Three people killed and several previously weakened homes destroyed in the epicentral area.	3	-
26	Morocco, Al Hoceïma, 20 km (12 mi) W of Tirhanimîne	5.0	10.8	VI	Aftershocks of the 2004 Al Hoceima earthquake. Three people killed and several previously weakened homes destroyed in the epicentral area.	3	-
26	Mauritius–Réunion region offshore	6.3	10.0	-	-	-	-
26	Australia, Macquarie Island offshore	6.0	10.0	-	-	-	-

=== March ===
March
- Strongest: M_{w} 6.2 Nicaragua; M_{w} 6.2 Tonga
- Deadliest: M_{w} 5.6 Turkey; 10 deaths
- Total fatalities: 16

Number by magnitude
- 9.0+: 0
- 8.0–8.9: 0
- 7.0–7.9: 0
- 6.0–6.9: 10
- 5.0–5.9: 110
- 4.0–4.9: 757

Date	Country and location	M_{w}	Depth (km)	MMI	Notes	Casualties	
Date	Country and location	M_{w}	Depth (km)	MMI	Notes	Dead	Injured
1	Greece, Peloponnese, 6 km (3.7 mi) ESE of Arfará	5.6	9.4	VII	Balconies collapsed, many buildings damaged and landslides in Kalamata.	-	-
1	Turkey, Adıyaman, 5 km (3.1 mi) NE of Çelikhan	3.8	5.0	V	Six people killed and two others injured after a house collapsed in Çelikhan.	6	2
2	Nicaragua, Managua offshore, 33 km (21 mi) SW of Masachapa	6.2	28.0	VII	Foreshock of the 7.0 event on October 9.	-	-
7	New Zealand offshore, south of the Kermadec Islands	6.0	7.0	-	-	-	-
8	Northern Mid-Atlantic Ridge	6.0	10.0	-	-	-	-
9	New Zealand offshore, south of the Kermadec Islands	6.2	18.4	-	-	-	-
12	Tonga, Niua offshore, 145 km (90 mi) WNW of Hihifo	6.0	271.5	-	-	-	-
14	Tonga, Niua offshore, 214 km (133 mi) SE of Hihifo	6.1	12.0	-	-	-	-
17	Bolivia, Potosi, 38 km (24 mi) NNE of Tupiza	6.1	289.8	III	-	-	-
17	Greece, Crete offshore, 74 km (46 mi) WSW of Kastri	6.1	24.5	VI	-	-	-
18	Tonga, ʻEua offshore, 289 km (180 mi) SSW of ʻOhonua	6.2	10.0	-	-	-	-
24	China, Inner Mongolia, 236 km (147 mi) NE of Xilinhot	5.5	18.8	VII	At least 100 people injured and 38,000 buildings damaged in the Bayan Ul Hot-Uliastai area. Damage estimated at US$74 million ($126.1 billion in 2025).	-	100
25	Turkey, Erzurum, 10 km (6.2 mi) E of Aşkale	5.6	10.0	VII	Ten people killed, 46 others injured and 45 buildings damaged or destroyed in Erzurum Province.	10	46
27	China, Tibet Autonomous Region, 385 km (239 mi) NW of Nagqu	6.0	8.0	VIII	-	-	-
28	Turkey, Erzurum, 17 km (11 mi) ESE of Aşkale	5.6	5.0	VII	Twelve people injured, 50 buildings in 10 villages damaged or destroyed and many livestock killed in Aşkale.	-	12

=== April ===
April
- Strongest: M_{w} 6.7 Indonesia
- Deadliest: M_{w} 6.6 Afghanistan; 3 deaths
- Total fatalities: 3

Number by magnitude
- 9.0+: 0
- 8.0–8.9: 0
- 7.0–7.9: 0
- 6.0–6.9: 19
- 5.0–5.9: 101
- 4.0–4.9: 826

Date	Country and location	M_{w}	Depth (km)	MMI	Notes	Casualties	
Date	Country and location	M_{w}	Depth (km)	MMI	Notes	Dead	Injured
3	Japan, Ibaraki offshore, 37 km (23 mi) ESE of Hitachi	6.0	31.0	V	One person injured in Naka.	-	1
5	Tonga, Ha‘apai offshore, 81 km (50 mi) SSE of Pangai	6.2	10.0	-	-	-	-
5	Afghanistan, Badakhshan, 42 km (26 mi) SSE of Jurm	6.6	187.1	IV	Two people killed in Kabul and another in Shahr-e Bozorg. Five people injured in Pakistan.	3	5
8	West Chile Rise	6.2	10.0	-	-	-	-
9	Vanuatu, Torba offshore, 86 km (53 mi) NNW of Sola	6.5	228.4	IV	-	-	-
11	Indonesia, Papua, 139 km (86 mi) SSW of Abepura	6.2	20.0	IX	-	-	-
11	Japan, Hokkaido offshore, 38 km (24 mi) E of Kushiro	6.1	41.8	VI	-	-	-
13	Turkey, Bolu, 2 km (1.2 mi) ESE of Bolu	4.1	5.0	VI	Four people injured after jumping from buildings in Bolu.	-	4
14	Tonga, Vavaʻu offshore, 107 km (66 mi) NW of Neiafu	6.0	143.5	-	-	-	-
14	Russia, Kamchatka offshore, 112 km (70 mi) S of Ust’-Kamchatsk Staryy	6.2	51.3	III	-	-	-
14	Norway, Svalbard and Jan Mayen offshore, 38 km (24 mi) ENE of Olonkinbyen	6.0	12.2	I	-	-	-
15	Vanuatu, Torba offshore, 41 km (25 mi) ENE of Isangel	6.3	10.0	VII	-	-	-
16	South of Tonga	6.0	10.0	-	-	-	-
16	Indonesia, Bengkulu offshore, 144 km (89 mi) SSW of Pagar Alam	6.0	44.5	IV	-	-	-
22	Vanuatu, Shefa offshore, 48 km (30 mi) WNW of Port Vila	6.0	10.0	VII	-	-	-
23	Papua New Guinea, Manus offshore, 153 km (95 mi) SSW of Lorengau	6.0	35.0	-	-	-	-
23	Indonesia, East Nusa Tenggara offshore, 105 km (65 mi) WNW of Naisano Dua	6.7	65.8	VI	Some buildings damaged in Kupang.	-	-
24	Tonga, ʻEua offshore, 64 km (40 mi) SSE of ʻOhonua	6.1	8.0	-	-	-	-
27	Vanuatu, Shefa offshore, 59 km (37 mi) W of Port Vila	6.0	10.0	VI	-	-	-
29	Costa Rica, Guanacaste offshore, 49 km (30 mi) SW of La Cruz	6.2	10.0	VII	-	-	-

=== May ===
May
- Strongest: M_{w} 6.6 Chile
- Deadliest: M_{w} 6.3 (Iran) Iran; 54 deaths
- Total fatalities: 57

Number by magnitude
- 9.0+: 0
- 8.0–8.9: 0
- 7.0–7.9: 0
- 6.0–6.9: 7
- 5.0–5.9: 115
- 4.0–4.9: 1,010

Date	Country and location	M_{w}	Depth (km)	MMI	Notes	Casualties	
Date	Country and location	M_{w}	Depth (km)	MMI	Notes	Dead	Injured
1	Taiwan, Hualien, 11 km (6.8 mi) N of Hualien City	5.2	44.6	VII	Two people killed and another injured by a rockslide in Hualien County and a bridge collapsed at Taroko National Park.	2	1
3	Chile, Biobío, 11 km (6.8 mi) N of Cañete	6.6	21.0	IX	Minor damage and power outages in Cañete.	-	-
4	China, Qinghai, 271 km (168 mi) SSW of Laojunmiao	5.5	13.5	VI	More than 3,100 houses damaged and thousands of people left homeless in Delingha.	-	-
7	New Caledonia, Loyalty Islands offshore, 252 km (157 mi) E of Tadine	6.3	14.0	-	Aftershock of the 7.3 event on December 27, 2003.	-	-
8	Iran, Fars, 26 km (16 mi) S of Nūrābād	5.0	66.7	IV	Four buildings destroyed and six others damaged in the Kazerun-Qaemiyeh area.	-	-
8	Pakistan, Balochistan, 13 km (8.1 mi) ESE of Quetta	4.5	10.0	V	One person killed, 30 others injured and minor damage to buildings in Quetta.	1	30
11	Indonesia, North Sumatra offshore, 181 km (112 mi) SW of Sibolga	6.1	21.0	VII	-	-	-
13	Papua New Guinea, New Ireland offshore, 111 km (69 mi) S of Kavieng	6.4	10.0	VI	-	-	-
19	Taiwan, Taitung, 107 km (66 mi) NE of Hengchun	6.2	20.0	IX	-	-	-
28	Iran, Mazandaran, 41 km (25 mi) SSE of Nowshahr	6.3	17.0	VIII	Further information: 2004 Baladeh earthquake	54	400
29	Japan, Chiba offshore, 140 km (87 mi) SE of Katsuura	6.5	16.0	I	-	-	-
30	Russia, Sakhalin, 18 km (11 mi) SSE of Chekhov	4.9	13.7	VI	At least 46 homes damaged in Yuzhno-Sakhalinsk.	-	-

=== June ===
June
- Strongest: M_{w} 6.9 Russia
- Total fatalities: 0

Number by magnitude
- 9.0+: 0
- 8.0–8.9: 0
- 7.0–7.9: 0
- 6.0–6.9: 8
- 5.0–5.9: 80
- 4.0–4.9: 835

Date	Country and location	M_{w}	Depth (km)	MMI	Notes	Casualties	
Date	Country and location	M_{w}	Depth (km)	MMI	Notes	Dead	Injured
2	New Zealand offshore, south of the Kermadec Islands	6.2	43.1	-	-	-	-
9	Western Indian-Antarctic Ridge	6.4	10.0	-	-	-	-
10	Russia, Kamchatka, 24 km (15 mi) ENE of Atlasovo	6.9	188.6	V	-	-	-
15	Chile, Araucanía, 15 km (9.3 mi) S of Carahue	6.1	37.8	VII	Minor damage and power outages in the Carahue-Nueva Imperial-Temuco area.	-	-
25	Indonesia, Maluku offshore, 289 km (180 mi) WSW of Tual	6.1	70.5	II	-	-	-
28	United States, Alaska offshore, 98 km (61 mi) WSW of Craig	6.8	19.9	VI	-	-	-
29	Costa Rica, Guanacaste offshore, 129 km (80 mi) SSW of Masachapa, Nicaragua	6.3	9.0	II	-	-	-
30	Indonesia, North Sulawesi offshore, 58 km (36 mi) S of Tomohon	6.3	90.8	VI	-	-	-

=== July ===
July
- Strongest: M_{w} 7.3 Indonesia
- Deadliest: M_{w} 5.1 (Turkey) Turkey; 18 deaths
- Total fatalities: 24

Number by magnitude
- 9.0+: 0
- 8.0–8.9: 0
- 7.0–7.9: 2
- 6.0–6.9: 9
- 5.0–5.9: 95
- 4.0–4.9: 795

Date	Country and location	M_{w}	Depth (km)	MMI	Notes	Casualties	
Date	Country and location	M_{w}	Depth (km)	MMI	Notes	Dead	Injured
1	New Zealand, Auckland Islands offshore	6.2	10.0	-	-	-	-
1	Turkey, Iğdır, 18 km (11 mi) SSW of Iğdır	5.1	5.0	VII	Further information: 2004 Doğubayazıt earthquake	18	32
8	Russia, Sakhalin offshore, 342 km (213 mi) NE of Kurilsk	6.4	128.5	I	-	-	-
8	Southern East Pacific Rise	6.0	10.0	-	-	-	-
11	China, Tibet Autonomous Region, 213 km (132 mi) NE of Jumla, Nepal	6.2	13.0	IX	Two homes slightly damaged in Lunggar Township.	-	-
11	South Pacific Ocean	6.1	12.0	-	-	-	-
12	Slovenia, Gorizia, 7 km (4.3 mi) NE of Kobarid	5.2	7.7	VII	One person killed and five others injured by a rockslide in Bovec. Some homes destroyed and others damaged at Kobarid.	1	5
14	Afghanistan, Herat, 8 km (5.0 mi) SE of Qarah Bāgh	4.6	10.0	V	At least 150 homes damaged in western Herat Province.	-	-
15	Fiji, Lau offshore, 208 km (129 mi) ENE of Levuka	7.1	565.5	-	-	-	-
16	Pacific-Antarctic Ridge	6.2	10.0	-	-	-	-
18	New Zealand, Bay of Plenty, 20 km (12 mi) WNW of Kawerau	5.6	10.0	VI	Strongest event of an earthquake swarm. One person killed and two homes destroyed by a landslide near Ōpōtiki, another killed by a falling tree and two injured in the Rotorua-Tauranga area. Five houses heavily damaged at Lake Rotomā. Landslides occurred on the highway between Lake Rotoiti and Lake Rotomā.	2	2
18	Afghanistan, Paktia, 33 km (21 mi) SE of Gardez	5.2	10.0	VII	Two people killed, 40 injured and hundreds of homes destroyed in Paktia Province.	2	40
19	Canada, British Columbia offshore, 62 km (39 mi) SW of Vernon	6.4	23.7	VI	-	-	-
22	Japan, Okinawa offshore, 91 km (57 mi) E of Nago	6.1	20.9	VI	-	-	-
25	Indonesia, South Sumatra, 100 km (62 mi) SSE of Jambi City	7.3	582.1	IV	-	-	-
28	Indonesia, West Papua offshore, 117 km (73 mi) WNW of Manokwari	6.5	13.4	IX	-	-	-
30	Turkey, Ağrı, 18 km (11 mi) SSW of Doğubayazıt	4.8	5.0	VII	Aftershock of the 2004 Doğubayazıt earthquake. One person killed, five others injured and some homes damaged in Doğubayazıt.	1	5

=== August ===
August
- Strongest: M_{w} 6.5 Chile
- Deadliest: M_{w} 5.4 China; 4 deaths
- Total fatalities: 6

Number by magnitude
- 9.0+: 0
- 8.0–8.9: 0
- 7.0–7.9: 0
- 6.0–6.9: 4
- 5.0–5.9: 90
- 4.0–4.9: 854

Date	Country and location	M_{w}	Depth (km)	MMI	Notes	Casualties	
Date	Country and location	M_{w}	Depth (km)	MMI	Notes	Dead	Injured
1	Pacific-Antarctic Ridge	6.0	10.0	-	-	-	-
4	Turkey, Mugla offshore, 15 km (9.3 mi) NE of Datça	5.6	10.0	VII	Fifteen people injured in Bodrum.	-	15
8	United States, Alaska offshore, 218 km (135 mi) SE of Nikolski	6.0	8.0	-	-	-	-
10	Afghanistan, Badakhshan, 46 km (29 mi) S of Jurm	6.0	207.0	IV	Two people injured in Mansehra, Pakistan.	-	2
10	China, Yunnan, 16 km (9.9 mi) ESE of Zhaotong	5.4	6.3	VII	Four people killed, 600 others injured, more than 120,000 homeless, 18,556 homes destroyed, 65,601 others and 22 reservoirs damaged in Ludian County.	4	600
11	Turkey, Elazığ, 8 km (5.0 mi) SSW of Sivrice	5.7	7.4	VIII	One person killed, 11 others injured and several homes damaged in the Elazığ-Sivrice area.	1	11
18	Colombia, Cauca, 67 km (42 mi) ESE of Paispamba	5.1	26.5	V	One person killed, two others injured, 30 homes destroyed and 50 others damaged in the epicentral area.	1	2
28	Chile, Maule, 67 km (42 mi) ESE of Teno	6.5	5.0	IX	Power outages occurred in Cauquenes, Curicó, San Javier and Talca.	-	-

=== September ===
September
- Strongest: M_{w} 7.4 Japan
- Deadliest: M_{w} 6.4 Argentina; 1 death M_{w} 5.4 Indonesia; 1 death
- Total fatalities: 2

Number by magnitude
- 9.0+: 0
- 8.0–8.9: 0
- 7.0–7.9: 2
- 6.0–6.9: 13
- 5.0–5.9: 110
- 4.0–4.9: 927

Date	Country and location	M_{w}	Depth (km)	MMI	Notes	Casualties	
Date	Country and location	M_{w}	Depth (km)	MMI	Notes	Dead	Injured
3	Tonga, Niua offshore, 91 km (57 mi) NNE of Hihifo	6.2	10.0	V	-	-	-
5	Japan, Wakayama offshore, 94 km (58 mi) SE of Shingū	7.2	14.0	VI	Foreshock of the 7.4 event nearly five hours later. Four people injured in Kyoto. Tsunami waves measuring 63 cm (2.07 ft) were recorded at Kōzu-shima and 31 cm (1.02 ft) at Kushimoto.	-	4
5	Japan, Wakayama offshore, 118 km (73 mi) ESE of Shingū	7.4	10.0	VI	Forty people injured in Kyoto. Tsunami waves measuring 93 cm (3.05 ft) were recorded at Kōzu-shima and 86 cm (2.82 ft) at Kushimoto.	-	40
5	Japan, Wakayama offshore, 119 km (74 mi) ESE of Shingū	6.5	10.0	-	Aftershock of the 7.4 event 14 seconds prior.	-	-
6	South Georgia and the South Sandwich Islands offshore, South Sandwich Islands region	6.9	10.0	-	-	-	-
6	Japan, Wakayama offshore, 129 km (80 mi) ESE of Shingū	6.6	10.0	V	Aftershock of the 7.4 event on September 5.	-	-
7	Argentina, Catamarca, 12 km (7.5 mi) SSW of San Fernando del Valle de Catamarca	6.4	22.3	IX	One person killed, several others injured and some buildings damaged in San Fernando del Valle de Catamarc.	1	Several
7	China, Gansu, 107 km (66 mi) WNW of Mawu	5.2	10.0	VI	Nineteen people injured, 600 homes destroyed and 3,800 others damaged in the epicentral area.	-	19
8	Japan, Wakayama offshore, 130 km (81 mi) ESE of Shingū	6.1	21.2	I	Aftershock of the 7.4 event on September 5.	-	-
9	Cayman Islands offshore, 170 km (110 mi) S of George Town	6.0	25.2	-	-	-	-
11	South Georgia and the South Sandwich Islands offshore, South Sandwich Islands region	6.1	63.9	-	-	-	-
13	Russia, Sakhalin offshore, 310 km (190 mi) ESE of Kurilsk	6.1	8.0	I	-	-	-
15	Indonesia, Bali offshore, 13 km (8.1 mi) ENE of Nusa Dua	5.4	98.4	V	One person killed and two others injured in Denpasar.	1	2
15	Philippines, Calabarzon offshore, 24 km (15 mi) WNW of Looc	6.0	115.4	IV	Power outages occurred in Central Luzon.	-	-
19	United States, Alaska offshore, 91 km (57 mi) SE of Attu Station	6.2	25.0	IV	-	-	-
21	Russia, Kaliningrad offshore, 3 km (1.9 mi) SSW of Yantarny	4.8	10.0	VI	Three people injured and 17 homes damaged in Kaliningrad. Damage to railroad tracks near Svetlogorsk. Minor damage in Suwalki, Poland. Damage estimated at ₽140 million (US$1.83 million).	-	3
28	United States, California, 3 km (1.9 mi) SSW of Parkfield	6.0	8.1	VIII	Minor damage in Parkfield, San Miguel and Shandon.	-	-
28	South of Africa	6.4	10.0	-	-	-	-

=== October ===
October
- Strongest: M_{w} 7.0 Nicaragua
- Deadliest: M_{w} 6.6 (Japan) Japan; 68 deaths
- Total fatalities: 68

Number by magnitude
- 9.0+: 0
- 8.0–8.9: 0
- 7.0–7.9: 1
- 6.0–6.9: 12
- 5.0–5.9: 110

Date	Country and location	M_{w}	Depth (km)	MMI	Notes	Casualties	
Date	Country and location	M_{w}	Depth (km)	MMI	Notes	Dead	Injured
4	Northern Mariana Islands offshore, 152 km (94 mi) ESE of Saipan	6.0	7.2	IV	-	-	-
6	Japan, Chiba, 4 km (2.5 mi) E of Noda	5.8	64.0	VI	One person injured and two homes damaged in Tokyo.	-	1
6	Indonesia, West Papua offshore, 45 km (28 mi) ENE of Manokwari	6.2	13.4	VI	-	-	-
7	Iran, Golestan, 31 km (19 mi) N of Gorgan	5.6	34.6	VII	Sixty people injured in Golestan province.	-	60
8	Solomon Islands, Makira-Ulawa offshore, 60 km (37 mi) SSE of Kirakira	6.8	36.0	VIII	-	-	-
8	Philippines, Calabarzon offshore, 9 km (5.6 mi) W of Talisay	6.5	105.0	V	Power outages occurred in Manila.	-	-
9	Nicaragua, Managua offshore, 43 km (27 mi) SSW of Masachapa	7.0	35.0	VIII	-	-	-
15	Japan, Okinawa offshore, 31 km (19 mi) WNW of Yonakuni	6.7	94.0	VII	Several people injured and some buildings damaged in Taoyuan County, Taiwan.	-	Several
18	China, Yunnan, 119 km (74 mi) WSW of Dali	4.8	30.2	VI	Twelve people injured and more than 20,000 homes damaged or destroyed in Baoshan County.	-	12
20	Vanuatu, Torba offshore, 102 km (63 mi) W of Sola	6.1	59.8	-	-	-	-
23	Japan, Niigata, 8 km (5.0 mi) SSW of Ojiya	6.6	16.0	XII	Further information: 2004 Chūetsu earthquake	68	4,805
23	Japan, Niigata, 2 km (1.2 mi) NE of Ojiya	6.1	10.5	VII	Aftershocks of the 2004 Chūetsu earthquake.	-	-
23	Japan, Niigata, 2 km (1.2 mi) NNE of Ojiya	6.3	10.0	VIII	Aftershocks of the 2004 Chūetsu earthquake.	-	-
26	South Georgia and the South Sandwich Islands offshore, South Sandwich Islands region	6.0	10.0	-	Foreshock of the 6.4 event two hours later.	-	-
26	South Georgia and the South Sandwich Islands offshore, South Sandwich Islands region	6.4	10.0	-	-	-	-
27	Japan, Niigata, 7 km (4.3 mi) ESE of Ojiya	6.0	14.1	VIII	Aftershock of the 2004 Chūetsu earthquake. Five people injured, one building collapsed and some others damaged, water and gas lines broke in Niigata Prefecture.	-	5
27	Romania, Vrancea, 7 km (4.3 mi) W of Paltin	5.9	95.8	V	Minor damage to several buildings and roads in Bucharest, Braila and in northern Bulgaria.	-	-

=== November ===
November
- Strongest: M_{w} 7.5 Indonesia
- Deadliest: M_{w} 7.5 (Indonesia) Indonesia; 34 deaths
- Total fatalities: 84

Number by magnitude
- 9.0+: 0
- 8.0–8.9: 0
- 7.0–7.9: 5
- 6.0–6.9: 18
- 5.0–5.9: 152
- 4.0–4.9: 1,185

Date	Country and location	M_{w}	Depth (km)	MMI	Notes	Casualties	
Date	Country and location	M_{w}	Depth (km)	MMI	Notes	Dead	Injured
2	Canada, British Columbia offshore, 189 km (117 mi) SW of Port McNeill	6.7	10.0	V	-	-	-
3	Northern Mariana Islands offshore, 142 km (88 mi) ESE of San Jose Village	6.0	10.0	-	-	-	-
3	Japan, Niigata, 8 km (5.0 mi) WSW of Nagaoka	5.3	10.0	VII	Aftershock of the 2004 Chūetsu earthquake. One person injured in Nagaoka.	-	1
5	Papua New Guinea, East Sepik, 36 km (22 mi) SSW of Angoram	6.0	125.7	IV	-	-	-
7	Russia, Sakhalin offshore, 144 km (89 mi) ENE of Dolinsk	6.2	474.0	VI	-	-	-
8	Japan, Niigata, 6 km (3.7 mi) S of Nagaoka	5.5	10.0	VII	Aftershock of the 2004 Chūetsu earthquake. Eight people injured and a landslide occurred in Niigata Prefecture.	-	8
8	Japan, Okinawa offshore, 61 km (38 mi) SW of Yonakuni	6.3	29.0	VII	-	-	-
9	Japan, Niigata, 7 km (4.3 mi) NNE of Ojiya	5.1	10.0	VII	Aftershock of the 2004 Chūetsu earthquake. One person injured in Mitsuke.	-	1
9	Solomon Islands, Makira-Ulawa offshore, 209 km (130 mi) ESE of Kirakira	6.9	13.0	V	-	-	-
11	Japan, Hokkaido offshore, 92 km (57 mi) S of Kushiro	6.1	32.8	V	-	-	-
11	Solomon Islands, Makira-Ulawa offshore, 80 km (50 mi) ESE of Kirakira	6.7	10.0	VII	-	-	-
11	Indonesia, East Nusa Tenggara offshore, 63 km (39 mi) NW of Maubara, East Timor	7.5	10.0	X	Further information: 2004 Alor earthquake	34	400
11	Indonesia, East Nusa Tenggara, 49 km (30 mi) NW of Maubara, East Timor	6.4	10.0	VIII	Aftershock of the 2004 Alor earthquake.	-	-
12	Argentina, Santiago del Estero, 36 km (22 mi) NNW of El Hoyo	6.1	568.7	-	-	-	-
12	Indonesia, East Nusa Tenggara, 70 km (43 mi) NW of Maubara, East Timor	5.4	10.0	-	Aftershock of the 2004 Alor earthquake. Six people killed, 40 injured, and many buildings collapsed in Bukapiting village.	6	40
15	Colombia, Chocó offshore, 32 km (20 mi) SSW of Pizarro	7.2	15.0	VIII	Four people injured, 154 buildings destroyed and 290 others damaged in Bajo Baudó. Seven people injured and 67 homes destroyed or damaged in Buenaventura. One person injured and some buildings damaged in El Cerrito. Some buildings damaged in El Cairo, Jamundi and Restrepo. Some damage and power and telephone services interrupted in Cali. Power outages in Bogotá.	-	10
15	Indonesia, East Nusa Tenggara offshore, 76 km (47 mi) NW of Maubara, East Timor	5.2	10.0	-	Aftershock of the 2004 Alor earthquake. Two people killed in Alor.	2	-
16	Papua New Guinea, East New Britain, 145 km (90 mi) E of Kimbe	6.1	55.7	VIII	-	-	-
15	Indonesia, East Nusa Tenggara, 84 km (52 mi) NW of Maubara, East Timor	4.8	10.0	-	Aftershock of the 2004 Alor earthquake. One person killed by a landslide in Alor.	1	-
17	Fiji region offshore	6.6	622.6	-	-	-	-
20	Costa Rica, Puntarenas, 17 km (11 mi) SSE of Tejar	6.4	16.0	IX	Eight people killed, several others injured, 500 homes destroyed, 526 buildings, many roads and bridges damaged and some landslides in the San Jose area. Water lines broke at Parrita and power outages in Quepos.	8	Several
20	El Salvador, Sonsonate offshore, 34 km (21 mi) SW of Acajutla	6.3	40.6	VII	-	-	-
21	Tonga, Niua offshore, 133 km (83 mi) WNW of Hihifo	6.0	256.1	-	-	-	-
21	Guadeloupe, Basse-Terre offshore, 20 km (12 mi) SSW of Petites Anses	6.3	14.0	VII	Further information: 2004 Les Saintes earthquake	1	13
22	Iran, Lorestan, 22 km (14 mi) SSW of Vasīān	5.0	36.2	VII	Several people injured, some homes and multiple vehicles damaged by rockslides on the road between Khorramabad and Pol-e Dokhtar.	-	Several
22	New Zealand, Southland offshore, 255 km (158 mi) W of Riverton	7.1	10.0	V	Minor damage in Invercargill and in the Southland-Otago area.	-	-
24	Italy, Lombardy, Gardone Riviera	5.1	17.2	VIII	Nine people injured and many buildings damaged in Brescia.	-	9
26	Indonesia, Papua, 29 km (18 mi) SSW of Nabire	7.1	10.0	VIII	Further information: November 2004 Nabire earthquake	32	228
28	Chile, Easter Island region offshore	6.6	10.0	-	-	-	-
28	Indonesia, Papua, 31 km (19 mi) SSW of Nabire	6.2	23.1	IX	Aftershock of the November 2004 Nabire earthquake. Additional damage in Nabire.	-	-
28	Japan, Hokkaido offshore, 51 km (32 mi) SW of Nemuro	7.0	39.0	VIII	At least 24 people injured, damage to roads, buildings and docks, power, natural gas and railway services interrupted in the Betsukai–Kushiro–Nemuro area. Minor damage to docks and buildings at Nemuro. A 10 cm (3.9 in) high tsunami was recorded at Nemuro.	-	24

=== December ===
December
- Strongest: M_{w} 9.1 Indonesia
- Deadliest: M_{w} 9.1 (Indonesia) Indonesia; 227,898 deaths
- Total fatalities: 227,899

Number by magnitude
- 9.0+: 1
- 8.0–8.9: 1
- 7.0–7.9: 1
- 6.0–6.9: 20
- 5.0–5.9: 323
- 4.0–4.9: 1,340

Date	Country and location	M_{w}	Depth (km)	MMI	Notes	Casualties	
Date	Country and location	M_{w}	Depth (km)	MMI	Notes	Dead	Injured
1	Algeria, Boumerdès offshore, 9 km (5.6 mi) NNW of Boumerdès	4.5	10.0	V	Aftershock of the 2003 Boumerdès earthquake. Fifteen people injured, minor damage to some buildings and power outages in Boumerdès.	-	15
1	Indonesia, Papua, 33 km (21 mi) S of Nabire	5.6	10.0	VIII	Aftershock of the November 2004 Nabire earthquake. One person killed in Nabire.	1	-
5	Algeria, Boumerdès offshore, 12 km (7.5 mi) NNW of Boumerdès	4.5	10.0	VI	Aftershock of the 2003 Boumerdès earthquake. At least 46 people injured in Zemmouri.	-	46
6	Japan, Hokkaido offshore, 54 km (34 mi) SSW of Nemuro	6.8	35.0	VIII	Aftershock of the 7.0 event on November 28. Four people injured and power outages in Kushiro.	-	4
6	Fiji, Lau offshore, 279 km (173 mi) E of Levuka	6.1	439.2	-	-	-	-
9	India, Assam, 8 km (5.0 mi) NNW of Hailākāndi	5.4	34.7	VII	Several people slightly injured in Hailākāndi and minor damage in Cachar.	-	Several
13	El Salvador, La Libertad offshore, 12 km (7.5 mi) SSW of La Libertad	6.0	62.3	V	-	-	-
14	Japan, Hokkaido, 23 km (14 mi) NNE of Rumoi	5.8	10.0	VIII	Two people injured in Obira and another in Haboro. Some buildings, roads and water lines damaged in Tomamae.	-	3
14	Cayman Islands offshore, 36 km (22 mi) S of George Town	6.8	10.0	VII	-	-	-
18	Russia, Sakhalin offshore, 204 km (127 mi) S of Severo-Kurilsk	6.2	11.0	II	-	-	-
20	Turkey, Mugla, 19 km (12 mi) WSW of Ula	5.4	5.0	VII	Three people injured, several buildings damaged and rockslides in Marmaris.	-	3
22	Southern East Pacific Rise	6.1	10.0	-	-	-	-
23	New Zealand offshore, Tasman Sea	8.1	10.0	V	Further information: 2004 Tasman Sea earthquake	-	-
26	Indonesia, Aceh offshore, 95 km (59 mi) S of Meulaboh	9.1	30.0	IX	Further information: 2004 Indian Ocean earthquake and tsunami	227,898	125,000
26	India, Andaman and Nicobar Islands offshore, 222 km (138 mi) WNW of Sabang, Indonesia	6.1	30.0	VI	Aftershocks of the 2004 Indian Ocean earthquake.	-	-
26	India, Andaman and Nicobar Islands offshore, 224 km (139 mi) NW of Sabang, Indonesia	6.0	30.0	VII	Aftershocks of the 2004 Indian Ocean earthquake.	-	-
26	Indonesia, Aceh offshore, 124 km (77 mi) W of Banda Aceh	6.1	30.0	-	Aftershocks of the 2004 Indian Ocean earthquake.	-	-
26	India, Andaman and Nicobar Islands offshore, 128 km (80 mi) NW of Sabang, Indonesia	6.0	30.0	VI	Aftershocks of the 2004 Indian Ocean earthquake.	-	-
26	India, Andaman and Nicobar Islands offshore, 284 km (176 mi) WNW of Sabang, Indonesia	7.2	39.2	VI	Aftershocks of the 2004 Indian Ocean earthquake.	-	-
26	India, Andaman and Nicobar Islands offshore, 312 km (194 mi) S of Port Blair	6.6	16.1	VI	Aftershocks of the 2004 Indian Ocean earthquake.	-	-
26	India, Andaman and Nicobar Islands offshore, 194 km (121 mi) N of Bamboo Flat	6.3	26.4	VIII	Aftershocks of the 2004 Indian Ocean earthquake.	-	-
26	India, Andaman and Nicobar Islands offshore, 203 km (126 mi) N of Bamboo Flat	6.2	13.3	IX	Aftershocks of the 2004 Indian Ocean earthquake.	-	-
26	Indonesia, Aceh offshore, 233 km (145 mi) WSW of Meulaboh	6.0	17.8	-	Aftershocks of the 2004 Indian Ocean earthquake.	-	-
26	Indonesia, Aceh offshore, 249 km (155 mi) W of Sinabang	6.1	30.0	-	Aftershocks of the 2004 Indian Ocean earthquake.	-	-
27	Indonesia, Aceh offshore, 78 km (48 mi) WSW of Banda Aceh	6.1	35.0	VI	Aftershocks of the 2004 Indian Ocean earthquake.	-	-
29	India, Andaman and Nicobar Islands offshore, 305 km (190 mi) SSE of Port Blair	6.1	8.0	-	Aftershocks of the 2004 Indian Ocean earthquake.	-	-
29	India, Andaman and Nicobar Islands offshore, 323 km (201 mi) S of Port Blair	6.2	12.0	VI	Aftershocks of the 2004 Indian Ocean earthquake.	-	-
31	India, Andaman and Nicobar Islands offshore, 336 km (209 mi) NW of Sabang, Indonesia	6.1	14.0	-	Aftershocks of the 2004 Indian Ocean earthquake.	-	-
31	India, Andaman and Nicobar Islands offshore, 268 km (167 mi) W of Sabang, Indonesia	6.0	11.0	-	Aftershocks of the 2004 Indian Ocean earthquake.	-	-

== See also ==
- Lists of 21st-century earthquakes
- List of earthquakes 2001–2010
- Lists of earthquakes by year
- Lists of earthquakes
