= 2004 Nabire earthquake =

2004 Nabire earthquake may refer to:

- February 2004 Nabire earthquakes
- November 2004 Nabire earthquake
