= Raba =

Raba may refer to:

== Places ==
- Rába (Danube), a river in Austria and Hungary
- Raba (Vistula), a river in Poland
- Raba, Croatia, a village in Slivno, Dubrovnik-Neretva County
- Raba, Indonesia, a town in Bima Regency, on the eastern part of the island of Sumbawa, province of West Nusa Tenggara, Indonesia

== Ethnic groups ==
- Rába Slovenes, an ethnic group living in the Rába Valley in western Hungary
- Raba (tribe), a Scheduled Tribe of Meghalaya, India

== People ==
- Rabbah bar Nahmani (270–330), known simply as Rabbah, Babylonian rabbi known in the Talmud as an Amora
- Rava (amora) (280–352), rabbi and Talmudic scholar
- Bob Raba (born 1955), American football player
- Ernest A. Raba, American academic administrator
- Juan Pablo Raba (born 1977), Colombian actor

== Other uses ==
- Rába (company), a Hungarian automaker
  - Rába (automobile), a car made from 1912 to 1914
- Rapid-acting beta2-adrenergic agonist, a class of drug primarily used to treat asthma and other pulmonary disorders
- The Redding Area Bus Authority, Shasta County, California

== See also ==
- Rabas, a village in the municipality of Valjevo, Serbia
- Rabba, a town in Karak Governorate, Jordan
