= 2004 Alor earthquake =

Earthquake in Indonesia

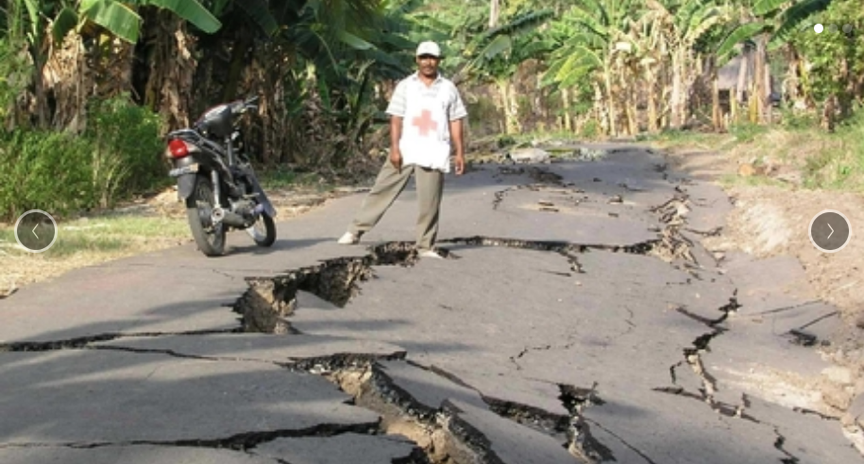
- Damaged road in Alor

- Location within Lesser Sunda Islands Location within Indonesia
- UTC time: 2004-11-11 21:26:41
- ISC event: 7434650
- USGS-ANSS: ComCat
- Local date: November 12, 2004
- Local time: 05:26:41 WITA
- Duration: 40 seconds
- Magnitude: M_{w} 7.5
- Depth: 10.0 km (6.2 mi)
- Epicenter: 8.152°S 124.868°E
- Type: Thrust
- Areas affected: Alor Archipelago, East Nusa Tenggara, Indonesia
- Max. intensity: MMI X (Extreme)
- Aftershocks: 1,011+ (as of 22 November 2004); Strongest: M_{s} 6.4 on 11 November 2004
- Casualties: 34 deaths, 400 injuries, 30 missing

On 12 November 2004, at 05:26:41 WITA (21:26:41 UTC, 11 November), a moment magnitude (M_{w}) 7.5 earthquake struck the Alor Archipelago in East Nusa Tenggara, Indonesia. The island of Alor was devastated by the earthquake, with 17,500 of the 36,300 homes on the island damaged or destroyed. At least 34 fatalities, 400 injuries and 30 missing were recorded on the island.

== Tectonic setting ==
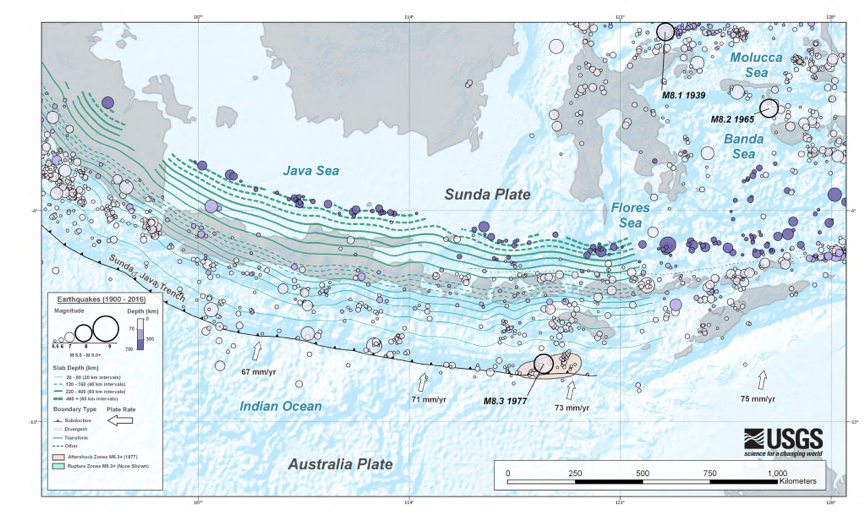
USGS tectonic map of Alor

Alor island is of volcanic origin, forming part of the Banda Arc, which was formed by the subduction of the Australian plate beneath the Eurasian plate. Currently the Banda Arc is involved in the early stages of an Arc-Continent collision, as continental crust of the Australian plate becomes involved in this boundary. Several microplates have been formed, including the Banda Sea plate and the Timor plate. The boundary between these two microplates is a north-dipping subduction zone, movement on which has caused large earthquakes in the past, including the 1991 Kalabahi earthquakes that resulted in 23 fatalities.

== Earthquake ==
The earthquake occurred as a result of shallow thrust faulting on or near the convergent boundary between the Banda Sea plate to the north and the Timor plate to the south. Focal mechanism solutions indicate that rupture occurred on either a steep, near-vertical reverse fault or on a shallow, southward-dipping thrust fault. A rupture area of 95 km (59 mi) x 80 km (50 mi) was estimated, with a maximum slip of 3.9349 m (12.910 ft) north of the hypocenter. The observed source time function gives an almost 40 second duration for the earthquake, with the greatest phase of seismic moment release occurring about 10 seconds after initiation. It had a maximum Modified Mercalli intensity of X (Extreme) near the epicenter, VIII (Severe) in Kalabahi, VI (Strong) in Liquiçá Municipality, East Timor and V (Moderate) in Dili. By 22 November, 1,011 aftershocks were recorded, the strongest measuring M_{s} 6.4.

== Impact ==
At least 34 people were killed, 30 were missing and 400 others were injured in Alor Regency, 118 of them seriously. There were 10 deaths in Northeast Alor, 5 each in North Central Alor and Kalabahi, 3 in North Alor and 1 each in Northwest Alor, Southeast Alor, South Alor and Pantar. At least 17,593 homes were damaged, of which 4,997 collapsed and 4,363 were severely damaged, along with 4.1 km (2.5 mi) of road, 297 schools, 449 places of worship, 419 public offices and eight health centers; the tsunami alone destroyed 22 homes, severely damaged 205 and lightly damaged 649 more. A total of nine sub-districts were affected, with a total population of 36,333 households.

Much of Alor was left without electricity as of 16 November. Two villages were particularly affected in Kalabahi, while nearby Alor Island Airport received significant damage, with the runway cracked. In the Maritaing sub-district, almost all villages reported heavy damage. In Northeast Alor, the location of the epicenter, all buildings collapsed, forcing 8,000 residents to seek shelter elsewhere, while landslides prevented access to the area for several days. A M_{w} 5.4 aftershock on 12 November killed six people, injured 40, and destroyed many buildings in Bukapiting village, a mb 5.2 aftershock on 15 November killed two more people, and a man was killed by a landslide triggered by a mb 4.8 aftershock on 17 November.

== Response and aftermath ==
According to the United Nations Office for the Coordination of Humanitarian Affairs, financial assistance allocated by the local government had amounted to US$172,000. International organizations involved include the International Federation of Red Cross and Red Crescent Societies, Médecins Sans Frontières, World Vision International, Catholic Relief Services, Church World Service, Oxfam, and GTZ-Siskes. Some counties provided financial support, with the United States, China, Australia and Denmark donating a combined total of US$150,400. The International Red Cross also donated more than US$697,400.

Since the earthquake, infrastructure in the region has become much more seismically resistant, mainly homes and schools, now generally being able to resist earthquakes of up to magnitude eight.

== See also ==
- List of earthquakes in 2004
- List of earthquakes in Indonesia
- 1992 Flores earthquake and tsunami
- February 2004 Nabire earthquakes
- November 2004 Nabire earthquake
- 2004 Indian Ocean earthquake and tsunami
- 2026 Flores earthquake
