= 2004 Battagram earthquake =

Earthquake in Pakistan

- Location within Pakistan
- UTC time: 2004-02-14 10:30:22
- ISC event: 7251179
- USGS-ANSS: ComCat
- Local date: 14 February 2004
- Local time: 15:30
- Magnitude: 5.5 M_{w}
- Depth: 11.0 km (6.8 mi)
- Epicenter: 34.774°N 73.216°E
- Areas affected: Pakistan
- Max. intensity: MMI VIII (Severe)
- Landslides: Yes
- Casualties: 24 dead, 63 injured

An earthquake struck Khyber Pakhtunkhwa Province, Pakistan on February 14, 2004. Extensive damage occurred and 24 people lost their lives.

== Tectonic setting ==
Northern Pakistan lies at the southern margin of the broad zone of continental collision between the Eurasian and Indian plates. The rate of convergence between these plates near this location is 38 mm per year. The main structures involved in accommodating this convergence are large thrust faults, such as the Main Central Thrust and the Main Frontal Thrust. Within the frontal thrust zone, there are many individual thrust faults. Many damaging earthquakes have resulted from movement on such thrust faults, such as the 2005 Kashmir earthquake which caused the deaths of around 87,000 people.

== Impact ==
Eleven people were killed and 63 were injured by collapsing houses. Thirteen others were also killed and one was left missing when a landslide hit a minibus and fell into a deep ravine in Battagram. 564 houses were destroyed and 2,262 were damaged in the earthquake.

=== Response ===
The Pakistani government supported affected families by giving 100,000 rupees for a deceased family member and 20,000 rupees for every injured person.

== See also ==
- List of earthquakes in 2004
- List of earthquakes in Pakistan
