= 2004 Doğubayazıt earthquake =

Earthquake in Turkey

- Location within Turkey
- UTC time: 2004-07-01 22:30:09
- ISC event: 7366871
- USGS-ANSS: ComCat
- Local date: 2 July 2004
- Local time: 01:30:09 TRT (UTC+3)
- Magnitude: M_{w} 5.1–5.2
- Depth: 5.0 km (3.1 mi)
- Epicenter: 39.766°N 43.979°E
- Fault: North Anatolian Fault
- Areas affected: Ağrı Province, Turkey
- Max. intensity: MMI VII (Very strong)
- Aftershocks: 80+
- Casualties: 18 fatalities, 32 injuries

On 2 July 2004 at 01:30:09 TRT (22:30:09 UTC, 1 July), a M_{w} 5.1–5.2 earthquake struck Ağrı Province in eastern Turkey, near the border with Iğdır Province. Despite its moderate magnitude, the earthquake killed 18 people and devastated multiple villages near the epicenter, with many poorly-constructed homes collapsing.

== Tectonic setting ==
The easternmost part of Turkey lies within the complex zone of continuing continental collision between the Arabian plate and the Eurasian plate. The overall shortening that affects this area is accommodated partly by thrusting along the Bitlis-Zagros fold and thrust belt and partly by a mixture of sinistral strike-slip on SW-NE trending faults and dextral strike-slip on NW-SE trending faults.

== Earthquake ==
The earthquake had a moment magnitude (M_{w}) of 5.1–5.2. Tremors were felt in Ağrı, Iğdır, Kars, and areas near the Turkey-Iran border. Shaking was also felt in parts of Armenia, including the capital Yerevan. The earthquake's intensity was registered as VII (Very strong) on the Modified Mercalli intensity scale, while the depth was reported as 5 km (3.1 mi).

== Impact and damage ==
The earthquake resulted in 18 deaths, 32 injuries and damage to roughly 1,000 predominantly unreinforced stone buildings, many of which collapsed or were rendered uninhabitable. The earthquake struck during the local mountain pasture season, when many villagers were out of their homes, which prevented a higher number of casualties.

The greatest damage was at Yığınçal village, while Kutlubulak and Sağlıksuyu villages were also severely affected. Post-event surveys showed that most failures resulted from traditional random-rubble walls bound with clay-rich or weak sand–cement mortars, often containing internal cavities that lowered shear strength. Roofs comprised successive layers of compacted earth atop wooden logs—a practice intended to prevent leaks—which greatly increased mass and lateral inertia during shaking. Rotting timber supports further undermined roof stability. Common damage patterns included flexural cracks across wall faces, corner separations of 1–5 cm, and fracturing around window openings. Only a few buildings, erected with better materials and workmanship, withstood the ground motions. Owners were subsequently urged to replace vulnerable dwellings with new construction conforming to Turkish seismic codes.

== Response ==
Various organizations sent relief to the affected areas. Three ministers of the Turkish government visited the area, Greece offered help and France sent messages of solidarity.

== See also ==
- 1976 Çaldıran–Muradiye earthquake
- List of earthquakes in 2004
- List of earthquakes in Turkey
