= 2004 Baladeh earthquake =

Earthquake in Iran

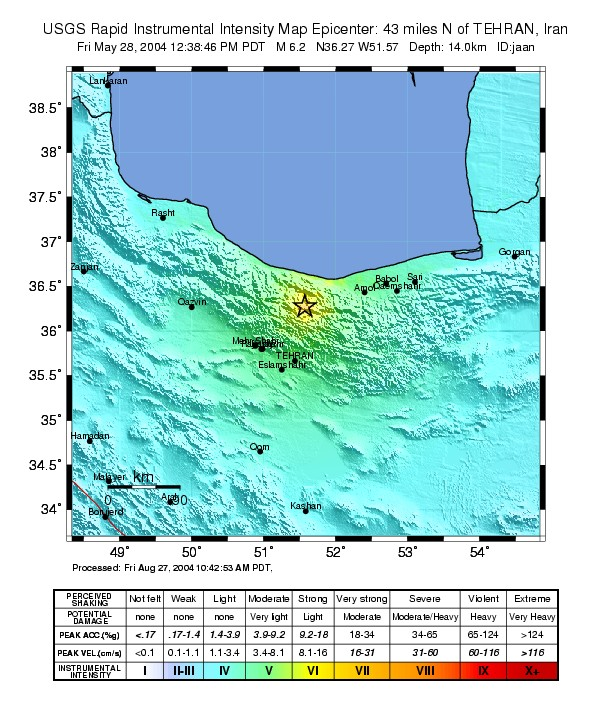
- USGS ShakeMap

- Location within Iran
- UTC time: 2004-05-28 12:38:44
- ISC event: 7349375
- USGS-ANSS: ComCat
- Local date: 28 May 2004
- Local time: 17:08:44 IRDT
- Magnitude: M_{w} 6.3
- Depth: 17 km (11 mi)
- Epicenter: 36.290°N 51.610°E
- Type: Reverse
- Areas affected: Northern and Central Iran
- Total damage: US$165 million
- Max. intensity: MMI VIII (Severe)
- Landslides: Yes
- Aftershocks: 208 total mb 4.7 on 29 May 2025 (strongest)
- Casualties: 54 fatalities, 400 injuries

On 28 May 2004, at 17:08:44 IRDT (12:38 UTC), an earthquake with a magnitude of 6.3 on the moment magnitude scale (M_{w}) struck northern Iran. It resulted in the destruction of thousands of homes and caused damage, power outages and landslides in eight Iranian provinces, with the most severe damage occurring in Mazandaran and Qazvin provinces. At least 54 people were killed, including 28 by multiple landslides and 9 more after a helicopter assessing damage crashed on 29 May.

== Tectonic setting ==
Northern Iran lies across part of the belt of active continental collision between the Arabian plate and the Eurasian plate. Iran is the location of several major faults, with 90% of them being seismically active and subject to many earthquakes each year, with minor tremors occurring almost daily in the country. The most seismically active parts of this area are the Zagros fold and thrust belt and the Alborz mountain range.

== Earthquake ==
Occurring as a result of shallow reverse faulting, the earthquake measured a moment magnitude (M_{wc}) of 6.3, according to the United States Geological Survey, with its epicenter located near Nichkuh, Nowshahr County, Mazandaran province. It registered a maximum intensity of VIII (Severe) on the Modified Mercalli intensity scale. At least 208 aftershocks followed, the largest measuring mb 4.7.

== Impact ==
At least 45 people were directly killed and 400 others were injured by the earthquake, according to the Iranian Red Crescent. Eight provinces and 3,000 villages across northern Iran were affected. At least 5,000 buildings were damaged, of which 3,879 were destroyed. Between 30 and 80% of homes in 133 villages collapsed. Overall, structural damage from the earthquake was estimated at US$165 million. In Mazandaran province, 31 people were killed, 200 were injured and 80 villages reported damage in Nowshahr, Chalus and Nur counties. Landslides buried sections of the Chalus Road in the province, killing 28 people, injuring 70 others and damaging 2,000 vehicles. Four people died and 40 were injured in Qazvin province, where 80 villages recorded significant destruction. Seven villages were also majorly damaged in Taleqan County, Alborz province. In Tehran, windows shattered and many people evacuated buildings. Some roads were damaged and power outages occurred in the city.

== Response and Aftermath ==
The Iranian Red Crescent Society (IRCS) responded almost immediately by dispatching teams, rescue equipment and basic food and non food items. They sent 6,000 tents, 20 rescue teams, 2,000 blankets, eight sniffer dogs, seven medical teams, 44 vehicles and 701 relief workers to the affected area. Hundreds of people in Tehran slept outside in tents following the earthquake.

An army helicopter assessing damage caused by the earthquake crashed on 29 May, killing all nine people on board, including Masoud Emami, the governor of Qazvin province, the deputy governor, the province's police chief and two journalists. The helicopter was one of two dispatched to the region to assess damage and deliver relief. The cause of the crash is unclear.

== See also ==
- List of earthquakes in 2004
- List of earthquakes in Iran
- 2002 Bou'in-Zahra earthquake
- 1990 Manjil–Rudbar earthquake
