= Bombooflat =

Bambooflat Bamboo Flat
- Town
- Location in the Andaman and Nicobar Islands
- Coordinates: 11°42′18.5″N 92°42′54.8″E
- Country: India
- Union Territory: Andaman and Nicobar Islands
- District: South Andaman

Population (2011)
  - Total: 7,962
- Time zone: UTC+5.30 (IST)
- Postal code: 744107
- Climate: Am

Bambooflat, also known as Bamboo Flat is a village in Ferrargunj Tehsil in South Andaman district of the Andaman and Nicobar Islands, a union territory of India. It is located 17 km towards north from Bomboflart District headquarters. 1 km from Ferrargunjyakubo. 13 km from state capital Port Blair. Bambooflat Pin code is 744107 and postal head office is Bambooflat.

== Demographics ==
As of the 2011 Census of India, Bambooflat had a population of 7,962. Males constitute 51.4% of the population and females 48.6%. Bambooflat has an average literacy rate of 88.8%. 17.5% of the population is under 6 years of age.

== Sources ==
- World Gazetteer: Bombūflat (coordinates and population)
- Bambooflat Town Population Census 2011 - 2023
