= Chondros =

Chondros Χόνδρος
- Community
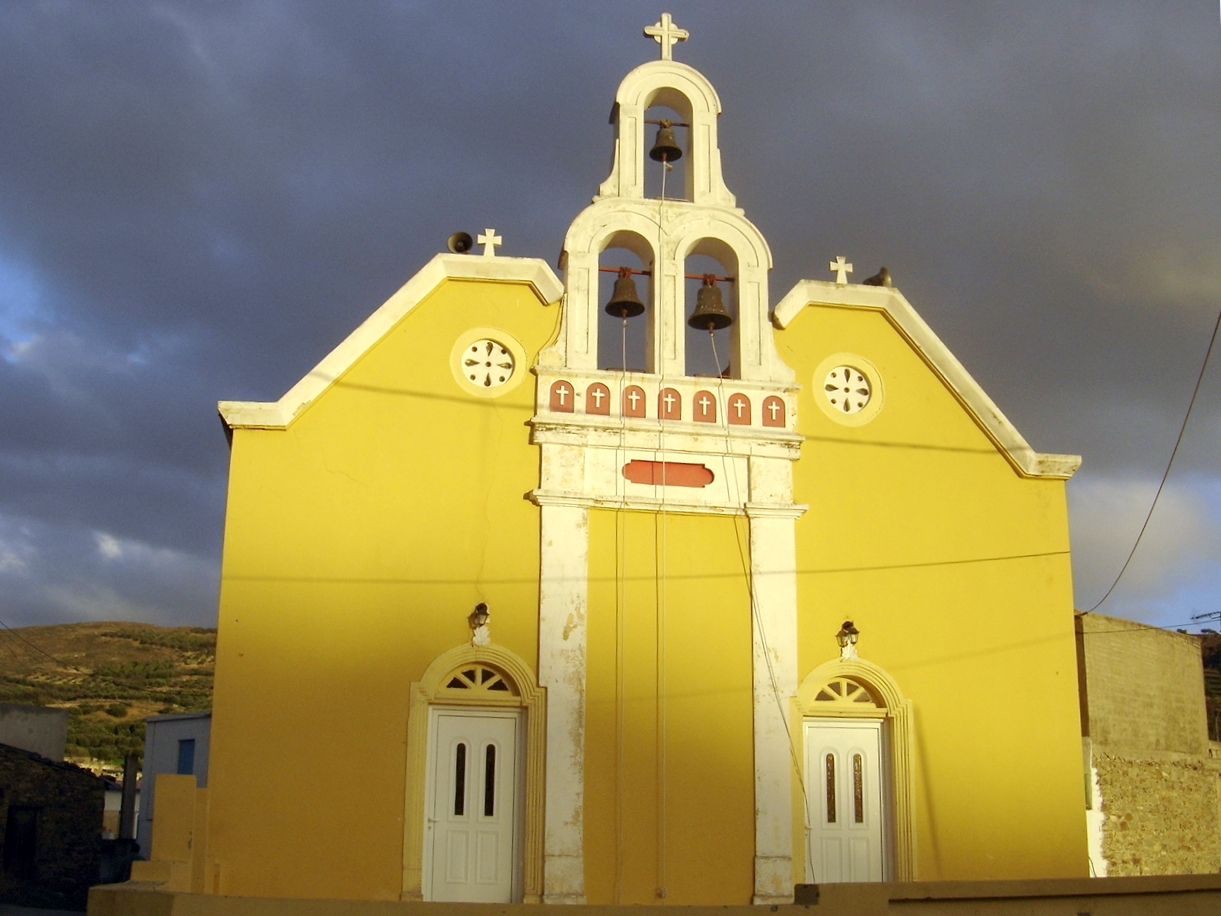
- A church in Pervola

- Location within Greece
- Coordinates: 35°01′48″N 25°22′44″E
- Country: Greece
- Administrative region: Crete
- Regional unit: Heraklion
- Municipality: Viannos

Population (2021)
  - Community: 443
- Time zone: UTC+2 (EET)
  - Summer (DST): UTC+3 (EEST)

Chondros (Greek: Χόνδρος) is a village and a community in the Heraklion regional unit of the island of Crete, Greece. It is part of the municipality Viannos. The community consists of the villages Chondros, Agios Ioannis, Dermatos, Kastri and Pervola.
