= Raba, Indonesia =

Raba Kota Raba
- City
- Motto: Nggahi Rawi Pahu (English:Shame and Fear)
- Location of Raba in West Nusa Tenggara

- Location in Indonesia
- Coordinates: 08°27′41″S 118°44′49″E
- Country: Indonesia
- Province: West Nusa Tenggara
- Regency: Bima Regency
- Established: April 10, 2002
- Time zone: UTC+7
- License plate: EA
- Website: www.dompukab.go.id

Raba (Indonesia: Kota Raba) is a town in the Bima Regency, on the eastern part of the island of Sumbawa, in central Indonesia's province West Nusa Tenggara. Though not the capital (Bima is), it is the largest city on the island of Sumbawa, with a population of approximately 440,000 in 2010. It is connected by provincial road to Bima and Sape.

== Geography ==
The city is located on the eastern part of the Sumbawa island.

== Administration ==
The city is divided into districts.
