= November 2004 Nabire earthquake =

Earthquake in Indonesia

- Location within Western New Guinea Location within Indonesia
- UTC time: 2004-11-26 02:25:03
- ISC event: 7441772
- USGS-ANSS: ComCat
- Local date: 26 November 2004
- Local time: 11:25:03 WIT (UTC+9)
- Magnitude: M_{w} 7.1
- Depth: 24 km (15 mi)
- Epicenter: 3.68°S 135.41°E
- Type: Strike-slip
- Areas affected: Nabire Regency, Papua Province (now Central Papua), Indonesia
- Total damage: US$55 million
- Max. intensity: MMI VIII (Severe)
- Aftershocks: 1,489+ (from 26 November-1 December 2004)
- Casualties: 32 fatalities, 228 injuries

The 2004 Nabire earthquake occurred on November 26 in Nabire Regency, Central Papua (then Papua), Indonesia. The strike-slip event had a moment magnitude of 7.1 and a maximum Mercalli intensity of VIII (Severe). There were 32 deaths and 228 injuries reported from this event.

== Damage ==
At least 32 people were killed and 228 were injured by the earthquake, with 1,649 homes destroyed or badly damaged, along with 110 km of road, 44 places of worship, 49 schools, 33 government buildings, 2 dams, 33 bridges and 2 markets. Communications were hampered in Nabire, and the town's airport and seaport were damaged.

== See also ==
- List of earthquakes in 2004
- List of earthquakes in Indonesia
- February 2004 Nabire earthquakes
