= February 2004 Nabire earthquakes =

Earthquakes affecting Central Papua, Indonesia

- Location within Western New Guinea Location within Indonesia
- UTC time: 2004-02-05 21:05:02; 2004-02-07 02:42:35
- ISC event: 7248018; 7248533
- USGS-ANSS: ComCat; ComCat
- Local date: 6 February 2004; 7 February 2004
- Local time: 06:05:02 WIT (UTC+9); 11:42:35 WIT (UTC+9)
- Magnitude: M_{w} 7.0; M_{w} 7.3
- Depth: 23 km (14 mi) 15 km (9 mi)
- Epicenter: 3.643°S 135.524°E; 4.003°S 135.023°E
- Type: Oblique-normal, Strike-slip
- Areas affected: Nabire Regency, Papua Province (now Central Papua), Indonesia
- Max. intensity: MMI X (Extreme)
- Aftershocks: 91+ (as of 25 November 2004); M_{w} 6.7 on 8 February 2004 (strongest)
- Casualties: 37 fatalities, 682 injuries

On 6 February 2004, at 06:05:02 WIT (21:05 UTC on 5 February), a M_{w} 7.0 earthquake struck Nabire Regency, then located in Papua Province, Indonesia. It served as a foreshock to a larger event the following day, measuring M_{w} 7.3. At least 37 people were killed and were 682 injured, and over 2,700 buildings were damaged or destroyed.

== Tectonic setting ==
Eastern Indonesia and Papua New Guinea are broadly characterized by complex tectonics in which motions of numerous small microplates are accommodating large-scale convergence between the Australian, Pacific, Philippine Sea, and Sunda plates. The interactions of these microplates causes a variety of faulting mechanisms and numerous earthquakes. Another example of an earthquake in this region was the 1979 Yapen earthquake.

== Earthquakes ==
According to the United States Geological Survey, the 6 February earthquake was the result of shallow oblique-normal faulting on or near a transform fault. A focal mechanism of the event indicates it occurred on either a near-vertical right-lateral strike-slip fault trending southeast–northwest, or on a shallower left-lateral fault striking towards the northeast, parallel to the regional plate boundary. The 7 February earthquake was the result of shallow strike-slip faulting in approximately the same fault area. Rupture during the second earthquake occurred on either a left-lateral east–west oriented fault or a right-lateral fault trending north–south.

The earthquakes struck along the transform fault boundary which separates the Birds Head and the Maoke plates. The east-northeast trending boundary accommodates approximately 80 mm (3.1 in)/yr of left-lateral motion. While the February 7 earthquake slightly oblique to this orientation, the east–west plane of its focal mechanism is more consistent with motion along this plate boundary. The 6 February earthquake was felt at Nabire with a maximum Mercalli intensity of VI (Strong), while the 7 February event had a maximum intensity of X (Extreme).

Between 6 February and 25 November 2004, 93 aftershocks exceeding M_{w} 4.0 were caused by the three large events by the end of 2005; The largest event measured M_{w} 6.7 and struck at 17:58 WIB on 8 February.

== Impact ==
The 6 February event resulted in 37 fatalities and 682 injuries. Around 2,700 homes were damaged or destroyed, of which 731 collapsed or were heavily damaged, along with 80 police stations, 30 religious buildings, 20 schools, five markets, one warehouse, a parliament building and the district jail. An official said that many people died due to collapsing homes. In Nabire town, 1,300 homes and the airport runway were damaged and power outages were reported. The walls of many buildings toppled, including those of homes, places of worship, and offices. Telecommunication services were interrupted. Downtown Nabrie was extensively damaged; a hospital, the court building, and many shophouses collapsed. Some residential areas and a local market caught fire. Bridges collapsed, roads cracked, and many trees fell. A leak was discovered at a Pertamina oil refinery. There were no casualties reported from the larger earthquake on 7 February, although it did cause additional damage to structures in Nabire.

== Aftermath ==
The injured were taken to various hospitals, including one who was transported to Surabaya. Two victims died while being treated. The Biak Numfor Regency government said that they were ready to assist the affected people. The first aircraft carrying relief supplies arrived at Nabire airport on 9 February. Some victims were treated at the Nabire Hospital, which sustained damage. Survivors took refuge in tents outside their homes for fear of aftershocks. The Indonesian Red Cross provided assistance to medical professionals in the area. A medical team from Jayapura was expected to arrive on 10 February. The Australian government provided AU $50,000 to the International Federation of the Red Cross for relief supplies such as personal hygiene kits, tents, tarpaulins and blankets. It also said that should the Indonesian government request for assistance, it would provide assistance.

== See also ==
- List of earthquakes in 2004
- List of earthquakes in Indonesia
- 2004 Alor earthquake
- November 2004 Nabire earthquake
