= Lata, Solomon Islands =

Lata
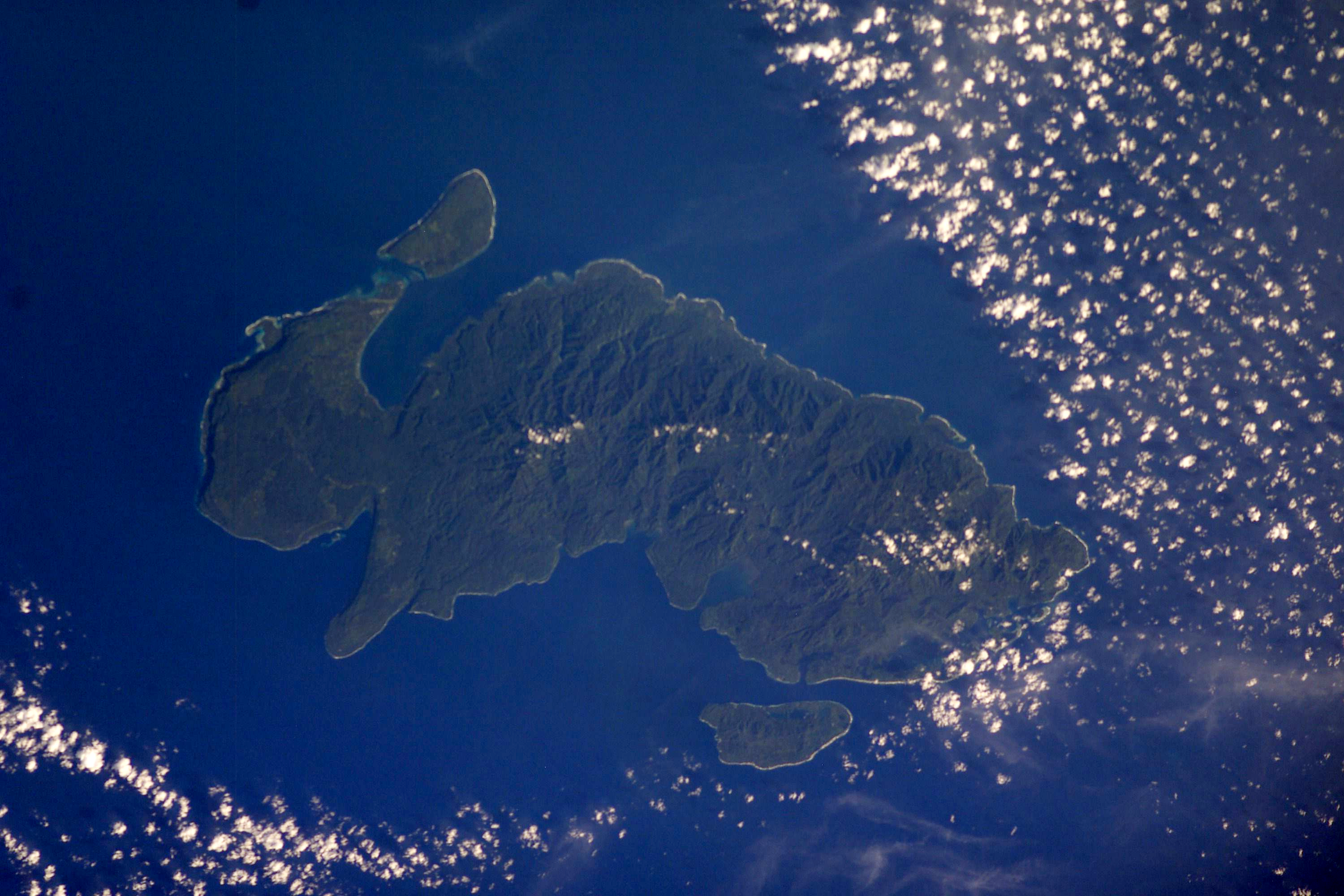

- Location in the Solomon Islands
- Coordinates: 10°43′S 165°50′E
- Country: Solomon Islands
- Province: Temotu
- Island: Nendö Island
- Elevation: 0 m (0 ft)

Population (2019)
  - Total: 1,806
- Time zone: UTC+11 (UTC)
- Climate: Af

Lata is the provincial capital of Temotu Province, Solomon Islands. As of 2019, it had 1,806 inhabitants. There are a few rest houses for overnight stays. There is a post office, telecom office and several stores.

The town contains a small air strip with flights to Makira and Honiara. Shipping service is irregular, but occasionally transport can be found to Honiara or the outer islands. Outboard canoe travel around Nendö or to the Reef Islands is possible.

Temotu Province's main hospital, Lata Hospital, is located in the town.

The only fixed-wing service is by Solomon Airlines. The Regional Assistance Mission to Solomon Islands (RAMSI) used to provide helicopter flights fortnightly to Lata.

The town was relatively unaffected by the ethnic tensions of 2003 due to being far away from the capital, Honiara.

Lata is serviced by one free to air analogue television channel broadcast in the VHF band of 175.25MHz, providing a mix of sport and news content. The channel is provided by Telekom Television, wholly owned by Solomon Telekom, one of two telecommunications providers in the Solomon Islands.

Neighborhoods in Lata:

- Matamotu

== Climate ==
Lata has a tropical rainforest climate (Af) with very heavy rainfall year-round.

Climate data for Lata
Month	Jan	Feb	Mar	Apr	May	Jun	Jul	Aug	Sep	Oct	Nov	Dec	Year
Mean daily maximum °C (°F)	30.7 (87.3)	30.7 (87.3)	30.5 (86.9)	30.6 (87.1)	30.1 (86.2)	29.9 (85.8)	29.0 (84.2)	29.0 (84.2)	29.3 (84.7)	29.9 (85.8)	30.5 (86.9)	30.8 (87.4)	30.1 (86.2)
Daily mean °C (°F)	27.3 (81.1)	27.3 (81.1)	27.2 (81.0)	27.3 (81.1)	27.0 (80.6)	26.9 (80.4)	26.3 (79.3)	26.2 (79.2)	26.4 (79.5)	26.7 (80.1)	27.2 (81.0)	27.3 (81.1)	26.9 (80.5)
Mean daily minimum °C (°F)	24.0 (75.2)	24.0 (75.2)	24.0 (75.2)	24.0 (75.2)	23.9 (75.0)	23.9 (75.0)	23.7 (74.7)	23.4 (74.1)	23.6 (74.5)	23.6 (74.5)	23.9 (75.0)	23.9 (75.0)	23.8 (74.9)
Average precipitation mm (inches)	436 (17.2)	372 (14.6)	461 (18.1)	305 (12.0)	363 (14.3)	296 (11.7)	363 (14.3)	366 (14.4)	355 (14.0)	363 (14.3)	347 (13.7)	335 (13.2)	4,362 (171.8)
Source: Climate-Data.org
