= Karonga (disambiguation) =

Karonga, a township in the Karonga District in the Northern Region of Malawi.

Karonga may also refer to:

- Karonga District, a district in the Northern Region of Malawi
- Karonga Airport, airport serving Karonga
- Karonga War, a number of armed clashes between 1887 and 1889 in and around Karonga

== Electoral Constituencies of the Parliament of Malawi ==
- Karonga Central (Malawi Parliament constituency)
- Karonga North (Malawi Parliament constituency)
- Karonga North West (Malawi Parliament constituency)
- Karonga Nyungwe (Malawi Parliament constituency)
- Karonga South (Malawi Parliament constituency)

== See also ==
- Karongasaurus, a genus of dinosaurs
