= List of earthquakes in 2009 =

Earthquakes in 2009
Approximate epicenters of notable earthquakes in 2009
- 4.0–5.9 magnitude
- 6.0–6.9 magnitude
- 7.0–7.9 magnitude
- 8.0+ magnitude
- Strongest: 8.1 M_{w} Samoa
- Deadliest: 7.6 M_{w} (Indonesia) Indonesia; 1,115 deaths
- Total fatalities: 1,853

Number by magnitude
- 9.0+: 0

Earthquakes in 2009 resulted in 1,853 fatalities. The 2009 Sumatra earthquakes caused an estimated 1,117 deaths, while other majors events struck Italy and Costa Rica. Also notable, the 2009 Samoa earthquake and tsunami was the largest earthquake to occur in 2009 as a magnitude 8.1. The tsunami associated with the Samoa earthquake caused tsunami advisories and warning across the Pacific coastlines of numerous nations.

== Compared to other years ==
Number of earthquakes worldwide for 1999–2009 []
Magnitude	1999	2000	2001	2002	2003	2004	2005	2006	2007	2008	2009
8.0–9.9	0	1	1	0	1	2	1	2	4	1	1
7.0–7.9	18	15	14	13	14	14	10	9	14	12	16
6.0–6.9	117	145	122	126	139	141	139	142	178	167	143
5.0–5.9	1,057	1,334	1,212	1,170	1,212	1,511	1,694	1,726	2,090	1,786	1,912
4.0–4.9	7,004	7,968	7,969	8,479	8,455	10,880	13,893	12,843	12,081	12,294	6,817
Total	8,296	9,462	9,319	9,788	9,823	12,551	15,738	14,723	14,367	14,261	8,891

== Overall ==
=== By death toll ===
Rank	Death toll	Magnitude	Location	MMI	Depth (km)	Date
1	1,115	7.6	Indonesia, Sumatra	VIII (Severe)	90.0	September 30
2	308	6.3	Italy, L'Aquila	X (Extreme)	9.46	April 6
3	192	8.1	Samoa	VII (Very strong)	15.0	September 29
4	98	6.1	Costa Rica, Alajuela	VII (Very strong)	4.5	January 8
5	81	7.0	Indonesia, Java	VII (Very strong)	49	September 2
6	22	5.2	Afghanistan, Kabul	V (Moderate)	5.9	April 16
7	11	6.1	Bhutan	VII (Very strong)	14.0	September 21

- Note: At least 10 dead

=== By magnitude ===
Rank	Magnitude	Death toll	Location	Date
1	8.1	192	Samoa	September 29
2	7.8	0	Vanuatu	October 7
2	7.8	0	New Zealand	July 15
4	7.7	5	Papua, Indonesia	January 3
4	7.7	0	Vanuatu	October 7
6	7.6	0	Tonga	March 19
6	7.6	1,117	(Indonesia) Sumatra	September 30
8	7.5	0	(India) Andaman Islands	August 10
9	7.4	0	Papua, Indonesia	January 3
9	7.4	0	Kuril Islands, Russia	January 15
9	7.4	0	Vanuatu	October 7
12	7.3	7	(Guatemala) (Belize) Honduras	May 28
12	7.3	0	Fiji	November 9
14	7.2	2	(Indonesia) Talaud Islands	February 11
15	7.1	0	Izu Islands, Japan	August 9
16	7.0	0	Kermadec Islands, New Zealand	February 18
16	7.0	81	Java, Indonesia	September 2

- Note: At least 7.0 magnitude

== By month ==
=== January ===
January
- Strongest: 7.7 M_{w} Indonesia
- Deadliest: 6.1 M_{w} Costa Rica; 98 deaths
- Total fatalities: 105

Number by magnitude
- 9.0+: 0
- 8.0–8.9: 0
- 7.0–7.9: 3
- 6.0–6.9: 12
- 5.0–5.9: 191
- 4.0–4.9: 784

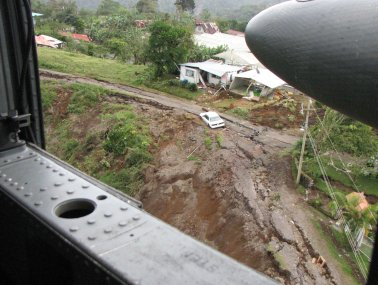
Landslide caused by the earthquake in Costa Rica seen from a helicopter.

Date	Country and location	M_{w}	Depth (km)	MMI	Notes	Casualties	
Date	Country and location	M_{w}	Depth (km)	MMI	Notes	Dead	Injured
3	Indonesia, West Papua offshore, 140 km (87 mi) west northwest of Manokwari	7.7	17.0	VI	The 2009 West Papua earthquakes killed four people, injured 250 others and damaged 840 buildings.	4	250
3	Afghanistan, Badakhshan, 50 km (31 mi) south of Jurm	6.6	204.8	IV	One person killed, five others injured and several homes destroyed in the Mardan-Peshawar area.	1	5
3	Indonesia, West Papua offshore, 140 km (87 mi) west northwest of Manokwari	7.4	23.0	VII	Aftershock of the 2009 West Papua earthquakes.	-	-
4	Greece, Peloponnese offshore, 18 km (11 mi) south southeast of Kardamyli	4.3	10.0	V	One person killed and another injured after a wall collapsed in Messenia.	1	1
7	Indonesia, West Papua offshore, 73 km (45 mi) west northwest of Manokwari	6.0	16.0	IV	Aftershock of the 7.7 and 7.4 events three days prior.	-	-
8	Costa Rica, Alajuela, 10 km (6.2 mi) north northeast of Sabanilla	6.1	14.0	IX	The 2009 Cinchona earthquake left 98 people dead or missing, more than 100 others injured, and 1,087 homes damaged or destroyed.	98	100+
13	Mid-Indian Ridge	6.0	10.0	-	-	-	-
15	New Caledonia, Loyalty Islands offshore, 298 km (185 mi) east southeast of Tadine	6.7	27.0	-	-	-	-
15	Russia, Kuril Islands offshore, 430 km (270 mi) south of Kuril'sk	7.4	36.0	IV	-	-	-
18	New Zealand, Kermadec Islands offshore	6.4	33.0	-	-	-	-
19	southeast of the Loyalty Islands	6.6	12.0	-	-	-	-
19	southeast of the Loyalty Islands	6.0	35.0	-	Aftershocks of the 6.6 event.	-	-
21	southeast of the Loyalty Islands	6.1	24.0	-	Aftershocks of the 6.6 event.	-	-
21	Peru, Junín, 4 km (2.5 mi) north of Llocllapampa	4.6	10.0	V	Fifty homes destroyed and 500 others damaged in the Paccha area.	-	-
22	Papua New Guinea, West New Britain offshore, 102 km (63 mi) northeast of Kimbe	6.1	44.0	V	-	-	-
22	Indonesia, Maluku offshore, 219 km (136 mi) northeast of Lospalos, Timor Leste	6.1	146.7	II	-	-	-
25	China, Xinjiang, 64 km (40 mi) north northeast of Qapqal	5.1	19.0	V	The 2009 Xinjiang earthquake destroyed 218 homes and damaged 2,928 others in the Qapqal-Zhaosu area.	-	-

=== February ===
February
- Strongest: 7.2 M_{w} Indonesia
- Deadliest: 7.2 M_{w} Indonesia; 1 deaths
- Total fatalities: 1

Number by magnitude
- 9.0+: 0
- 8.0–8.9: 0
- 7.0–7.9: 2
- 6.0–6.9: 10
- 5.0–5.9: 171
- 4.0–4.9: 660

Date	Country and location	M_{w}	Depth (km)	MMI	Notes	Casualties	
Date	Country and location	M_{w}	Depth (km)	MMI	Notes	Dead	Injured
3	Peru, Ica offshore, 40 km (25 mi) west northwest of Pisco	6.0	21.0	V	-	-	-
9	Peru, Piura offshore, 117 km (73 mi) south southwest of Sechura	6.0	15.0	V	-	-	-
11	Indonesia, North Maluku offshore, 196 km (122 mi) south southeast of Sarangani, Philippines	7.2	20.0	VI	Due to the 2009 Talaud Islands earthquake, one person died, 264 others were injured, 597 homes were destroyed and 623 others were damaged.	1	264
11	Indonesia, North Maluku offshore, 211 km (131 mi) southeast of Sarangani, Philippines	6.0	35.0	VI	Aftershocks of the 7.2 event.	-	-
11	Indonesia, North Maluku offshore, 192 km (119 mi) south southeast of Sarangani, Philippines	6.0	26.0	V	Aftershocks of the 7.2 event.	-	-
11	Indonesia, North Maluku offshore, 192 km (119 mi) southeast of Sarangani, Philippines	6.0	35.0	VI	Aftershocks of the 7.2 event.	-	-
11	Indonesia, North Maluku offshore, 193 km (120 mi) southeast of Sarangani, Philippines	6.3	27.0	VI	Aftershocks of the 7.2 event.	-	-
15	Peru, Piura, 33 km (21 mi) south southwest of Sechura	6.1	21.0	IV	-	-	-
20	China, Xinjiang, 92 km (57 mi) north northwest of Tumxuk	5.3	17.2	VI	More than 331 homes collapsed and 5,613 others damaged in the Akqi-Kalpin area.	-	-
20	Pakistan, Azad Kashmir, 19 km (12 mi) northwest of Uri, India	5.5	12.0	VI	At least 44 people injured, some buildings damaged and landslides occurred in the epicentral area.	-	44
22	Indonesia, North Maluku offshore, 226 km (140 mi) south southeast of Sarangani, Philippines	6.0	32.0	V	Aftershock of the 7.2 event in February 11.	-	
28	South Georgia and the South Sandwich Islands offshore, South Sandwich Islands region	6.3	15.0	-	-	-	-

=== March ===
March
- Strongest: 7.6 M_{w} Tonga
- Total fatalities: 0

Number by magnitude
- 9.0+: 0
- 8.0–8.9: 0
- 7.0–7.9: 0
- 6.0–6.9: 4
- 5.0–5.9: 162
- 4.0–4.9: 540

Date	Country and location	M_{w}	Depth (km)	MMI	Notes	Casualties	
Date	Country and location	M_{w}	Depth (km)	MMI	Notes	Dead	Injured
6	Australia, Victoria, 1 km (0.62 mi) southeast of Korumburra	4.5	14.0	V	Some buildings damaged and power outages in the epicentral area.	-	-
6	north of Svalbard	6.5	9.0	-	-	-	-
12	Panama, Chiriqui offshore, 259 km (161 mi) south of Punta de Burica	6.3	9.0	III	-	-	-
16	Indonesia, North Maluku offshore, 213 km (132 mi) southeast of Sarangani, Philippines	6.3	35.0	V	Aftershock of the 7.2 event in February 11.	-	-
20	Tonga, ʻEua offshore, 191 km (119 mi) south of ʻOhonua	7.6	31.0	VI	A small tsunami was generated, with heights of up to 27 cm (11 in) recorded in Santa Cruz, Galápagos Islands, Ecuador.	-	-
26	India, Jharkhand, 19 km (12 mi) south southeast of Chaibasa	4.1	10.0	V	Five people injured and some buildings damaged in Chaibasa.	-	5
28	Indonesia, Papua, 127 km (79 mi) west southwest of Abepura	6.0	93.0	V	-	-	-
31	Nicaragua, Jinotega, 13 km (8.1 mi) south southwest of Quilalí	4.4	35.0	III	Three homes destroyed and ten damaged in San Juan del Rio Coco.	-	-

=== April ===
April
- Strongest: 6.9 M_{w} Russia
- Deadliest: 6.3 M_{w} Italy; 308 deaths
- Total fatalities: 330

Number by magnitude
- 9.0+: 0
- 8.0–8.9: 0
- 7.0–7.9: 0
- 6.0–6.9: 11
- 5.0–5.9: 136
- 4.0–4.9: 523

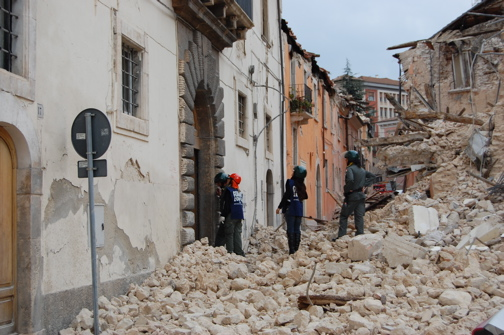
Damage left behind by the earthquake in Italy.

Date	Country and location	M_{w}	Depth (km)	MMI	Notes	Casualties	
Date	Country and location	M_{w}	Depth (km)	MMI	Notes	Dead	Injured
1	Papua New Guinea, East Sepik offshore, 52 km (32 mi) east of Wewak	6.4	10.0	VI	-	-	-
4	Philippines, Davao offshore, 176 km (109 mi) southeast of Pondaguitan	6.3	48.0	V	-	-	-
6	Italy, Abruzzo, 3 km (1.9 mi) southeast of Sassa	6.3	8.8	X	The 2009 L'Aquila earthquake caused catastrophic damage in central Italy, most especially in the L'Aquila area. At least 308 people were killed, over 1,500 were injured and over 3,000 buildings were damaged or destroyed.	308	1,500
7	Russia, Kuril Islands offshore, 299 km (186 mi) east northeast of Kuril'sk	6.9	31.0	IV	-	-	-
7	Italy, Abruzzo, 1 km (0.62 mi) southwest of San Panfilo d'Ocre	5.5	15.1	VI	Aftershock of the 2009 L'Aquila earthquake. One person died of a heart attack in Rome and additional buildings collapsed in the L'Aquila area.	1	-
9	Italy, Abruzzo, 5 km (3.1 mi) southeast of Capitignano	5.4	15.4	VII	Aftershock of the 2009 L'Aquila earthquake. Additional damage to buildings occurred in the L'Aquila area.	-	-
9	India, Rajasthan, 29 km (18 mi) north northwest of Jaisalmer	5.1	44.3	V	Six people injured, 12 homes collapsed and 3,000 others damaged in the Jaisalmer area.	-	-
15	Indonesia, West Sumatra offshore, 155 km (96 mi) southwest of Sungai Penuh	6.3	22.0	VI	-	-	-
16	South Georgia and the South Sandwich Islands offshore, South Sandwich Islands region	6.7	20.0	-	-	-	-
16	Afghanistan, Nangarhar, 39 km (24 mi) east of Ḩukūmatī Azrah	5.2	5.9	VI	The April 2009 Afghanistan earthquake killed 19 people, injured 51 others and destroyed 200 homes in four villages near the epicenter.	19	51
16	Afghanistan, Nangarhar, 38 km (24 mi) east of Ḩukūmatī Azrah	5.1	4.0	VI	The April 2009 Afghanistan earthquake killed 19 people, injured 51 others and destroyed 200 homes in four villages near the epicenter.	19	51
17	Chile, Tarapacá offshore, 77 km (48 mi) north northwest of Iquique	6.1	25.0	V	-	-	-
19	Indonesia, North Maluku offshore, 194 km (121 mi) southeast of Sarangani, Philippines	6.1	25.0	III	Aftershock of the 7.2 event in February 11.	-	-
21	Russia, Kuril Islands offshore, 80 km (50 mi) west northwest of Severo-Kurilsk	6.2	152.0	IV	-	-	-
26	New Zealand, Kermadec Islands offshore	6.1	131.7	-	-	-	-
27	Mexico, Guerrero, 2 km (1.2 mi) west northwest of Pochotillo	5.8	35.0	V	Two people died of heart attacks and four homes destroyed in the Acapulco area.	2	-

=== May ===
May
- Strongest: 7.3 M_{w} Honduras
- Deadliest: 7.3 M_{w} Honduras; 7 deaths
- Total fatalities: 7

Number by magnitude
- 9.0+: 0
- 8.0–8.9: 0
- 7.0–7.9: 1
- 6.0–6.9: 5
- 5.0–5.9: 134
- 4.0–4.9: 463

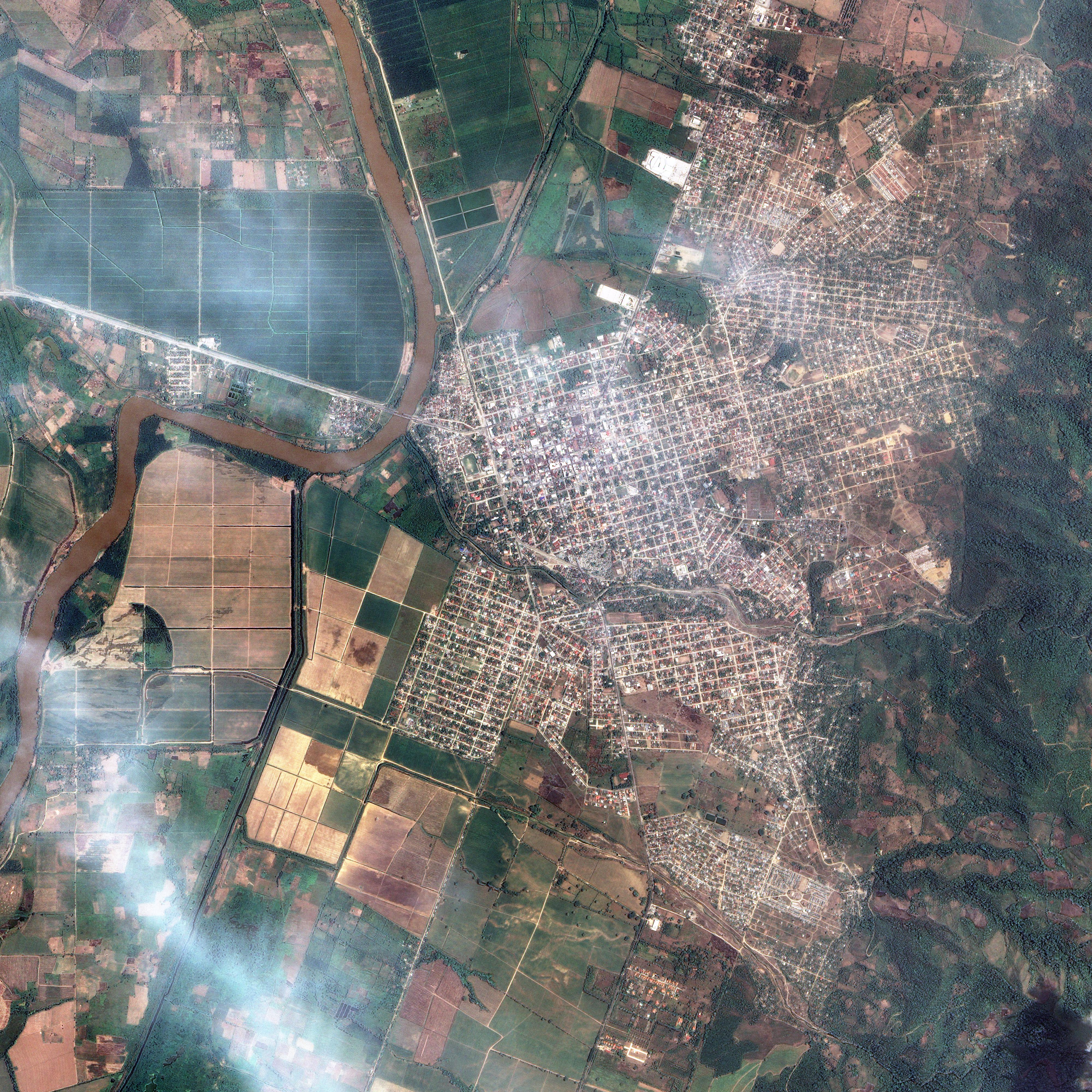
A bridge that collapsed as a result of the earthquake in Honduras

Date	Country and location	M_{w}	Depth (km)	MMI	Notes	Casualties	
Date	Country and location	M_{w}	Depth (km)	MMI	Notes	Dead	Injured
1	United States, California, 10 km (6.2 mi) northwest of Malibu	4.4	13.9	IV	One person injured in Torrance and some damage in the epicentral area.	-	1
3	Guatemala, Suchitepéquez, 5 km (3.1 mi) south of San Lucas Tolimán	6.3	108.0	V	-	-	-
4	El Salvador, Santa Ana, 6 km (3.7 mi) southeast of Atiquizaya	4.7	49.4	V	Ten homes destroyed and 32 others damaged in the Atiquizaya area.	-	-
10	Ecuador, Galápagos offshore, 556 km (345 mi) east northeast of Puerto Baquerizo Moreno	6.1	6.0	-	-	-	-
12	Papua New Guinea, West New Britain, 60 km (37 mi) north of Kandrian	6.1	89.0	V	-	-	-
16	New Zealand, Kermadec Islands offshore	6.5	43.0	III	-	-	-
17	Saudi Arabia, Tabuk, 39 km (24 mi) east northeast of Umluj	4.6	10.0	V	Foreshock of the 5.7 event on May 19. Some homes damaged or destroyed in the Umluj area.	-	-
20	Saudi Arabia, Tabuk, 56 km (35 mi) east northeast of Umluj	5.7	5.0	VII	Seven people injured in the Medina area.	-	7
20	India, Jammu and Kashmir, 12 km (7.5 mi) south of Kishtwar	4.9	20.8	IV	Some homes destroyed and more than 100 others damaged in the Doda area.	-	-
24	New Zealand, Kermadec Islands offshore	6.0	4.0	-	-	-	-
24	North Macedonia, Valandovo, 11 km (6.8 mi) west northwest of Stathmós Mourión, Greece	5.3	0.1	V	Over 594 homes damaged or destroyed in the Valandovo area.	-	-
28	Honduras, Bay Islands offshore, 46 km (29 mi) northwest of Guanaja	7.3	19.0	VII	The 2009 Swan Islands earthquake killed seven people, injured 136 others, destroyed more than 1,300 homes and damaged 9,200 others across Honduras. More than 55 homes destroyed and 199 damaged in Puerto Barrios, Guatemala. Five homes destroyed and more than 20 others damaged in Monkey River, Belize.	7	136
29	Vanuatu, Shefa offshore, 78 km (48 mi) north of Port Vila	5.7	13.0	VI	Ten people injured, many buildings and roads damaged or destroyed, utilities disrupted and landslides occurred in the Tongoa area.	-	10

=== June ===
June
- Strongest: 6.7 M_{w} Papua New Guinea
- Deadliest: 5.4 M_{w} Kazakhstan; 1 death
- Total fatalities: 1

Number by magnitude
- 9.0+: 0
- 8.0–8.9: 0
- 7.0–7.9: 0
- 6.0–6.9: 9
- 5.0–5.9: 133
- 4.0–4.9: 461

Date	Country and location	M_{w}	Depth (km)	MMI	Notes	Casualties	
Date	Country and location	M_{w}	Depth (km)	MMI	Notes	Dead	Injured
2	Vanuatu, Shefa offshore, 38 km (24 mi) west of Port Vila	6.3	15.0	VI	Four people injured, some buildings damaged, utilities disrupted and landslides in the Tongoa area.	-	4
4	South Africa, Prince Edward Islands offshore	6.0	16.0	-	-	-	-
4	Japan, Hokkaido offshore, 105 km (65 mi) east southeast of Shizunai-furukawachō	6.4	29.0	VI	-	-	-
6	northern Mid-Atlantic Ridge	6.0	14.0	-	-	-	-
12	Vanuatu, Shefa offshore, 55 km (34 mi) west northwest of Port Vila	6.0	15.0	III	-	-	-
13	Kazakhstan, Almaty, 12 km (7.5 mi) south southeast of Tekeli	5.4	11.0	VII	One person killed, 18 others injured and more than 250 homes damaged or destroyed in the Tekeli area.	1	18
14	Philippines, Davao offshore, 107 km (66 mi) southeast of Caburan	6.1	35.0	VI	-	-	-
16	Norway, Bouvet Island offshore	6.1	10.0	-	-	-	-
23	Papua New Guinea, East New Britain offshore, 190 km (120 mi) east southeast of Kokopo	6.7	64.0	V	-	-	-

=== July ===
July
- Strongest: 7.8 M_{w} New Zealand
- Deadliest: 5.7 M_{w} China; 1 death
- Total fatalities: 1

Number by magnitude
- 9.0+: 0
- 8.0–8.9: 0
- 7.0–7.9: 1
- 6.0–6.9: 9
- 5.0–5.9: 140
- 4.0–4.9: 627

Date	Country and location	M_{w}	Depth (km)	MMI	Notes	Casualties	
Date	Country and location	M_{w}	Depth (km)	MMI	Notes	Dead	Injured
1	Greece, Crete offshore, 95 km (59 mi) south of Néa Anatolí	6.4	19.0	II	-	-	-
3	Mexico, Sinaloa offshore, 82 km (51 mi) south southwest of Campo Pesquero el Colorado	6.0	10.0	IV	-	-	-
4	Panama, Guna Yala offshore, 4 km (2.5 mi) north northwest of El Porvenir	6.1	38.0	V	Thirty-two people injured and ten buildings damaged in the Panama City area.	-	32
6	United States, Alaska, Rat Islands offshore, 374 km (232 mi) southeast of Attu Station	6.1	22.0	-	-	-	-
6	United States, Alaska, Rat Islands offshore, 374 km (232 mi) southeast of Attu Station	6.1	22.0	-	-	-	-
7	Canada, Nunavut offshore, 338 km (210 mi) north northeast of Pond Inlet	6.1	19.0	-	-	-	-
8	southeast of Easter Island	6.0	12.0	-	-	-	-
9	China, Yunnan, 88 km (55 mi) east of Dali	5.7	7.0	VII	The 2009 Yunnan earthquake killed one person, injured 329, destroyed 10,000 homes and damaged 30,000 others in Yao'an County.	1	329
13	Peru, Puno, 10 km (6.2 mi) south southwest of Tirapata	6.1	198.9	IV	-	-	-
13	Taiwan, Hualien offshore, 61 km (38 mi) east of Hualien City	6.3	17.0	V	-	-	-
15	New Zealand, Southland offshore, 97 km (60 mi) west southwest of Te Anau	7.8	12.0	VI	The 2009 Dusky Sound earthquake damaged buildings, caused power and telephone outages, as well as landslides throughout Southland. The South Island was moved 30 cm (12 in) to the west after the earthquake. A tsunami with a maximum height of 1 m (3 ft 3 in) was observed in Jackson Bay.	-	-
15	Papua New Guinea, New Ireland offshore, 94 km (58 mi) south southwest of Kavieng	6.1	13.4	-	-	-	-

=== August ===
August
- Strongest: 7.5 M_{w} India
- Deadliest: 3.7 M_{w} China; 2 deaths
- Total fatalities: 3

Number by magnitude
- 9.0+: 0
- 8.0–8.9: 0
- 7.0–7.9: 2
- 6.0–6.9: 17
- 5.0–5.9: 138
- 4.0–4.9: 625

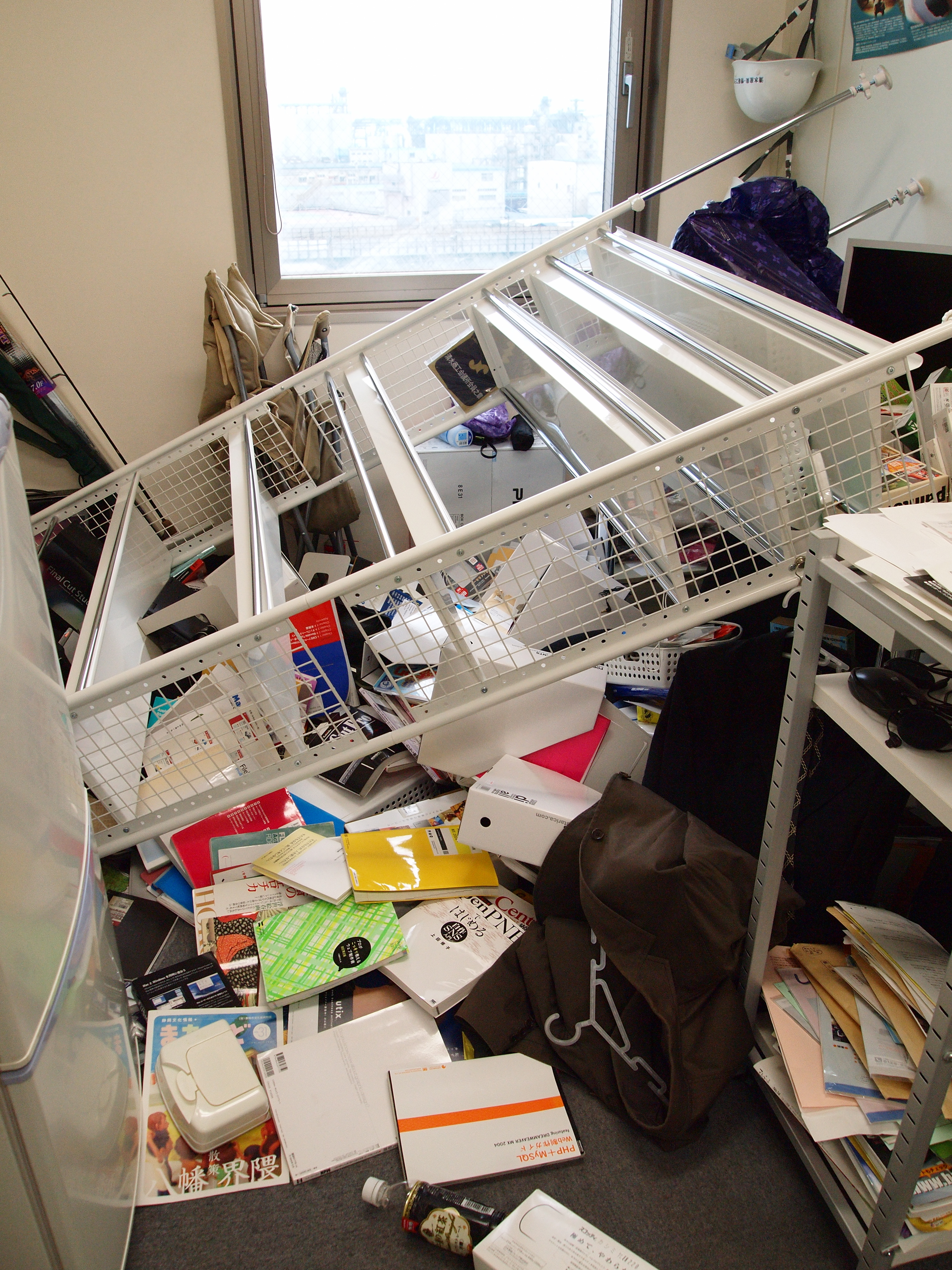
Aftermath of the earthquake in Shizuoka.

Date	Country and location	M_{w}	Depth (km)	MMI	Notes	Casualties	
Date	Country and location	M_{w}	Depth (km)	MMI	Notes	Dead	Injured
1	southern East Pacific Rise	6.1	10.0	-	-	-	-
2	Indonesia, West Papua offshore, 136 km (85 mi) west northwest of Manokwari	6.1	20.0	IV	Aftershock of the 7.7 event on January 4.	-	-
2	Mexico, Baja California offshore, 96 km (60 mi) west northwest of Bahía de Kino	6.9	10.0	IV	-	-	-
2	Mexico, Baja California offshore, 97 km (60 mi) north of San Luis	6.2	10.0	VII	Aftershock of the 6.9 event 41 minutes earlier.	-	-
3	Japan, Okinawa offshore, 66 km (41 mi) south southwest of Hirara	6.1	25.0	III	-	-	-
5	New Zealand, Southland offshore, 107 km (66 mi) west of Te Anau	6.1	10.0	III	Aftershock of the 7.8 event on July 15.	-	-
8	China, Sichuan, 44 km (27 mi) southeast of Neijiang	3.7	10.0	V	Two people killed, another person injured, 173 homes destroyed and 267 others damaged in Rongchang County.	2	1
9	Japan, Shizuoka offshore, 161 km (100 mi) south of Oyama	7.1	292.0	V	-	-	-
9	Solomon Islands, Temotu offshore, 103 km (64 mi) south southeast of Lata	6.6	35.0	-	-	-	-
10	India, Andaman and Nicobar Islands offshore, 266 km (165 mi) north of Bamboo Flat	7.5	24.0	V	The 2009 Andaman Islands earthquake caused minor damage to buildings in Diglipur and Rangat in the Andaman Islands, as well as in Bhubaneswar, Chennai, Cuttack, Rourkela and Vishakhapatnam in mainland India.	-	-
10	Japan, Shizuoka offshore, 8 km (5.0 mi) northeast of Sagara	6.2	40.4	VI	The 2009 Shizuoka earthquake damaged more than 8,678 homes and buildings across Aichi, Nagoya, Shizuoka and Tokyo prefectures. One person was killed and 319 others were injured. A tsunami with a maximum height of 40 cm (16 in) was observed.	1	319
16	Indonesia, West Sumatra offshore, 112 km (70 mi) west southwest of Padang	6.7	20.0	V	Ten people injured, dozens of buildings damaged, and a 36 cm (14 in) tsunami observed in the Padang area.	-	10
17	Japan, Shizuoka offshore, 114 km (71 mi) southwest of Ishigaki	6.7	20.0	III	-	-	-
17	Japan, Shizuoka offshore, 120 km (75 mi) south southwest of Ishigaki	6.1	15.0	-	Aftershock of the 6.7 event 10 hours earlier.	-	-
18	south of the Fiji Islands	6.3	269.8	-	-	-	-
17	Norway, Svalbard and Jan Mayen offshore, 367 km (228 mi) east northeast of Olonkinbyen	6.0	6.0	-	-	-	-
28	Indonesia, East Nusa Tenggara offshore, 211 km (131 mi) northeast of Maumere	6.9	642.4	III	-	-	-
28	China, Qinghai, 294 km (183 mi) southwest of Laojunmiao	6.3	13.0	VII	At least 30 homes collapsed in the Haixi area.	-	-
30	Tonga, Niuas offshore, 154 km (96 mi) east northeast of Hihifo	6.6	11.0	III	-	-	-

=== September ===
September
- Strongest: 8.1 M_{w} Samoa
- Deadliest: 7.6 M_{w} Indonesia; 1,117 deaths
- Total fatalities: 1,402

Number by magnitude
- 9.0+: 0
- 8.0–8.9: 1
- 7.0–7.9: 2
- 6.0–6.9: 12
- 5.0–5.9: 149
- 4.0–4.9: 478

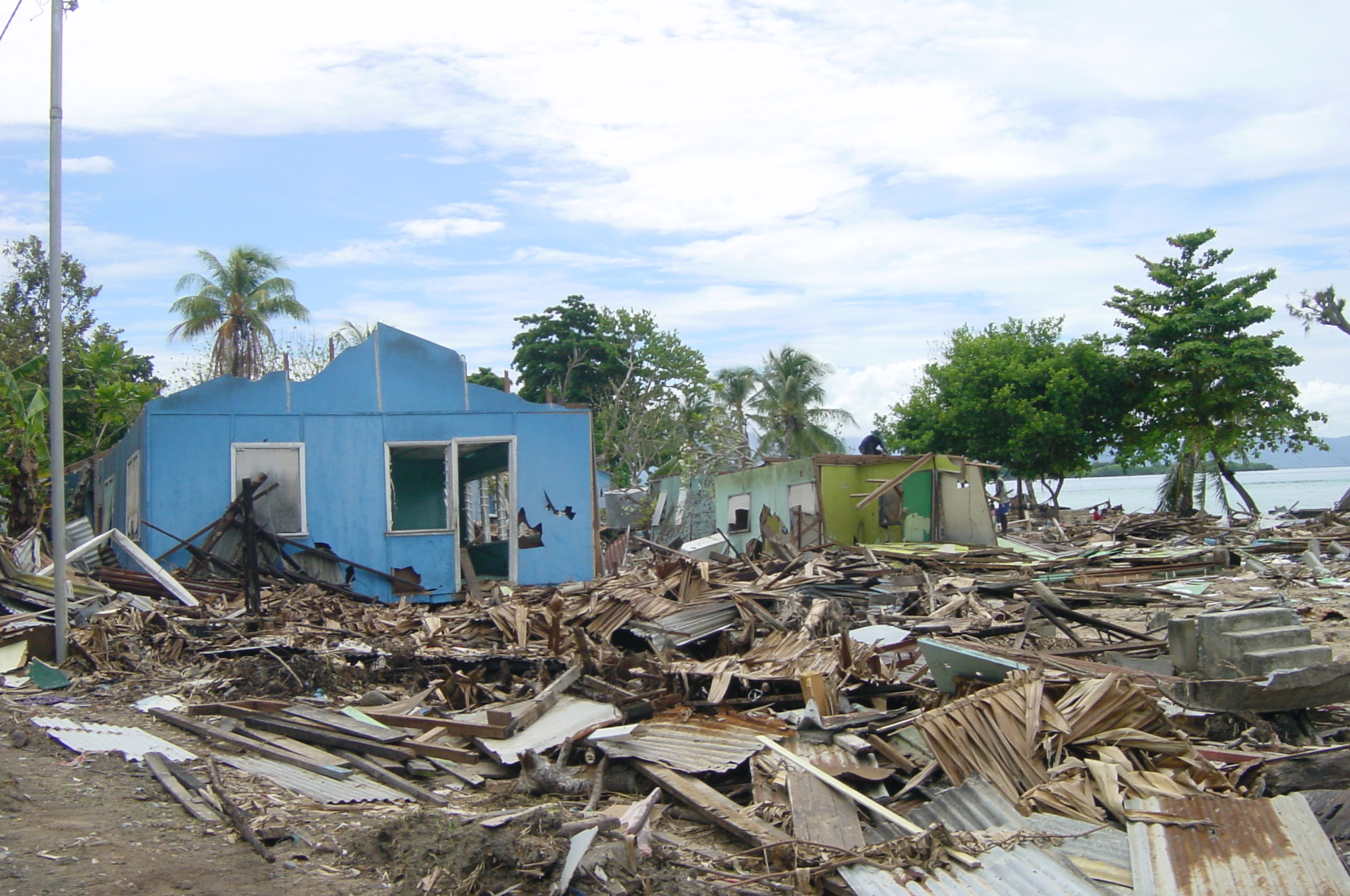
Aftermath of the tsunami in Samoa.

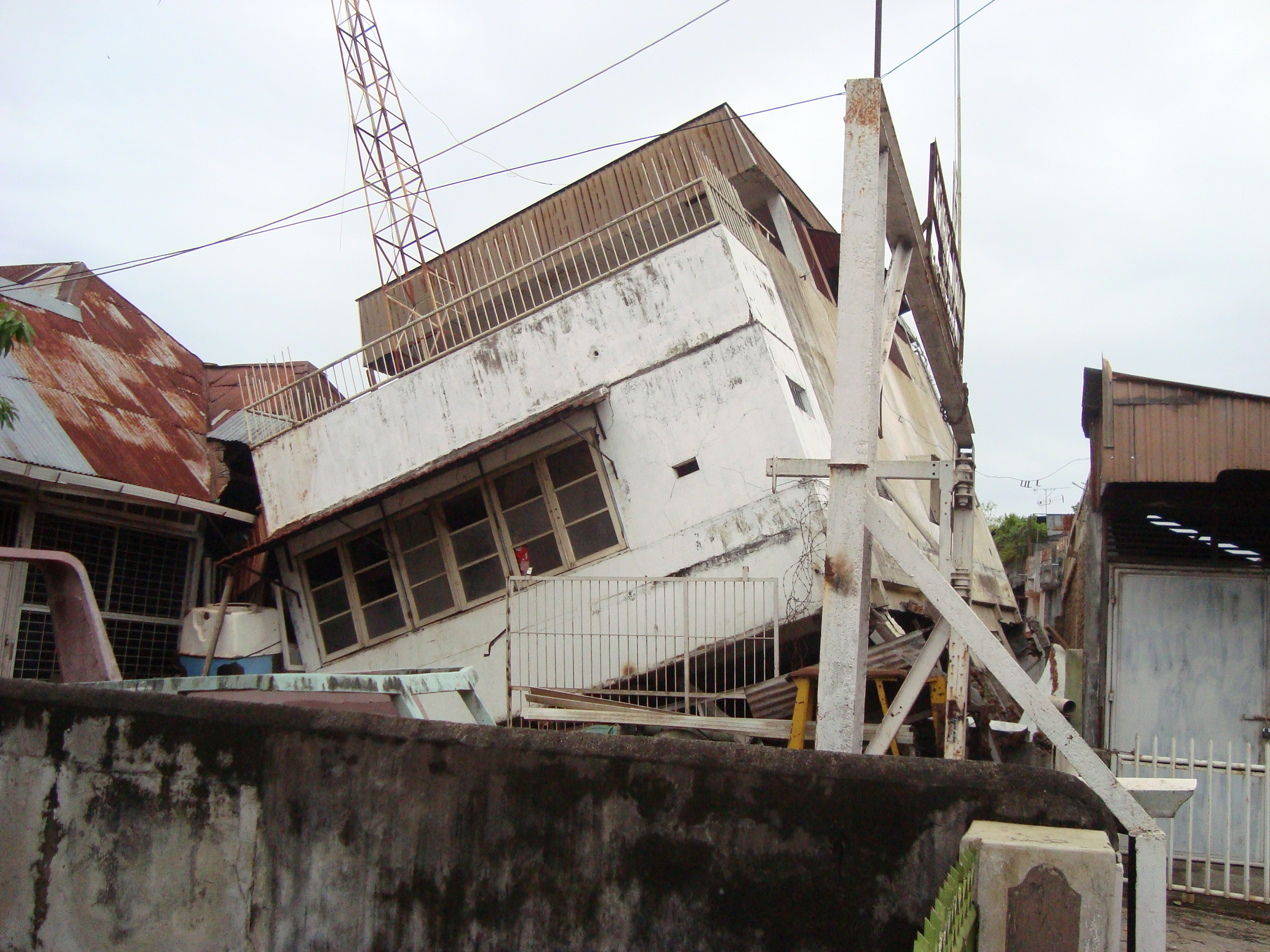
A collapsed building in Padang after the earthquake.

Date	Country and location	M_{w}	Depth (km)	MMI	Notes	Casualties	
Date	Country and location	M_{w}	Depth (km)	MMI	Notes	Dead	Injured
2	Indonesia, West Java offshore, 66 km (41 mi) south southwest of Banjar	7.0	46.0	VII	The 2009 West Java earthquake killed 81 people, left 27 people missing, injured 1,297 others, destroyed 63,717 homes and damaged 131,275 others across West Java. Damage occurred as far away as Jakarta, where 27 people were injured. A tsunami with a height of 1 m (3 ft 3 in) was observed in the Pameungpeuk area.	81	1,297
2	New Zealand, Kermadec Islands offshore	6.2	252.0	-	-	-	-
3	Japan, Kagoshima offshore, 32 km (20 mi) west southwest of Makurazaki	6.2	163.0	IV	-	-	-
6	Albania, Dibër, 12 km (7.5 mi) west southwest of Debar, North Macedonia	5.5	3.0	V	Four people injured, six buildings destroyed and 1,160 others damaged in the Gjoricë-Shupenzë-Dibër area. Many homes and buildings damaged in Debar, North Macedonia.	-	4
7	Indonesia, Central Java offshore, 250 km (160 mi) south of Pundong	6.2	23.0	IV	-	-	-
7	Georgia, Racha-Lechkhumi and Kvemo Svaneti, 8 km (5.0 mi) north of Oni	6.0	15.0	VII	Six people injured and more than 1,500 homes damaged or destroyed in northwestern Georgia, especially in the Oni-Sachkhere area.	-	6
10	Russia, Kuril Islands offshore, 297 km (185 mi) south southwest of Severo Kurilsk	6.0	36.0	III	-	-	-
12	Venezuela, Carabobo offshore, 27 km (17 mi) north northeast of Puerto Cabello	6.4	14.0	VI	Fourteen people injured and 12 buildings damaged in the states of Falcón, Lara and Aragua.	-	14
17	Chile offshore, Easter Island region	6.2	10.0	-	-	-	-
18	Philippines, Soccksargen, 3 km (1.9 mi) northeast of San Miguel	5.7	10.0	VII	Three people seriously injured and more than 76 homes and buildings destroyed in the Norala-Santo Niño area.	-	3
18	Indonesia, Bali offshore, 54 km (34 mi) southeast of Nusa Dua	5.7	79.0	VI	Eight people injured and some buildings damaged in the Badung-Denpasar area.	-	8
21	Bhutan, Mongar, 11 km (6.8 mi) west of Trashigang	6.1	14.0	VI	The 2009 Bhutan earthquake killed 12 people, injured 47 others, and damaged or destroyed 5,167 buildings across eastern Bhutan. More than 265 homes damaged in the Lhozhag-Tsona area, China. Some buildings damaged in Guwahati, India.	12	47
21	Myanmar, Magway, 10 km (6.2 mi) southwest of Yenangyaung	5.7	84.2	IV	At least three buildings damaged in the epicentral area.	-	-
22	Australia, Victoria, 6 km (3.7 mi) east northeast of Hastings	3.1	0.0	V	Some buildings damaged in the Mornington area.	-	-
23	Australia offshore, Macquarie Island region	6.0	10.0	-	-	-	-
24	Mexico, Jalisco offshore, 236 km (147 mi) west southwest of La Cruz de Loreto	6.4	13.0	II	-	-	-
29	Samoa, Gaga'ifomauga offshore, 168 km (104 mi) south southwest of Matavai	8.1	18.0	VI	The 2009 Samoa earthquake and tsunami caused major destruction in American Samoa, Samoa and Tonga mostly due to a 14 m (46 ft) high tsunami hitting the coasts of the three countries. At least 143 people killed, 310 others injured, five others missing, 405 homes destroyed, 161 others damaged and a total of $124 million worth of damages in Samoa. At least 35 people died, hundreds were injured, 241 homes were destroyed, and 3,058 others were damaged in American Samoa. Nine people died, seven others are injured, 79 homes destroyed, 56 others damaged, and $9.5 million in damages occurred in Niuatoputapu, Tonga.	187	417+
29	Tonga, Niuas offshore, 95 km (59 mi) northeast of Hihifo	6.0	10.0	-	Aftershocks of the 8.1 event.	-	-
29	Tonga, Niuas offshore, 134 km (83 mi) east of Hihifo	6.0	10.0	-	Aftershocks of the 8.1 event.	-	-
30	Indonesia, West Sumatra offshore, 30 km (19 mi) west southwest of Pariaman	7.6	81.0	VII	The 2009 Sumatra earthquakes destroyed 135,000 homes and damaged 144,000 others in the Padang-Pariaman-Agam-Padang Pariaman area, with damage totaling $2.3 billion. At least 1,119 people died and 2,912 others sustained injuries. A tsunami with a height of 27 cm (11 in) was observed.	1,119	2,912

=== October ===
October
- Strongest: 7.8 M_{w} Vanuatu
- Deadliest: 6.2 M_{w} Afghanistan; 5 deaths
- Total fatalities: 8

Number by magnitude
- 9.0+: 0
- 8.0–8.9: 0
- 7.0–7.9: 3
- 6.0–6.9: 32
- 5.0–5.9: 239
- 4.0–4.9: 740

Date	Country and location	M_{w}	Depth (km)	MMI	Notes	Casualties		
Date	Country and location	M_{w}	Depth (km)	MMI	Notes	Dead	Injured	
2	Indonesia, Bengkulu, 49 km (30 mi) south southeast of Sungai Penuh	6.6	9.0	IV	Three people killed, 70 others injured, 418 homes destroyed and 908 others and 35 buildings damaged in the Kerinci area.	3	70	
2	Tonga, Niuas offshore, 54 km (34 mi) southeast of Hihifo	6.1	8.0	-	Aftershock of the 8.1 event on September 29.	-	-	
2	Fiji, Western offshore, 319 km (198 mi) west northwest of Lautoka	6.0	10.0	-	-	-	-	
3	Taiwan, Hualien, 41 km (25 mi) south southwest of Hualien City	6.1	28.0	IV	-	-	-	
4	Philippines, Bangsamoro offshore, 71 km (44 mi) west of Gadung	6.6	620.0	II	-	-	-	
7	Philippines, Bangsamoro offshore, 221 km (137 mi) south southeast of Tabiauan	6.8	574.0	-	-	-	-	
7	Vanuatu, Torba offshore, 148 km (92 mi) northwest of Sola	7.7	45.0	VII	The 2009 Vanuatu earthquakes triggered a small Pacific-wide tsunami, with the highest recorded being 62 cm (24 in) in the Port Vila area.	-	-	-
7	Vanuatu, Torba offshore, 196 km (122 mi) northwest of Sola	7.8	35.0	VI	The 2009 Vanuatu earthquakes triggered a small Pacific-wide tsunami, with the highest recorded being 62 cm (24 in) in the Port Vila area.	-	-	-
7	Solomon Islands, Temotu offshore, 186 km (116 mi) south of Lata	6.8	21.0	-	The 2009 Vanuatu earthquakes triggered a small Pacific-wide tsunami, with the highest recorded being 62 cm (24 in) in the Port Vila area.	-	-	
7	Vanuatu, Torba offshore, 143 km (89 mi) northwest of Sola	7.4	31.1	VII	The 2009 Vanuatu earthquakes triggered a small Pacific-wide tsunami, with the highest recorded being 62 cm (24 in) in the Port Vila area.	-	-	-
8	Vanuatu, Torba offshore, 188 km (117 mi) northwest of Sola	6.8	35.0	V	The 2009 Vanuatu earthquakes triggered a small Pacific-wide tsunami, with the highest recorded being 62 cm (24 in) in the Port Vila area.	-	-	-
8	Solomon Islands, Temotu offshore, 183 km (114 mi) south southeast of Lata	6.0	35.0	-	The 2009 Vanuatu earthquakes triggered a small Pacific-wide tsunami, with the highest recorded being 62 cm (24 in) in the Port Vila area.	-	-	-
8	Solomon Islands, Temotu offshore, 59 km (37 mi) south of Lata	6.1	44.7	V	The 2009 Vanuatu earthquakes triggered a small Pacific-wide tsunami, with the highest recorded being 62 cm (24 in) in the Port Vila area.	-	-	-
8	Vanuatu, Torba offshore, 171 km (106 mi) northwest of Sola	6.0	35.0	-	The 2009 Vanuatu earthquakes triggered a small Pacific-wide tsunami, with the highest recorded being 62 cm (24 in) in the Port Vila area.	-	-	-
10	Ecuador, Napo, 3 km (1.9 mi) north of Tena	5.2	35.2	VI	Some buildings damaged in the Tena area.	-	-	
10	Russia, Kuril Islands offshore, 411 km (255 mi) southwest of Severo Kurilsk	6.0	112.0	-	-	-	-	
10	New Caledonia, Loyalty Islands offshore, 249 km (155 mi) east of Tadine	6.0	10.0	-	-	-	-	
12	Mauritius-Réunion region	6.2	10.0	-	-	-	-	
12	Vanuatu, Torba offshore, 198 km (123 mi) northwest of Sola	6.2	42.0	-	-	-	-	
13	United States, Alaska, Fox Islands offshore, 127 km (79 mi) east of Nikolski	6.5	24.0	-	-	-	-	
13	Indonesia, North Maluku offshore, 135 km (84 mi) north of Tobelo	6.0	32.0	III	-	-	-	
13	United States, Alaska, Fox Islands offshore, 123 km (76 mi) east southeast of Nikolski	6.4	14.0	-	This event and the 6.5 quake 15 hours earlier can be considered as a doublet earthquake.	-	-	
14	Tonga, Niuas offshore, 159 km (99 mi) northwest of Hihifo	6.3	10.0	-	-	-	-	
15	Indonesia, Papua, 131 km (81 mi) west northwest of Abepura	6.0	105.7	IV	-	-	-	
15	Galápagos triple junction region	6.0	10.0	-	-	-	-	
16	Indonesia, Banten offshore, 69 km (43 mi) west southwest of Labuan	6.1	38.0	V	Minor damage to buildings in the Sumur area.	-	-	
16	Samoa, Atua offshore, 159 km (99 mi) south southwest of Lotofaga	6.0	18.0	IV	Aftershock of the 8.1 event on September 29.	-	-	
16	Panama, Chiriquí offshore, 147 km (91 mi) south southeast of Punta de Burica	6.0	18.0	II	-	-	-	
22	Afghanistan, Badakhshan, 39 km (24 mi) south southeast of Jurm	6.2	185.9	V	As a result of the October 2009 Afghanistan earthquake, three people died due to landslides and another two due to cardiac arrests in Mirpur, in neighboring Pakistan. Another five were also injured and minor damage occurred in the Dir-Peshawar-Swat area. Power outages occurred in Kabul, Afghanistan.	5	5	
23	Solomon Islands, Temotu offshore, 164 km (102 mi) south of Lata	6.0	31.1	-	-	-	-	
24	Indonesia, Maluku offshore, 268 km (167 mi) west southwest of Tual	6.9	130.0	V	-	-	-	
25	south of the Fiji Islands	6.0	417.9	-	-	-	-	
27	Drake Passage	6.0	10.0	-	-	-	-	
29	Bhutan, Trashigang, 15 km (9.3 mi) west southwest of Trashigang	5.1	26.0	IV	Aftershock of the 2009 Bhutan earthquake. One home destroyed and 116 others damaged in the Lhuentse-Mongar-Pemagatshel-Trashigang area.	-	-	
29	Afghanistan, Badakhshan, 53 km (33 mi) south of Jurm	6.2	210.0	IV	-	-	-	
30	Japan, Kagoshima offshore, 98 km (61 mi) north northeast of Naze	6.8	34.0	VI	-	-	-	

=== November ===
November
- Strongest: 7.3 M_{w} Fiji
- Deadliest: 6.6 M_{w} Indonesia; 2 deaths
- Total fatalities: 2

Number by magnitude
- 9.0+: 0
- 8.0–8.9: 0
- 7.0–7.9: 1
- 6.0–6.9: 13
- 5.0–5.9: 136
- 4.0–4.9: 495

Date	Country and location	M_{w}	Depth (km)	MMI	Notes	Casualties	
Date	Country and location	M_{w}	Depth (km)	MMI	Notes	Dead	Injured
1	China, Yunnan, 74 km (46 mi) northeast of Dali	4.9	24.5	IV	Twenty-eight people injured, 1,000 homes collapsed and 28,000 others damaged in Binchuan and Xiangyun counties.	-	28
2	Tonga, ʻEua offshore, 310 km (190 mi) south of 'Ohonua	6.2	9.0	-	-	-	-
4	Iran, Hormozgan, 18 km (11 mi) north northwest of Bandar Abbas	5.0	14.1	V	About 700 people injured and houses damaged in the Bandar Abbas area.	-	700
5	Taiwan, Nantou, 1 km (0.62 mi) south southwest of Lugu	5.6	18.0	V	One person injured after a ceiling collapsed at a school in Taiping. Some homes damaged, power outages and high-speed rail services suspended in the Nantou area.	-	1
5	Australia offshore, Macquarie Island region	6.0	10.0	-	-	-	-
8	Indonesia, West Nusa Tenggara offshore, 29 km (18 mi) north northwest of Bima	6.6	18.0	V	Two people killed, 88 others injured, 756 homes destroyed and 1,205 others damaged in the Bima area.	2	88
10	India, Andaman and Nicobar Islands offshore, 409 km (254 mi) south southwest of Port Blair	6.0	23.0	-	-	-	-
13	Chile, Tarapacá offshore, 92 km (57 mi) north of Iquique	6.5	27.0	V	Power and telephone outages occurred in Iquique.	-	-
14	India, Maharashtra, 21 km (13 mi) north northwest of Malkapur	4.8	10.0	IV	The walls of 46 homes collapsed and at least 175 others damaged in the epicentral area.	-	-
17	Argentina, Jujuy, 100 km (62 mi) west southwest of Abra Pampa	6.2	220.4	III	-	-	-
17	Canada, British Columbia offshore, 254 km (158 mi) south southwest of Prince Rupert	6.6	17.0	III	-	-	-
22	Fiji, Eastern offshore, 241 km (150 mi) east of Levuka	6.4	522.6	-	-	-	-
22	New Zealand, Kermadec Islands offshore	6.2	435.7	-	-	-	-
24	Tonga, Ha‘apai offshore, 104 km (65 mi) south southeast of Pangai	6.8	18.0	III	-	-	-
26	El Salvador, Sonsonate offshore, 12 km (7.5 mi) southwest of Acajutla	5.9	56.8	V	Damage to buildings in the Soyapango-Santa Ana area.	-	-
27	Venezuela, Lara, 49 km (30 mi) northeast of Carora	5.4	7.0	IV	Some buildings damaged in the Siquisique area.	-	-
28	Indonesia, East Nusa Tenggara offshore, 172 km (107 mi) west southwest of Waingapu	6.0	15.0	III	-	-	-
28	New Zealand, Kermadec Islands offshore	6.0	28.0	-	-	-	-
28	Philippines, Davao offshore, 91 km (57 mi) east of Sarangani	6.1	38.8	III	-	-	-

=== December ===
December
- Strongest: 6.4 M_{w} New Caledonia central Mid-Atlantic Ridge; Taiwan
- Deadliest: 6.0 M_{w} Malawi; 3 deaths
- Total fatalities: 7

Number by magnitude
- 9.0+: 0
- 8.0–8.9: 0
- 7.0–7.9: 0
- 6.0–6.9: 12
- 5.0–5.9: 136
- 4.0–4.9: 478

Date	Country and location	M_{w}	Depth (km)	MMI	Notes	Casualties	
Date	Country and location	M_{w}	Depth (km)	MMI	Notes	Dead	Injured
2	southern East Pacific Rise	6.0	10.0	-	-	-	-
6	Malawi, Northern Region, 22 km (14 mi) south southwest of Karonga	5.8	9.0	VII	Part of the 2009 Karonga earthquakes sequence; six people injured and many homes and buildings damaged in Karonga.	-	6
6	South Africa, Gauteng, 8 km (5.0 mi) north of Fochville	3.5	2.0	V	Two people killed and three others injured in a mine in the Driefontein area.	2	3
8	Malawi, Northern Region, 6 km (3.7 mi) west southwest of Karonga	5.9	8.0	VII	Part of the 2009 Karonga earthquakes sequence; one person killed, 15 others injured and 3,000 homes damaged or destroyed in the Karonga area.	1	15
9	New Caledonia, Loyalty Islands, 325 km (202 mi) east southeast of Tadine	6.4	45.0	III	-	-	-
9	Indonesia, Aceh, 60 km (37 mi) west northwest of Sinabang	6.0	21.0	VI	-	-	-
9	Russia, Kamchatka offshore, 331 km (206 mi) northwest of Ozernovskiy	6.3	656.2	-	-	-	-
12	India, Maharashtra, 29 km (18 mi) northwest of Malkapur	4.8	10.0	VI	The walls of three buildings collapsed and several homes and a school damaged in the Satara area.	-	-
14	Papua New Guinea, Bougainville offshore, 121 km (75 mi) west northwest of Panguna	6.0	39.0	V	-	-	-
17	Japan, Shizuoka, 17 km (11 mi) east southeast of Itō	5.0	6.8	VI	Seven people injured, 278 buildings damaged, water leaks occurred and roads were damaged in the Itō area.	-	7
19	Taiwan, Hualien offshore, 20 km (12 mi) south of Hualien City	6.4	43.0	VI	The 2009 Hualien earthquake killed one person, injured 12 others, damaged buildings and caused power outages across Taiwan.	1	12
19	Malawi, Northern Region, 23 km (14 mi) south southwest of Karonga	6.0	6.0	VII	The mainshock of the 2009 Karonga earthquakes killed three people, injured 250 others, and damaged or destroyed more than 3,900 homes and buildings in the Karonga area.	3	250
23	Indonesia, West Sumatra offshore, 119 km (74 mi) west southwest of Padang	6.0	19.0	VI	-	-	-
24	Russia, Primorski Krai offshore, 98 km (61 mi) southeast of Preobrazheniye	6.3	392.0	-	-	-	-
26	Indonesia, Maluku offshore, 171 km (106 mi) west of Tual	6.1	85.0	III	-	-	-
30	Mexico, Baja California, 12 km (7.5 mi) north of Delta	5.8	6.0	VI	Some buildings damaged, power outages and ground cracks appeared in the Mexicali area.	-	-
31	Pacific-Antarctic Ridge	6.0	10.0	-	-	-	-
31	Bhutan, Trashigang, 4 km (2.5 mi) west southwest of Trashigang	5.5	10.0	VI	Two people injured in Dramitse and 700 homes damaged in the Trashigang area.	-	2

== See also ==
- List of 21st-century earthquakes
