= 2009 Indonesia earthquake =

2009 Indonesia earthquake may refer to:

- 2009 West Papua earthquakes (4 January), very large doublet in West Papua
- 2009 Talaud Islands earthquake (12 February), large earthquake in North Sulawesi
- 2009 West Java earthquake (2 September), by the south-west coast of Java
- 2009 Sumatra earthquakes (30 September), west of Sumatra

== See also ==
- List of earthquakes in Indonesia
