= KGJ =

KGJ or kgj may refer to:

- KGJ, the IATA code for Karonga Airport, Malawi
- kgj, the ISO 639-3 code for Magar Kham language, Nepal
