= James Bond Kamwambi =

Malawian politician (1967–2021)

James Bond Kamwambi (25 November 1967 – 5 February 2021) was a Malawian politician.

== Biography ==
He served as a member of the National Assembly of Malawi for the Democratic Progressive Party, representing Karonga North West from 2014 till his death on 5 February 2021 from COVID-19 in Chitipa during the COVID-19 pandemic in Malawi.
