= 2009 Vanuatu earthquakes =

Triplet earthquake in Vanuatu

- Location within Oceania
- UTC time: 2009-10-07 22:03:14
- 2009-10-07 22:18:51
- 2009-10-07 23:13:48
- USGS-ANSS: ComCat
- ComCat
- ComCat
- Local date: October 8, 2009
- Local time: 09:03
- 09:18
- 10:13
- Magnitude: 7.7 M_{w}
- 7.8 M_{w}
- 7.4 M_{w}
- Depth: 45.0 km (28 mi)
- 35.0 km (22 mi)
- 31.1 km (19.3 mi)
- Epicenter: 12.517°S 166.382°E
- Max. intensity: MMI IX (Violent)
- Tsunami: 62 cm (2.03 ft)
- Aftershocks: Yes, strongest being M_{w} 7.4
- Casualties: None

The 2009 Vanuatu earthquakes were three earthquakes with magnitudes ranging from 7.4 to 7.8, constituting some of the largest earthquakes in Vanuatu's history.

== Tectonic Setting ==
The Vanuatu earthquakes of October 7, 2009: M 7.7, Vanuatu, 22:03:14; M 7.8 Santa Cruz Islands, 22:18:51 UTC; and M 7.4, Vanuatu, 23:13:48; all occurred as a result of shallow reverse faulting on or near the plate boundary interface between the Indo-Australian Plate and Pacific Plates. In the region of these earthquakes, the Indo-Australian Plate moves to the east-northeast with respect to the Pacific Plate at a velocity of about 91 mm/yr. The Indo-Australian Plate thrusts under the Pacific Plate at the New Hebrides Trench and dips to the east-northeast. The locations, depths, and focal mechanism solutions for the October 7th events are all consistent with them resulting from reverse faulting associated with subduction along the Australia-Pacific Plate boundary.

The 7.8 M_{w} earthquake of October 7, 2009 (22:18 UTC), occurred about 60 km north, and 15 minutes after, a slightly smaller earthquake with a 7.7 M_{w} of the same date Occurred (22:03 UTC). A third, smaller event at 7.4 M_{w} occurred at 23:13 UTC, 15 km to the southeast of the first event. All three events are likely related; while the first two similarly sized events may be considered a doublet earthquake, preliminary analysis suggests that the 7.4 M_{w} earthquake is likely a large aftershock of one of the events.

== Earthquake ==
More than a dozen earthquakes above 5.0 magnitude shook the country within two days of the earthquake sequence, The largest earthquake of the sequence, measuring a magnitude of 7.8, M_{w} struck the province of Torba, with an epicentre 294 km (183 mi) northwest of the island of Espiritu Santo, and is the second largest earthquake of 2009. None of these tremors caused any casualties.

=== Aftershocks and other events ===
About 15 minutes prior, a magnitude 7.7 earthquake struck the same area. Due to them occurring in the same region, both events are considered a doublet earthquake. About an hour after that event, a magnitude 7.4 earthquake struck the same area, it is considered an aftershock to one of the events. At least nine aftershocks of magnitude six or higher were recorded by the USGS. Some of the aftershocks, as large as magnitude 6.1, were located in the Solomon Islands. the largest earthquakes of the aftershock sequence were the aforementioned 7.4 event as well as a magnitude 6.8 tremor on October 8. On June 3, 2009, an unrelated magnitude 6.3 earthquake struck 38 km west of the capital of Port-Vila, injuring four, damaging a few buildings and triggering landslides.

== Tsunami ==
A tsunami was observed all over the Pacific Ocean, with waves as high as 62 cm (2.03 ft) in Port-Vila, Vanuatu, 30 cm (0.98 ft) in Santa Monica, California, and 16 cm (0.52 ft) in Atka, Alaska.

== See also ==
- List of earthquakes in Vanuatu
- 1999 Ambrym earthquake
- List of earthquakes in 2009
- 2021 Kermadec Islands earthquakes
- 2021 Loyalty Islands earthquake
