= 2009 Hualien earthquake =

6.4 Mw earthquake in Taiwan

- Location within Taiwan
- UTC time: 2009-12-19 13:02:14
- ISC event: 14196435
- USGS-ANSS: ComCat
- Local date: December 19, 2009
- Local time: 21:02:14
- Magnitude: 6.4 M_{w}
- Depth: 43 km (27 mi)
- Epicenter: 23.76°N 121.69°E
- Type: Oblique-slip
- Areas affected: Taiwan
- Max. intensity: MMI VI (Strong)
- Casualties: 1 dead, 14 injured

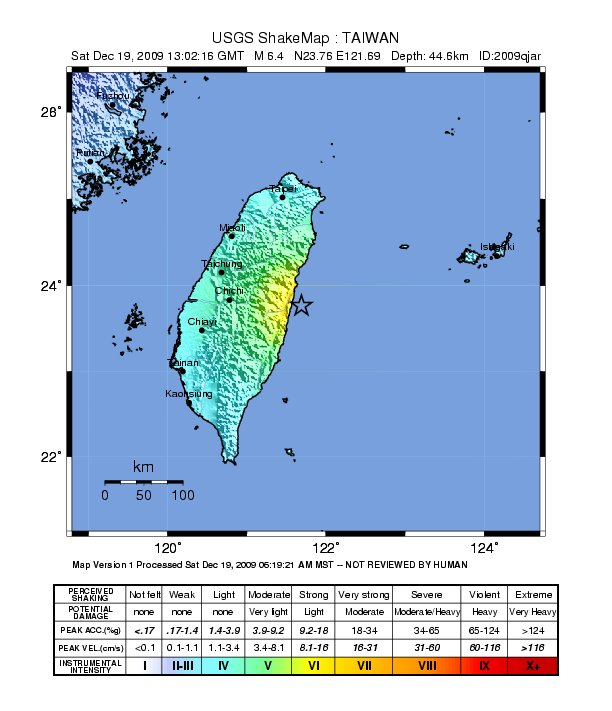
Intensity Map

The 2009 Hualien earthquake occurred on December 19 at 21:02:14 (local time) with a moment magnitude of 6.4 and a maximum Mercalli intensity of VI (Strong). The oblique-slip event took place off the coast of Hualien, Taiwan. Strong shaking could be felt in Hualien City (Shindo 5 according to Central Weather Bureau) and Taipei (Shindo 4 according to Central Weather Bureau). The earthquake could also be felt in Hong Kong and Xiamen, China, and on several islands between Yonaguni and Tarama, Japan.

== Casualties and damage ==
Two cars were damaged by fallen water towers in Taipei. Ten people were hospitalized following a chlorine leak in a hotel in Hualien. The outer decorative wall of a restaurant in Hualien collapsed. A fire broke out at a warehouse in Taoyuan County, killing a man.

== See also ==
- List of earthquakes in 2009
- List of earthquakes in Taiwan
