= 2009 Cinchona earthquake =

Earthquake in northern Costa Rica

- Location within Central America
- UTC time: 2009-01-08 19:21:35
- ISC event: 13962308
- USGS-ANSS: ComCat
- Local date: January 8, 2009
- Local time: 1:21:35 pm
- Magnitude: 6.1 M_{wc}
- Depth: 12.5 km (7.8 mi)
- Epicenter: 10.23°N 84.22°W
- Type: Oblique-slip
- Areas affected: Costa Rica
- Max. intensity: MMI IX (Violent)
- Casualties: 34 dead, 91 injured, 64 missing

The 2009 Cinchona earthquake occurred at 1:21:35 pm local time on January 8 with an M_{wc} magnitude of 6.1 and a maximum Mercalli intensity of IX ( Violent). The shock took place in northern Costa Rica, 30 kilometres (19 mi) north-northwest of San José and was felt throughout Costa Rica and in southern central Nicaragua.

== Damage ==
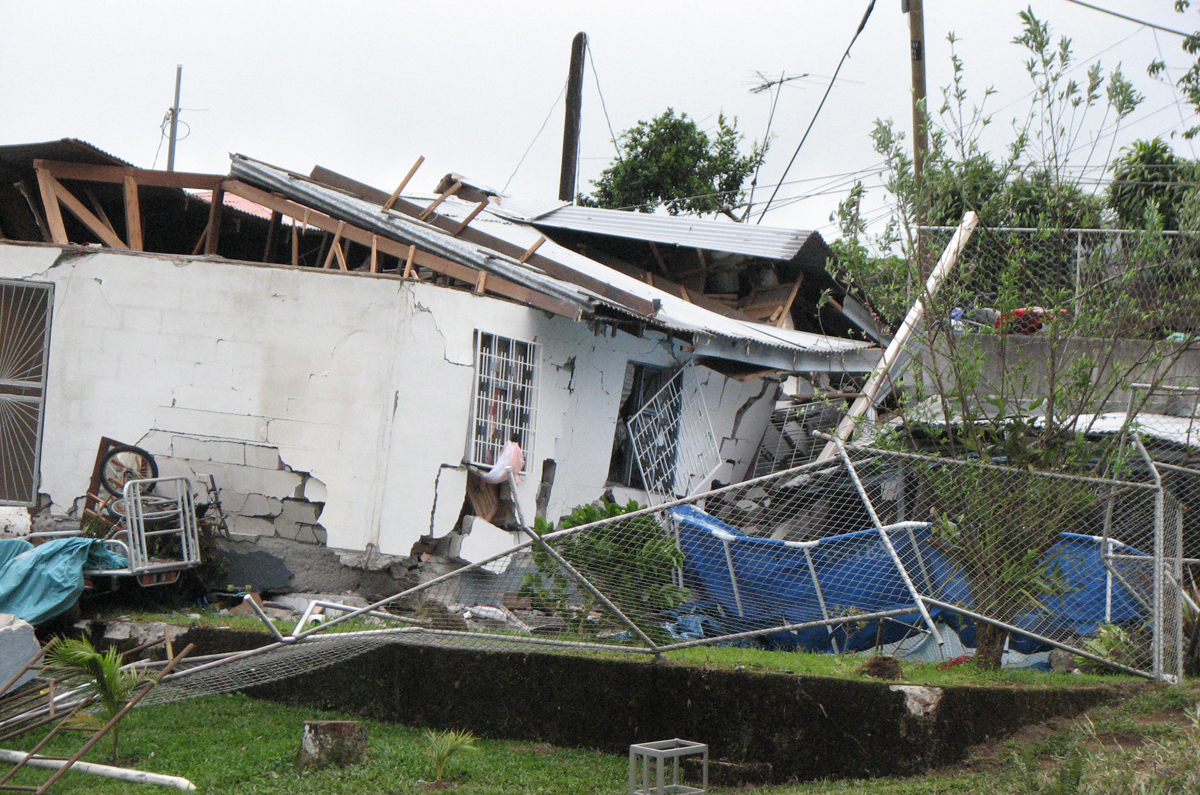
A house collapsed after earthquake.

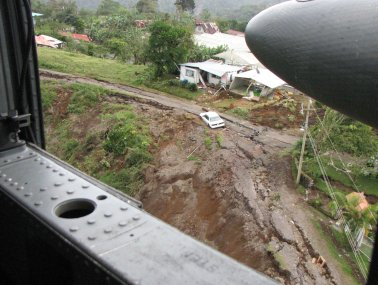
Landslide seen from a helicopter.

The earthquake took at least 34 lives, including at least three children, left 64 people missing, and injured at least 91. Hundreds of people were trapped and two villages were cut off. Most of the victims died when a landslide occurred near the La Paz waterfall by the Poás Volcano, and 452 people including 369 tourists were evacuated from the area in helicopters. 1,244 people were displaced in the immediate aftermath. In addition, a hotel, houses, roads, and vehicles were damaged, and several bridges were also destroyed. The town of Cinchona was severely hit, and all of the buildings there were heavily damaged. Power was temporarily disrupted in San José.

== Aftermath ==
The Costa Rican Red Cross sent at least 400 people to assist in the recovery. The agency said, "Some 42 communities were affected and sustained serious impacts on civil and electrical infrastructure... [They] are going to need a lot of help." Four helicopters were also dispatched in order to help aid efforts. The Comisión Nacional de Emergencias (National Emergency Commission) requested private helicopters to help with the aid. Additionally, the United States and Colombia dispatched helicopters with aid to assist with the relief and recovery efforts.

About 2,000 aftershocks were felt throughout Costa Rica.

On January 12, President Oscar Arias declared a five-day period of national grieving out of respect for the victims, and asked the organizers postpone the Fiestas de Palmares, which is Costa Rica's largest and most anticipated festival that lasts for a fortnight every January.

On January 13, the Banco de Costa Rica announced that it would offer home financing credit to homeowners who want to rebuild or fix their home.

== See also ==
- List of earthquakes in 2009
- List of earthquakes in Costa Rica
