= 2009 Shizuoka earthquake =

Earthquake in Japan

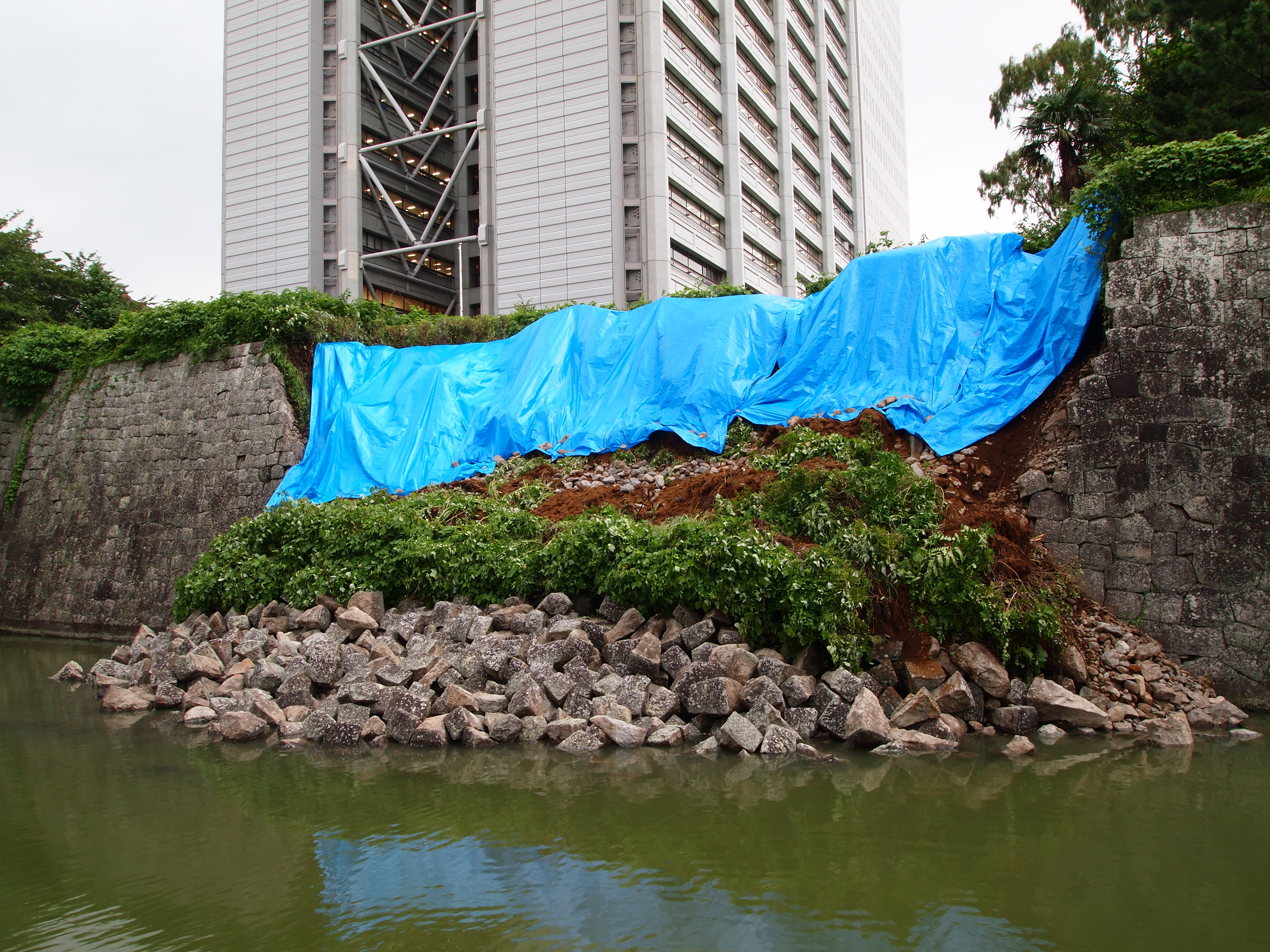

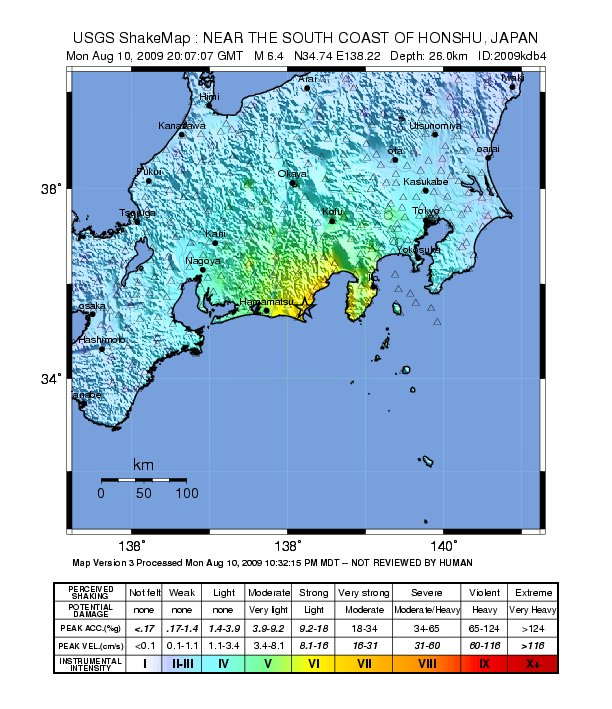

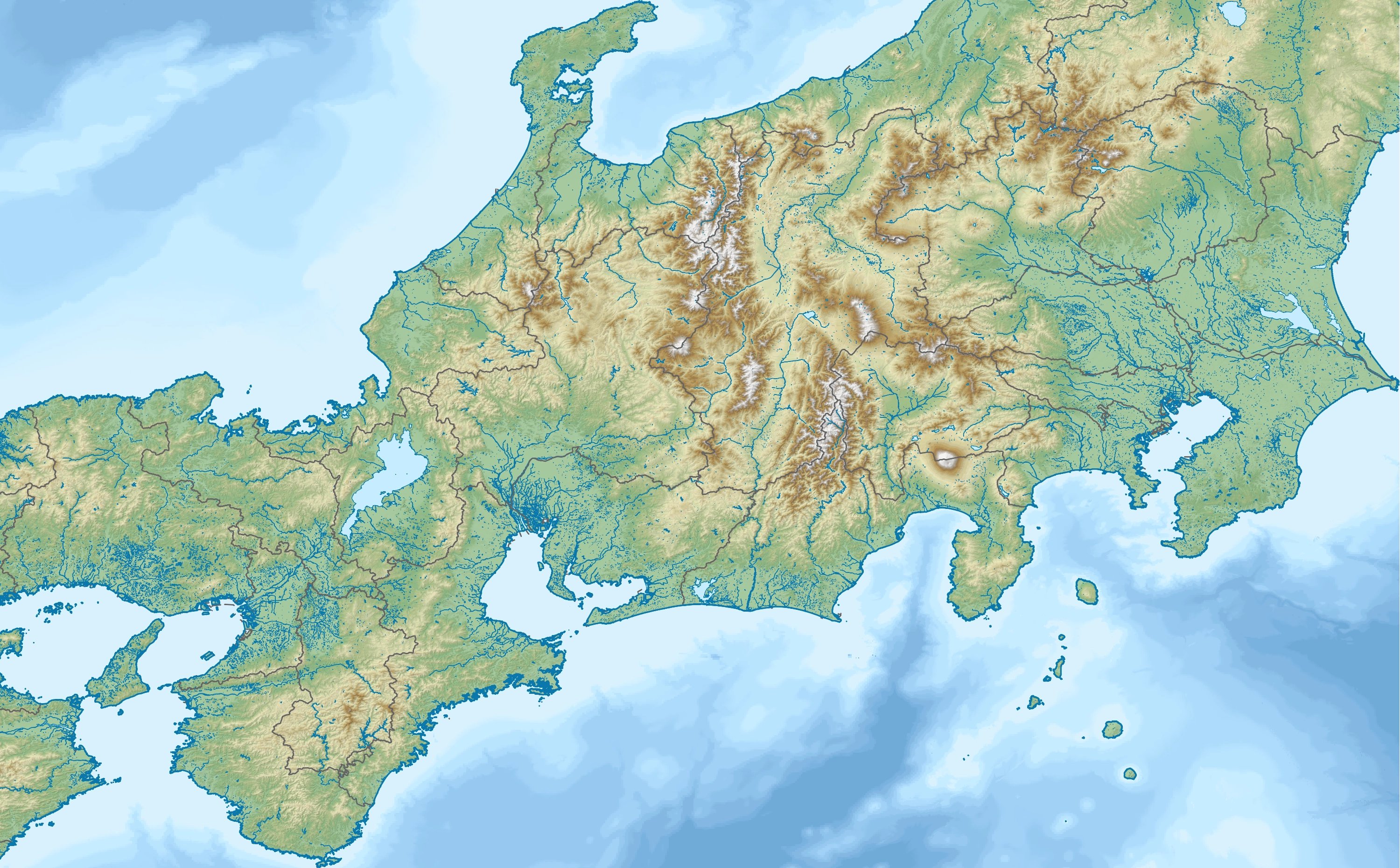
- Location within Shizuoka Prefecture Location within Central Japan
- UTC time: 2009-08-10 20:07:09
- ISC event: 15742574
- USGS-ANSS: ComCat
- Local date: 11 August 2009
- Local time: 05:07
- Magnitude: 6.4 M_{w}
- Depth: 26 km (16 mi)
- Epicenter: 34.778°N 138.276°E
- Areas affected: Japan
- Max. intensity: MMI VI (Strong) JMA 6−
- Casualties: 1 fatality 134 injuries

The 2009 Shizuoka earthquake occurred with a magnitude of 6.4, hitting Shizuoka Prefecture in the south of Honshū, Japan, on August 11 at 05:07 local time (August 10, 20:07 UTC).

== Overview ==
The seismic intensity was observed as shindo 6- in Izu, Yaizu, Makinohara, Omaezaki, Shizuoka.

One woman was killed in Shizuoka, 134 people were injured, and 6,000 buildings were damaged. In addition, the shoulder of Tōmei Expressway was damaged.

In this area, it is presumed that an M8 class Tokai earthquake will occur in the near future.

== See also ==
- Earthquake Early Warning (Japan)
- Fault (geology)
- List of earthquakes in 2009
- List of earthquakes in Japan
- Yoshinobu Ishikawa
