= 2009 Andaman Islands earthquake =

2009 earthquake in South Asia

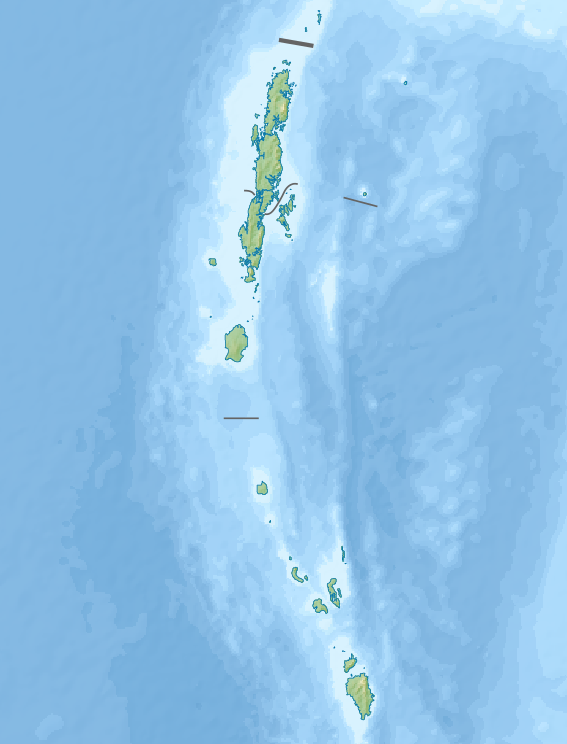
- Location within Andaman and Nicobar Islands Location within India
- UTC time: 2009-08-10 19:55:38
- ISC event: 15190110
- USGS-ANSS: ComCat
- Local date: August 11, 2009
- Local time: 01:25
- Magnitude: 7.5 M_{w}
- Depth: 24.0 km (14.9 mi)
- Epicenter: 14.013°N 92.923°E
- Areas affected: India
- Max. intensity: MMI V (Moderate)
- Casualties: None

The 2009 Andaman Islands earthquake occurred on August 11 at 19:55 UTC in the Andaman Islands of India. The earthquake magnitude was recorded as 7.5 M_{w}, and was the strongest in the region since the 2004 Indian Ocean earthquake and tsunami. The epicentre was 260 km north of Port Blair, and tremors were felt in south-east India, Bangladesh, Myanmar, and Thailand. The Pacific Tsunami Warning Center issued a tsunami watch to India, Myanmar, Bangladesh, Indonesia and Thailand, but it was later lifted. No casualties or injuries were reported, although there were complaints about minor damage to buildings.

== See also ==
- List of earthquakes in 2009
- List of earthquakes in India
