= 2009 Xinjiang earthquake =

5.1 Mw earthquake in Xinjiang, China

- Location within China
- UTC time: 2009-01-25 01:47:47
- ISC event: n/a
- USGS-ANSS: ComCat
- Local date: 25 January 2009
- Local time: 09:47:47 CST
- Magnitude: 5.1 M_{w}^{(USGS)}
- Depth: 10 kilometres (6.2 mi)
- Epicenter: 43.3°N 80.9°E
- Type: Dip-slip (reverse)
- Areas affected: China
- Total damage: $US 3.1 million
- Max. intensity: MMI V (Moderate)
- Casualties: None

An earthquake occurred in the Xinjiang of the People's Republic of China at 9:47 a.m in Qapqal on January 25, 2009.

== Location ==
The epicenter was at 43.3 degrees north latitude and 80.9 degrees east longitude at a depth of 10 km (6.2 mi) according to the China Earthquake Administration. The quake occurred 700 km (430 mi) from the regional capital Ürümqi.

== Damage ==
It has affected more than 4,500 people and caused house collapses and other damage. In total, 4,549 people in the Xibe Autonomous County of Qapqal and Zhaosu County were affected. They have been relocated to schools, government buildings and tents, said a regional civil affairs department official. No casualties have been reported so far.

A total of 198 houses collapsed and 2,928 were damaged. The direct economic loss was estimated at 21 million yuan ($US 3.1 million).

== See also ==
- List of earthquakes in 2009
- List of earthquakes in China
