= 2009 Swan Islands earthquake =

Earthquake affecting Central America

- Location within Central America
- UTC time: 2009-05-28 08:24:46
- ISC event: 12867661
- USGS-ANSS: ComCat
- Local date: May 28, 2009
- Local time: 02:24
- Magnitude: 7.3 M_{w}
- Depth: 10 kilometres (6.21 mi)
- Epicenter: 16.73°N 86.22°W
- Fault: Swan Islands Transform Fault
- Type: Strike-slip
- Areas affected: Honduras; Guatemala; Belize
- Max. intensity: MMI VII (Very strong)
- Tsunami: 4 m (13 ft)
- Casualties: 7 killed, 40 injured

The 2009 Swan Islands earthquake occurred on May 28 at 02:24:45 AM local time with a moment magnitude of 7.3 and a maximum Mercalli intensity of VII (Very strong). The epicenter was located in the Caribbean Sea, 64 kilometres (40 mi) northeast of the island of Roatán, 19 miles northeast of Port Royal, Isla de Bahias, 15 miles northwest of Isla Barbaretta, and 130 kilometres (81 mi) north-northeast of La Ceiba. Three aftershocks followed the earthquake within magnitude 4 range.

== Earthquake ==
The earthquake occurred at a depth of around 10 kilometres (6.2 mi) on a transform fault zone known as the Swan Islands Transform Fault on the southern margin of the Cayman Trough. It was a result of left-lateral strike-slip faulting. The Swan Island Transform Fault forms part of the tectonic boundary between the North American plate and the Caribbean plate, and continues onshore as the Motagua Fault and the Chixoy-Polochic Fault.

The 30-second offshore quake was felt in Guatemala, El Salvador, Belize, and as far as Cancún in Mexico. It was also felt in parts of Nicaragua, Costa Rica, Panama, Colombia, Cuba, Jamaica, and the Cayman Islands.

Analysis of geodetic and seismic data indicated that up to 1 meter of slip occurred across a 250-km-long fault rupture. Although the epicenter was located far off the coast of Central America, the long rupture contributed to severe damage in Honduras. The earthquake ruptured a segment of plate boundary immediately east of the 1976 earthquake rupture on the Motagua Fault.

=== Tsunami ===
A tsunami was observed with heights of 4 m (13 ft) in Motagua River, Guatemala.

== Damage ==
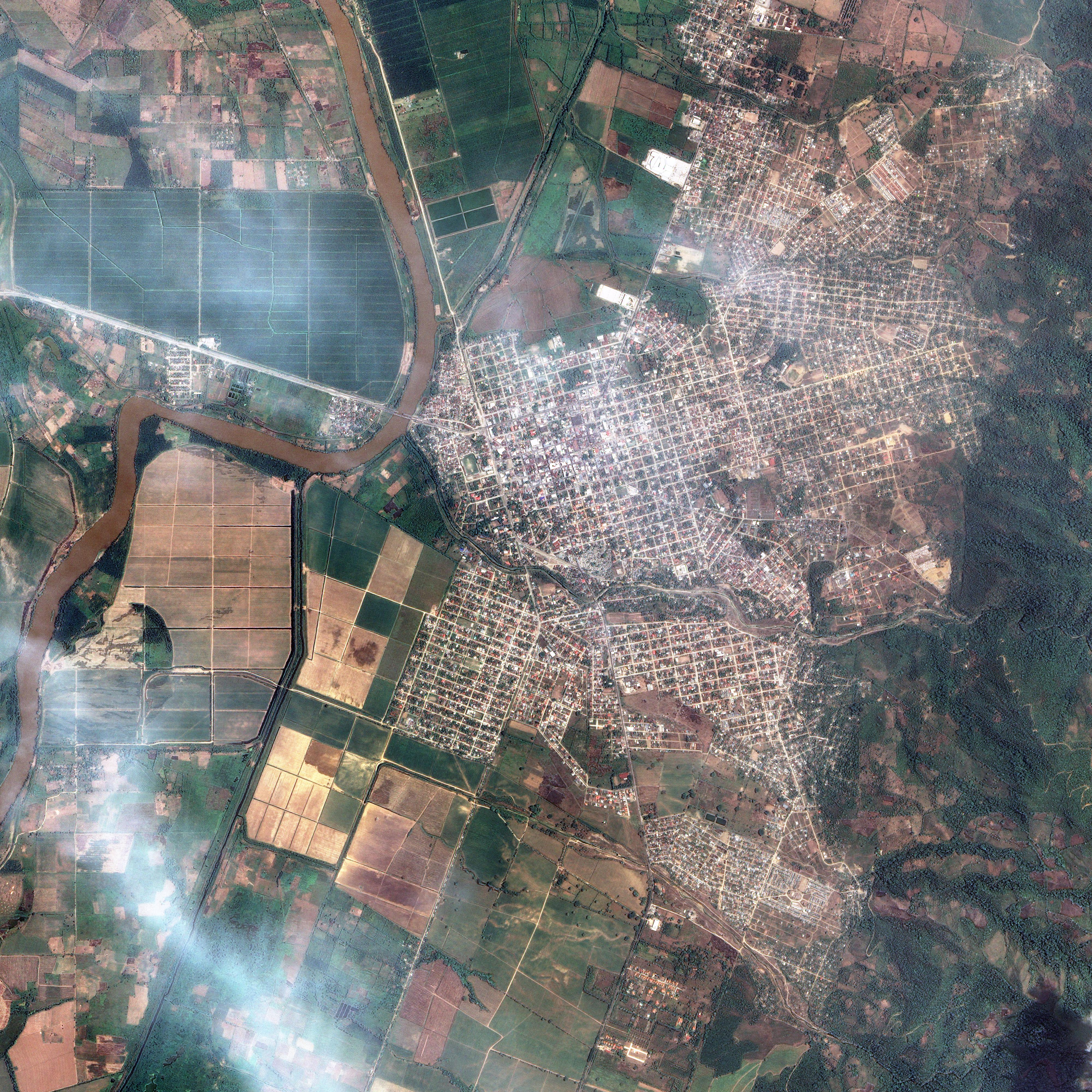
The damaged Democracy Bridge in El Progreso

The earthquake caused at least seven fatalities, 40 injuries, and more than 130 collapsed or damaged buildings across northern Honduras. Two important bridges and a number of levees and port terminals were also seriously damaged. In the Guatemalan department of Izabal, 35 buildings were destroyed and 80 were damaged. In Belize, at least 5 buildings were also destroyed and 25 were damaged. In Roatan, one home was damaged and one injury occurred. The earthquake caused an estimated $37 million worth of damage, and electricity, Internet and telephone connections were cut throughout the majority of Honduras.

A tsunami watch was put into effect by the Pacific Tsunami Warning Center for Honduras, Guatemala, and Belize and was discontinued 90 minutes after the earthquake occurred.

== See also ==
- List of earthquakes in 2009
- 2018 Swan Islands earthquake
