= List of earthquakes in Vanuatu =

Earthquakes in Vanuatu are frequent and are sometimes accompanied by tsunami, though these events are not often destructive. The archipelago, which was formerly known as New Hebrides, lies atop a complex and active plate boundary in the southwestern Pacific Ocean.

Overall, the population in this region resides in structures that are highly vulnerable to earthquake shaking, though some resistant structures exist. Most buildings in Vanuatu are constructed with lumber.

== Tectonic setting ==
The primary tectonic feature of the 1,200 km (750 mi) island chain is the New Hebrides Trench, the convergent boundary between the Australian and Pacific plates. Along the Wadati–Benioff zone, earthquake activity has been observed as shallow, intermediate, and deep-focus events at depths of up to 700 km (430 mi). Volcanic activity is also present along this north-northwest trending and northeast-dipping subduction zone.

While much of the island arc experiences intermediate-depth earthquakes along a Wadati–Benioff zone that dips steeply at 70°, the area adjacent to the d'Entrecasteaux Ridge does not. There is a corresponding gap in seismicity that occurs below 50 km (31 mi) where it enters the subduction zone from the west. According to the NUVEL-1 global relative plate motion model, convergence is occurring at roughly 8 cm (3.1 in) per year. The uncertainty, which also affects the Tonga arc, is due to the influence of spreading at the North Fiji Basin. Of the 58 M7 or greater events that occurred between 1909 and 2001, few were studied.

== Earthquakes ==
Date	Region	Mag.	MMI	Deaths	Injuries	Comments	Ref
2024-12-17	Efate	7.3 M_{w}	IX	14	265	Severe damage	
2023-01-08	Espiritu Santo	7.0 M_{w}	VII			Major damage	
2018-12-16	Ambrym	5.5 M_{w}	VI			Several houses destroyed	
2018-08-21	Pentecost	6.5 M_{w}	VII		1	Minor damage	
2010-12-25	Tafea	7.3 M_{w}	V		4	Minor damage / tsunami	
2010-08-10	Shefa	7.3 M_{w}	VII			Buildings damaged / power outages	
2009-10-07	Torba	7.4 M_{w}	VIII				
2009-10-07	Torba	7.8 M_{w}	VII			Tsunami	
2009-10-07	Torba	7.7 M_{w}	IX				
2009-06-03	Efate	6.3 M_{w}	VI		4	Landslides	
2009-05-29	Efate	5.7 M_{w}	VI		10	Landslides / damage	
2007-08-01	Sanma	7.2 M_{w}	VII		1	Many buildings damaged	
2002-11-28	Torba	5.9 M_{w}	VII		3	Landslides / damage	
2002-01-03	Efate	7.2 M_{w}	X		Several	Rockslides / damage	
1999-11-26	Ambrym	7.4 M_{w}	VIII	5–10	40–100	Landslides / damage / five killed by tsunami	
1999-08-22	Ambrym	6.6 M_{w}	IX			Foreshock / landslides	
1997-04-21	Santa Cruz Islands	7.7 M_{w}	VII			Some damage / tsunami	
1992-10-11	Tanna	7.4 M_{w}	VIII				
1990-07-27	Espiritu Santo	7.2 mb	VII		2	Moderate damage	
1973-12-29	Espiritu Santo	7.2 M_{s}	VIII			Moderate damage	
1973-12-29	Espiritu Santo	7.5 M_{s}	VIII			Moderate damage	NGDC 1972
1971-10-27	Tutuba	6.8 M_{w}	VI	1	Some	Severe damage	
1965-08-11	Malakula	7.6 M_{w}	IX			Moderate damage / tsunami	NGDC 1972
1910-11-10	Malakula	7.3 M_{w}	VI			Moderate damage / tsunami	NGDC 1972
1909-07-08						Moderate damage / tsunami	NGDC 1972
1863-08-17		7.5					
Note: The inclusion criteria for adding events are based on WikiProject Earthquakes' notability guideline that was developed for stand alone articles. The principles described also apply to lists. In summary, only damaging, injurious, or deadly events should be recorded.

== See also ==
- List of tectonic plate interactions
- List of volcanoes in Vanuatu
