= 1999 Ambrym earthquake =

Earthquake and tsunami in Vanuatu

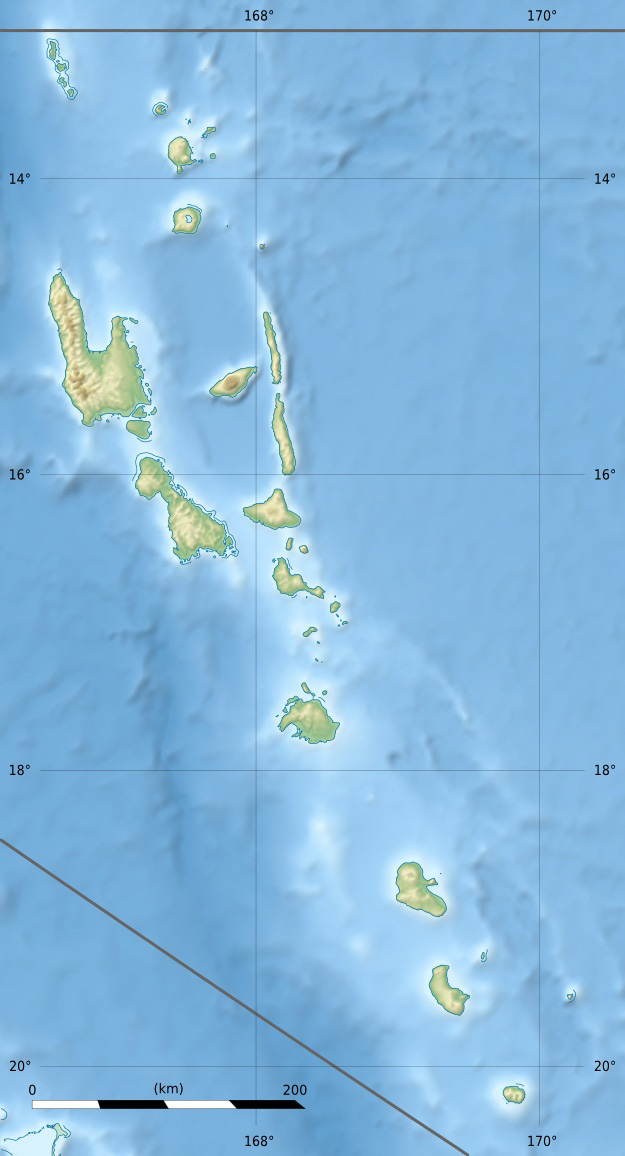
- Location within Vanuatu Location within Oceania
- UTC time: 1999-11-26 13:21:17
- ISC event: 1651802
- USGS-ANSS: ComCat
- Local date: November 27, 1999
- Local time: 00:21:17
- Magnitude: 7.4 M_{w}
- Depth: 30 km (19 mi)
- Epicenter: 16.41°S 168.15°E
- Fault: Back arc thrust belt
- Type: Oblique-thrust
- Total damage: Moderate
- Max. intensity: MMI VII (Very strong)
- Tsunami: 6.6 m (22 ft)
- Casualties: 5–10 dead, 40–100 injured

The 1999 Ambrym earthquake occurred on November 27 at 00:21:17 local time with a moment magnitude of 7.4 and a maximum Mercalli intensity of VII (Very strong). The back arc thrust event occurred within the Vanuatu archipelago, just to the south of the volcanic island of Ambrym. Vanuatu, which was previously known as New Hebrides, is subject to volcanic and earthquake activity because it lies on an active and destructive plate boundary called the New Hebrides Subduction Zone. While the National Geophysical Data Center classified the total damage as moderate, a destructive local tsunami did result in some deaths, with at least five killed and up to 100 injured.

This was one of very few events along the New Hebrides Subduction Zone that has been studied. Scientists from technical institutes in the region submitted papers to the scientific journals about the event, and while not all data on each of the aspects of the event are in agreement, what is certain is that the d'Entrecasteaux Ridge is producing unusual effects where it infringes into the subduction zone via the Indo-Australian plate.

== Tectonic setting ==
The primary tectonic feature of the 1,200 km (750 mi) island chain is the New Hebrides Subduction Zone, the convergent boundary between the Indo-Australian and Pacific plates. Along the Wadati–Benioff zone, earthquake activity has been observed as shallow, intermediate, and deep-focus events at depths of up to 700 km (430 mi). Volcanic activity is also present along this north-northwest trending and northeast-dipping subduction zone.

While much of the island arc experiences intermediate-depth earthquakes along a Wadati–Benioff zone that dips steeply at 70°, the area adjacent to the d'Entrecasteaux Ridge does not. There is a corresponding gap in seismicity that occurs below 50 km (31 mi) where it enters the subduction zone from the west. According to the NUVEL-1 global relative plate motion model, convergence is occurring at roughly 8 cm (3.1 in) per year. The uncertainty, which also affects the Tonga arc, is due to the influence of spreading at the North Fiji Basin. Of the 58 M7 or greater events that occurred between 1909 and 2001, few were studied.

== Earthquake ==
Scientists with the Institut de recherche pour le développement in New Caledonia investigated the extent of the aftershock zone and estimated that the rupture area was about 50 km × 25 km (31 mi × 16 mi), but an inversion of GPS-based displacement data showed a smaller rupture area of 35 km × 20 km (22 mi × 12 mi). It was also described as an intraplate event that occurred away from the east-dipping subduction interface on a west-dipping fault in an area with an uncertain type of convergence (either subduction or crustal thickening). The Harvard Centroid Moment Tensor project lists the slip vector as 67°, indicating that the mechanism was mostly thrust, with a significant amount of left-lateral strike-slip motion. Their submission for other fault parameters showed that the north-striking fault dipped shallowly at 30°.

=== Damage ===
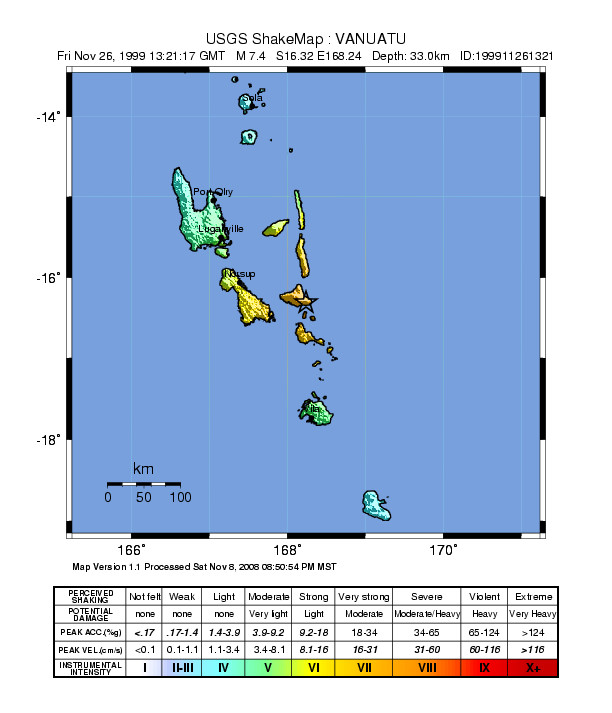
USGS ShakeMap for the event

Earthquake damage was limited to northern Pentecost Island, but the tsunami destroyed the village of Baie Martelli (population 300) on the southern tip of Pentecost. The loss of life there was minimal and could be attributed to well-educated people with regard to tsunami hazard, that even at the late hour, the villagers were awake because of a wedding celebration, and because of quick access to a safe area. Eyewitnesses described the initial phase of the tsunami as negative (withdrawal). This wave action came within 10 minutes of the earthquake and was followed shortly after by two larger waves that were separated by about 15 minutes. These waves destroyed all the buildings that were made of woven grass and corrugated metal roofs. The maximum height of the waves above sea level was 6.6 m (22 ft).

To the west of the epicenter on the island of Malakula, a moderate runup of just 1.8 m (5 ft 11 in) caused the wooden cargo ship Halimon to sink while it was at anchor in 10 m (33 ft) of water. The ship was loaded with 18 tons of copra (dried coconut meat). While the crew were asleep on board, the initial withdrawal of the tsunami caused the vessel to settle onto the bottom of the bay and list severely. Later, the first positive tsunami wave entered the harbor and swamped the vessel. Investigators were reminded of a similar situation from the much more destructive tsunami that followed the 1868 Arica earthquake in Chile that affected multiple vessels in a similar fashion.

=== Tsunami ===
A 6.6 m (22 ft) wave height was recorded at the southern tip of Pentecost at the village of Baie Martelli. There, all simple structures were destroyed, except for a church. While the USGS placed the epicenter to the south of Ambrym island (very close to the ISC-GEM coordinates on the map), the Harvard epicenter is to the north (somewhat between Pentecost and Ambrym). The northerly location could account for the greatest runup that was observed on the south shore of Pentecost and the north shore of Ambrym. The wave heights decreased with distance from that location, but scientists lacked a source for the unexpected runups (1.6 m (5 ft 3 in) to 2.6 m (8 ft 6 in)) that were seen well to the south on the island of Efate.

== See also ==
- 2009 Vanuatu earthquakes
- Geography of Vanuatu
- List of earthquakes in 1999
- List of earthquakes in Vanuatu
