= Azra District =

District of Logar Province, Afghanistan

Azra District عذرا
- District
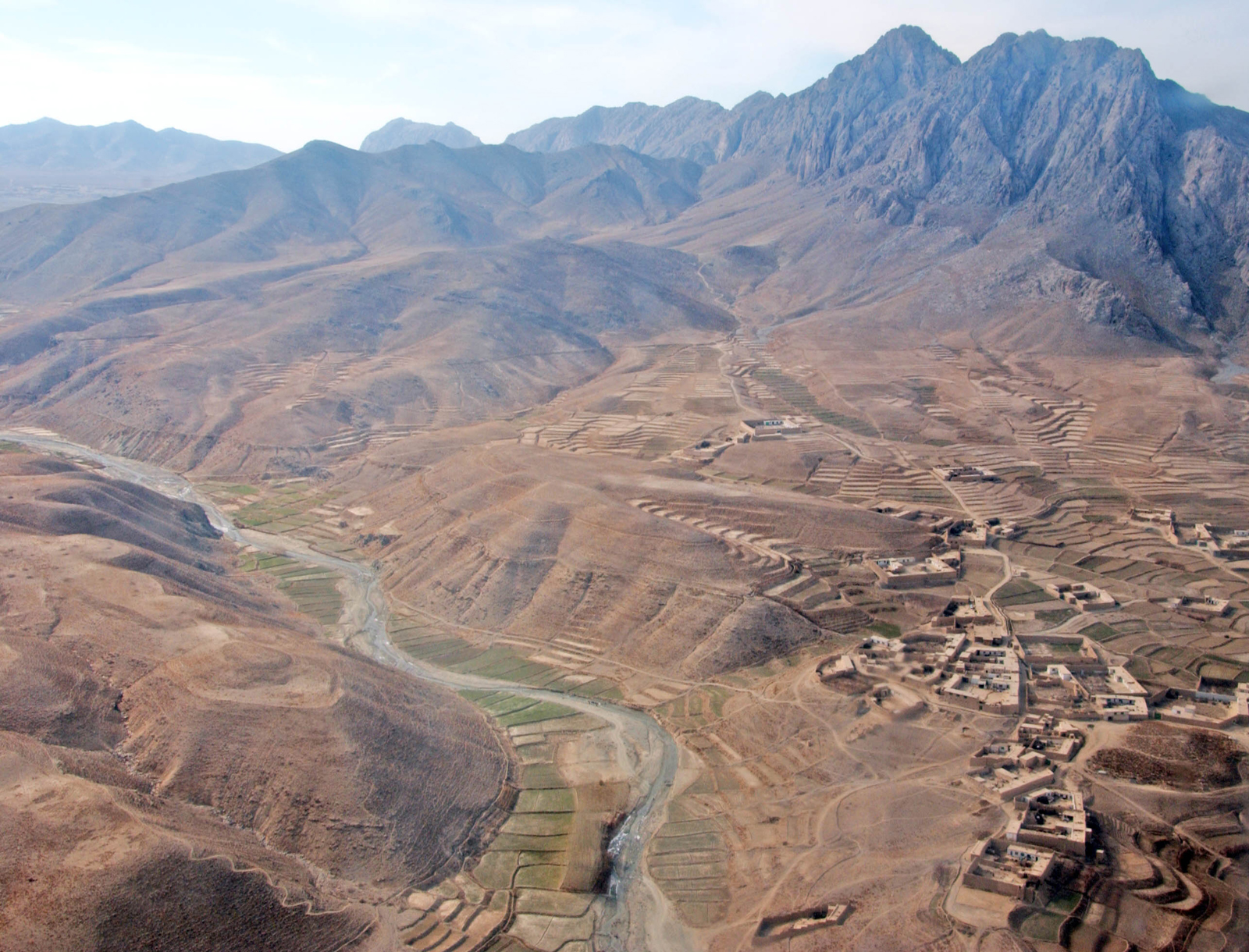
- Interactive map of Azra District
- Location within Afghanistan
- Coordinates: 34.1092°N 69.6244°E
- Country: Afghanistan
- Province: Logar

Azra District (Pashto: عذرا) is a district of Logar Province, Afghanistan. It is located in the eastern part of the district and is 142 kilometers (88 mi) from the capital Kabul. The district is geographically mountainous and produces a large amount of dry fruits.

== History ==
The area was used by Afghan mujahideen groups during the Soviet–Afghan War as there is a direct route to the country's capital of Kabul, which is 142 kilometers (88 mi) away.

On 30 June 2008, the Taliban seized control of the district. In 2011, a car bomb exploded outside a hospital in the district, killing 29 people and wounding 53; this was the third-most deadliest terrorist attack in Afghanistan after 2001. All of the roads leading to the district were seized by the Taliban in 2018.

== Geography ==
The Azra district is located in the eastern portion of the Logar Province. Almost the entirety of the district is mountainous and the Safed Koh passes through it.

== Government ==
In 2002, there were local shura in charge of mediating disputes, but they would refer issues to the district administrator appointed by the government if they were unable to resolve the issues.

== Economy ==
Hashish has been produced in the area since the 1980s and 50% of the agricultural lands in the district were used for cannabis cultivation according to a 1989 report by the United Nations High Commissioner for Refugees (UNHCR). Abdul Wali Wakil, a local councilor, reported in 2016 that 80% of the arable land in the district was being used for hashish.

== Education ==
There was one high school and five primary schools in 2002, that had a total of 30 teachers and 1,200 male students. At the time, these schools were lacking desks, chairs, textbooks, stationery, and salaries for teachers. The literacy rate was 10-15% in 2002.

== Demographics ==
The district is almost entirely populated by Pashtuns. An UNHCR for Refugees report lists the population of the area as 100% Pashtun in 1990, with 16,670 people inhabiting the area while an additional 14,497 were refugees in Pakistan. The population in 2019 was estimated to be 22,588.

== Works cited ==
=== News ===
- "Afghanistan: Deadly attack on Logar hospital". BBC. 25 June 2011. Archived from the original on 16 June 2025.
- "Taliban claims capturing Azra district". Afghan Islamic Press. 30 June 2008. Archived from the original on 16 June 2025.
- Azizi, Abdul (6 August 2018). "Taliban close all roads to Logar's Azra district". Pajhwok Afghan News. Archived from the original on 16 June 2025.

=== Web ===
- "District Profile" (PDF). United Nations High Commissioner for Refugees. 31 July 2002. Archived from the original (PDF) on 27 October 2005.
- "Estimated Population of Afghanistan 2019-20" (PDF). National Statistics and Information Authority. 18 November 2019. Archived from the original (PDF) on 9 June 2020.
- Ruttig, Thomas; Sabawoon, Ali (18 July 2020). "A Threat at Kabul's Southern Gate: A security overview of Logar province". Pajhwok Afghan News. Archived from the original on 16 June 2025.
