= 2009 West Papua earthquakes =

Earthquake in Southwest Papua, Indonesia

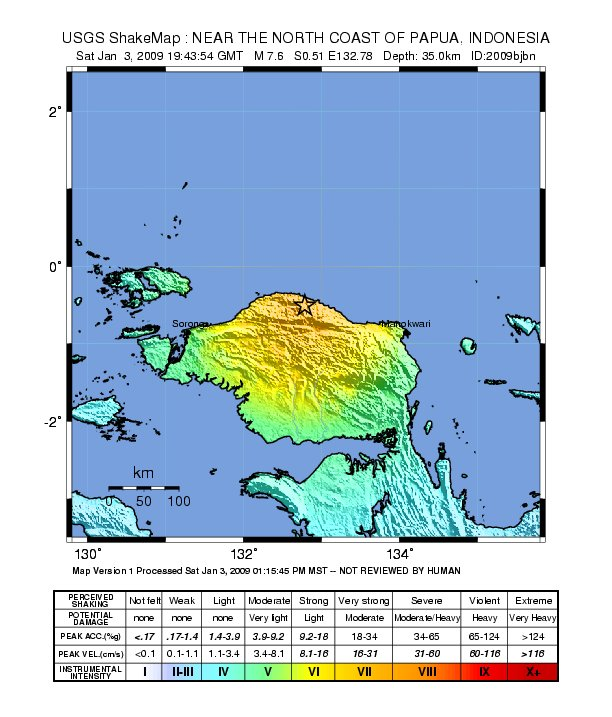

- Location within Indonesia
- UTC time: Doublet earthquake: A: 2009-01-03 19:43:55; B: 2009-01-03 22:33:42
- ISC event: A: 13989025; B: 13989020
- USGS-ANSS: A: ComCat; B: ComCat
- Local date: January 4, 2009
- Local time: A: 04:43; B: 07:23
- Magnitude: A: 7.6 M_{w}^{(GCMT)}; B: 7.4 M_{w}^{(GCMT)}
- Depth: 30 km (19 mi)
- Epicenter: 0.414°S 132.885°E
- Type: Thrust
- Areas affected: Indonesia
- Max. intensity: A: MMI VI (Strong); B: MMI VII (Very strong)
- Tsunami: 1.8 m (5 ft 11 in)
- Casualties: 4 dead, dozens injured

The 2009 West Papua earthquakes occurred on January 4 local time in Indonesia's Tambrauw Regency in Southwest Papua (then West Papua Province). The very large earthquake doublet comprised an initial moment magnitude (M_{w}) 7.6 shock during which the shaking reached a maximum intensity of VI (Strong) on the Modified Mercalli intensity scale and a second event measuring M_{w} 7.4 and a maximum Mercalli intensity of VII (Very strong). The events took place less than three hours apart to the east-northeast of Sorong on the Bird's Head Peninsula and left at least four people dead and dozens injured.

== Earthquake ==
There were twenty-three aftershocks above magnitude 5.0 and another at magnitude 6.0. The earthquakes were also felt in nearby Papua New Guinea and Darwin, Australia.

== Impact ==
An official of World Vision International, a humanitarian aid organization, said ten buildings had been destroyed, including several hotels and the house of a government official. Officials said three people, who had been staying at the Mutiara hotel in the city of Manokwari, were pulled alive from the rubble and taken to a hospital. Two hotels collapsed in the quake.

== See also ==
- List of earthquakes in 2009
- List of earthquakes in Indonesia
