= 2009 Talaud Islands earthquake =

Earthquake in indonesia

- Location within Indonesia
- UTC time: 2009-02-11 17:34:50
- ISC event: 13434474
- USGS-ANSS: ComCat
- Local date: February 12, 2009
- Local time: 01:34
- Magnitude: 7.2 M_{w}
- Depth: 20 km (12 mi)
- Epicenter: 3.89°N 126.39°E
- Type: Reverse
- Max. intensity: MMI VI (Strong)
- Casualties: 2 deaths, 64 injuries

The 2009 Talaud Islands earthquake occurred on February 12 at 01:34 local time (February 11, 2009 at 17:34 UTC) near Talaud Islands (Indonesian: Kepulauan Talaud), Indonesia. This reverse-type shock had a moment magnitude of 7.2 and a maximum Mercalli intensity of VI (Strong). There were at least 2 dead, 64 people injured and 597 buildings damaged in Talaud Islands. This earthquake could also be felt in the Philippines.

== See also ==
- List of earthquakes in 2009
- List of earthquakes in Indonesia
