= Karonga North (Malawi Parliament constituency) =

Karonga North is a constituency for the National Assembly of Malawi, located in the Karonga District of Malawi's Northern Region. It elects one Member of Parliament by the first past the post system. The constituency is currently represented by DPP MP Vincent Winstone Ghambi.

== Election results ==
Election	Political result	Candidate	Party	Votes	%	±%
Karonga North general election, 2014; 191 null & void votes Electorate: 36,682; Turnout: 27,591 (75.22%)	DPP hold Majority: 6,814 (24.87%)	Vincent Winstone Ghambi	DPP	16,029	58.50	
Karonga North general election, 2014; 191 null & void votes Electorate: 36,682; Turnout: 27,591 (75.22%)	DPP hold Majority: 6,814 (24.87%)	Kondwani Brian Nyasulu	PP	9,215	33.63	
Karonga North general election, 2014; 191 null & void votes Electorate: 36,682; Turnout: 27,591 (75.22%)	DPP hold Majority: 6,814 (24.87%)	Josephy Aggrey Donald Mwanjasi	MCP	1,393	5.08	–
Karonga North general election, 2014; 191 null & void votes Electorate: 36,682; Turnout: 27,591 (75.22%)	DPP hold Majority: 6,814 (24.87%)	Griffin Juju D.J. Kayira	UDF	536	1.96	–
Karonga North general election, 2014; 191 null & void votes Electorate: 36,682; Turnout: 27,591 (75.22%)	DPP hold Majority: 6,814 (24.87%)	Moston Mwipimeghe David Kayange	Independent	227	0.83	–
