= Karonga Central (Malawi Parliament constituency) =

Karonga Central is a constituency for the National Assembly of Malawi, located in the Karonga District of Malawi's Northern Region. It elects one Member of Parliament by the first past the post system. The constituency is currently vacant.
