= 2009 Karonga earthquakes =

- Location within Malawi
- UTC time
- A: 2009-12-06 17:36:36
- B: 2009-12-08 03:08:57
- C: 2009-12-12 02:27:03
- D: 2009-12-19 23:19:15
- ISC event
- A: 16413651
- B: 14010603
- C: 14094930
- D: 16413801
- USGS-ANSS
- A: ComCat
- B: ComCat
- C: ComCat
- D: ComCat
- Local date
- A: December 6, 2009
- B: December 8, 2009
- C: December 12, 2009
- D: December 20, 2009
- Local time
- A: 19:36 (CAT, UTC+2:00)
- B: 05:08
- C: 04:27
- D: 01:19
- Magnitude
- A: M_{w} 5.8
- B: M_{w} 5.9
- C: M_{w} 5.5
- D: M_{w} 6.0
- Depth
- A: 9.0 km
- B: 8.0 km
- C: 10.0 km
- D: 6.0 km
- Max. intensity: MMI VIII (Severe)
- Casualties: 4 dead, 300 injured

The 2009 Karonga earthquakes occurred near Karonga, Malawi in December 2009 near the northern tip of Lake Malawi in southeast Africa. The earthquakes were one of the biggest in the history of Malawi.

== Geology ==
Being in the southern East African Rift, the 100 km-long Livingstone Fault marks the limit of the Karonga Basin. The earthquakes, located at about 50 km west of the Livingstone Fault, occurred along previously unknown buried faults beneath the Quaternary unconsolidated sediments. Satellite-based geophysical investigations indicated that one of the west dipping faults which cut the Karonga Basin might have ruptured during the earthquakes. The studies also estimated a maximum slip of about 120 cm at 3–5 km depth with no evidence of dike-injection related activity associated with many earthquakes in Eastern Africa. Another study utilized aeromagnetic data to image the basement structure around the rupture area and found that multiple buried faults ruptured during the earthquake among which are the St. Mary Fault (extending over 37 km in length) and the Kaporo Fault which is 36 km long and is buried beneath Lake Malawi. Scientists have proposed that the dominance of seismicity in this part of northern Malawi may be due to the presence of pre-existing planes of weakness in the basement rocks that are favorably oriented to the tectonic stress field of the East African Rift.

== Earthquakes ==
| Date | Local Time (UTC +2) | Magnitude (M_{w}) | Latitude | Longitude | Depth | Casualties |
|---|---|---|---|---|---|---|
| December 6, 2009 | 19:36 | 5.8 | 10.16°S | 33.82°E | 10 km | |
| December 8, 2009 | 05:08 | 5.9 | 9.948°S | 33.878°E | 8 km | 1 |
| December 12, 2009 | 04:27 | 5.4 | 9.96°S | 33.88°E | 10 km | |
| December 19, 2009 | 15:02 | 6.0 | 10.108°S | 33.818°E | 6 km | 3 |

=== Intensity ===
The main earthquake could also be felt in Tanzania and Zambia.

== Damage ==
Over 1,000 houses collapsed, 2,900 others were damaged, 4 people were killed and 300 people were wounded in this earthquake sequence. The majority of the building collapse was caused by liquefaction that occurred within a shallow layer of saturated unconsolidated lake sediments along the shoreline. The locations of ground damage and liquefaction align with the fault that ruptured the earthquake.
