= 2009 West Java earthquake =

Earthquake in Indonesia

- Location within West Java Location within Indonesia
- UTC time: 2009-09-02 07:55:01
- ISC event: 15161670
- USGS-ANSS: ComCat
- Local date: 2 September 2009
- Local time: 14:55:01 WIB
- Magnitude: 7.0 M_{w}
- Depth: 49 km (30 mi)
- Epicenter: 7.782°S 107.297°E
- Areas affected: Indonesia
- Max. intensity: MMI VII (Very strong)
- Tsunami: 20 cm
- Casualties: 81 dead 1,297 injured 210,000 displaced

An earthquake occurred on September 2, 2009, at 14:55:01 local time in West Java, Indonesia. The magnitude 7.0 earthquake killed at least 81 people, injured over 1,297, and displaced over 210,000 (including more than 140,000 in Tasikmalaya regency). The quake was felt in the capital Jakarta, although damage there was minimal, and it was Indonesia's deadliest earthquake since the 2006 Pangandaran earthquake and tsunami.

== Cause ==
The earthquake's focus lies close to the major fault plane where the Indo-Australian plate is being subducted beneath the Eurasian plate. However, the focal mechanisms determined for this event shows reverse faulting at a high angle to the trend of the subduction zone and it has been suggested that the cause was deformation within the descending slab. Analysis of GPS data, tsunami run-ups and the effect of stress transfer compared to aftershock distribution supports a west-dipping reverse fault.

Another earthquake in the same subduction zone occurred only 5 days later in the ocean south of Yogyakarta. This newer quake (magnitude 6.2) is considered to be related to the West Java earthquake.

== Damage ==
Buildings in Bandung and Tasikmalaya, the town closest to the epicenter, were damaged, and hundreds of people were injured. An estimated 18,300 homes and offices were earlier thought to have been damaged. This figure later rose to 87,000.

The quake was felt in Jakarta, Indonesia's capital; causing evacuation in many office buildings and hotels. Several office buildings along major thoroughfares in Central Jakarta suffered damage.

At least 11 houses were covered by a landslide in Cianjur.

Around 37 inhabitants, including 13 children, of Cikangkareng were affected by a landslide caused by the quake and are thought to have been buried beneath rubble. The area has become a breeding ground for voyeurs who are flocking to the area to take photographs of the destruction and victims.

At least one hospital was destroyed by the quake.

== Victims ==
Confirmed death tolls by area were issued by The Jakarta Post on 4 September.

Area	Total
Cianjur	21
Garut	10
Tasikmalaya	9
Bandung	8
Ciamis	At least 1
Sukabumi	At least 1
Bogor	At least 1
West Bandung	At least 1 The Bandung Health Agency says nearby victims of the quake will be eligible for free medical treatment for at least a month. Rescuers have been equipped with machinery but are struggling. 34 doctors and 52 paramedics were sent to at least 12 districts. More than 25,000 affected people were housed in makeshift tents. A group of 30 volunteers comprising Malaysian medical students from several universities in Indonesia, headed by Malaysian Students Department director in Indonesia Dr Junaidi Abu Bakar were deployed to provide assistance. They provided food and clothing as well as meals for the breaking of fast.

== See also ==
- List of earthquakes in 2009
- List of earthquakes in Indonesia
