= Karonga Nyungwe (Malawi Parliament constituency) =

Karonga Nyungwe is a constituency for the National Assembly of Malawi, located in the Karonga District of Malawi's Northern Region. It elects one Member of Parliament by the first past the post system. The constituency is currently represented by Kenneth Ndovie, who won on independent ticket. Kenneth Ndovie is currently affiliated with the United Transformation Movement [UTM].
