= 2009 Bhutan earthquake =

Magnitude 6.1 earthquake in Bhutan

- Location within Bhutan
- UTC time: 2009-09-21 08:53:05
- ISC event: 13788745
- USGS-ANSS: ComCat
- Local date: 21 September 2009
- Local time: 14:53:05
- Magnitude: 6.1 M_{w}
- Depth: 14 kilometres (8.7 mi)
- Epicenter: 27.346°N 91.412°E
- Areas affected: Bhutan; India; China
- Max. intensity: MMI VI (Strong)
- Casualties: 12 dead, 15 injured

The 2009 Bhutan earthquake occurred on 21 September at 14:53 BTT (08:53 UTC) in the eastern region of Bhutan with moment magnitude of 6.1. The epicenter was situated at 180 kilometres (110 mi) east of the capital Thimphu, in Monggar District. However, Bangladesh and northern India also felt it, with residents in Guwahati, Assam reporting cracks in buildings. The tremors were felt as far as Tibet.

At least eleven people are reported to have been killed—seven in Bhutan, four in India. The death toll, initially ten, increased when one more died in the night. At least fifteen were wounded. Many of the deaths in Bhutan came about when their houses fell in on top of them. The Indians were construction workers whose road fell through. At least 5,167 homes and buildings were damaged or destroyed.

One businessman said the earthquake happened as shopping was underway for the Blessed Rainy Day ceremony of Buddhism. Another inhabitant said it "made the surrounding hills look like they were throwing up dust" and that "the road was suddenly filled with boulders and mud". Thousands are living outdoors as a result. Children were crushed under structures as they caved in. Roads were blocked but these were cleaned up relatively quickly. Monasteries were also struck. People ran for their lives out of their homes.

== Aftershocks ==
There were at least seven aftershocks.

An earthquake measuring 5.7 on the Richter scale was heard in Myanmar and the northeast Indian states of Assam, Arunachal Pradesh, Nagaland and Manipur and the following day.

== Reaction ==
Prime Minister of Bhutan Jigme Thinley said the earthquake was "one of the biggest disasters in recent times". He also said the length of the earthquake (95 seconds) was "very long". He and his home minister embarked on a visit to the region.
