= Karonga North West (Malawi Parliament constituency) =

Electoral constituency of the Parliament of Malawi

Karonga North West is a constituency for the National Assembly of Malawi, located in the Karonga District of Malawi's Northern Region. It elects one Member of Parliament by the first past the post system. The constituency was represented by Democratic Progressive Party MP James Bond Kamwambi until his death in 2021. He was the second MP to die from COVID-19. The 49,000 registered voters were then given a bi-election.
