= Karonga Airport =

Airport in Bwiba, Malawi

- IATA: KGJ; ICAO: FWKA

Summary
- Airport type: Public
- Owner: Malawi Government
- Operator: Malawi Civil Aviation
- Serves: Karonga, Malawi
- Location: Bwiba
- Elevation AMSL: 1,765 ft (538 m)
- Coordinates: 09°57′12″S 033°53′34″E

Map
- Location of airport in Malawi

Runways
Direction	Length		Surface
Direction	m	ft	Surface
14/32	1,280	4,200	Asphalt
- Source: DAFIF

Karonga Airport (IATA: KGJ, ICAO: FWKA) is an airport serving Karonga, a town in the Northern Region of the Republic of Malawi.

== Facilities ==
The airport resides at an elevation of 1,765 feet (538 m) above mean sea level. It has one runway designated 14/32 with an asphalt surface measuring 1,280 by 18 metres (4,199 ft × 59 ft).
