= Karonga =

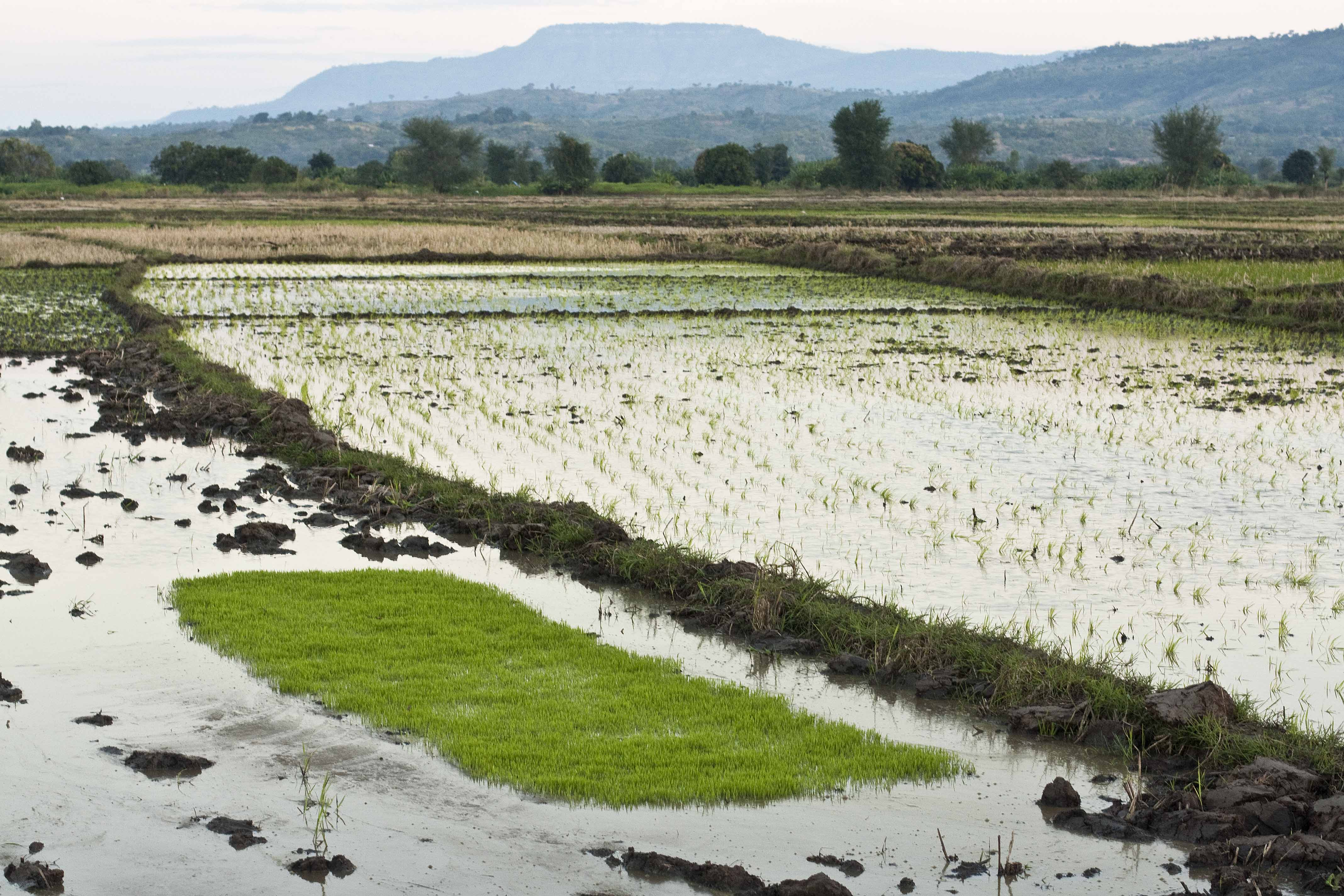
- Rice fields in Karonga

- Location in Malawi
- Coordinates: 09°56′00″S 33°56′00″E
- Country: Malawi
- Region: Northern Region
- District: Karonga District
- Elevation: 478 m (1,568 ft)

Population (2018 Census)
  - Total: 61,609
- Time zone: +2
- Climate: Aw

Karonga is a township in the Karonga District in Northern Region of Malawi in southeastern Africa. Located on the western shore of Lake Malawi, it was established as a slaving centre sometime before 1877. As of 2018 estimates, Karonga has a population of 61,609. The common and major language spoken in this district is the Tumbuka language, which is also a regional language of Northern Malawi.

== History ==
Pre-historic tools and remains of hominids discovered in Malawi's remote northern district of Karonga provides further proof that the area could be the cradle of humankind. Professor Friedemann Schrenk of the Goethe University in Frankfurt told Reuters News that two students working on the excavation site in September 2009 had discovered prehistoric tools and a tooth of a hominid. "This latest discovery of prehistoric tools and remains of hominids provides additional proof to the theory that the Great Rift Valley of Africa and perhaps the excavation site near Karonga can be considered the cradle of humankind." Schrenk said. The site also contains some of the earliest dinosaurs which lived between 100 million and 140 million years ago and early hominids believed to have lived between a million and 6 million years ago. The discovery was at Malema excavation site 10 km (6 mi) from Karonga.

In terms of more recent prehistory, Karonga has an abundance of Pleistocene and Holocene archaeological materials dating especially to the Middle and Later Stone Ages, as well as the Iron Age.

Some time before 1877 Karonga existed as the stronghold of Mlozi, a famous Arab slaver. In 1883 a British trading post, which formed the basis of the modern town, was opened there. British explorer Sir Harry Johnston bought the post in 1895 and ended the slave trade on Lake Nyasa's western shore. At this point Karonga became an important commercial and agricultural centre. According to Lonely Planet, the town "still bears a strong Swahili-Arab influence today."

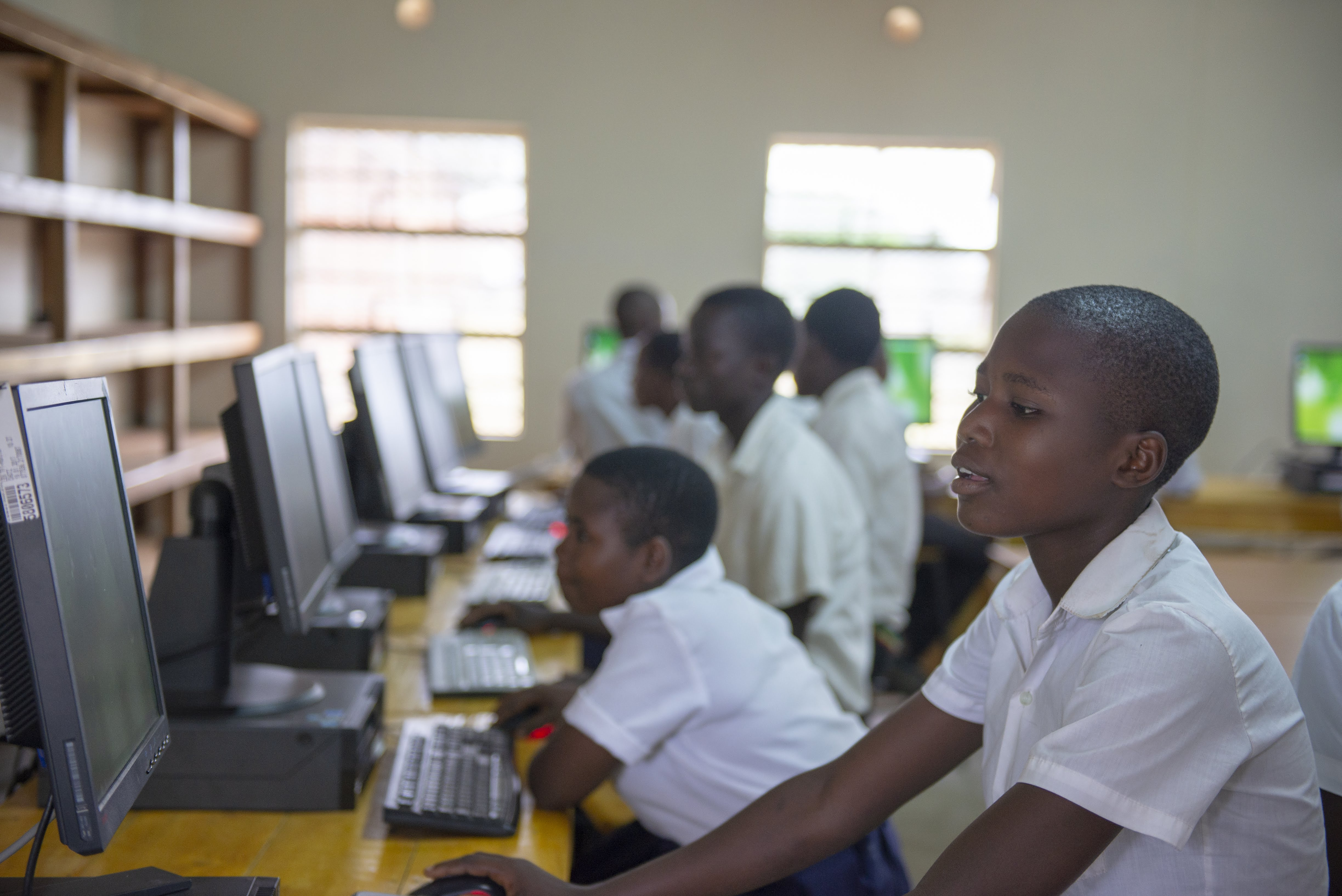
The computer lab at Nyungwe CDSS Secondary School in 2018

Karonga Girls Secondary School opened in the centre of the town in 1998. In 2023 there was concern that girls were being turned away from education because there was insufficient funds to cover their education. Nyungwe CDSS Secondary School was one of nine schools chosen to receive HD TVs and tablets as part of an initiative by Airtel Malawi and UNICEF. The scheme included internet access and free use of five educational sites. The scheme was lauded by the education minister Madalitso Wirima.

On 11 July 2008 the Kayelekera mine in Karonga celebrated 1.5 million hours of accident-free uranium mining. "Analysts" claim this is a rare achievement. The mine previously met with controversy due to exposing people to radiation.

In December 2009 the area suffered a series of earthquakes.

In 2026, Richard Chimwendo Banda who was the Leader of the House in Parliament and the Minister of Local Government, Unity and Culture announced that Karonga would return to having a town council.

== Geography ==
Karonga is at an elevation of 478 metres (1,568 ft) on the western shore of Lake Nyasa. It is situated 28 kilometres (17 1/4 mi) from Kenan Ngomba, 18 km (11 mi) from Kaporo, 42.5 km (26 1/2 mi) from Kilondo and 12 km (7 1/2 mi) from Lupembe.

== Demographics ==
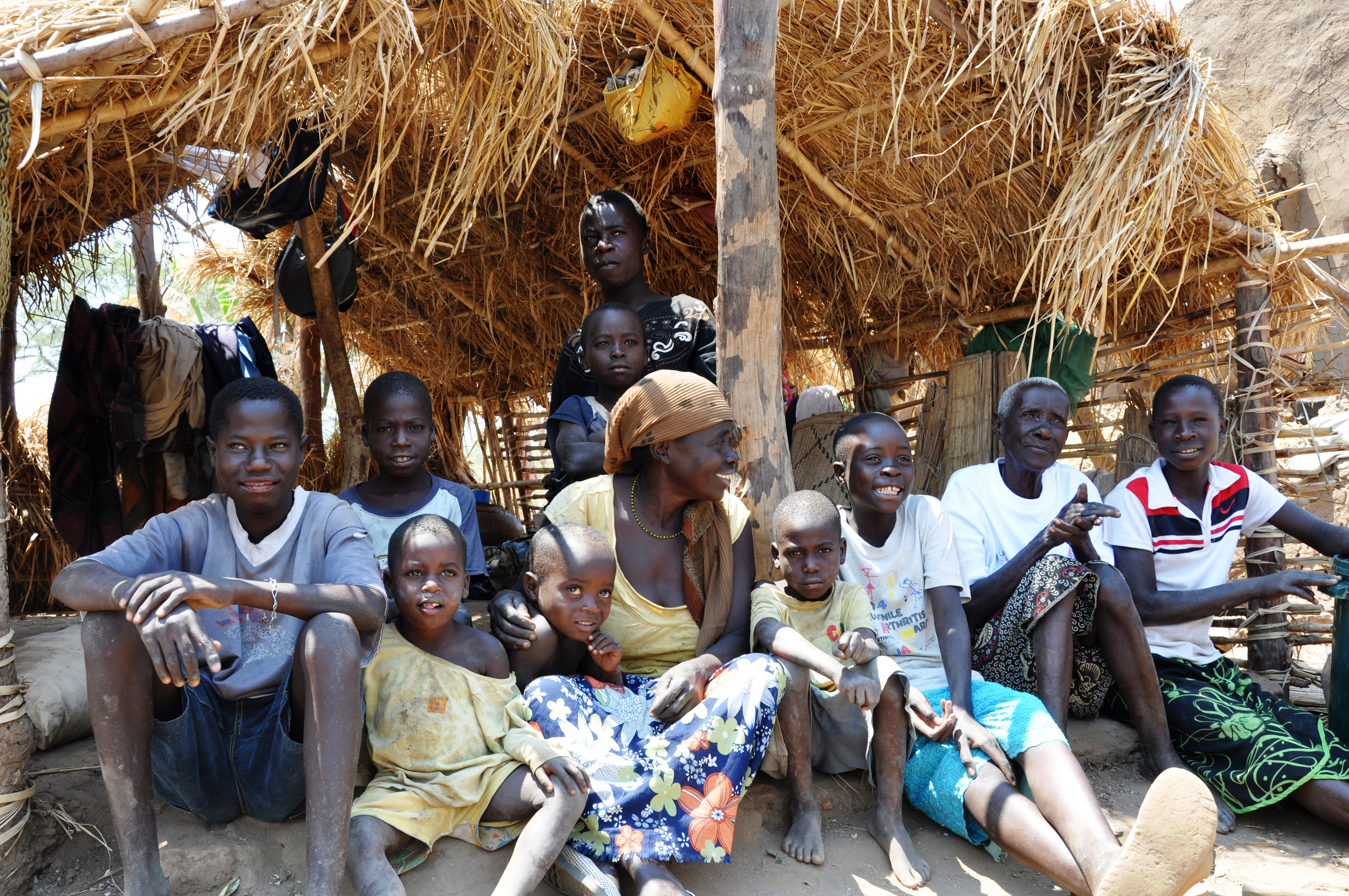
Edicas Nachinga and her grandchildren in Karonga, 2010

Year	Population
1977	11,873
1987	19,667
1998	27,811
2008	40,334
2018	61,609

Historical population
Year	Pop.	±% p.a.
1977	11,873	—
1987	19,667	+5.18%
1998	27,811	+3.20%
2008	40,334	+3.79%
2018	61,609	+4.33%

=== Languages ===
Tumbuka is commonly used in Karonga for both home and school. Karonga is known as "an island of Tumbuka language and culture in a sea of Tumbuka and Ngonde people."

== Economy ==
The economy of the area is based on cotton, rice and maize production along the lake and on coffee and livestock in the west. Karongans are dependent on subsistence fishing.

== Climate ==
Karonga's climate is classified as tropical. The summers are much rainier than the winters in Karonga. The climate here is classified as Aw by the Köppen-Geiger system. In Karonga, the average annual temperature is 25.6 °C (78.8 °F).

Climate data for Karonga
Month	Jan	Feb	Mar	Apr	May	Jun	Jul	Aug	Sep	Oct	Nov	Dec	Year
Mean daily maximum °C (°F)	29.6 (85.3)	29.6 (85.3)	29.3 (84.7)	29.0 (84.2)	28.7 (83.7)	27.6 (81.7)	27.3 (81.1)	28.3 (82.9)	30.6 (87.1)	32.5 (90.5)	32.4 (90.3)	30.5 (86.9)	29.6 (85.3)
Daily mean °C (°F)	24.9 (76.8)	25.0 (77.0)	24.7 (76.5)	24.6 (76.3)	23.6 (74.5)	22.2 (72.0)	21.7 (71.1)	22.4 (72.3)	24.3 (75.7)	26.4 (79.5)	27.0 (80.6)	25.7 (78.3)	24.4 (75.9)
Mean daily minimum °C (°F)	21.8 (71.2)	21.7 (71.1)	21.5 (70.7)	21.3 (70.3)	19.9 (67.8)	17.9 (64.2)	17.0 (62.6)	17.6 (63.7)	19.4 (66.9)	21.9 (71.4)	23.0 (73.4)	22.4 (72.3)	20.4 (68.7)
Average precipitation mm (inches)	132.3 (5.21)	120.0 (4.72)	206.0 (8.11)	130.0 (5.12)	19.4 (0.76)	0.8 (0.03)	0.8 (0.03)	0.3 (0.01)	0.0 (0.0)	1.3 (0.05)	39.4 (1.55)	149.0 (5.87)	799.3 (31.47)
Average relative humidity (%)	79	80	82	80	74	66	65	64	60	56	62	75	70
Mean monthly sunshine hours	176.7	170.8	207.7	222.0	254.2	264.0	285.2	306.9	306.0	319.3	273.0	213.9	2,999.7
Mean daily sunshine hours	5.7	6.1	6.7	7.4	8.2	8.8	9.2	9.9	10.2	10.3	9.1	6.9	8.2
Source: NOAA

== Arts and culture ==
The Cultural & Museum Centre Karonga is Karonga's most popular attraction to tourists. It is home to the Malawisaurus, a 150-million-year-old fossil discovered 45 kilometres (28 mi) south of the district. It displays an exhibit entitled "From Dinosaurs to Democracy", which chronicles the area's history.

== Infrastructure ==
Karonga is home to the Karonga Airport which handles only daytime domestic flights for Air Malawi. Buses travel from Mzuzu and Nkhata Bay to Karonga using the M1 road.
