= Conway Reef =

Atoll in Nadroga-Navosa Province, Fiji

Native name: Ceva-I-Ra
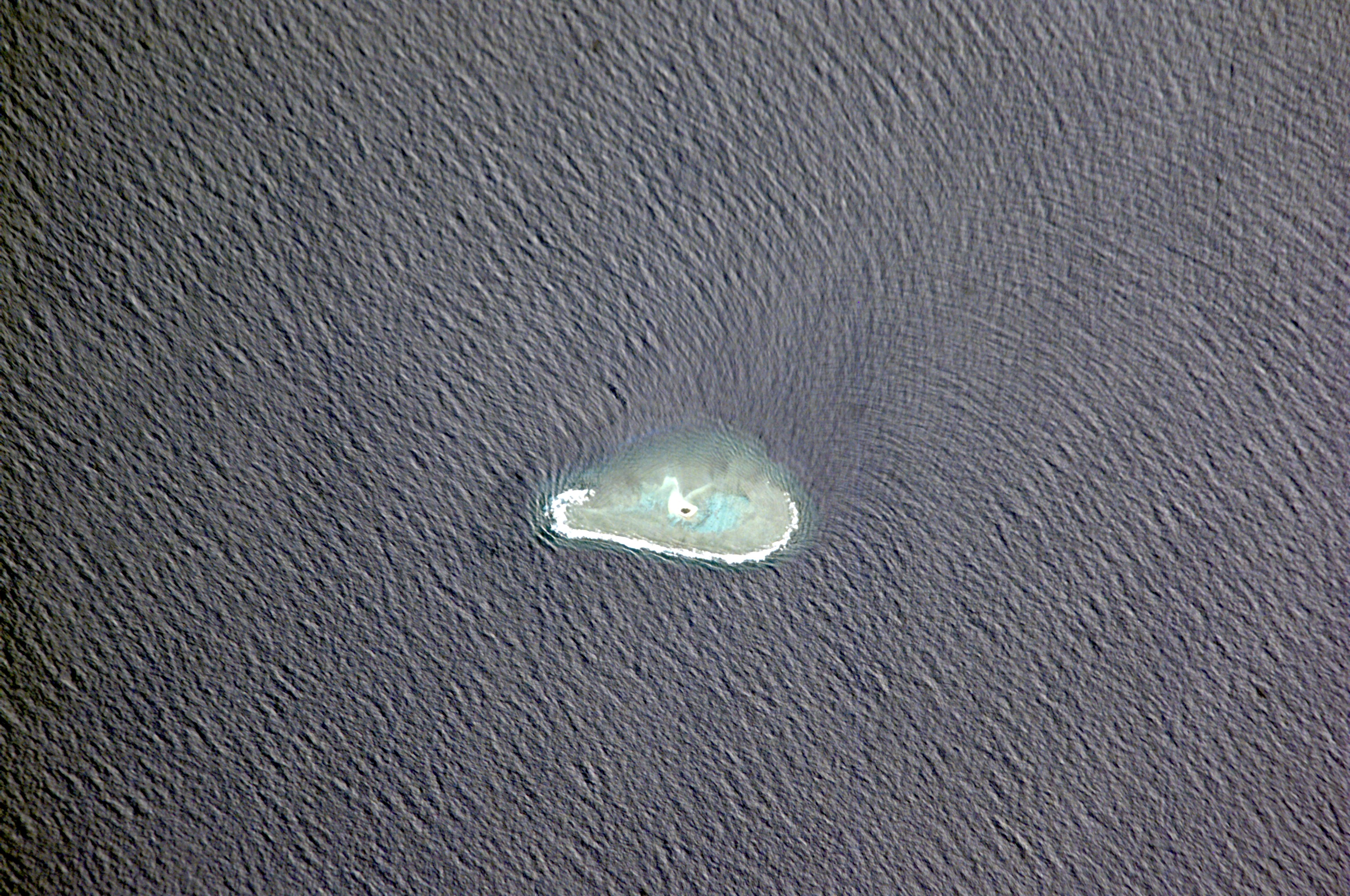
- Conway Reef, NASA ISS 002 Satellite Image

- Location within Fiji

Geography
- Location: South Pacific Ocean
- Coordinates: 21°44′18″S 174°38′24″E
- Area: 0.2 km^{2} (0.077 sq mi)
- Length: 2.5 km (1.55 mi)
- Highest elevation: 1.8 m (5.9 ft)

Administration
- Fiji
- Division: Western
- Province: Nadroga-Navosa

Demographics
- Population: 0

Conway Reef, known since 1976 by its Fijian name Ceva-I-Ra Reef (pronounced [ˈðeβaiˈra]), is a coral reef of the atoll type.

== Geography ==
It is 2.5 km (1.6 mi) long in an east–west direction. In the middle of the reef there is a small sand cay, 1.8 metres (5 feet 11 inches) high, about 320 metres (1,050 feet) long, and 73 metres (240 feet) metres wide, with a land area of two hectares. Politically, it is in the Western Division and the Nadroga-Navosa province of the Republic of Fiji. However, geographically, it lies 450 km (280 mi) south-west of the main complex of the Fiji Islands.

None of the other islands of Fiji are farther away from each other than 75 km (47 mi) (unless you count Rotuma Island, which is politically but not geographically part of Fiji).

The closest land to Conway Reef is Hunter Island in the French territory of New Caledonia. Hunter Island is also claimed by Vanuatu. It lies 275 km (171 mi) to the west-south-west (WSW) of Conway Reef.

== History ==
The reef was annexed by the United Kingdom in 1965, and incorporated into Fiji on independence.

In 1838, the Royal Navy Captain Drinkwater Bethune of HMS Conway first came across the reef and recorded it; it was first mapped by several years later by a British captain named Denham, commanding HMS Herald.

There were a couple of wrecks on the island in the 19th century: The brig Rapid, under Captain Arthur Devlin, ran aground on the reef at 0200 h on 14 January 1841, going at a speed of 7 knots with all its sails up: The crew member on lookout duty may not have been paying attention. And 14 years later, on the night of 26 January 1855, the ship Logan of New Bedford, under Captain Wells, was wrecked on Conway Reef (which he referred to as "Sandy Island Reef").

In 1964 a Japanese fishing vessel, Fuji Maru No. 2, was wrecked on the reef. There have been three recent shipwrecks on the reef (1979, 1981 and 2008), the latest one is the Chinese fishing vessel San Sheng No. 168. The wreck of that ship lies on the northeast end of the reef. The stranded wreck of a coastal trading vessel lies 240 metres south of the centre of the cay.

Access to the island should be attempted only at high tide, and only in a shallow draft tender. Extreme care must be taken to navigate the coral heads.

Conway Reef is uninhabited, apart from some birds that appear to have almost no fear of humans. It offers the rare opportunity to experience diving and snorkeling in a virtually untouched underwater environment.

In 1983 it was reported that there was some vegetation on the cay. In 1985 it was reportedly bare.

The island counts as a separate entity for DXCC credit in amateur radio. Several Dxpeditions visited it as 3D2C in September 2012, 3D2CR in June 2019 and September 2021. and 3D2CCC in April 2024.

== Tectonics ==
Its former name is given to the Conway Reef plate which is a tectonic microplate that extends on the sea bottom to the north of the reef. The Australian plate is subducting under the New Hebrides plate to produce an active seismic zone the Hunter fracture zone and in concert with propagating back-arc extension, a volcanic Hunter Ridge that extends from southern Vanuatu to the area of Ceva-I-Ra. The convergence becomes oblique by Ceva-I-Ra as the Hunter fracture zone extends towards the Kadavu Islands of Fiji.

== See also ==
- Uninhabited island
- Lists of islands
