= Geography of Fiji =

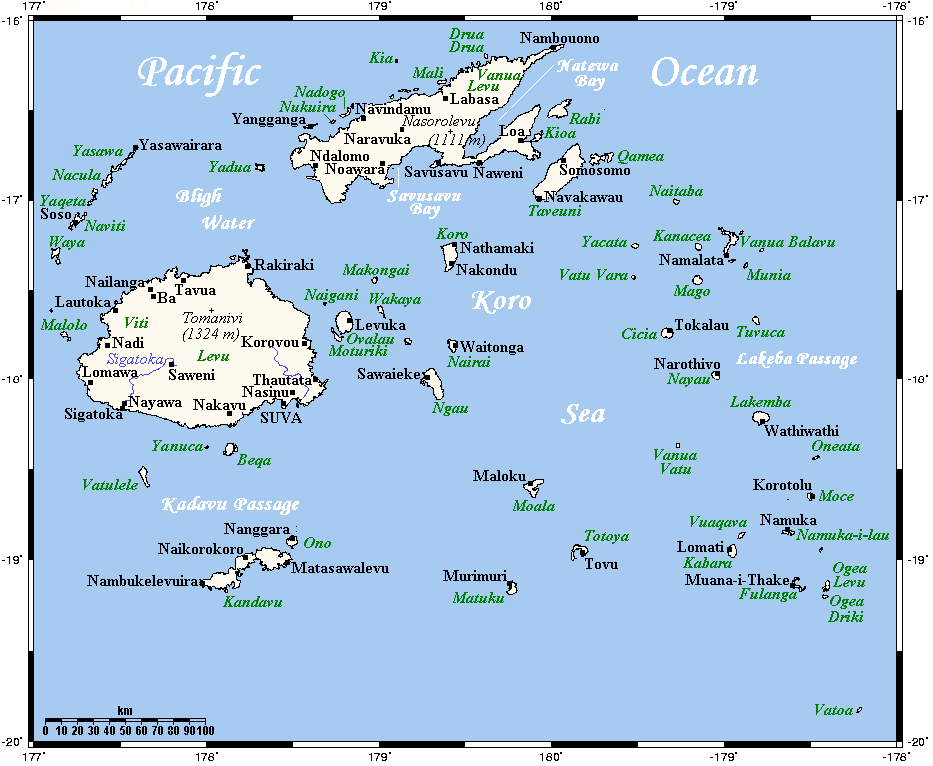
- Continent: Pacific Ocean
- Region: Oceania
- Coordinates: 18°00′S 179°00′E
- Area: Ranked 151st
  - Total: 18,272 km^{2} (7,055 sq mi)
  - Land: 100%
  - Water: 0%
- Coastline: 1,129 km (702 mi)
- Borders: None
- Highest point: Mount Tomanivi; 1,324 metres (4,344 ft)
- Lowest point: Pacific Ocean; 0 m
- Exclusive economic zone: 1,282,978 km^{2} (495,361 mi^{2})

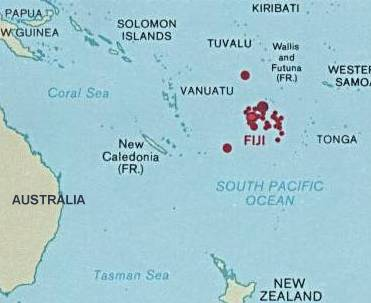
Fiji's location in Oceania

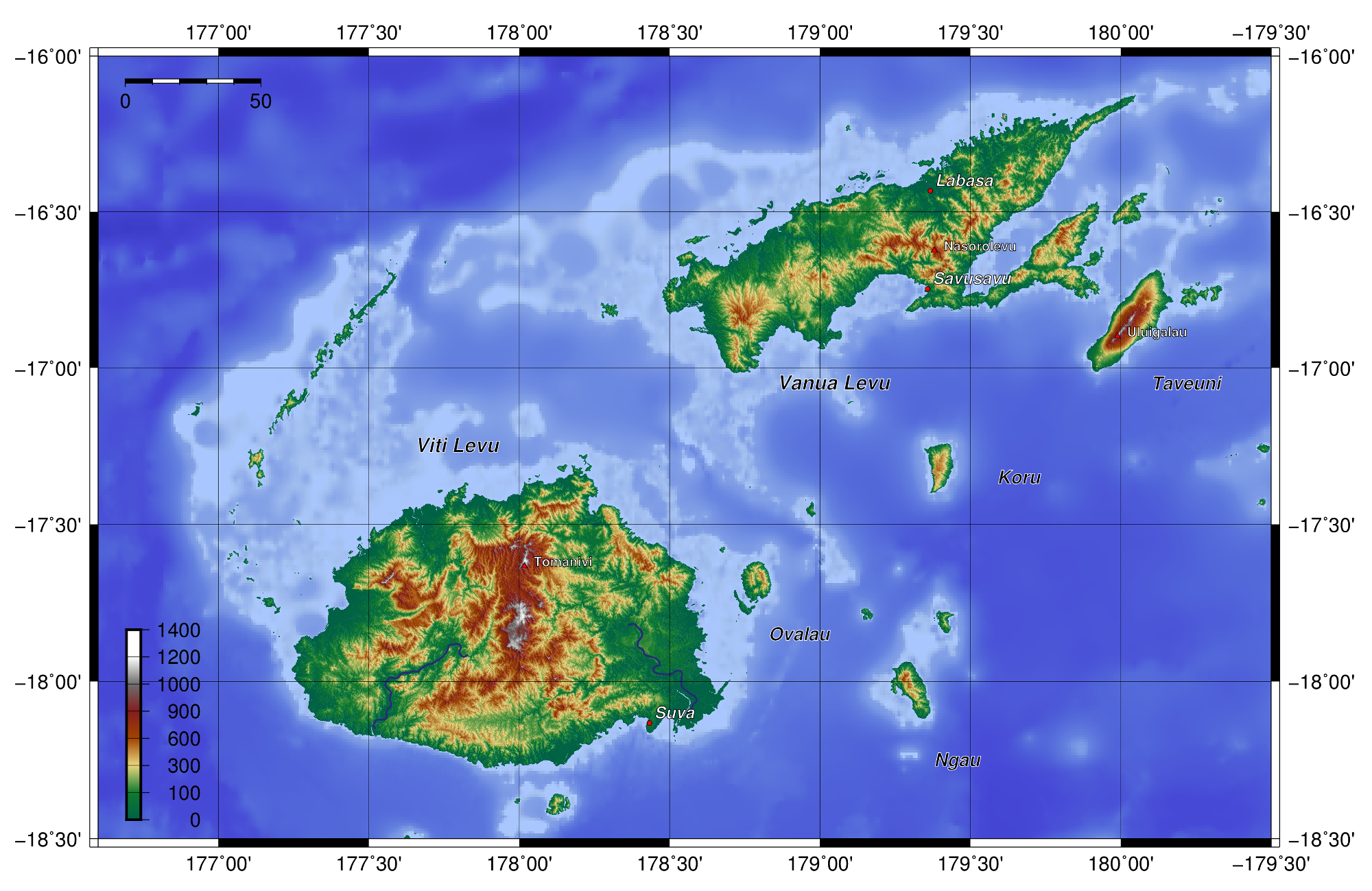
Topography of Fiji

Fiji is an Oceanian archipelago of volcanic islands with two main islands in the South Pacific, lying about 1,770 km (1,100 mi) north of New Zealand and 4,450 kilometres (2,765 mi) southwest of Honolulu, Hawaii. Of the 332 islands and 522 smaller islets making up the archipelago, about 106 are permanently inhabited. The total land size is 18,272 km^{2} (7,055 mi^{2}). It has the 26th largest Exclusive Economic Zone of 1,282,978 km^{2} (495,361 mi^{2}).

Viti Levu, the largest island, covers about 57% of the nation's land area, hosts the two official cities (the capital Suva, and Lautoka) and most other major towns, such as Nausori, Vaileka, Ba, Tavua, Kororvou, Nasinu, and Nadi (the site of the international airport), and contains some 69% of the population. Vanua Levu, 64 km (40 mi) to the northeast of Viti Levu, covers just over 30% of the land area though is home to only some 15% of the population. Its main towns are Labasa and Savusavu. In the northeast it features Natewa Bay, carving out the Loa peninsula.

Both islands are mountainous, with peaks up to 1,300 m (4,300 ft) rising abruptly from the shore, and covered with tropical forests. Heavy rains (up to 304 cm or 120 inches annually) fall on the windward (southeastern) side, covering these sections of the islands with dense tropical forest. Lowlands on the western portions of each of the main islands are sheltered by the mountains and have a well-marked dry season favorable to crops such as sugarcane.

Other islands and island groups, which cover just 12.5% of the land area and house some 16% of the population, include Taveuni southeast off Vanua Levu and Kadavu Island, south off Viti Levu (the third and fourth largest islands respectively), the Mamanuca Group (just off Nadi) and Yasawa Group (to the north of the Mamanucas), which are popular tourist destinations, the Lomaiviti Group (just off Suva) with Levuka, the former capital and the only major town on any of the smaller islands, located on the island of Ovalau, and the remote Lau Group over the Koro Sea to the east near Tonga, from which it is separated by the Lakeba Passage.

Two outlying regions are Rotuma, 400 km (250 mi) to the north, and the uninhabited coral atoll and cay Ceva-i-Ra or Conway Reef, 450 km (280 mi) to the southwest of main Fiji. Culturally conservative Rotuma with its 2,000 people on 44 km^{2} (17 sq mi) geographically belongs to Polynesia, and enjoys relative autonomy as a Fijian dependency.

Fiji Television reported on 21 September 2006 that the Fiji Islands Maritime and Safety Administration (FIMSA), while reviewing its outdated maritime charts, had discovered the possibility that more islands could lie within Fiji's Exclusive Economic Zone.

More than half of Fiji's population lives on the island coasts, either in Suva or in smaller urban centers. The interior is sparsely populated because of its rough terrain.

== Statistics ==
Location
Oceania, island group in the South Pacific Ocean; geographic coordinates:
18°00′S 179°00′E
Map references
Oceania
Area
- Total: 18,274 km^{2} (7,056 sq mi)
- Land: 18,274 km^{2} (7,056 sq mi)
- Water: 0 km^{2} (0 sq mi)
Area – comparative
Slightly smaller than New Jersey; slightly less than one third Nova Scotia's size; slightly smaller than Wales
Land boundaries
0 km (0 mi)
Coastline
1,120 km (700 mi)
Maritime claims
- Measured from claimed archipelagic baselines
- Territorial sea: 12 nautical miles (22 km; 14 mi)
- Exclusive economic zone: 1,282,978 km^{2} (495,361 mi^{2}). 200 nmi (370 km; 230 mi)
- Continental shelf: 200 m (660 ft) depth or to the depth of exploitation; rectilinear shelf claim added
Terrain
- Mostly mountains of volcanic origin, beaches
- A recent global remote sensing analysis suggested that there were 438 km^{2} of tidal flats in Fiji, making it the 49th ranked country in terms of tidal flat area.
Elevation extremes
- Lowest point: Pacific Ocean 0 km (0 mi)
- Highest point: Mount Tomanivi 1,324 metres (4,344 ft)
Natural resources
Timber, fish, gold, copper, offshore oil potential, hydropower
Land use
- Arable land: 9.03%
- Permanent crops: 4.65%
- Other: 86.32% (2011)
Irrigated land
30 km^{2} (12 sq mi) (2003)
Total renewable water resources
28.55 km^{3} (6.85 cu mi) (2011)
Freshwater withdrawal (domestic/industrial/agricultural)
- total: 0.08 km^{3}/a (0.019 cu mi/a) (30%/11%/59%)
- per capita: 100.1 m^{3}/a (130.9 cu yd/a) (2005)
Natural hazards
Cyclonic storms can occur from November to January
Environment – current issues
Deforestation; soil erosion
Environment – international agreements
- Party to: biodiversity, climate change-Kyoto Protocol, desertification, endangered species, law of the sea, marine life conservation, ozone layer protection, Tropical Timber 83, Tropical Timber 94, wetlands
- Signed, but not ratified: None of the selected agreements
Geography – note
Includes 322 islands and islets of which approximately 110 are inhabited

== Climate ==
Fiji has a tropical rainforest climate and a tropical monsoon climate (Af and Am according to the Köppen climate classification). Suva, the capital city, receives more rainfall than Nadi or the other side of Viti Levu. El Niño and La Niña events have significant impacts on rainfall. Tropical cyclones can impact Fiji and in some cases they can cause severe damage and many deaths. In 2016, Cyclone Winston caused widespread destruction and affected hundreds of thousands of people after striking Fiji. A few years later, Cyclone Harold also caused widespread damage.

Climate change in Fiji is an exceptionally pressing issue for the country – as an island nation, Fiji is particularly vulnerable to rising sea levels, coastal erosion and extreme weather. These changes, along with temperature rise, will displace Fijian communities and will prove disruptive to the national economy – tourism, agriculture and fisheries, the largest contributors to the nation's GDP, will be severely impacted by climate change causing increases in poverty and food insecurity. As a party to both the Kyoto Protocol and the Paris Climate Agreement, Fiji hopes to achieve net-zero emissions by 2050 which, along with national policies, will help to mitigate the impacts of climate change.

Climate data for Suva (Köppen Af)
Month	Jan	Feb	Mar	Apr	May	Jun	Jul	Aug	Sep	Oct	Nov	Dec	Year
Record high °C (°F)	35.0 (95.0)	36.0 (96.8)	37.0 (98.6)	34.0 (93.2)	34.0 (93.2)	32.0 (89.6)	32.0 (89.6)	32.0 (89.6)	32.0 (89.6)	34.0 (93.2)	34.0 (93.2)	36.0 (96.8)	37.0 (98.6)
Mean daily maximum °C (°F)	30.8 (87.4)	31.2 (88.2)	30.9 (87.6)	29.9 (85.8)	28.5 (83.3)	27.7 (81.9)	26.8 (80.2)	26.7 (80.1)	27.2 (81.0)	28.2 (82.8)	29.3 (84.7)	30.3 (86.5)	28.9 (84.0)
Daily mean °C (°F)	27.4 (81.3)	27.6 (81.7)	26.4 (79.5)	26.6 (79.9)	25.4 (77.7)	24.6 (76.3)	23.8 (74.8)	23.7 (74.7)	24.1 (75.4)	25.1 (77.2)	26.1 (79.0)	26.9 (80.4)	25.6 (78.2)
Mean daily minimum °C (°F)	23.9 (75.0)	24.0 (75.2)	23.9 (75.0)	23.3 (73.9)	22.2 (72.0)	21.4 (70.5)	20.7 (69.3)	20.7 (69.3)	21.0 (69.8)	21.9 (71.4)	22.8 (73.0)	23.5 (74.3)	22.4 (72.3)
Record low °C (°F)	19.0 (66.2)	19.0 (66.2)	19.0 (66.2)	16.0 (60.8)	16.0 (60.8)	14.0 (57.2)	13.0 (55.4)	14.0 (57.2)	14.0 (57.2)	14.0 (57.2)	13.0 (55.4)	17.0 (62.6)	13.0 (55.4)
Average rainfall mm (inches)	371 (14.6)	265 (10.4)	374 (14.7)	366 (14.4)	270 (10.6)	163 (6.4)	136 (5.4)	158 (6.2)	177 (7.0)	221 (8.7)	245 (9.6)	277 (10.9)	3,023 (119.0)
Average precipitation days	23	22	24	23	21	18	19	18	17	19	19	22	245
Source: http://www.met.gov.fj/ClimateofFiji.pdf

Climate data for Nadi (Köppen Am)
Month	Jan	Feb	Mar	Apr	May	Jun	Jul	Aug	Sep	Oct	Nov	Dec	Year
Record high °C (°F)	36.7 (98.1)	35.4 (95.7)	35.0 (95.0)	34.3 (93.7)	33.9 (93.0)	33.5 (92.3)	32.9 (91.2)	34.3 (93.7)	34.0 (93.2)	34.6 (94.3)	36.3 (97.3)	35.9 (96.6)	36.7 (98.1)
Mean daily maximum °C (°F)	31.6 (88.9)	31.5 (88.7)	31.1 (88.0)	30.7 (87.3)	29.7 (85.5)	29.2 (84.6)	28.5 (83.3)	28.7 (83.7)	29.4 (84.9)	30.2 (86.4)	30.9 (87.6)	31.4 (88.5)	30.2 (86.4)
Daily mean °C (°F)	27.1 (80.8)	27.2 (81.0)	26.9 (80.4)	26.2 (79.2)	24.9 (76.8)	24.2 (75.6)	23.4 (74.1)	23.6 (74.5)	24.4 (75.9)	25.3 (77.5)	26.2 (79.2)	26.7 (80.1)	25.5 (77.9)
Mean daily minimum °C (°F)	22.7 (72.9)	22.9 (73.2)	22.6 (72.7)	21.7 (71.1)	20.1 (68.2)	19.3 (66.7)	18.3 (64.9)	18.4 (65.1)	19.3 (66.7)	20.4 (68.7)	21.5 (70.7)	22.1 (71.8)	20.8 (69.4)
Record low °C (°F)	19.0 (66.2)	18.3 (64.9)	17.7 (63.9)	16.2 (61.2)	14.0 (57.2)	13.6 (56.5)	11.7 (53.1)	11.3 (52.3)	13.3 (55.9)	14.4 (57.9)	15.1 (59.2)	17.2 (63.0)	11.3 (52.3)
Average rainfall mm (inches)	300 (11.8)	303 (11.9)	324 (12.8)	173 (6.8)	80 (3.1)	62 (2.4)	47 (1.9)	59 (2.3)	77 (3.0)	103 (4.1)	139 (5.5)	159 (6.3)	1,826 (71.9)
Average rainy days (≥ 1.0 mm)	14	15	16	9	6	5	4	4	5	7	9	11	105
Average relative humidity (%)	81	82	84	82	80	79	76	75	74	75	76	78	78
Mean monthly sunshine hours	213.5	182.4	190.1	197.8	212.0	206.0	218.1	231.0	214.6	226.6	221.5	225.4	2,539
Source 1: NOAA
Source 2: Deutscher Wetterdienst (precipitation days, 1968–1990 and humidity, 1962–1990)

== Tectonics ==
Fiji is located on the northeast corner of the Indo-Australian plate near where it subducts under the Pacific plate on the North Fiji Basin microplate between the North Fiji Fracture Zone on the north and the Hunter fracture zone on the south. It is part of the Ring of Fire, the string of volcanoes around the boundary of the Pacific Ocean.

== Extreme points ==
This is a list of the extreme points of Fiji, the points that are farther north, south, east or west than any other location.

- Northernmost point – Uea Island, Rotuma, Eastern Division
- Easternmost point – Vatoa Island, Eastern Division
- Southernmost point – Ceva-i-Ra island, Western Division
- Westernmost point – Viwa Island, Western Division

== Ecology ==
Fiji has more than three hundred islands, four of which are of a significant size. From largest to smallest, these four islands are Viti Levu, Vanua Levu, Kadavu Island, and Taveuni Island. The Fiji islands are home to numerous indigenous flora and fauna. These include:

- Fiji banded iguana
- Fiji crested iguana
- Many-colored fruit dove

Fiji once hosted several now-extinct Pleistocene and Holocene species, including a large crocodilian of the genus Volia, which was likely the apex predator of its environment. Other notable extinct species include Lapitiguana impensa, a giant iguana, as well as the flightless Viti Levu giant pigeon.

=== Tree cover extent and loss ===
Global Forest Watch publishes annual estimates of tree cover loss and 2000 tree cover extent derived from time-series analysis of Landsat satellite imagery in the Global Forest Change dataset. In this framework, tree cover refers to vegetation taller than 5 m (including natural forests and tree plantations), and tree cover loss is defined as the complete removal of tree cover canopy for a given year, regardless of cause.

For Fiji, country statistics report cumulative tree cover loss of 54,074 ha (540.74 km^{2}) from 2001 to 2024 (about 3.5% of its 2000 tree cover area). For tree cover density greater than 30%, country statistics report a 2000 tree cover extent of 1,556,562 ha (15,565.62 km^{2}). The charts and table below display this data. In simple terms, the annual loss number is the area where tree cover disappeared in that year, and the extent number shows what remains of the 2000 tree cover baseline after subtracting cumulative loss. Forest regrowth is not included in the dataset.

Annual tree cover loss in Fiji, 2001–2024. View chart definition.
Tree cover extent in 2000 minus cumulative tree cover loss in Fiji, 2001–2024 (loss-only residual; does not account for gain). View chart definition.

Annual tree cover extent and loss
Year	Tree cover extent (km2) (Note: This residual measure does not include forest regrowth.)	Annual tree cover loss (km2)
2001	15,554.64	10.98
2002	15,547.61	7.03
2003	15,531.89	15.72
2004	15,511.09	20.80
2005	15,494.43	16.66
2006	15,475.68	18.75
2007	15,454.20	21.48
2008	15,430.33	23.87
2009	15,412.42	17.91
2010	15,388.95	23.47
2011	15,383.43	5.52
2012	15,371.23	12.20
2013	15,344.24	26.99
2014	15,307.36	36.88
2015	15,288.98	18.38
2016	15,205.25	83.73
2017	15,174.33	30.92
2018	15,160.66	13.67
2019	15,146.11	14.55
2020	15,125.44	20.67
2021	15,053.45	71.99
2022	15,043.56	9.89
2023	15,035.68	7.88
2024	15,024.88	10.80
