= Hunter Ridge =

Oceanic ridge in the south-west Pacific Ocean south of Vanautu

- Stratigraphic range: 7–0 Ma
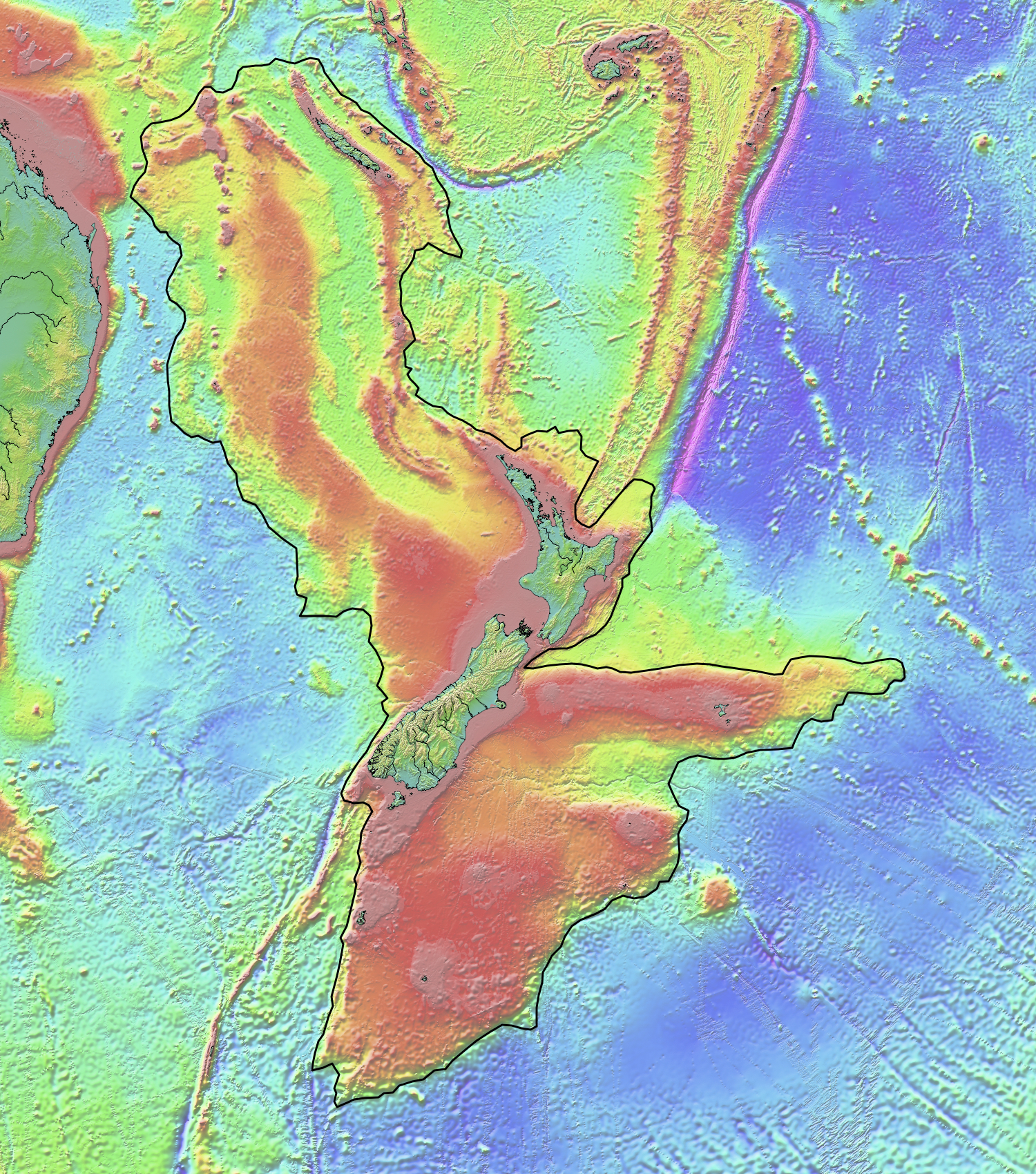
- Geographical and geological relationships of the Hunter Ridge and the related Hunter fracture zone. Zealandia is outlined in black.
- Type: Igneous

Lithology
- Other: Underlying diverse subduction and other rocks

Location
- Coordinates: 21.5°S 174.5°W
- Region: South Pacific
- Country: Vanuatu

Type section
- Named for: Hunter Island
- Approximate surface projection on Pacific Ocean of the Hunter Ridge '"`UNIQ--templatestyles-00000003-QINU`"' (brown).

The Hunter Ridge (previously known as Hunter Island Ridge, Matthew Ridge), is an active volcanic arc oceanic ridge located on the oceanic New Hebrides plate in the south-west Pacific Ocean extending at least 550 km (340 mi). It defines the south-western limit of the North Fiji Basin (NFB) and is an area of unique range in volcanic geochemistry, which transpires to have been due partially to a new, previously unrecognised, subduction zone.

== Geography ==
The ridge contains Matthew Island and Hunter Island and extends from southern Vanuatu near the Volsmar seamount via the region of Ceva-i-Ra (Conway Reef) towards Fiji. Its length on this definition is about 550 km (340 mi) but earlier work included other parts of the Hunter fracture zone that are now known to be discontinuous topographically and on such historic definitions the length approached 1,000 km (620 mi) or more. The West Matthew volcano had its the most recent eruption in 1956, still had steam admissions in 1983, having formed a new volcanic cone from below the sea surface in the last 80 years. Hunter Island last erupted in 1903.

=== Geology ===
The Matthew and Hunter islands have unusual high-Mg andesitic to dacitic and boninite lavas. These unusual lavas have also been found from a number of seamounts at the southern regions of the Vanuatu subduction zone. Historic classifications have included mid-ocean ridge basalts (MORB) and enriched mid-ocean ridge basalts (E-MORB). Igneous rocks with primitive to evolved compositions including calc-alkaline, arc tholeiites and low-Ti island arc tholeiites have also been dredged from the Hunter Ridge area. The sampled lavas are less than a million years old and suggest magma generation involves contributions from adakitic, sediment and back arc-basin basalt (BABB) melt components. An analogy has been noted with the adakitic andesites on the Solander Islands in another very young subduction system related to the Puysegur Trench south of New Zealand. However the composition of the most recent Hunter Ridge eruptives is more similar to that of the western Aleutians.

=== Tectonics ===
The Australian plate is subducting under the New Hebrides plate to produce an active seismic zone and in concert with propagating back-arc extension, the volcanism of the ridge. The convergence becomes oblique so the eastern end of the ridge becomes part of the Hunter fracture zone that extends towards the Kadavu Islands. Currently the eastern Hunter Ridge is being pulled apart at the current triple junction between the New Hebrides Trench, the southernmost propagating tip of the Central Spreading Ridge backarc-spreading centre at the intersection of the New Hebrides plate and Conway Reef plate under the NFB, and the Hunter fracture zone.

From 12 to 3 million years ago after the subduction polarity reversal likely caused by the collision of the Pacific plate Ontong Java Plateau with the Vitiaz Trench subduction zone, the NFB opened as a series of spreading centres and complex transform fault systems that formed due to clockwise rollback of the subducted Indo-Australian plate as it then was. There was rapid extension in the NFB with clockwise rotation of the Vanuatu subduction zone and the counter clockwise rotation of the Fiji area. During the last 4 million years of this period, the opening of the NFB in a north–south direction, allowed northward subduction of the South Fiji Basin part of the Indo-Australian plate under the NFB forming the initial Hunter Ridge.

At 3 million years ago were events that lead to formation of the present Australian plate and the major opening of the NFB shifted to its present-day east–west direction along the north–south-oriented Central Spreading Ridge. The northward subduction of the South Fiji Basin stopped and the Hunter fracture zone developed as a transform fault. The propagation of the spreading center in the NFB southward has resulted in the Hunter Ridge being rifted into two parallel segments separated by a volcanically still active rift zone that has been called the Hunter Ridge Rift Zone, or Monzier Rift. Here primitive submarine lavas have erupted through thin oceanic crust in what is a new subduction zone, that is only 2 million years old. This subduction zone has been named the Matthew and Hunter subduction system, or Matthew and Hunter subduction zone, where previous work had considered it the southern termination of the New Hebrides subduction zone. Volcanism is much closer to the trench compared to previously well characterised subduction zones which is postulated to be due to the zone being an immature subduction system at a stage before classic arc subduction volcanism.

== See also ==
- Vanuatu subduction zone
