= Vanuatu subduction zone =

Subduction zone under South Pacific Ocean

- New Hebrides subduction zone
- Approximate surface projection on Pacific Ocean of some tectonic features near Vanuatu subduction zone (center map). The New Britain subduction zone to the north is also shown. Key: Up to 70 km (43 mi) deep shallow-focus earthquakes 70–300 km (43–186 mi) deep shallow-focus earthquakes More than 300 km (190 mi) deep shallow-focus earthquakes (blue) Active subduction trenches (light blue) Inactive trenches (brown) Selected oceanic floor ridges (yellow) Spreading centers or rifts Volcanoes and tectonic plate boundaries where they are transform faults are not shown. Mouse over shows feature names.
- Etymology: Vanuatu

Tectonics
- Plate: Australian, New Hebrides
- Status: Active
- Earthquakes: Up to M_{w} 8.2
- Age: Miocene-current

The Vanuatu subduction zone (previously called New Hebrides subduction zone) is currently one of the most active subduction zones on Earth, producing great earthquakes (magnitude 8.0 or greater), with potential for tsunami hazard to all coastlines of the Pacific Ocean. There are active volcanoes associated with arc volcanism.

== Geography ==
The zone includes most of the islands of Vanuatu, the Santa Cruz islands of the southern Solomon Islands, and the Loyalty Islands. A number of ocean floor features are related to the zone, in particular the New Hebrides Trench (South New Hebridies Trench) and the North New Hebrides Trench (Torres Trench) which is separated from the southern trench by the d'Entrecasteaux Ridge and the island of Espiritu Santo. The d'Entrecasteaux Ridge is at this point of intersection two parallel, east–west trending ridges that are 1 to 2 km (0.62 to 1.24 mi) above the surrounding abyssal plain.

== Geology ==
Shore based observations had characterised the islands of the volcanic arc as having typical lavas and being of early Miocene or younger in age. More recently marine surveys have supplemented this limited sampling. Reef terraces mantle on Espiritu Santo and Malekula show rapid late Quaternary terrace uplift of between 0.2 to 0.6 cm/year (0.079 to 0.236 in/year). It is known that the Torres Islands to the north west have had less uplift recently.

Off shore in the north it is known that the subducting plate has up to 1 km (0.62 mi) of sediments.

The basalts of the d'Entrecasteaux Ridge, that are being subducted, are known to be between 56 and 21 million years old. This material is lighter than the other subducted zone material except for West Torres Plateau material and this property is believed to be a factor in distortions of the island arc chain at these subduction points. The rest of the oceanic basalt crust of the Australian plate that is being subducted otherwise is Eocene in age. Beyond the Vanuata arc itself the bedrock of the North Fiji Basin is related to arc spreading centres, and some of the oceanic basalt is of recent origin.

There is classic arc andersite volcanism formed from calc-alkaline magma, in most of Vanuatu, but to the south where volcanoes are active in the Hunter Ridge the sampled lavas suggest magma generation involves contributions from adakitic, sediment and back arc-basin basalt (BABB) melt components.

=== Tectonics ===
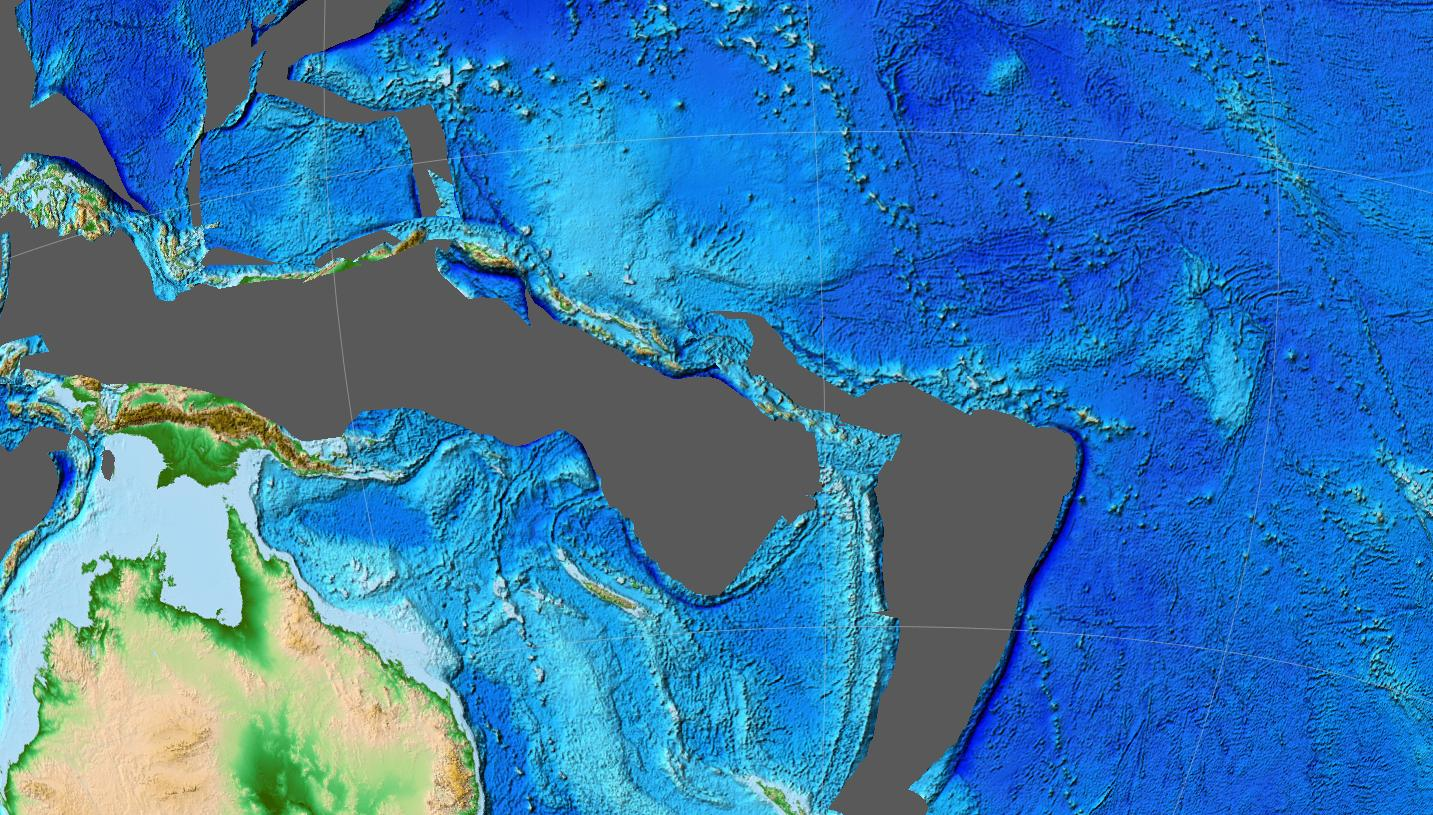
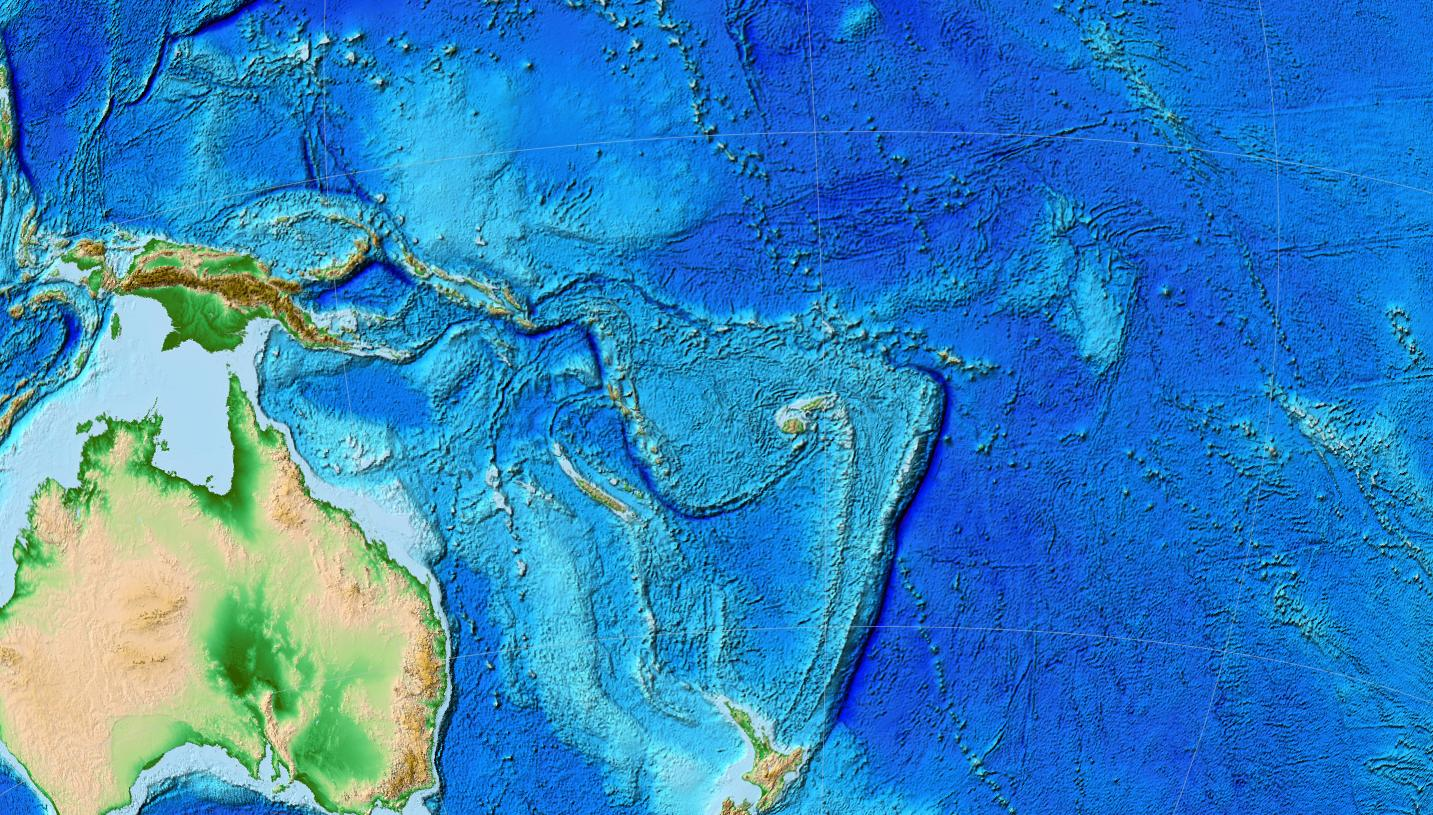
Change in 12 million years to the present of south west Pacific region. At 12 Ma (top) what will become the Vanuata arc of islands is oriented east west with Fiji and the western Solomon Islands as the North Fiji Basin is yet to form. Grey areas represent now subducted ocean floor (disappeared in bottom picture).

The zone defines the plate boundary between the New Hebrides microplate, which is related to the Pacific plate, and the Australian plate. Ten million years ago the Vanuatu island chain had an almost east west orientation with Fiji and the spreading centers of the North Fiji Basin have created both the current separation and quite different orientation. The convergence rate in the subduction zone has a high rate of 170 mm (6.7 in)/year in the north at about latitude 11°S in the Solomon Island region, north of the Torres. Where the d'Entrecasteaux Ridge is being subducted in the central section the convergence rate reduces to 40 mm (1.6 in)/year before increasing again to 120 mm (4.7 in)/year in the New Hebrides Trench east of the Loyalty Islands. However at the d'Entrecasteaux Ridge and Espiritu Santo central section there is localized compression of 50 mm (2.0 in)/year in the volcanic back arc to compensate. The ridge may have been subducting for up to the last two million years.

Like the northern parts of the zone the southern subduction of the NW–SE trending Loyalty Ridge on the Australian plate under the southern Vanuatu microplates produces much earthquake activity.

There has been asymmetric back-arc opening beyond the subduction zone in the North Fiji Basin and over the last 6 million years the Vanuatu chain has rotated about 28° clockwise. There are two tectonic blocks related to Vanuatu in the basin separated by an extensional zone east of the island chain.

The characteristics of the current active northward subduction of the South Fiji Basin under the New Hebrides plate seems sufficiently different to the more northern subduction zone for some workers to have a different name and this region has been called the Matthew and Hunter subduction system, or Matthew and Hunter subduction zone.

To the south subduction ceases at the triple junction with the Conway Reef microplate under the North Fiji Basin with the rest of the convergence being accommodated by less tectonically active rifting in the western stretch of the New Hebrides Trench, the Hunter Ridge to its north and the Hunter fracture zone which is a transform faulting fracture zone continuation of the trench towards Fiji. This triple junction is where from 3 million years ago the southernmost Central Spreading Ridge of the North Fiji Basin propagated southward and has now intersected with the New Hebrides Trench and the Hunter fracture zone.

The progressive subduction/collision of the NW–SE trending Loyalty Ridge located on the Australian plate under the southern Vanuatu microplates produces much earthquake activity but the most southernmost part of the trench south of latitude 22.5° S and east of longitude 170° E is not highly tectonically active and translates into the non subducting Hunter fracture zone which is a transform faulting fracture zone.

=== Seismicity ===
Approximate surface projection on Pacific Ocean of tectonic earthquakes near Vanuatu subduction zone and North Fiji Basin. Key is as for other map on this page. Active transform faults are not shown. Mouse over shows feature names.

The subduction zone must have had many significant earthquakes but was isolated from historical records until the last 19th century. Even then the tsunami risk of these earthquakes to distant coastlines was not appreciated as most such earthquakes do not cause significant disruption of the sea floor. The shallow and deep earthquakes associated with subduction of the Australian plate slab are confined to an area about 150 km (93 mi) wide. There are however other tectonic earthquakes associated with local plate boundaries nearby, as the North Fiji Basin has both spreading centres and fault zones and the most active parts are shown on a map on this page.

Earthquake "doublet"s have been well described in the zone and an example of two earthquakes greater than M_{w} 7.7 occurred within 15 minutes of each other in the northern part of the zone on 7 October 2009.

Strike slip earthquakes can occur associated with the subduction of the D'Entrecasteaux ridge.

The seismicity of the area of the southern part of the subduction zone between the latitudes 21.5 and 22.5° S and the longitudes 169 and 170° E is high. There have been multiple earthquakes including swarms of magnitude M_{w} 7.0 or more impacting on New Caledonia and Vanuatu. The strain accumulation is regularly partially released through moderate to strong earthquakes during sequences which have included both interplate thrust faulting earthquakes and outer rise normal faulting earthquakes west and south-west of the trench.

The M_{w} 7.7 2021 Loyalty Islands earthquake (Matthew Island earthquake) was much stronger than the usual seismicity on the southernmost aspects of the New Hebrides Trench. The epicenter was close to Matthew Island, to the north of the trench and was both preceded and followed by a seismic crisis of multiple events with greater than M_{w} 5.0

The table below shows only historic earthquakes greater than M_{w} 7.5. Other significant earthquakes may be found in the list of earthquakes in Vanuatu, list of earthquakes in the Solomon Islands archipelago and New Hebrides Trench articles.

Earthquakes greater than M_{w} 7.5 in Vanuatu subduction zone
Date	Location	Magnitude (M_{w})	Depth	Notes
28 March 1875	Loyalty Islands	8.1–8.2	―	
9 August 1901	Tadine, New Caledonia	7.9	―	
16 June 1910	28 km (17 mi) ESE of Isangel, Vanuatu	7.8	100 km (62 mi)	
20 September 1920	97 km (60 mi) WSW of Isangel, Vanuatu	7.9	25 km (16 mi)	
16 March 1928	274 km (170 mi) ESE of Tadine, New Caledonia	7.6	10 km (6.2 mi)	
18 July 1934	138 km (86 mi) SSE of Lata, Solomon Islands	7.7	10 km (6.2 mi)	
2 December 1950	99 km (62 mi) SW of Port-Vila, Vanuatu	7.9	30 km (19 mi)	
17 December 1957	186 km (116 mi) NNW of Sola, Vanuatu	7.8	123.6 km (76.8 mi)	
12 May 1965	52 km (32 mi) ENE of Port-Olry, Vanuatu	7.7	120 km (75 mi)	
11 August 1965	38 km (24 mi) SSW of Port-Olry, Vanuatu	7.6	30 km (19 mi)	
31 December 1966	172 km (107 mi) SSE of Lata, Solomon Islands	7.8	55 km (34 mi)	
28 December 1973	81 km (50 mi) NW of Port-Olry, Vanuatu	7.5	26 km (16 mi)	
8 July 1980	196 km (122 mi) SEE of Lata, Solomon Islands	7.5	33 km (21 mi)	
17 July 1980	199 km (124 mi) S of Lata, Solomon Islands	7.9	33 km (21 mi)	
16 May 1995	249 km (155 mi) E of Vao, New Caledona	7.7	33 km (21 mi)	
21 April 1997	171 km (106 mi) NNW of Sola, Vanuatu	7.7	33 km (21 mi)	
4 January 1998	SE of Loyalty Islands	7.5	100.6 km (62.5 mi)	
26 November 1999	92 km (57 mi) ESE of Lakatoro, Vanuatu	7.5	33 km (21 mi)	
7 October 2009	148 km (92 mi) NW of Sola, Vanuatu	7.7	45 km (28 mi)	2009 Vanuatu earthquakes
7 October 2009	196 km (122 mi) NW of Sola, Vanuatu	7.8	35 km (22 mi)	2009 Vanuatu earthquakes
6 February 2013	75 km (47 mi) W of Lata, Solomon Islands	8.0	24 km (15 mi)	2013 Solomon Islands earthquake
5 December 2018	116 km (72 mi) ESE of Tadine, New Caledona	7.5	10 km (6.2 mi)	Characterised as normal faulting
10 February 2021	SE of Loyalty Islands	7.7	10 km (6.2 mi)	2021 Loyalty Islands earthquake
19 May 2023	339 km (211 mi) E of Isle of Pines, Loyalty Islands	7.7	18.1 km (11.2 mi)	Characterised as normal faulting

=== Tsunami hazard ===
The tsunami resulting from the 2013 Solomon Islands earthquake was 1.5 m (4 ft 11 in) high at the town of Lata on Nendö in the Santa Cruz Islands and resulted in ten deaths. It was modelled as a megathrust event having produced over 3 m (9.8 ft) of seafloor displacement but its position allowed attenuation by the Gilbert Islands of the wave that reached Hawaii. However modelling of the smaller tsunami that resulted from the M_{w} 7.7 2021 Loyalty Islands earthquake showed that other sea floor features could channel the tsunami from a larger M_{w} 8.2 earthquake at the same location north south, resulting in potential waves 1.5 m (4 ft 11 in) high at Norfolk Island and 1 m (3 ft 3 in)high on the West Coast of New Zealand.

=== Volcanism ===
Map of nearby current volcanic activity including arc volcanism in the east of the Vanuatu subduction zone. Spreading centers in the back arc North Fiji Basin are shown as red lines.

There is current active arc volcanism. For example Mount Yasur a stratovolcano has been erupting almost continuously since at least 1774 and erupted in the first 6 months of 2023. So did Epi and Ambae, which is Vanuatu's most voluminous active volcano. In 2022 Ambrym and the Gaua volcanoes erupted. The active volcanism of Matthew Island and Hunter Island to the south is not quite classic arc volcanism due to the complex tectonics in this south eastern portion of the zone.
