= New Hebrides Trench =

Oceanic trench in the southern Pacific Ocean

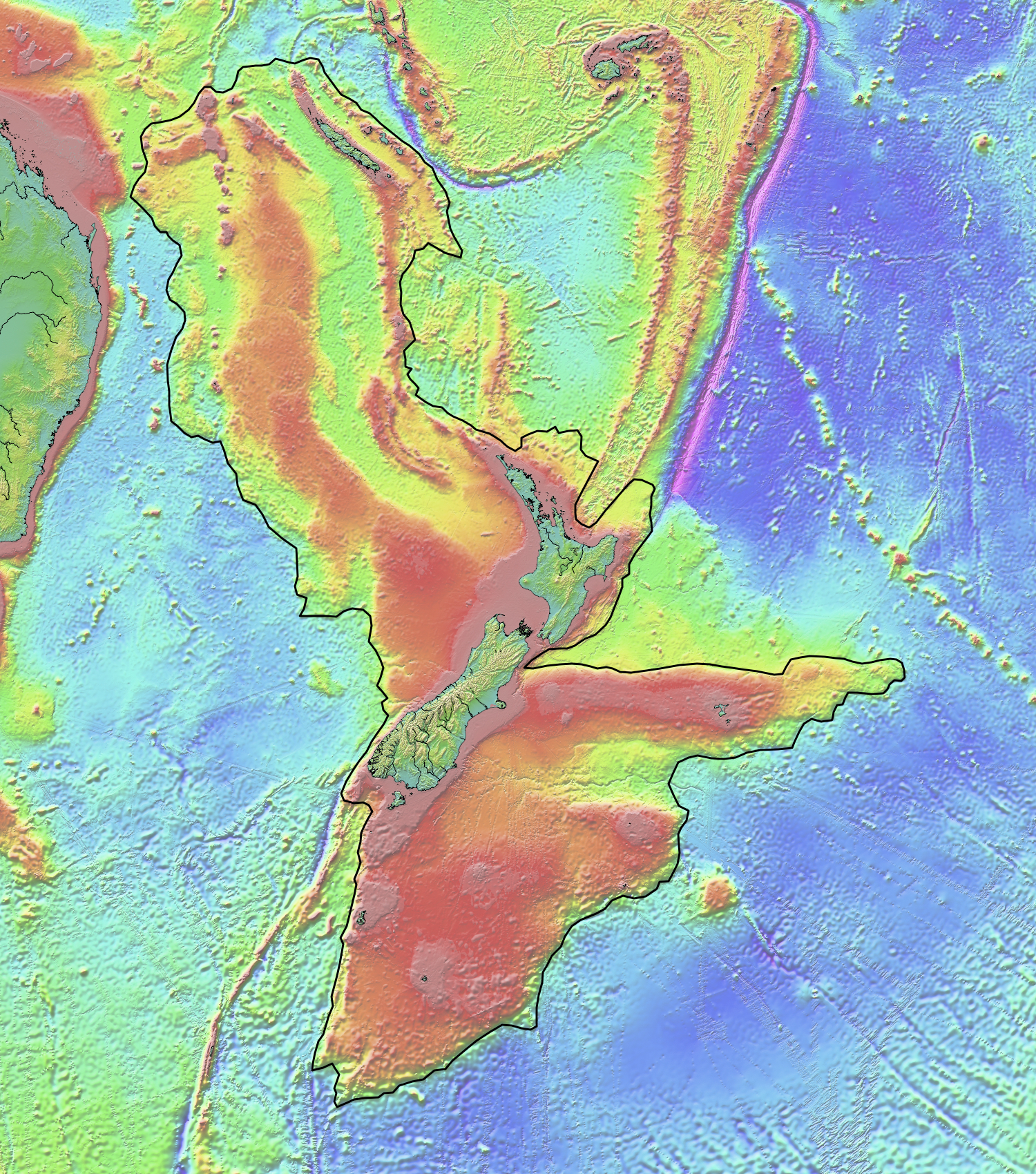
Geographical and geological relationships of the New Hebrides Trench in the central and southern Vanuatu subduction zone. Subduction is towards the north east and this map does not show the North New Hebrides (Torres) Trench. Zealandia is outlined in black.

Approximate surface projection on Pacific Ocean of New Hebrides Trench (dark blue).

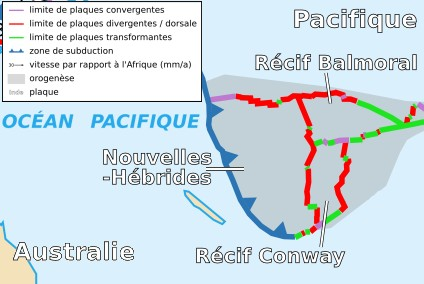
Map of the New Hebrides Trench and surrounding tectonic plates

The New Hebrides Trench (perhaps better termed the South New Hebrides Trench) is an oceanic trench which is over 7.1 km (4.4 mi) deep in the Southern Pacific Ocean. It lies to the northeast of New Caledonia and the Loyalty Islands, to the southwest of Vanuatu (formerly known as the New Hebrides), east of Australia, and south of Papua New Guinea and the Solomon Islands. The trench was formed as a result of a subduction zone. The Australian plate is being subducted under the New Hebrides plate causing volcanism which produced the Vanuatu archipelago.

The trench was first described in 1962 by the U.S. research vessel "Spencer F. Baird", in the Scripps Institution of Oceanography Proa Expedition and was explored in more detail in 2013 by the University of Aberdeen's Oceanlab team. They found cusk-eels, prawns, and other eels, and crustaceans. This is significantly different from other deep sea trenches that have been studied.

== Geography ==
The southern New Hebrides Trench is defined as extending from 17°45′00″S 167°20′00″E to 23°08′00″S 174°10′00″E. The North New Hebrides Trench (Torres Trench) that extends to the west of the Solomon Islands is a separate marine feature to the southern New Hebrides Trench due to the d'Entrecasteaux Ridge, even though they are tectonically part of the same subduction zone.

== Tectonics ==
At the New Hebrides Trench, the Australian plate is being subducted underneath the New Hebrides microplate in the Vanuatu subduction zone (previously called the New Hebrides subduction zone) towards the east where the trench has a north–south orientation. The trench is to the northeast of the Zealandia continental margin. The convergence rate in the subduction zone ranges from 120 mm (4.7 in)/yr in the south, to 40 mm (1.6 in)/yr in the central section, to the high rate of 170 mm (6.7 in)/yr in the north at about latitude 11°S in the Solomon Island region north of the Torres. The anomalous lack of convergence in the central section is caused by the subduction of the d'Entrecasteaux Ridge. The progressive subduction/collision of the NW–SE trending Loyalty Ridge located on the Australian plate under the southern Vanuatu microplates produces much earthquake activity but the most southernmost part of the trench south of latitude 22.5° S and east of longitude 170° E is not as highly tectonically active It has been suggested that the current northern subduction to the south of the bend to the east in the trench should be considered as a separate subduction zone, called the Matthew and Hunter subduction system or subduction zone given its immature current volcanic arc and other characteristics. It translates into the non subducting Hunter fracture zone which is a transform faulting fracture zone. From 3 million years ago the southernmost Central Spreading Ridge of the North Fiji Basin propagated southward and has now intersected with the New Hebrides Trench and the Hunter fracture zone to form a triple junction with the Conway Reef plate.

== Associated seismicity ==
The area of the southern part of the subduction zone between the latitudes 21.5 and 22.5° S and the longitudes 169 and 170° E is very active. There have been multiple earthquakes including swarms of magnitude Mw 7.0+ during recent decades impacting on New Caledonia and Vanuatu. The strain accumulation is regularly partially released through moderate to strong earthquakes during sequences which have included both interplate thrust faulting earthquakes and outer rise normal faulting earthquakes west and south-west of the trench.

The M_{w} 7.7 2021 Loyalty Islands earthquake (Matthew Island earthquake) was much stronger than the usual seismicity on the southernmost aspects of the trench. The epicenter was close to Matthew Island, and was both preceded and followed by a seismic crisis of multiple events with greater than M_{w} 5.0

=== Major earthquakes associated with the subduction zone ===
The table below shows only earthquakes greater than M_{w} 7.5 or significant earthquakes that are not in the list of earthquakes in Vanuatu and list of earthquakes in the Solomon Islands archipelago for geographical reasons.

Article	Date	Location	Magnitude (M_{w})
-	March 28, 1875	Loyalty Islands	8.1-8.2
-	August 9, 1901	Tadine, New Caledonia	7.9
-	June 16, 1910	Isangel, Vanuatu	7.8
-	September 20, 1920	Isangel, Vanuatu	7.9
-	August 25, 1926	Southern Vanuata Subduction Zone	7.0
-	December 2, 1950	Port-Vila, Vanuatu	7.9
-	December 17, 1957	Sola, Vanuatu	7.8
-	August 11, 1965	Central Vanuata Subduction Zone	7.6
-	December 31, 1966	Lata, Solomon Islands	7.8
-	July 17, 1980	Lata, Solomon Islands	7.9
2009 Vanuatu earthquakes	October 7, 2009	Sola, Vanuatu	7.8
2013 Solomon Islands earthquake	February 6, 2013	Lata, Solomon Islands	8.0
2021 Loyalty Islands earthquake (Matthew Island earthquake)	February 10, 2021	Southeast of the Loyalty Islands	7.7
-	March 30, 2022	Loyalty Islands fore-shock by 8 hours to the March 31 earthquake	6.9
-	March 31, 2022	Loyalty Islands 279 km (173 mi) southeast of Maré Island	7.0
-	May 19, 2023	Loyalty Islands 339 km (211 mi) east of Isle of Pines	7.7
2024 Port Vila earthquake	December 17, 2024	Vanuatu 30 km (19 mi) east of Port-Vila	7.3

== Tsunami risk ==
The region could trigger tsunamis with a main propagation axis striking from WSW–ENE (putting New Caledonia and south Vanuatu most at risk) to S–N (putting northern New Zealand and Vanuatu most at risk). The 5 December 2018 M_{w} 7.5 normal faulting earthquake generated a tsunami of more than 2 m (6 ft 7 in) in southern New Caledonia and Vanuatu.

== Ecology ==
The trench seawater has a temperature of about 2 °C (36 °F) from 2 kilometres (1.2 mi) to 6 kilometres (3.7 mi) depth. Fish species known include those from the genus Pachycara (e.g. Pachycara moelleri at 4 kilometres (2.5 mi) depth), Ilyophis robinsae or large Synaphobranchid, Synaphobranchus brevidorsalis, Hydrolagus spp., Bathyraja spp., Bassozetus spp., Antimora rostrata multiple species of Coryphaenoides, members of the Zoarcidae family and members of the family Alepocephalidae. For some reason, although well known in surrounding nearby waters, Macrourids are absent from the northern New Hebrides Trench. This is believed to be because the ecosystem characteristics allow the low-energy ophidiid to dominate. Amongst crustaceans, amphipods including members of the family Lysianassidae, prawns of the genus Benthesicymus (Benthesicymus crenatus, Benthesicymus howensis) and Aristeidae (Cerataspis monstrosus) and Oplophoridae shimp (Acanthephyra tenuipes and Heterogenys microphthalma) were found.
