= Babelomurex yamatoensis =

Scientific classification
- Kingdom: Animalia
- Phylum: Mollusca
- Class: Gastropoda
- Subclass: Caenogastropoda
- Order: Neogastropoda
- Superfamily: Muricoidea
- Family: Muricidae
- Subfamily: Coralliophilinae
- Genus: Babelomurex
- Species: B. yamatoensis

Binomial name
- Babelomurex yamatoensis Kosuge, 1986

Species of gastropod

Babelomurex yamatoensis is a species of sea snail, a marine gastropod mollusk, in the family Muricidae, the murex snails or rock snails.

== Distribution ==
This marine species occurs off the Philippines, New Caledonia (and the Norfolk Ridge), the New Hebrides.
