= Balmoral Reef plate =

Small tectonic plate in the south Pacific north of Fiji

Approximate surface projection on Pacific Ocean of minor plates in the region of the North Fiji Basin. Seismic context, is shown in a map in the article Vanuatu subduction zone. Mouse over shows feature names. Key: (red orange) New Hebrides plate; (brown) Balmoral Reef plate - pale brown ? bordering block; (orange) Conway Reef plate; (blue) Active subduction trenches; (yellow) Spreading centers or rifts

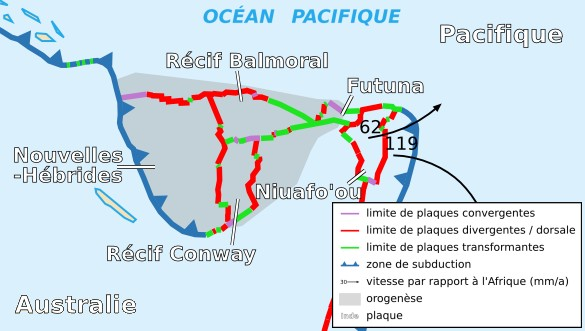
Map of the Balmoral Reef plate (as "Récif Balmoral") and its neighbouring plates (in French)

The Balmoral Reef plate is a small tectonic plate (microplate) located in the south Pacific north of Fiji. Clockwise from the north, it borders the Pacific plate, the Australian plate, Conway Reef plate, and the New Hebrides plate. The northern and western borders are a divergent boundary while the rest of the borders are transform and convergent boundaries. The Balmoral Reef plate's ocean crust is less than 12 million years old and is spreading between the New Hebrides and Tonga subduction. The plate forms the west central part of the seafloor of the North Fiji Basin.

The plate's movement vectors, as accepted today, were first proposed in 2003 by Bird. Its boundaries and angular momentum were further defined in 2011 and 2018 with refinement of tectonic plate deformation and strain rate. The Balmoral Reef plate however may be less rigid, as assumed in such modelling, as it is dominated by active deformation zones. The region is complex and may well have several other microplates or blocks. To the west its triple junction with the Pacific plate and the Australian plate is quite close to the western triple junction of the Futuna plate.

== See also ==
- North Fiji Basin
