= Hunter fracture zone =

Fault zone south of Fiji

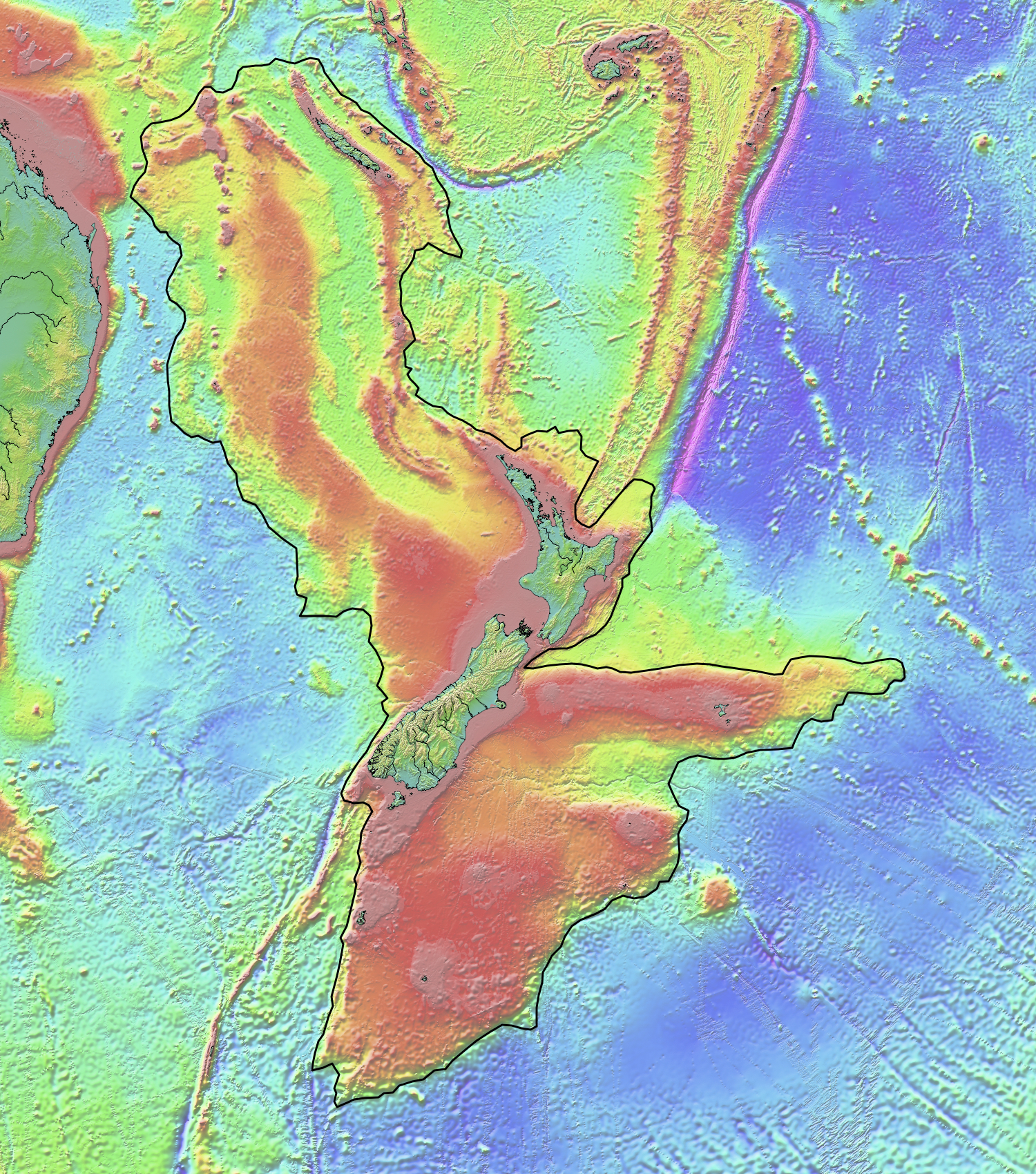
- Geographical and geological relationships of the Hunter fracture zone. Zealandia is outlined in black.
- Etymology: Hunter Island
- Coordinates: 20.667°S 177.0°W

Tectonics
- Plate: Australian, New Hebrides and the Conway Reef microplate
- Status: Active
- Age: Miocene-current

The Hunter fracture zone (HFZ) is a sinistral (left-lateral) transform faulting fracture zone, that to its south is part of a triple junction with the New Hebrides Trench, and the North Fiji Basin Central Spreading Ridge. The Hunter fracture zone, with the Hunter Ridge, an area with recent volcanic activity to its north, is the southern boundary of the North Fiji Basin. This boundary area in the south-western part of the Hunter fracture zone is associated with hot subduction, and a unique range of volcanic geochemistry.

== Geography ==
The Hunter fracture zone is located to the south and southwest of Fiji and starts where the southern part of the New Hebrides Trench ends due to the increasing obliqueness of convergence lending to more strike slip faulting than subducting. It terminates around the International Date Line, with the Kadavu Islands immediately to its north. However some earlier work has postulated that the fault structures around Suva on Fiji itself are related and different authors have defined the zone variably.

=== Seismicity ===
Approximate surface projection on Pacific Ocean of tectonic seismic zones near Hunter fracture zone including spreading activity in the North Fiji Basin to its north. White land top right are islands of Fiji. Key:
Up to 70 km (43 mi) deep shallow-focus earthquakes
70–300 km (43–186 mi) deep shallow-focus earthquakes
More than 300 km (190 mi) deep shallow-focus earthquakes
(orange) Hunter fracture zone
(blue) Active subduction trenches (New Hebrides Trench)
(light blue) Inactive trenches
(brown) Selected oceanic floor ridges (Hunter Ridge)
(yellow) Spreading centers or rifts
. Mouse over shows feature names.

The western Hunter fracture zone is an area of fair shallow seismicity. Large (more than M_{w} 6) earthquakes have occurred in historic times.

=== Tectonics ===
It defines part of the plate boundary between the New Hebrides and the Conway Reef microplate with the Australian plate, with the rest of the convergence being accommodated by subduction and rifting. The major present subduction and rifting is in an area where the Hunter Ridge is being split that is called the Monzier Rift.. This is active volcanically as part of a separate subduction system to the rest of the Vanuatu subduction zone that has been called the Matthew and Hunter subduction zone. The Hunter Ridge and Hunter fracture zone are the south eastern terminus of the Vanuatu subduction zone's subduction and its associated slab edge. From 3 million years ago the southernmost Central Spreading Ridge of the North Fiji Basin propagated southward and has now intersected with the New Hebrides Trench and the Hunter fracture zone to form the current triple junction.

== See also ==
- List of fracture zones
