= Fiji–France Maritime Delimitation Agreement =

1983 treaty between France and Fiji

Agreement between the Government of the Republic of France and the Government of Fiji relating to the delimitation of their economic zone
- Type: Boundary delimitation
- Signed: 19 January 1983
- Location: Suva, Fiji
- Effective: 21 August 1984
- Parties: Fiji; France
- Depositary: United Nations Secretariat
- Languages: English; French

The Fiji–France Maritime Delimitation Agreement is a 1983 treaty between France and Fiji which establishes the maritime boundary between Fiji and the French special collectivity of New Caledonia and the boundary between Fiji and the French overseas collectivity of Wallis and Futuna.

The treaty was signed in Suva on 19 January 1983. The text of the treaty is brief and states that the boundaries will be set by the principle of setting an equidistant line between the territories.

The boundary with New Caledonia is to the southwest of Fiji and consists of one maritime straight-line segment defined by two specific points. For purposes of drawing the border, the treaty assumes that France has sovereignty over Matthew and Hunter Islands, but since Vanuatu also claims sovereignty over the islands, the treaty states that the treaty is "without prejudice to the sovereign rights of any neighbouring State".

The boundary with Wallis and Futuna is to the northeast of Fiji and consists of four straight-line segments, defined by five individual coordinate points.

The agreement came into force on 21 August 1984, after both states had ratified it. The Fiji – Wallis and Futuna boundary was adjusted slightly by a 1990 codicil to the treaty.

The full name of the treaty is Agreement between the Government of the Republic of France and the Government of Fiji relating to the Delimitation of their Economic Zone.
