= Matthew Island and Hunter Island =

Islands of New Caledonia

Matthew and Hunter Islands
Disputed island
- Vanuatu and New Caledonia, Matthew and Hunter Islands on the bottom right.
- Interactive map of Matthew and Hunter Islands
- Other names: île Matthew, Umaenupne and île Hunter, Leka, Fern/Fearn Island (Hunter Island)

Geography
- Coordinates: 22°22′S 171°43′E
- Total islands: 2
- Area: 1.3 km^{2} (0.50 sq mi)
- Highest point: Mont Favard on Hunter Island at more than 240 m (790 ft)

Administration
- France
- Collectivity: New Caledonia

Claimed by
- France
- Collectivity: New Caledonia
- Vanuatu
- Province: Tafea

Demographics
- Population: 0

Matthew Island and Hunter Island are two uninhabited volcanic islands in the South Pacific, 300 kilometres (190 mi) east of New Caledonia and south-east of Vanuatu. The pair, which lie 70 km (43 mi) apart, are claimed by Vanuatu as part of Tafea Province, and considered by the people of Aneityum part of their custom ownership, but also claimed by France as part of New Caledonia.

Small, arid, without fresh water and not easily accessible, the islands had no interest for Britain or France during their colonisation of the Pacific in the course of the 18th and 19th centuries. France officially annexed both islands in 1929. In 1965, the United Kingdom also claimed the two islands, as part of the New Hebrides. France conducted a symbolic occupation in 1975. In 1980, on its independence, Vanuatu claimed sovereignty, but made no occupation of the islands. In 1979, Météo-France set up an automatic weather station on one of the islands, and the French Navy regularly visits both of them.

== Hunter Island ==
Hunter Island (French: île Hunter) is also known, as "Fern or Fearn Island", or "Leka" in the local language of Futuna island in southern Vanuatu. The first recorded European sighting of the island was by Captain Thomas Fearn from his trading ship Hunter in 1798. It lies about 70 km (43 mi) east of Matthew Island. About 0.6 square kilometres (0.23 sq mi) in area, the island has a domed shape, and some sources suggest a height of its highest peak, Mont Favard, of 242 metres (794 ft), but others are higher. It was first surveyed by the British between 1853 and 1856 at 974 ft (297 m) 297 metres (974 ft) high which is still given in a recent English source. There has been volcanic activity since 1856 and before 1982 French aviation photographic studies were interpreted to give an approximate height of 260 m (850 ft). Other French sources are slightly higher. It is composed of andesite – dacitic lavas and numerous explosion craters dot the stratovolcano. A cone makes up the south part of the island, with its central crater filled by a lava dome. A 100 m (330 ft)-deep crater is located on the north-west side of the island.

Hunter Island has been symbolically claimed by a micronation, the Federal Republic of Lostisland.

=== Volcanic activity ===
Fumarolic and solfataric activity continues in the north of the island, as well as on the northeast and southeast coasts. Two small eruptions took place in the mid-1800s. In 1835, a lava flow erupted and on 15 March 1841, an explosive eruption took place. In 1895, lava was seen flowing from two craters on the east side of the island. A minor fissure eruption took place in 1903, on the northern side of the island, and produced lava.

=== Important Bird Area ===
The island has been designated an Important Bird Area (IBA) by BirdLife International because it supports a breeding population of red-tailed tropicbirds, with some 100–200 pairs estimated in 2007.

== Matthew Island ==
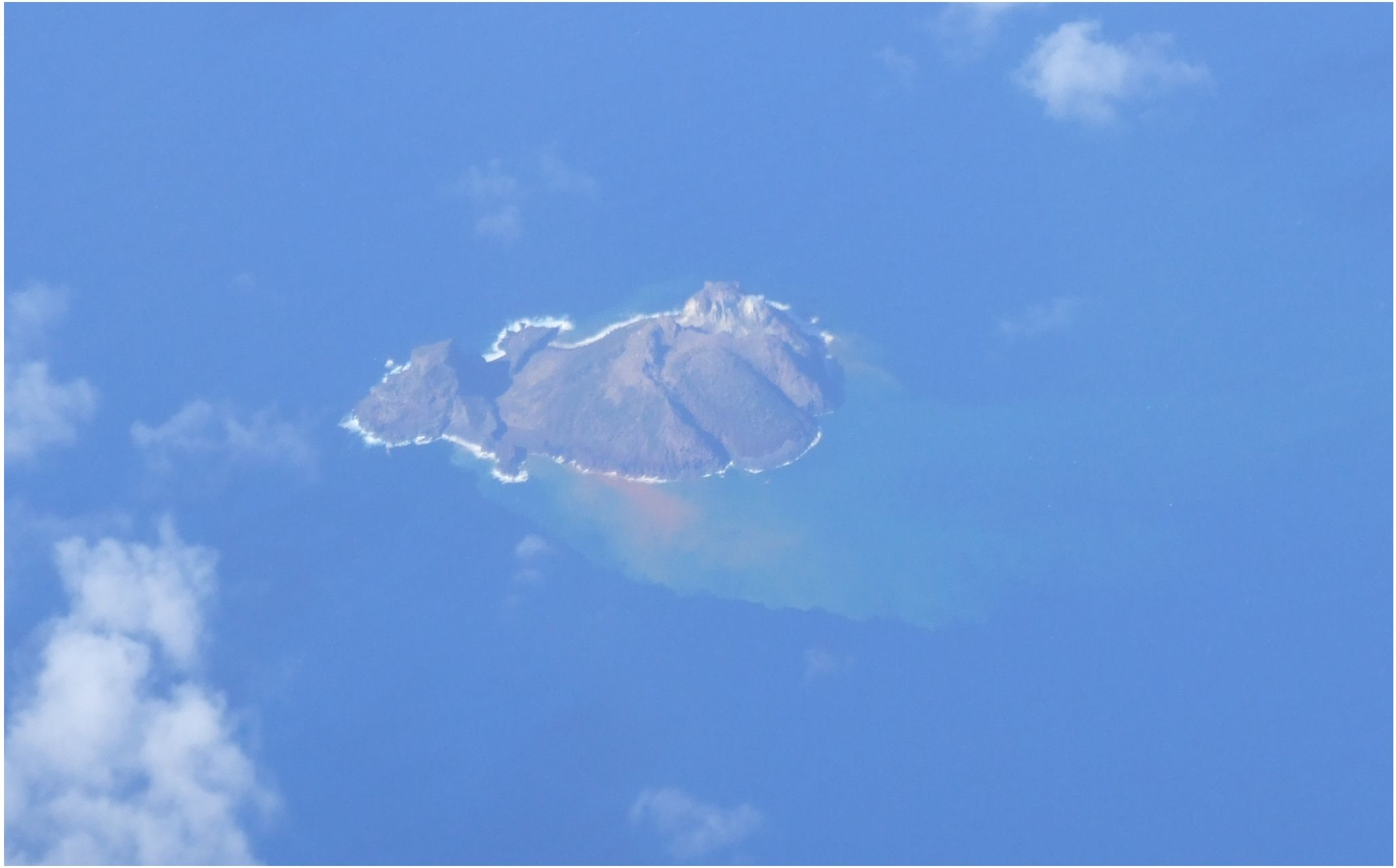
Matthew Island aerial view

Matthew Island (French: île Matthew) is also known as Umaenupne island in the indigenous language of Aneityum island in southern Vanuatu, the closest inhabited island. It is 0.7 square kilometres (0.27 sq mi) in area, 177-metre (581 ft). The volcanic island is composed of two andesitic-to-dactic volcanic cones, East Matthew and West Matthew, separated by a rocky 200-metre-wide isthmus. The island was discovered by Captain Thomas Gilbert, of Charlotte, on 27 May 1788, who named it after the owner of his ship. At the time of the discovery, only East Matthew existed and it was described as having only one peak prior to the Second World War.

East Matthew is the older part of the island, formed from basalt with a half-destroyed, 142 m (466 ft) high composite volcanic cone that is thought to be composed of three lava flows. There is still some volcanic activity on the island with sulphuric fumaroles rising from craters in the south-east. West Matthew formed in the late 1940s and may have had eruptions as recent as 1976. It is a roughly circular, 177 m (581 ft) high cone with a serrated peak and is composed almost entirely of lava flows and slag. It contains a crater that is breached to the northwest. A lava flow from West Matthew makes up the northwest coast of the island.

=== Eruptions ===
All known historical eruptions have come from West Matthew. After a highly seismically active period in the 1940s, construction of West Matthew began as submarine eruptions built up a new island. The new cone then emitted lava flows. The eruption was a VEI 2. Another VEI 2 eruption from West Matthew took place in October 1954, while a very small (VEI 0) fissure eruption occurred in approximately 1956. This marks the latest confirmed activity on Matthew Island, although tremors took place near the island in 2008, 2009 and 2011. Uncertainty surrounds a report of an eruption in 1828, as well as reports of eruptions in 1966 and 1976.

=== Important Bird Area ===
The island has been recognised as an Important Bird Area (IBA) by BirdLife International because it supports breeding populations of brown boobies and blue noddies.

=== Registry ===
In March 2025, it was reported that the Island was being used as a fraudulent ship register under the flag of the fictional Maritime Administration of Matthew Island (MAMI).

== Seismicity ==
The islands are prone to earthquakes, as they are situated near the southern arc of the South New Hebrides Trench, where the minor New Hebrides plate is subducted by the Australian plate. In February 2021, a 7.7 M_{w} quake was centered in the vicinity of Matthew and Hunter.

=== Tectonics ===
Both Matthew Island and Hunter Island are within the Hunter Ridge part of the New Hebrides plate, which was initially formed from about 7 to 3 million years ago, when the opening of the North Fiji Basin in a north–south direction allowed northward subduction of the South Fiji Basin part of the then Indo-Australian plate under the North Fiji Basin. From about 3 million years ago the current triple junction between the New Hebrides plate, Australian plate and the Conway Reef plate became established and the southernmost propagating tip of the Central Spreading Ridge backarc-spreading centre in the North Fiji Basin over the last 2 million years has rifted westward splitting the Hunter Ridge into two halves. New young subduction of the South Fiji Basin has created what has been called the Matthew and Hunter subduction zone. The various processes have resulted in unusually complex volcanic composition of the island's recent eruptives, as well as the continued seismicity assigned to the area as the south western part of the Hunter fracture zone.

== See also ==
- Fiji–France Maritime Delimitation Agreement
- Uninhabited island
- Lists of islands

== Bibliography ==
- Dunmore, John: Who's who in Pacific navigation, Honolulu: Univ. of Hawaii Pr., 1991 ISBN 0-8248-1350-2
- Heathcote, Sarah: Secession, Self-determination and Territorial Disagreements: Sovereignty Claims in the South Pacific, Leiden Journal of International Law vol. 34:3 (2021), 653-680, DOI: https://doi.org/10.1017/S0922156521000236
- Sharp, Andrew: The discovery of the Pacific Islands, Oxford 1960
- "Matthew Island". Global Volcanism Program. Smithsonian Institution.
- "Matthew Island Volcano". volcanolive.com.
- Song, Lily & Mosses, Morsen: "Revisiting Ocean Boundary Disputes in the South Pacific in Light of the South China Sea Arbitration: A Legal Perspective", The International Journal of Marine and Coastal Law 33 (2018): 768 – 798
- Lili Song, Morsen Mosses & Geraldine Giraudeau (2023): The Ambiguous History of Matthew and Hunter Islands: Tracing the Roots of Vanuatu and French Claims, The Journal of Pacific History, DOI: 10.1080/00223344.2022.2146577
