= 2021 Loyalty Islands earthquake =

Earthquake in New Caledonia

- Location within Oceania
- UTC time: 2021-02-10 13:19:55
- ISC event: 619942801
- USGS-ANSS: ComCat
- Local date: February 11, 2021
- Local time: 00:19
- Duration: 50 seconds
- Magnitude: 7.7 M_{w}
- Depth: 10.0 km (6.2 mi)
- Epicenter: 23.051°S 171.657°E
- Type: Megathrust
- Areas affected: Vanuatu; New Caledonia
- Max. intensity: MMI IV (Light)
- Tsunami: 1.35 m (4.4 ft) in Lenakel, Vanuatu
- Foreshocks: 6.1 M_{w}
- Aftershocks: Many. Strongest is 6.3 M_{w} (As of September 3, 2021)
- Casualties: none

The 2021 Loyalty Islands earthquake was a 7.7 magnitude earthquake that struck offshore between Vanuatu and New Caledonia on February 11, 2021, at 00:19 local time. It is the 4th largest earthquake of 2021.

== Tectonic setting ==
Located about 415 km to the east of the island of New Caledonia in the southwest Pacific Ocean occurred as the result of low angle thrust faulting on or near the plate boundary interface between the Indo-Australian plate and Pacific plate. Focal mechanism solutions indicate the earthquake occurred on either a shallow fault striking west and dipping to the north, or on a steep fault striking east. The earthquake was preceded by two foreshocks of M 6.1 and M 6.0 in the hour before the earthquake. At the location of this earthquake, the Indo-Australian plate moves towards the east-northeast with respect to the Pacific at a rate of approximately 75 mm/yr. At the South New Hebrides Trench, Australia lithosphere converges with and sinks beneath the Pacific plate, descending into the mantle and forming the New Hebrides/Vanuatu subduction zone, stretching from New Caledonia in the south to the Santa Cruz Islands in the north, a distance of about 1,600 km. The 2021 earthquake occurred in close vicinity to the New Hebrides trench, and its location, depth and focal mechanism solution are all consistent with it occurring on the subduction zone interface between the two plates. While commonly plotted as points on maps, earthquakes of this size are more appropriately described as slip over a larger fault area. Reverse (thrust) faulting events of the size of the 2021 earthquake are typically about 90 km long by 50 km wide in size. The Loyalty Islands region is very active seismically, and the region within 250 km of the 2021 earthquake has hosted 15 other M 7+ earthquakes over the preceding century. The largest prior event was a M 7.7 earthquake on May 16, 1995, which was located about 165 km west of the 2021 event, and to the southwest of the oceanic trench in the region commonly referred to as the outer rise. One of the most proximate of these historic earthquakes was a M 7.0 thrust faulting event in August 1926, about 68 km to the west of the 2021 earthquake. Several earthquake sequences in this region entail spatially and temporally complex seismicity characteristics. A M 7.3 earthquake in December 2003 located 220 km northwest of the February 2021 earthquake was part of an active sequence of about 250 M 4+ events, beginning in December 2003 and continuing into February 2004. That sequence included both interplate thrust faulting earthquakes (the largest event in the sequence was the M 7.3 earthquake) and normal faulting earthquakes to the west of the oceanic trench (the largest being a M 7.1 earthquake in January 2004). A similar sequence of interplate thrust and outer rise normal faulting earthquakes occurred in October–December 2017, just to the north of the 2003-04 sequence. The 2017 sequence began with a M 6.7 thrust faulting earthquake on October 31, 2017. The largest event in the sequence was a M 7.0 outer rise earthquake on November 19, 2017. Because of their remote locations far from land, these earthquakes do not cause significant shaking in populated areas and are not known to have resulted in damage or fatalities.

The Vanuatu region experiences a very high level of earthquake activity, with more than a dozen events of M 7+ having been recorded since the early decades of the 20th century. Recent large earthquakes near the October 7 events include a M 7.2 earthquake in 2007 and a M 7.5 earthquake in 1999. The subducting Indo-Australian plate is seismically active to depths of about 350 km beneath the islands of Vanuatu and New Caledonia.

== Earthquake ==
The earthquake was initially reported as 7.9 M_{w} before it was downgraded to 7.5 then revised to 7.7. It is the largest earthquake in New Caledonia since 1995, and the largest in Vanuatu since the 2009 Vanuatu earthquakes.

The earthquake occurred due to shallow thrust faulting along the New Hebrides subduction zone, where the Australian plate subducts beneath the New Hebrides plate. Bases on inferring the finite fault model by the United States Geological Survey, slip along the rupture was distributed mainly on the shallow subduction zone interface, near the trench. The entire rupture process occurred in approximately 50 seconds.

An area of slip measuring 4.2 meters occurred at depths of 10–25 km. Most of the slip occurred at that depth, and very little slip occurred at depths shallower than 10 km. Stresses was transferred from the megathrust to the subducting plate where outer-rise aftershocks were triggered. Although it was a shallow thrust earthquake with a moderate tsunami detected regionally, it did not display characteristics of a tsunami earthquake.

== Tsunami ==
A tsunami warning was issued, but later cancelled. The Pacific Tsunami Warning Centre reported waves up to 0.78 m (2.6 ft) high in Lenakel, Vanuatu. Further analysis found the tsunami had a height of 1.35 m (4.4 ft) in that location. In the neighboring island nation of Fiji, a 0.3 m (0.98 ft) high tsunami was observed.

== Aftershocks ==
As of September 3, 2021, there have been 141 aftershocks above magnitude 5.0, the strongest having a magnitude of 6.3.

== See also ==
- 2009 Vanuatu earthquakes
- List of earthquakes in 2021
