= North Fiji Basin =

Oceanic basin in the south-west Pacific Ocean between Fiji and Vanuatu

- Stratigraphic range: 12–0 Ma
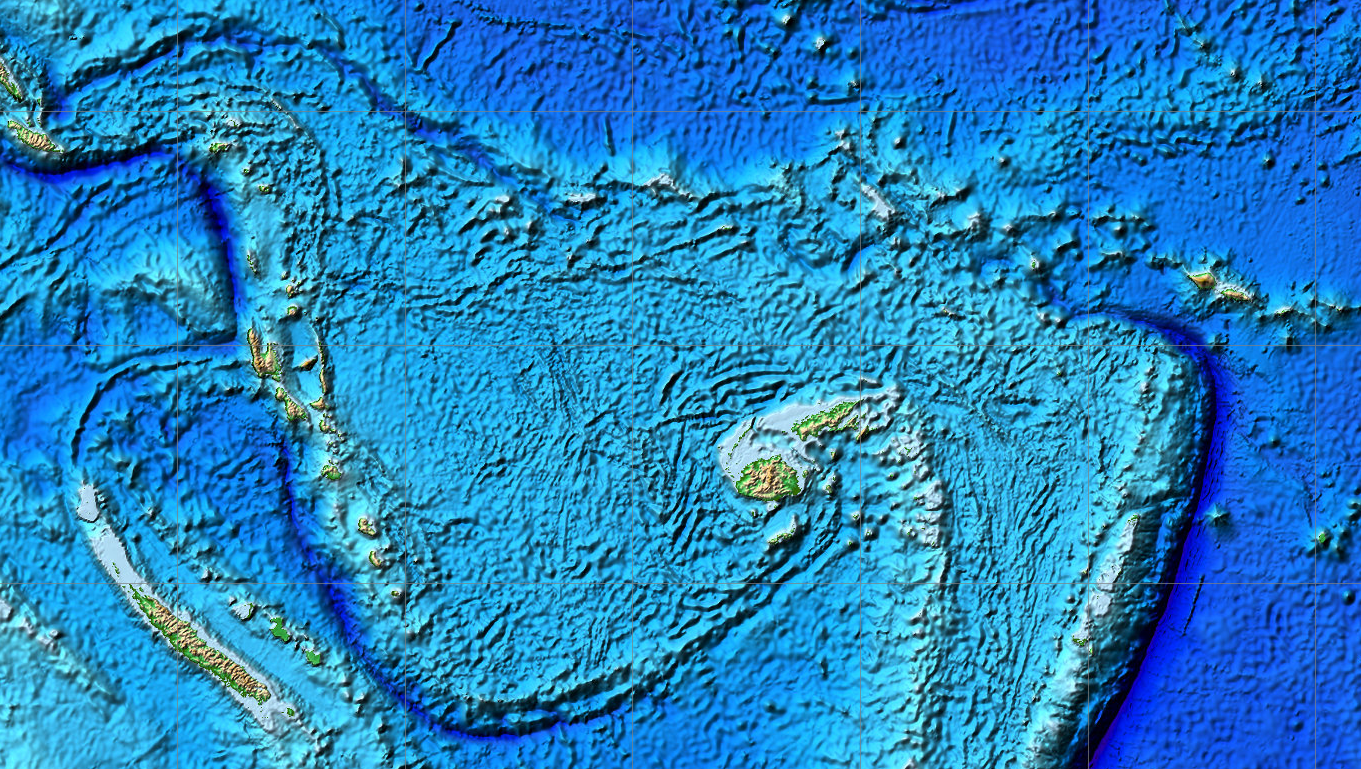
- North Fiji Basin

Lithology
- Primary: mafic basalts

Location
- Coordinates: 17°S 173°E
- Region: South Pacific
- Country: Fiji

Type section
- Named for: Fiji

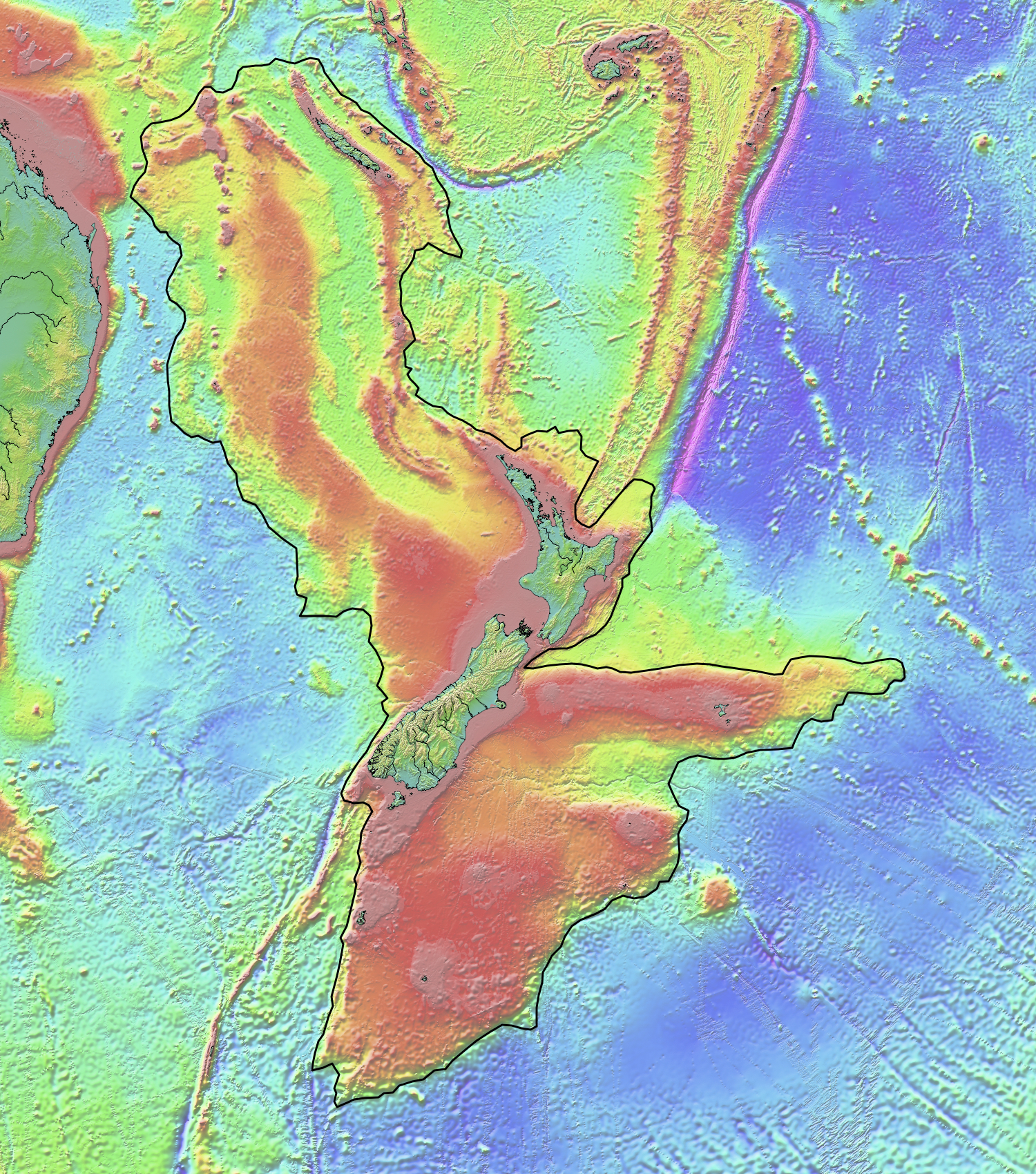
Geographical and geological relationships to the south of the North Fiji Basin. The Zealandia continent is outlined in black.

The North Fiji Basin (NFB) is an oceanic basin west of Fiji in the south-west Pacific Ocean. It is an actively spreading back-arc basin delimited by the Fiji islands to the east, the inactive Vitiaz Trench to the north, the Vanuatu/New Hebrides island arc to the west, and the Hunter fracture zone to the south. Roughly triangular in shape with its apex located at the northern end of the New Hebrides Arc, the basin is actively spreading southward and is characterised by three spreading centres and an oceanic crust younger than 12 Ma. The opening of the NFB began when a slab roll-back was initiated beneath the New Hebrides and the island arc started its clockwise rotation. The opening of the basin was the result of the collision between the Ontong Java Plateau and the Australian plate along the now inactive Solomon–Vitiaz subduction system north of the NFB. The NFB is the largest and most developed back-arc basin of the south-west Pacific. It is opening in a complex geological setting between two oppositely verging subduction systems, the New Hebrides/Vanuatu and Tonga Trenches and hence its ocean floor has the World's largest amount of spreading centres per area.

Two opposite-facing systems of deformation partly overlap where the Australian and Pacific plates meet along a section of the andesite line in the south-west Pacific: east of the NFB the Kermadec-Tonga Arc stretches some 3,000 km (1,900 mi) north from New Zealand, and west of the NFB the New Hebrides subduction zone formed during the opening of the NFB back-arc basin.

There are three small tectonic plates in the NFB: New Hebrides, Balmoral Reef, and Conway Reef.

Little was known about the NFB before 1985 and in the 1970s the central part of the basin, the only mapped area, was called the North Fiji Plateau.

== Margins ==
Approximate surface projection on Pacific Ocean of the current spreading centers (yellow) in the North Fiji Basin. The Hunter Ridge (brown) defines the south west border of the basin. The Vitiaz Trench (light blue) defines most of the northern border of the basin. Also shown is a zone of very deep-focus earthquakes related to past slab subduction at this trench (light red). More seismic context, including a map of the approximate area of shallow focus earthquakes in the North Fiji Basin is shown in a map in the article Vanuatu subduction zone. Mouse over shows feature names.

=== Vanuatu ===
The New Hebrides central chain stretches 1,200 km (750 mi) from Ureparapara island, Banks Islands, in the north to Hunter island in the south. The New Hebrides Trench retreats progressively which causes the southern end the subduction zone to bend eastward. The Australian plate subducts under Vanuatu at the New Hebrides Trench which results in a complex of rifts and transforms in the NFB. The New Hebrides island chain itself is being deformed as buoyant features such as d'Entrecasteaux Ridge and West Torres Plateau are being subducted in this process. NFB is the product of the asymmetric back-arc opening about a hinge point at 11°S, 165°E around which the Vanuatu chain has rotated 28° clockwise during the last 6 Ma, or 6–7.5°/Ma. This rotation has also caused rifting in the northern part of the NFB. Vanuatu can be divided into a southern and a northern tectonic blocks separate from the western NFB block. These blocks are separated by an extensional zone east of the islands chain.

=== Lau ===
In the Lau Basin east of the NFB the Pacific plate is subducting westward under Tonga Trench in the highest rate of back-arc rifting known — where the Louisville seamount chain subducts under the Tonga Trench rifting propagates at 10 cm/year (3.9 in/year). This seamount chain–trench intersection propagates southward at a rate of 12.8 cm/year (5.0 in/year) and, as a consequence, Tonga Islands rotate clockwise at a rate of 9.3°/Ma.

=== Hunter fracture zone ===
The southern margin of the NFB is formed by the Hunter fracture zone and the Hunter Ridge (including Matthew and Hunter Islands, two active volcanoes). The central spreading ridge of the NFB transects Hunter Ridge and a small spreading centre is developing south of it. The Hunter Ridge formed c. 3 Ma and fossil transform faults in NFB north of the ridge are remains of a spreading ridge that was active before the Vanuatu Trench propagated south of the southern end of Vanuatu, Anatom Island.

=== Vitiaz Trench ===
The northern Melanesian arc collided with the subducted south-eastern segment of the Ontong Java Plateau at 10–8 Ma. This collision reversed the direction of subduction in the Vitiaz Trench and thus initiated the clockwise rotation of the Vanuatu arc and the opening of the NFB at 8–3 Ma. An isolated zone of deep-focus earthquakes towards the middle of the basin would be explained by the continuing slab subduction of the Pacific plate remnant from before 110–8 Ma that cut off when the collision with the Ontong Java Plateau occurred stalling further subduction and reorientating the direction of subduction in the area.

== Intra-basin morphology ==
There are two main spreading systems in the central and southern part of the NFB: the Central Spreading Ridge and the West Fiji Rift, both with a variable spreading rate of 5–8 cm/year (2.0–3.1 in/year). In the northern NFB a series of spreading centres stretches 1,500 km (930 mi) along an east–west-trending belt (with spreading rates): the Futuna (1–4 cm/year (0.39–1.57 in/year) and North Cikobia (2 cm/year (0.79 in/year) spreading centres, and the Tripartite (2–5 cm/year (0.79–1.97 in/year), South Pandora, and Hazel-Holmes ridges. Basalts in the Central Spreading ridge are of N-MORB-type, indicative of a mature accretionary system, whereas basalts in the northern NFB have an ocean island basalt (OIB) mantle source.

=== Central spreading ridge ===
The central spreading centre of the NFB is the largest and probably the oldest back-arc basin on Earth. It can be divided into four 120–200 km (75–124 mi)-long segments:

1. The southernmost segment (21°40'S–20°30'S) stretches c. 120 km (75 mi) trending north–south. It has a complicated morphology with 2,500 m (8,200 ft)-deep ridges separated by 3,000 m (9,800 ft)-deep depressions. This makes the exact location of the spreading ridge difficult to identify, but magnetic lineations reveal its presence. The morphology is intermediate between fast and slow spreading ridge.
2. The north–south segment (21°S–18°10'S) is 310 km (190 mi)-long and the least complicated with the axial ridge below 3,000 m (9,800 ft) c. 20 km (12 mi) wide. A flat-topped dome reaching 2,800 m (9,200 ft) is cut in half by a graben a few hundred metres wide and tens of metres deep. The dome is flanked by symmetrical grabens. V-shaped pseudofaults at the northern and southern ends are traces of the propagating ridge segment.
3. The N15° segment is c. 120 km (75 mi)-long and corresponds to a change in spreading direction from north–south to N15°. The southern part is poorly defined with an accretion distributed over numerous small volcanoes scattered over a wide area. A double ridge north of 17°55'S flanks a graben 2–3 km (1.2–1.9 mi)-wide, 200–300 m (660–980 ft)-deep. A shallow massif at the northern tip is cut by a graben 0.5–2 km (0.31–1.24 mi)-wide, 200 m (660 ft)-deep. This part harbours hydrothermal vents. The N15° segment is flanked by curved grabens interpreted as fossil overlapping spreading centres. There is a triple junction at 16°50'N.
4. The northern N160° segment is 200 km (120 mi)-long, and has three parts:
  - In the southern part (16°50'S–15°30'S) the spreading axis is a 4,000–4,500 m (13,100–14,800 ft)-deep, 8 km (5.0 mi)-wide graben flanked by near-vertical walls. It has the morphology of slow-spreading ridges with an axis cut by a 2–3 km (1.2–1.9 mi)-wide, 400–500 m (1,300–1,600 ft)-high ridge. A bend at 16°10'S offsets the ridge 4 km (2.5 mi). This part is flanked by a volcanic massif which reaches a depth of less than 1,700 m (5,600 ft) and is 100 km (62 mi)-wide at its southern end but disappears north of 15°30'S. Volcanism and uplift of older oceanic crust was initiated at c. 1 Ma.
  - The central part (15°30'S–15°00'S) has two en echelon grabens that offset the axis 40 km (25 mi). They form a domain 60 km (37 mi)-long, 4,000 m (13,000 ft)-deep and each graben is made of 10 km (6.2 mi)-long en echelon segments. Magmatic supply here limited to a narrow ridge separating the grabens and accretion has been mostly amagmatic for the past 1 Ma.
  - North of 15°N the central spreading ridge is complex with two branches forming a possible triple junction. The western branch trending N120° is a 4 km (2.5 mi)-wide, 4,000 m (13,000 ft)-deep graben which cuts through older oceanic crust. The northern branch trending N140° is a 2,400 m (7,900 ft)-deep ridge and forms a continuation of the N160° segment.

=== West Fiji Rift ===
The West Fiji area is dominated by a western and an eastern graben separated by a central plateau. The western graben, 10 km (6.2 mi)-wide and 4,000 km (2,500 mi)-deep, is flanked by a steep western wall but a series of steps on its eastern side and is a propagating rift. A ridge on its western side, reaching less than 2,000 m (6,600 ft) bsl, is flanked by another graben, 4 km (2.5 mi)-wide and 3,000 m (9,800 ft)-deep. This system of grabens and ridges, probably the southern extremity of the North Fiji fracture zone, converges in a flat area at the southern end of the western graben, 3,500 m (11,500 ft)-deep, that is flanked by two pseudofaults c. 500 m (1,600 ft)-high. The eastern graben, 10–12 km (6.2–7.5 mi)-wide and 3,200 m (10,500 ft)-deep, is flanked by parallel ridges and depressions over a 25 km (16 mi)-wide area. In the central plateau there is a fan-shaped system of ridges and depressions, the centre of which is occupied by a 3,000 m (9,800 ft)-deep and 10 km (6.2 mi)-wide graben. The sedimentary cover is thin or absent over the entire area. Pillow basalts in both the western and eastern grabens have a composition close to the mid-ocean ridge basalt (MORB) of the central spreading ridge.

=== Northern North Fiji Basin ===
The South Pandora and Tripartite Ridges in the northern NFB are active spreading ridges with 50–100 km (31–62 mi)-long segments, a 10–20 km (6.2–12.4 mi)-wide volcanic axis, and ordered magnetic lineations running parallel to the ridge. The ridge segments are separated by complex relay zones rather than transform faults.

The South Pandora Ridge is divided into five segments averaging 20 km (12 mi) in width. The axial valley is partly obscured by faulted and rifted volcanic structures; elongated grabens are typical of slow spreading ridges with steep walls flanking a deep valley. On either side of the ridge there are numerous, large volcanoes; a very thin or absent sedimentary cover over a distance of c. 100 km (62 mi); and continuous magnetic lineations indicating a very low half spreading rate (8 km (5.0 mi)/Ma) during the past 7 Ma.

The Tripartite Ridge is divided into three segments oriented in different directions. It is a very young ridge that is propagating into an older domain covered by sediments.

The inactive volcanic islands Mitre and Anuta are rejuvenated Vitiaz Arc volcanoes that formed 2.2 Ma, probably as a consequence of a change in the motion of the Pacific plate.

== Tectonic evolution ==
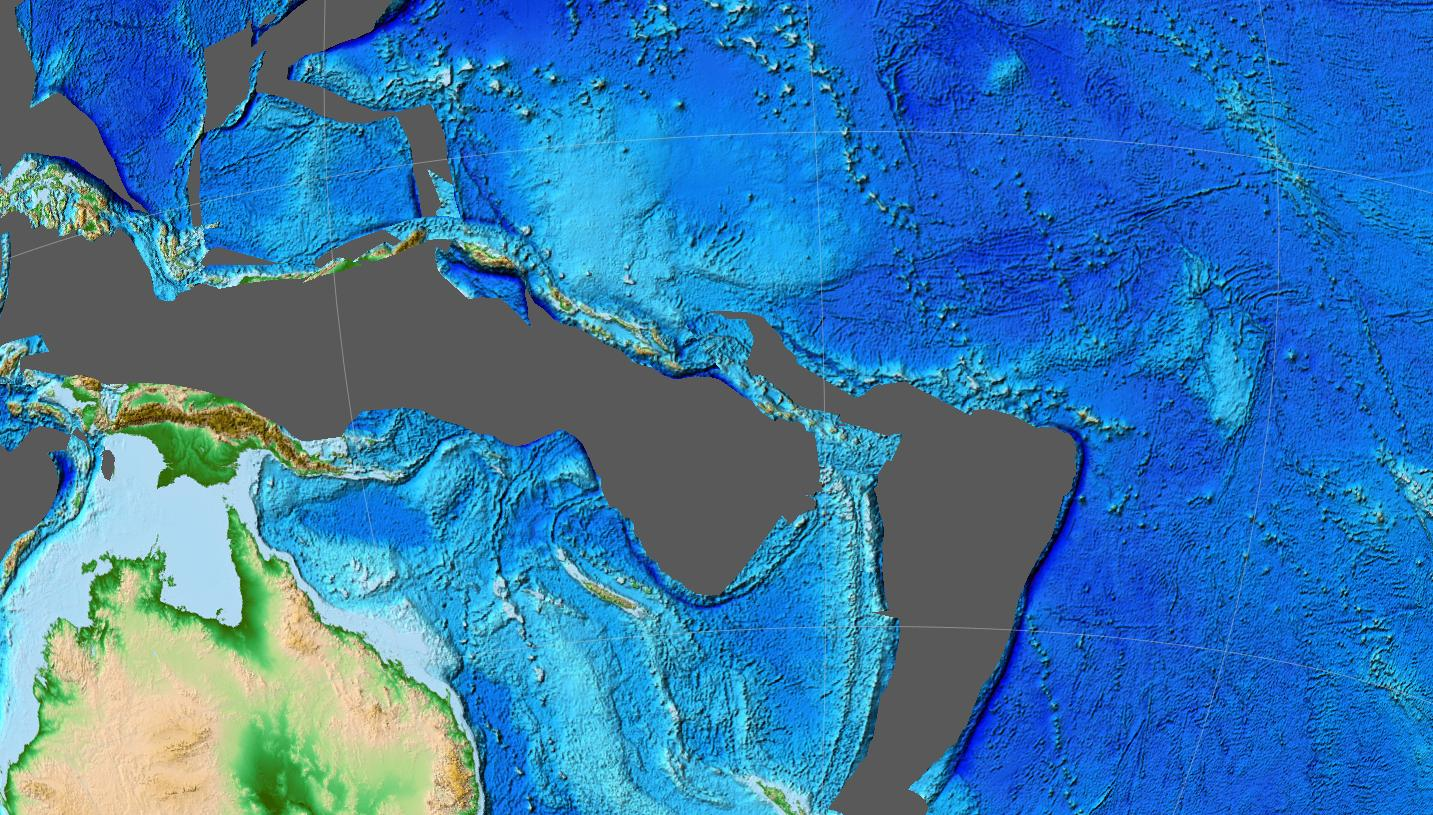
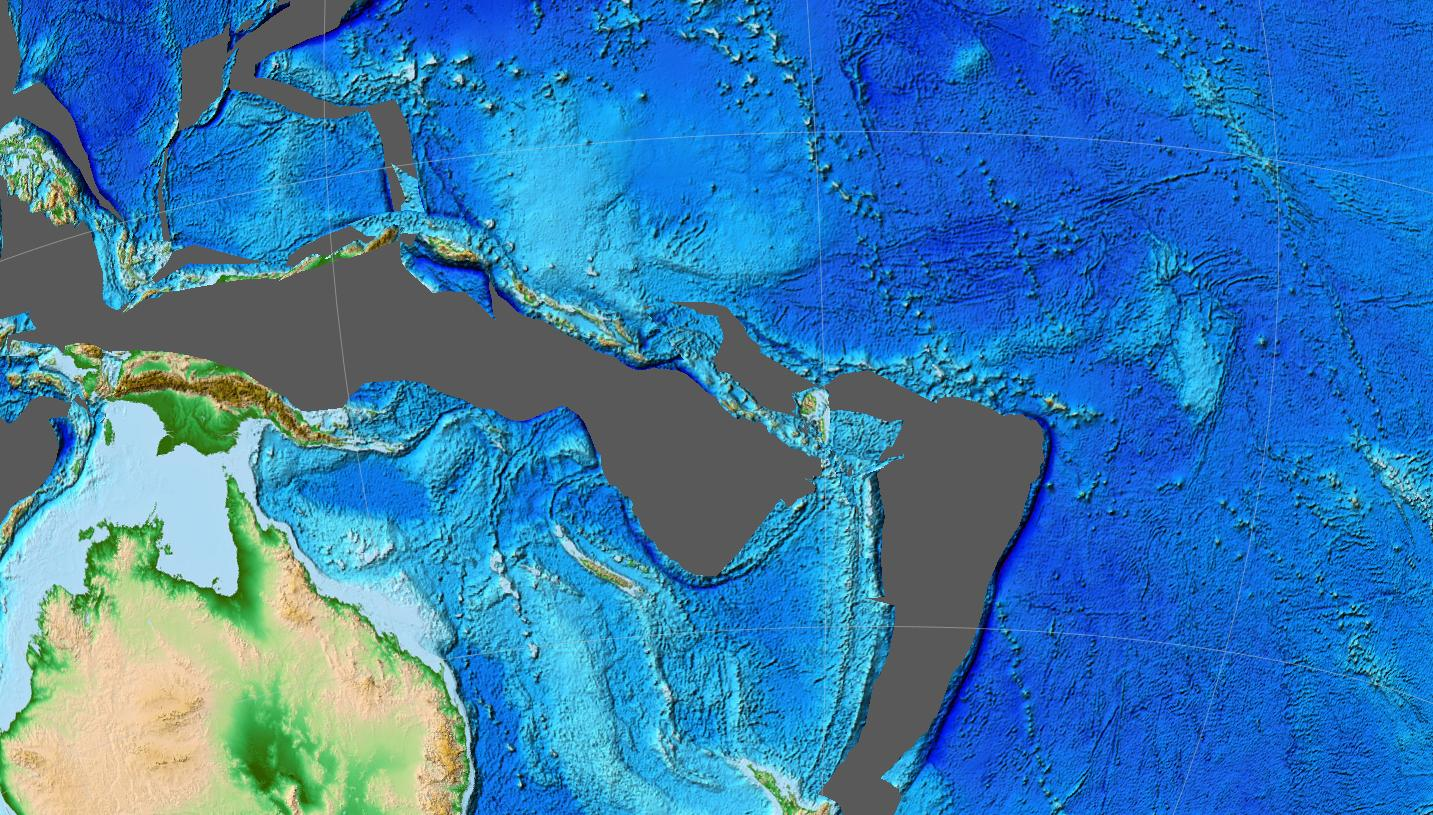
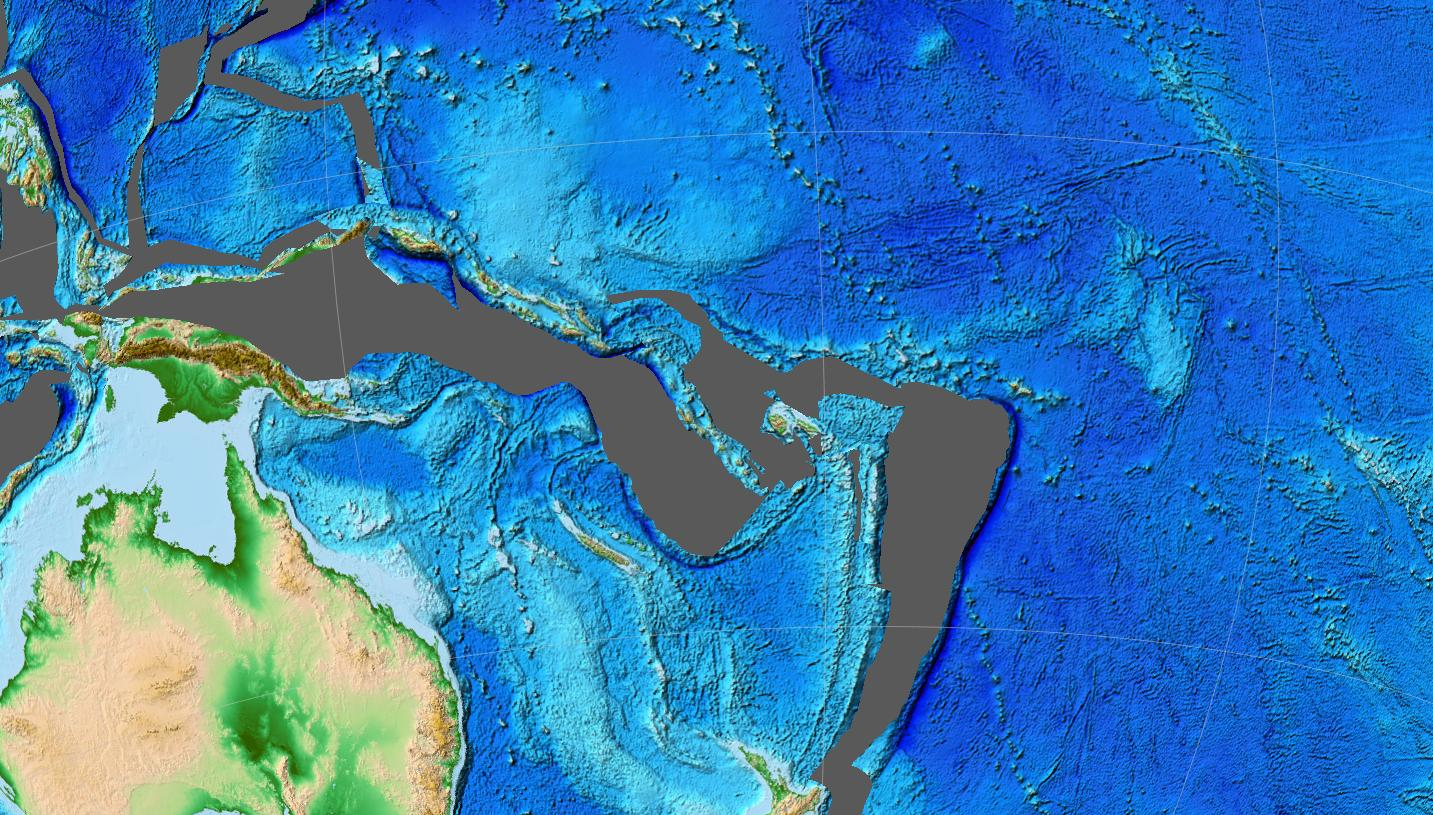
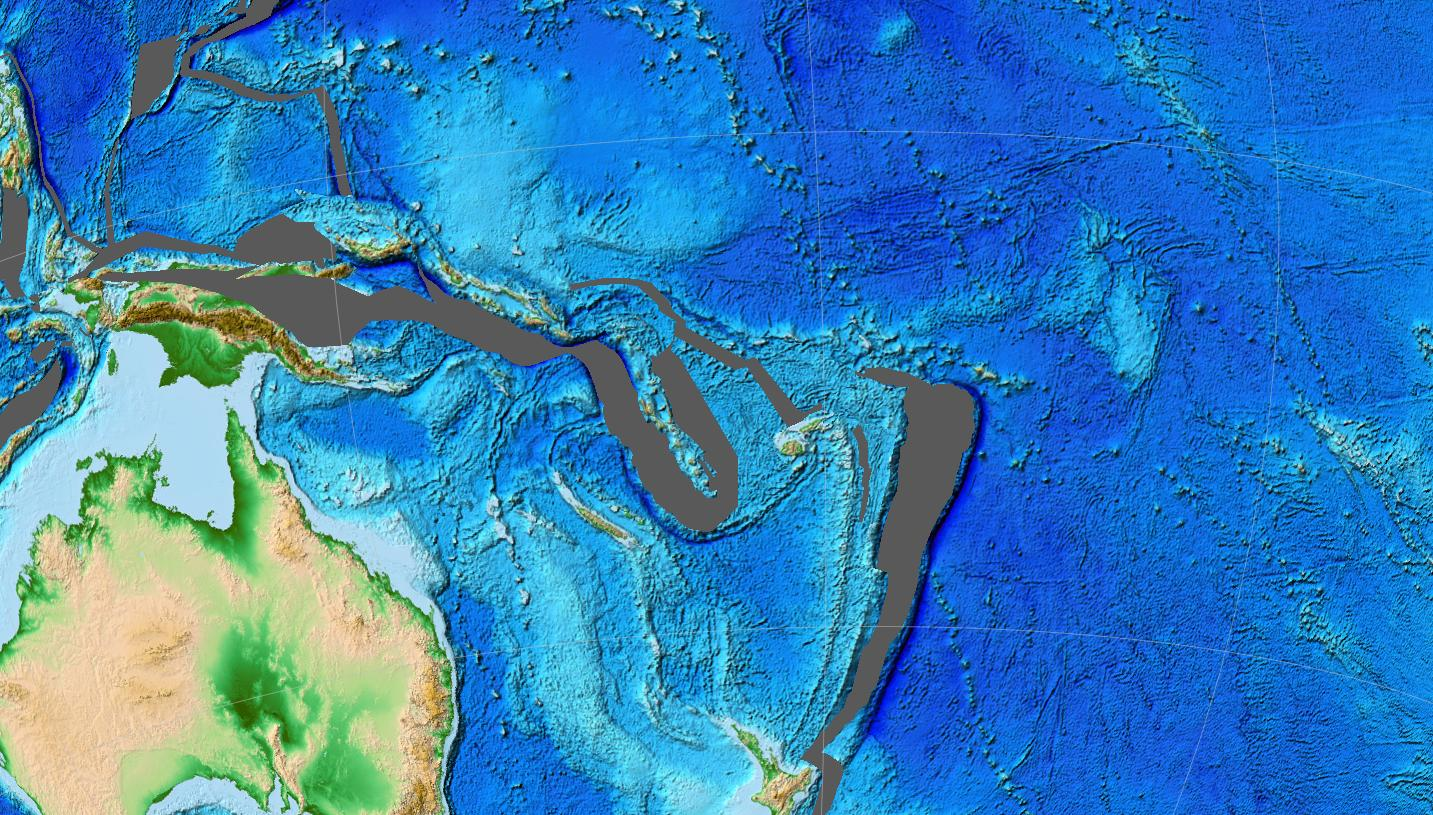
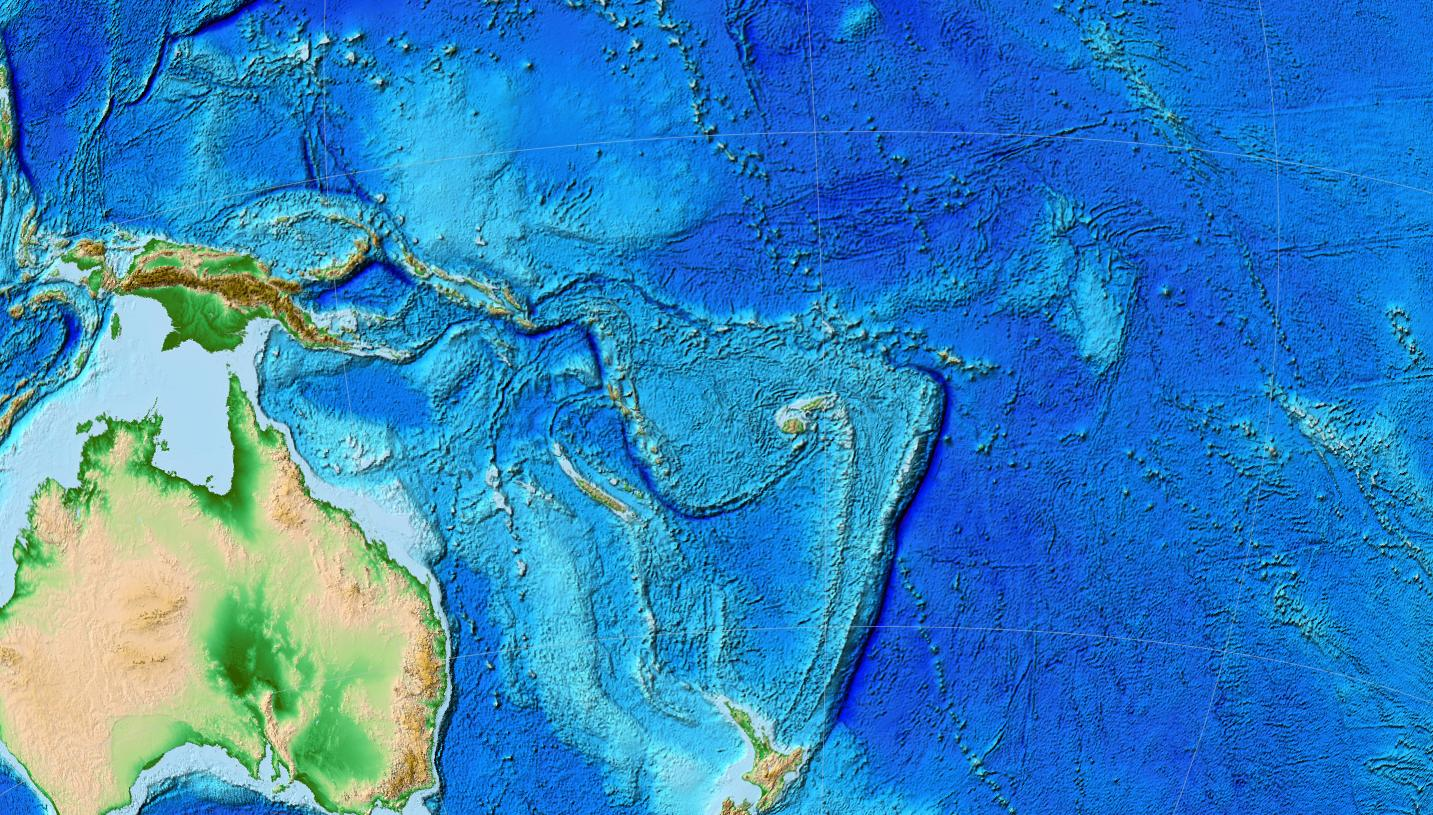
Opening of the NFB from 12 Ma to present. Grey areas represent now subducted ocean floor.

100–45 Ma, after the break-up of Gondwana, a single, almost continuous arc-subduction system existed in the south-west Pacific, from Solomon Islands to New Zealand's North Island. Today only two actively spreading back-arc basins remain in the region: Taupō–Kermadec–Tonga and Hunter–Vanuatu. Other geological structures are remnants of island arcs and back-arc basins mostly from the Eocene and Miocene, including the Vitiaz Trench and the Lau–Colville, Three Kings, and Loyalty ridges. Accordingly, the Loyalty-Three Kings Ridge once formed a single, continuous arc with the Lau-Colville Ridge which is called the Vitiaz arc.

The Fiji–New Hebrides region is made of volcanic rock but where volcanism began is uncertain. The region probably formed far south-west of its present location where it was subsequently rifted apart when the South Fiji Basin opened in the Early Oligocene. From the Early Oligocene to Miocene the region was part of an arc that formed the northern margin of the Australian plate. The NFB back-arc basin broke through this margin c. 12 Ma and has since the Late Miocene rotated the New Hebrides Arc 30° clockwise and Fiji at least 100° counter-clockwise.

Today the Pacific plate is subducting westward along the eastern margin of the NFB, the Tonga-Kermadec Trench. The Australian plate is subducting eastward along the western margin of the NFB, the New Hebrides Trench. The transition between these opposed subduction systems is the Fiji fracture zone, a complex left-lateral succession of ridges and faults north of Fiji that extends into the North Fiji and Lau basins respectively.

=== Slab avalanche ===
Large magnitude earthquakes beneath the NFB have been attributed to a detached slab segment of the subducted Australian plate which collided with the subducting Pacific plate at a depth of 500 km (310 mi) c. 5 Ma. The earthquakes are the result of these colliding slabs settling on the 660 km discontinuity.

Beneath Tonga at a depth of 350–500 km (220–310 mi) the number of earthquakes increases dramatically while the shape of the Pacific becomes complex. Hundreds of these earthquakes occur outside the Wadati–Benioff zone (top of slab) along a horizontal plane. The eastward subduction of the Australian plate (together with the now-fused South Fiji plate) under NFB created the New Hebrides and south Solomon Islands. The slab produced from this subduction stretches steeply down to 300–350 km (190–220 mi) except at its southern end where it only reaches 150 km (93 mi). The north end of the slab, at the southern Rennell Trough, corresponds to the sharp bend in the andesite line. A detached slab from the east-dipping Australian plate beneath the NFB has slid eastward and collided with the west-dipping Pacific slab. A series of unusual earthquakes below the NFB occur within several such detached slab segments. If these segments are combined and reconstructed back to their original location at the surface, they equal both the NFB and the subducted part of the Australian plate since 12 Ma in area.

The Tonga slab is avalanching through the 660 km layer at the southern end of the New Hebrides Aarc and Trench. The Pacific plate has been subducting at the Tonga Trench for a long time which led to an accumulation of slab material at the 660 km layer south of the Vitiaz Trench while the New Hebrides island arc has been pushed southward and clockwise. It also reversed the direction of subduction and opened the NFB back-arc and pushed the Vitiaz slab into the mantle and initiated the subduction at New Hebrides Trench. The slab avalanche was initiated at c. 8 Ma and most of the material is now located 450 km (280 mi) below the 660 km layer.

The slab beneath Tonga and Kermadec penetrates into the lower mantle. It is dipping down from Tonga Trench but deflects horizontally at the 660 km discontinuity. There is a detached remnant slab beneath the Vanuatu Trench. At the Kermadec Trench the Pacific plate has been subducting since 40 Ma

== See also ==
- Geology of the Pacific Ocean
- Samoa hotspot
- South Fiji Basin
