= Depth of focus (tectonics) =

Depth at which an earthquake occurs

In seismology, the depth of focus or focal depth is the depth at which an earthquake occurs. Earthquakes occurring at a depth of less than 70 km (43 mi) are classified as shallow-focus earthquakes, while those with a focal depth between 70 km (43 mi) and 300 km (190 mi) are commonly termed mid-focus or intermediate-depth earthquakes. In subduction zones, where older and colder oceanic crust sinks under another tectonic plate, deep-focus earthquakes may occur at much greater depths in the mantle, ranging from 300 km (190 mi) up to 700 km (430 mi).

The cause of deep-focus earthquakes is still not entirely understood since subducted lithosphere at that pressure and temperature regime should not exhibit brittle behavior. A possible mechanism for the generation of deep-focus earthquakes is faulting caused by olivine undergoing a phase transition into a spinel structure, with which they are believed to be associated. Earthquakes at this depth of focus typically occur at oceanic-continental convergent boundaries, along Wadati–Benioff zones.

== Discovery ==
The evidence for deep-focus earthquakes was discovered in 1922 by H.H. Turner of Oxford, England. Previously, all earthquakes were considered to have shallow focal depths. The existence of deep-focus earthquakes was confirmed in 1931 from studies of the seismograms of several earthquakes, which in turn led to the construction of travel-time curves for intermediate and deep earthquakes.

== Fixed depth ==
When seismic data is too scarce to calculate a focal depth, a "fixed depth" is assigned. For example, many earthquakes occurring in oceans are assigned a fixed depth because of limited local seismic records. The United States Geological Survey presently determines 10 km (6.2 mi) to be the fixed depth for most shallow earthquakes as their actual focal depth is usually close to that value. Many earthquakes in their catalogue are assigned 10 km (6.2 mi) depth. The previous fixed depth used by the agency was 33 km (21 mi).

== See also ==
- Asthenosphere
- Focus (earthquake)
- Lithosphere
