= New Hebrides plate =

Minor Pacific Ocean tectonic plate

Approximate surface projection on Pacific Ocean of minor plates in the region of the North Fiji Basin. Seismic context, is shown in a map in the article Vanuatu subduction zone. Mouse over shows feature names. Key: (red orange) New Hebrides plate; (brown) Balmoral Reef plate - pale brown ? bordering block; (orange) Conway Reef plate; (blue) Active subduction trenches; (yellow) Spreading centers or rifts

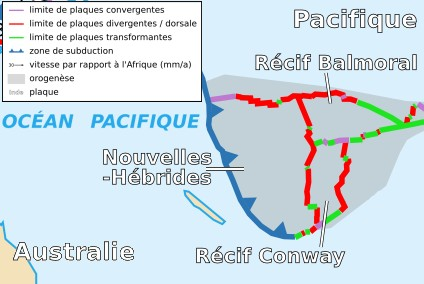
Map of the New Hebrides plate ("Nouvelles Hébrides") and its neighboring plates (in French)

The New Hebrides plate, sometimes called the Neo-Hebridean plate, is a minor tectonic plate (just larger than a microplate) located in the Pacific Ocean. While most of it is submerged as the sea bottom of the North Fiji Basin, the island country of Vanuatu, with multiple arc volcanoes, is on the western edge of the plate. It is bounded on the south-west by the Australian plate, which is subducting below it at the New Hebrides Trench. The Vanuatu subduction zone is seismically active, producing many earthquakes of magnitude 7 or higher. To its north is the Pacific plate, north-east the Balmoral Reef plate and to its east the Conway Reef plate.

At its south, convergence is being accommodated by rifting in the western stretch of the New Hebrides Trench, and transform faulting in the Hunter Ridge north of this stretch of the trench. The transform faulting is more established in the Hunter fracture zone which continues as the southern border of the Conway Reef plate towards Fiji.

The region is complex and may well have several other microplates or blocks.

== See also ==
- List of earthquakes in Vanuatu

== Citations ==
- Bird, Peter (2003). "An updated digital model of plate boundaries". Geochemistry, Geophysics, Geosystems. 4 (3): 1027. Bibcode:2003GGG.....4.1027B. doi:10.1029/2001GC000252.
- Calmant, S.; Pelletier, B.; Lebellegard, P.; Bevis, M.; Taylor, F. W.; Phillips, D. A. (2003). "New insights on the tectonics along the New Hebrides subduction zone based on GPS results" (PDF). J. Geophys. Res. 108 (B6): 2319. Bibcode:2003JGRB..108.2319C. doi:10.1029/2001JB000644.
- Roger, J; Pelletier, B; Gusman, A; Power, W; Wang, X; Burbidge, D; Duphil, M (2023). "Potential tsunami hazard of the southern Vanuatu subduction zone: tectonics, case study of the Matthew Island tsunami of 10 February 2021 and implication in regional hazard assessment". Natural Hazards and Earth System Sciences. 23 (2): 393–414. Bibcode:2023NHESS..23..393R. doi:10.5194/nhess-23-393-2023. S2CID 253207848.
- Durance, PM; Jadamec, MA; Falloon, TJ; Nicholls, IA (1 August 2012). "Magmagenesis within the Hunter Ridge Rift Zone resolved from olivine-hosted melt inclusions and geochemical modelling with insights from geodynamic models". Australian Journal of Earth Sciences. 59 (6): 913–31. Bibcode:2012AuJES..59..913D. doi:10.1080/08120099.2012.682096. S2CID 67848457.
- Argus, DF; Gordon, RG; DeMets, C (2011). "Geologically current motion of 56 plates relative to the no‐net‐rotation reference frame". Geochemistry, Geophysics, Geosystems. 12 (11): 1–13. Bibcode:2011GGG....1211001A. doi:10.1029/2011GC003751.
- Covellone, BM; Savage, B; Shen, Y (15 June 2015). "Seismic wave speed structure of the Ontong Java Plateau". Earth and Planetary Science Letters. 420: 140–50. doi:10.1016/j.epsl.2015.03.033.
- Szitkar, F; Dyment, J; Pelleter, E; Thomas, Y; Marsset, B; Ker, S; Fouquet, Y (2022). "Effusive and explosive volcanism on the northern Futuna Ridge, Lau Basin: A combined bathymetric, magnetic and seismic investigation". Journal of Volcanology and Geothermal Research. 431 (107646). doi:10.1016/j.jvolgeores.2022.107646.
