= Conway Reef plate =

Small tectonic plate in the south Pacific west of Fiji

Approximate surface projection on Pacific Ocean of minor plates in the region of the North Fiji Basin. Seismic context, is shown in a map in the article Vanuatu subduction zone. Mouse over shows feature names. Key: (red orange) New Hebrides plate; (brown) Balmoral Reef plate - pale brown ? bordering block; (orange) Conway Reef plate; (blue) Active subduction trenches; (yellow) Spreading centers or rifts

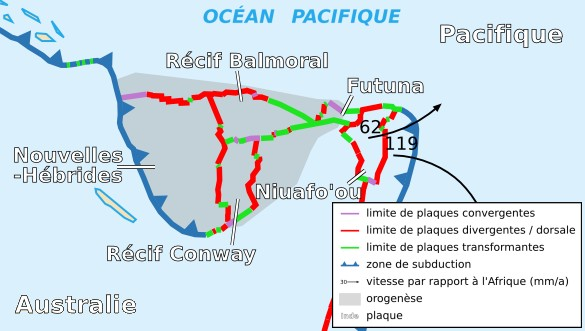
Map of the Conway Reef plate (as "Récif Conway") and its neighbouring plates (in French)

The Conway Reef plate is a small tectonic plate (microplate) located in the south Pacific west of Fiji. The western boundary is with the New Hebrides plate while the eastern is with the Australian plate. A short transform boundary also exists with the Balmoral Reef plate. Much of the plate underlies the south central portion of the North Fiji Basin.

Within the North Fiji Basin it lies between the spreading centers of the Central Spreading Ridge on the west and the West Fiji Ridge on the east. The plate is rotating counterclockwise with respect to all of its neighbours.

The plate's existence was first modelled in 2003 by Bird. Its boundaries and angular momentum were further defined in 2011 and 2018 with refinement of tectonic plate deformation and strain rate.

The region is complex and may well have several other microplates or blocks.

== See also ==
- North Fiji Basin
