= Afghanistan earthquake =

Afghanistan earthquake may refer to:

- February 1998 Afghanistan earthquake
- May 1998 Afghanistan earthquake
- 1999 Afghanistan earthquake
- April 2009 Afghanistan earthquake
- October 2009 Afghanistan earthquake
- 2010 Afghanistan earthquake
- 2012 Afghanistan earthquakes
- 2016 Afghanistan earthquake
- January 2022 Afghanistan earthquakes
- June 2022 Afghanistan earthquake
- September 2022 Afghanistan earthquake, M_{w} 5.1, near Jalalabad
- 2023 Badakhshan earthquake, M_{ww} 6.5
- 2023 Herat earthquakes, M_{ww} 6.3
- 2025 Kunar earthquake, M_{w} 6.0, Nangarhar and Kunar provinces, killed hundreds
- 2025 Balkh earthquake, M_{ww} 6.3
