= 2009 Afghanistan earthquake =

2009 Afghanistan earthquake may refer to:

- April 2009 Afghanistan earthquake
- October 2009 Afghanistan earthquake

== See also ==
- Afghanistan earthquake (disambiguation)
