= 2023 Afghanistan earthquake =

2023 Afghanistan earthquake may refer to:

- 2023 Badakhshan earthquake
- 2023 Herat earthquakes

== See also ==
- Afghanistan earthquake
