= List of earthquakes in Afghanistan =

Map of earthquakes in Afghanistan 1900– (map data)

This is a list of earthquakes in Afghanistan. Fairly moderate earthquakes have been very destructive in the country, particularly during the 21st century. Much of the population resides in informal and adobe houses, which are vulnerable to earthquakes.

== Tectonic setting ==
Afghanistan is situated near the southern extent of the Eurasian plate.

== Earthquakes ==
Date	Place	Lat	Lon	Deaths	Injuries	Mag.	MMI	Comments
2025-11-03	Balkh	36.589	67.484	31	1,156	6.2 M_{w}	VII	
2025-09-04	Kunar	34.719	70.791	2	41	5.6 M_{w}	VIII	Aftershock
2025-08-31	Kunar	34.519	70.734	3,000	4,000	6.0 M_{w}	IX	Extreme damage
2023-10-07	Herat	34.610	61.924	1,489	2,444	6.3 M_{w}	VIII	Four earthquakes and aftershocks/Extreme damage.
2023-03-21	Badakhshan	36.523	70.979	21	424	6.5 M_{w}	V	Moderate damage, 21 deaths including 10 in Pakistan.
2022-09-06	Badakhshan	36.649	70.629	6	9	4.8 M_{w}	III	Further damage
2022-09-04	Kunar	34.662	70.701	18	42	5.1 M_{w}	VII	Moderate damage
2022-07-18	Khost	33.108	69.470		44	5.1 M_{w}	V	Additional damage / aftershock
2022-06-24	Khyber Pakhtunkhwa, Pakistan	33.017	69.538	5	11	4.2 M_{w}	VII	All deaths in Afghanistan / aftershock
2022-06-21	Khost	33.092	69.514	1,163	2,976	6.2 M_{w}	IX	Extreme damage/landslides
2022-05-24	Hindu Kush	36.118	70.293	2	1	4.9 M_{w}	VI	Minor damage
2022-02-05	Hindu Kush	36.445	71.117	3		5.8 M_{w}	IV	
2022-01-17	Badghis	34.946	63.580	30	49	5.3 M_{w}	VI	
2018-01-31	Hindu Kush	36.54	70.82	2	22	6.1 M_{w}	IV	
2016-04-10	Ishkashim			6	28	6.6 M_{w}	V	
2015-10-26	Hindu Kush	36.52	70.37	399	2,536	7.5 M_{w}	VII	
2013-04-24	Jalalabad-Mehtar Lam	34.53	70.22	18	130	5.6 M_{w}	V	
2012-06-11	Baghlan	36.05	69.30	75	-	5.4, 5.7	V	Doublet
2010-04-18	Samangan	35.71	67.68	11	-	5.6	VI	
2009-10-22	Hindu Kush	36.52	70.95	5	-	6.2	V	
2009-04-16	Near Kabul	34.19	70.08	19	51	5.2 M_{w}	VI	Doublet
2005-12-12	Hindu Kush	36.28	71.11	5	1	6.5 M_{w}	V	
2002-03-25	Hindu Kush	35.93	69.19	2,000	3,000	6.1 M_{w}	VII	
2002-03-03	Hindu Kush	36.5	70.48	166	Some	7.4 M_{w}	VI	
1999-02-11	Kabul	34.3	69.36	70	500	6.0 M_{w}	VI	
1998-05-30	Takhar	37.17	70.09	4,000–4,500	10,001	6.5 M_{w}	VI	
1998-02-04	Takhar	37.17	70.14	2,323	818	5.9 M_{w}	VI	
1994-05-01	Mazar-i-Sharif	36.901	67.163	160	330	6.1 M_{w}		Severe damage
1991-04-20	Badakhshan	36.416	70.912			4.1 M_{w}	III	100 houses damaged
1991-04-08	Badakhshan	37.457	68.273	1	6	5.5 M_{w}	VII	Moderate damage
1991-01-31	Hindu Kush	35.99	70.42	848	200	6.9 M_{w}	VII	Extreme damage
1990-07-13	Hindu Kush	36.415	70.789	43	2	6.4 M_{w}	IV	Deaths due to avalanche in Tajikistan.
1985-07-29	Hindu Kush	36.190	70.896	5	38	7.4 M_{w}	VIII	Severe damage in Pakistan and Tajikistan as well.
1984-02-16	Hindu Kush	36.431	70.826	4	13	6.4 M_{w}	IV	Severe damage
1984-02-01	Nangarhar	34.616	70.484	1	35	6.1	VII	Minor damage
1983-12-31	Hindu Kush	36.37	70.34	12–26	60–483	7.2 M_{b}	VII	Severe damage
1982-12-16	Baghlan	36.148	69.011	450	Many	6.6 M_{s}	VI	Severe damage
1981-06-13	Samangan	36.176	67.827	1	2	5.5 M_{w}	VI	
1956-09-16	Logar	33.997	69.667			6.5 M_{w}	VIII	
1956-06-09	Bamyan	35.155	67.607	570–900	2,000–2,500	7.3 M_{w}	VII	Widely felt across the country
1921-11-15	Hindu Kush	36.202	70.711			7.8 M_{w}	V	
1842-02-19	Jalalabad	34.4	70.5	500				Severe damage
818-05-15	Hindu Kush	36.8	66.2	Many		7.5 M_{s}	VIII	Severe damage
Note: The inclusion criteria for adding events are based on WikiProject Earthquakes' notability guideline that was developed for stand alone articles. The principles described also apply to lists. In summary, only damaging, injurious, or deadly events should be recorded.

== Gallery ==
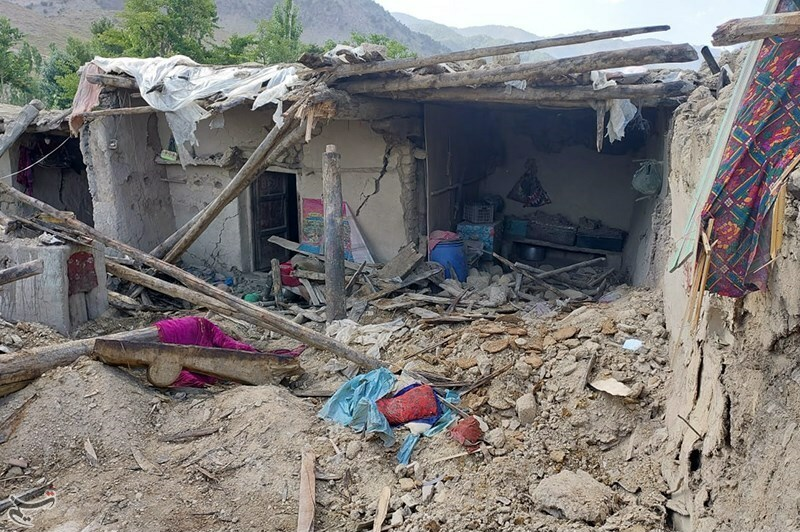
A house collapsed in Khost Province by the June 2022 Afghanistan earthquake.

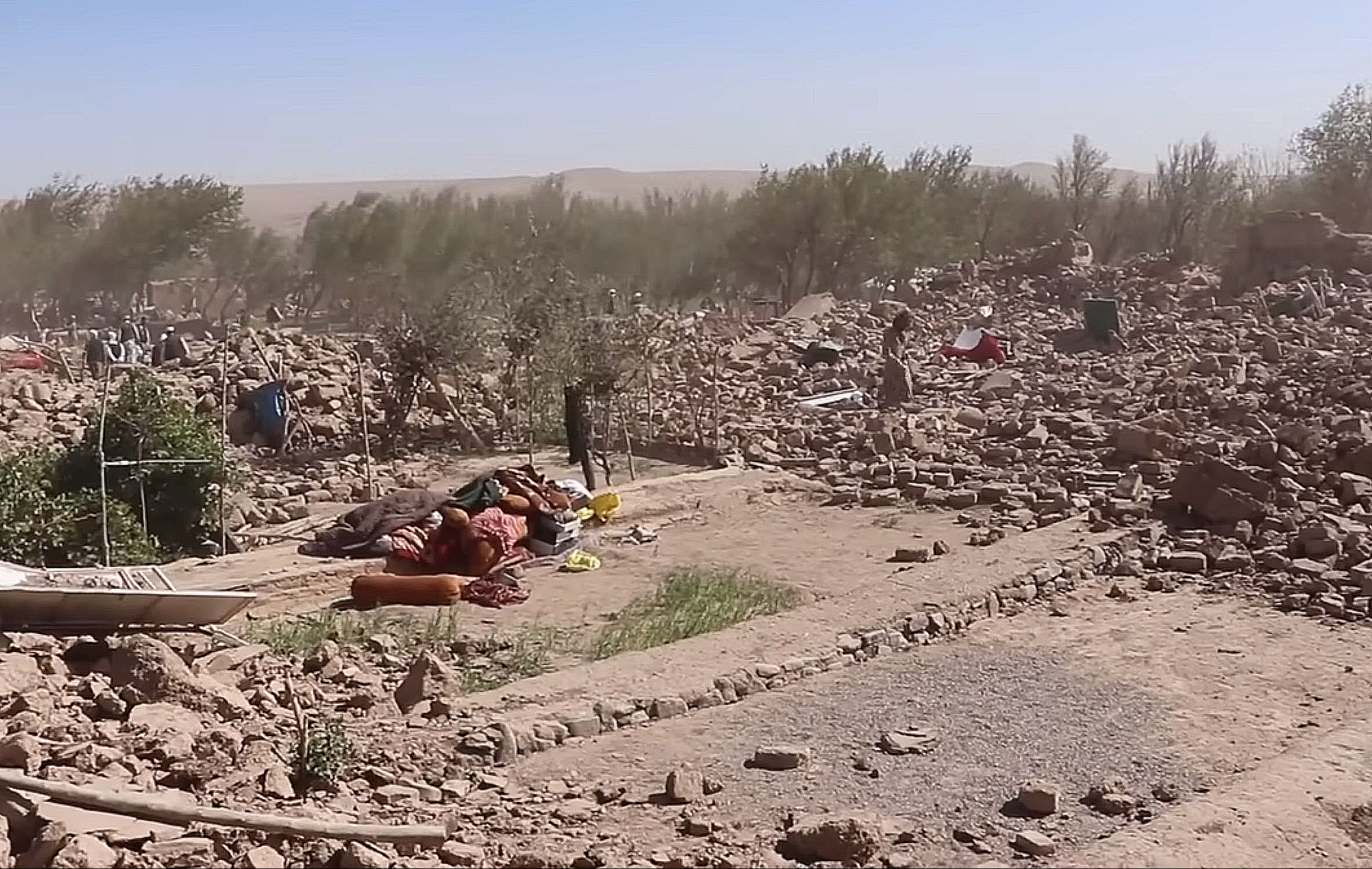
A destroyed village in Herat by the 2023 Herat earthquake.

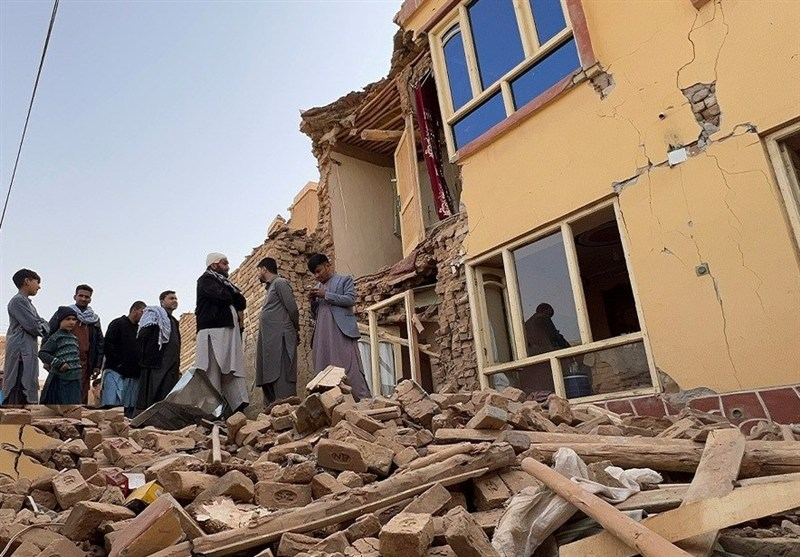
Damage to homes in Samangan Province by the 2025 Balkh earthquake.

== See also ==
- Geology of Afghanistan
