= 2016 Afghanistan earthquake =

Severe earthquake centered near Ashkasham, Afghanistan

- Location within Afghanistan
- UTC time: 2016-04-10 10:28:58
- ISC event: 608545133
- USGS-ANSS: ComCat
- Local date: 10 April 2016
- Local time: 2:58 p.m
- Magnitude: 6.6 M_{W}
- Depth: 210.4 km (130.7 mi)
- Epicenter: 36°28′23″N 71°7′52″E
- Areas affected: Afghanistan, Pakistan
- Max. intensity: MMI V (Moderate)
- Casualties: 6 dead, 46 injured

The 2016 Afghanistan earthquake was a magnitude 6.6 earthquake which struck 39 km (24 mi) west-southwest of Ashkasham on April 10, at a depth of 210.4 km (130.7 mi). The shock had a maximum intensity of V (Moderate). The earthquake killed at least 5 people in Pakistan's Khyber Pakhtunkhwa province and one in Gilgit Baltistan. A further 46 people were injured in both provinces. The tremors shook up Peshawar, Chitral, Swat, Gilgit, Faisalabad and Lahore. The Himalayas is one of earth's most seismically active regions. The tremors were felt in Delhi, National Capital Region, Kashmir and Uttarakhand. In Delhi, some 1,000 kilometers (620 miles) from the epicentre, the Delhi Metro was temporarily halted.

Two aftershocks were felt, with magnitudes of 4.1 and 4.2. There were additionally at least 10 foreshocks felt, with the largest having a magnitude of 4.5 on April 8, 2016.

== See also ==
- Lists of 21st-century earthquakes
- List of earthquakes in 2016
- List of earthquakes in Afghanistan
- List of earthquakes in Pakistan
