= 1956 Baghlan earthquake =

Earthquake in Afghanistan

1956 Afghanistan earthquake
- Location within Afghanistan
- UTC time: 1956-06-09 23:13:55
- ISC event: 888345
- USGS-ANSS: ComCat
- Local date: 10 June 1956
- Local time: 03:43
- Magnitude: 7.3 M_{w}
- Depth: 25 km (16 mi)
- Epicenter: 35.155°N 67.607°E
- Type: Oblique-slip
- Areas affected: Afghanistan
- Max. intensity: MMI VIII (Severe)–MMI IX (Violent)
- Casualties: Deaths; Reported: 570–900; Afghan Embassy reported: 300; Injured; Reported: 2,000–2,500; Afghan Embassy reported: 200

The 1956 Afghanistan earthquake occurred in the early morning of 10 June 1956, causing considerable damage and casualties in the area of Kabul, Bamyan and the Hindu Kush mountain range. It had a magnitude of 7.3 on the surface-wave magnitude scale. The total number of deaths were between 300 and as high as 900. According to Radio Afghanistan it was the heaviest registered earthquake ever in Afghanistan.

== Earthquake ==
It had a magnitude of 7.3 on the surface-wave magnitude scale at a depth of 25 km (16 mi). A foreshock was recorded one day prior to the mainshock. The foreshock occurred in Sayghan District, Kahmard District and Bamyan. Five aftershocks followed the mainshock within the next two days. The location of these events delineated a 50 km (31 mi) rupture length trending northeast. The northeast trend was also consistent with the meizoseismal area where the Mercalli intensity was VIII–IX (Severe–Violent). Rupture occurred north of the Herat Fault; a 1,100 km (680 mi) long strike-slip fault trending east–west; no major earthquakes have been associated with the fault in the instrumental period. Many aftershocks followed a week after the mainshock.

== Impact ==
The most affected areas were Kabul, Bamyan and the Hindu Kush mountain range. In the affected areas all communication method and infrastructure was destroyed. In the Kabul area, thousands of houses collapsed, including some government buildings. Villages were destroyed by landslides and rockslides; hundreds of houses were washed away by floods in the Kunar Valley. The earthquake caused the landscape to change. The large rocks fell into the river valley, altering the course of the river. Due to the damaged infrastructure, traffic was blocked in many affected areas.

In initial reports no number of victims could be given, as information was limited because all communication was destroyed in the affected area. Ten people were killed due to a bridge that collapsed. As of 14 June, four days after the first earthquake, according to Radio Afghanistan at least hundred people were killed, 600 were missing and thousands were injured. The next day the number of deaths were reported between 60 and 70. 17 June, a week after the earthquake Radio Afghanistan reported around 270 deaths. The next day 2500 new victims were announced, of whom 300 deaths. In one of the affected areas 140 people were killed and 900 injured due to heavy floods. In another part of the valley there were 160 people killed and 1,000 injured. The total number of deaths reported by media was as high as 570 to 900, while the total number of injured people were reported to be 2,000–2,500, The Afghan embassy reported 300 deaths and 200 injuries.

== Response ==
Relief work was carried out by Hilal Ahmar. Coordination was done by officials of the Ministries of health and public works. Afghanistan received international aid. The Netherlands Red Cross sent, with transport help of KLM, aid to the victims. Pakistan offered doctors and medication.

== See also ==
- List of earthquakes in 1956
- List of earthquakes in Afghanistan
