= 2023 Badakhshan earthquake =

Earthquake in Afghanistan and Pakistan

- Location within Afghanistan Location within South Asia
- UTC time: 2023-03-21 16:47:23
- ISC event: 625897867
- USGS-ANSS: ComCat
- Local date: 2023-03-21
- Local time: 21:17 AFT (UTC+04:30) 21:47 PKT (UTC+05:00)
- Magnitude: 6.5 M_{w}
- Depth: 187.6 km (116.6 mi)
- Epicenter: 36.523°N 70.979°E
- Areas affected: Afghanistan, Pakistan, India, Tajikistan, Kazakhstan
- Max. intensity: MMI V (Moderate)
- Landslides: Yes
- Casualties: 21 dead, 424 injured (Note: Ten fatalities and 80 injuries in Afghanistan, 11 fatalities and 343 injuries in Pakistan, and one injury in India.)

On 21 March 2023, a magnitude 6.5 earthquake struck Badakhshan Province, Afghanistan, with an intermediate depth of approximately 187 km (116 mi). The epicenter of the earthquake was 40 km (25 mi) south-southeast of Jurm. At least 21 people were killed in Afghanistan and neighboring Pakistan.

== Tectonic setting ==
The Himalayas, partially formed by the collision of tectonic plates, are prone to devastating earthquakes. Afghanistan is situated near the southern extent of the Eurasian plate. Most of these earthquakes are associated with reverse, thrust, or strike-slip faulting. Large earthquakes with magnitudes of up to 7.5 have occurred in the region with an average recurrence interval of 15 years. These earthquakes correspond to reverse faulting at a depth of 170 to 280 km (110 to 170 mi). These earthquakes, rather than occurring at a plate boundary, are sourced from within the Indian plate as it dives beneath the Hindu Kush. As the tectonic slab of the Indian plate descends at a near-vertical angle into the mantle, it stretches and begins to "tear", eventually leading to a slab detachment. This action results in stress accommodation along faults that produces earthquakes when ruptured. Smaller shallow focus earthquakes are also observed in the region, particularly associated with north–south trending zones of right lateral strike-slip, such as the Chaman Fault, with an increasing degree of shortening to the north, together accommodating the highly oblique convergence between the Indian and the Eurasian plates.

== Earthquake ==
The United States Geological Survey reported a magnitude of M_{ww}6.5, while the Pakistan Meteorological Department said the earthquake had a magnitude of 6.5. The earthquake was initially reported inaccurately as M_{w}7.7. Shaking was felt over an area 1,000 km (620 mi) wide by approximately 285 million people in Pakistan, India, Uzbekistan, Tajikistan, Kazakhstan, Kyrgyzstan, Afghanistan, and Turkmenistan, according to the European-Mediterranean Seismological Centre.

== Impact ==
=== Afghanistan ===
At least 10 people were killed, 80 others injured, and more than 665 houses destroyed in nine provinces of Afghanistan. Two people died, 25 others were injured and 22 houses collapsed in Laghman Province. In Takhar Province, 20 buildings collapsed, one person died and five others were injured. In Panjshir Province, three buildings were seriously damaged, and three people injured. In Badakhshan Province, where the epicenter of the earthquake was located, one person was injured, 70 buildings were destroyed and 50 were damaged. In Kabul Province, one person died and one house was destroyed. Five houses collapsed in Nangarhar Province.

=== Pakistan ===
Tremors were felt in Islamabad, Rawalpindi, Lahore, Quetta, and Peshawar. In Swat District of Khyber Pakhtunkhwa province, a teenager was killed from a collapsing wall and a police station was damaged. Two people also died due to a wall collapse in the district, while another falling wall killed a child. Power outages, severe damage and injuries to 250 people were reported in the district. In Manshera, a woman died of a heart attack apparently linked to the earthquake. In Lower Dir District, one person died in a stampede related to the earthquake, a man and a woman were killed due to wall collapses and 43 people were injured from various causes. The Karakoram Highway was closed due to blockages from landslides. In Islamabad, one person died of a heart attack and a multi-storey apartment building was damaged. There was also a fatality in Bajaur District. Buildings were damaged in Rawalpindi, including six which were deemed at risk of collapse and were evacuated. Two people were injured and another two went unconscious in the city, all due to panic. In Abbottabad, one person died from panic and fear. In Mardan District, the wall of a police station collapsed, causing an injury. Five people were injured in Swabi District. Dozens of houses collapsed and 40 people were injured in Buner District.

=== India ===
Tremors from the earthquake were felt across parts of North India, particularly in Jammu and Kashmir, Punjab, Himachal Pradesh, Haryana, Rajasthan, Uttarakhand and the National Capital Region. Disruptions of electricity and mobile services occurred in some parts of Jammu and Kashmir. A woman was injured after her house collapsed in Poonch, with reports of cracks in other houses and a wall collapse in the town and in the neighboring Nowshera. Cracks were reported in some houses in the state capital Srinagar. In Delhi, some buildings were reported to have cracked or tilted.

=== Other countries ===
In Rudaki District, Tajikistan, a house was damaged, causing its occupants to evacuate. Despite the relatively mild intensity, the earthquake damaged a high-rise building in Shymkent, Kazakhstan, in the form of cracks on walls and falling plaster.

== See also ==
- List of earthquakes in 2023
- List of earthquakes in Pakistan
- List of earthquakes in Afghanistan
- List of earthquakes in India
- 2002 Hindu Kush earthquakes
- 2015 Hindu Kush earthquake
- 2023 Herat earthquakes
