= Geology of Afghanistan =

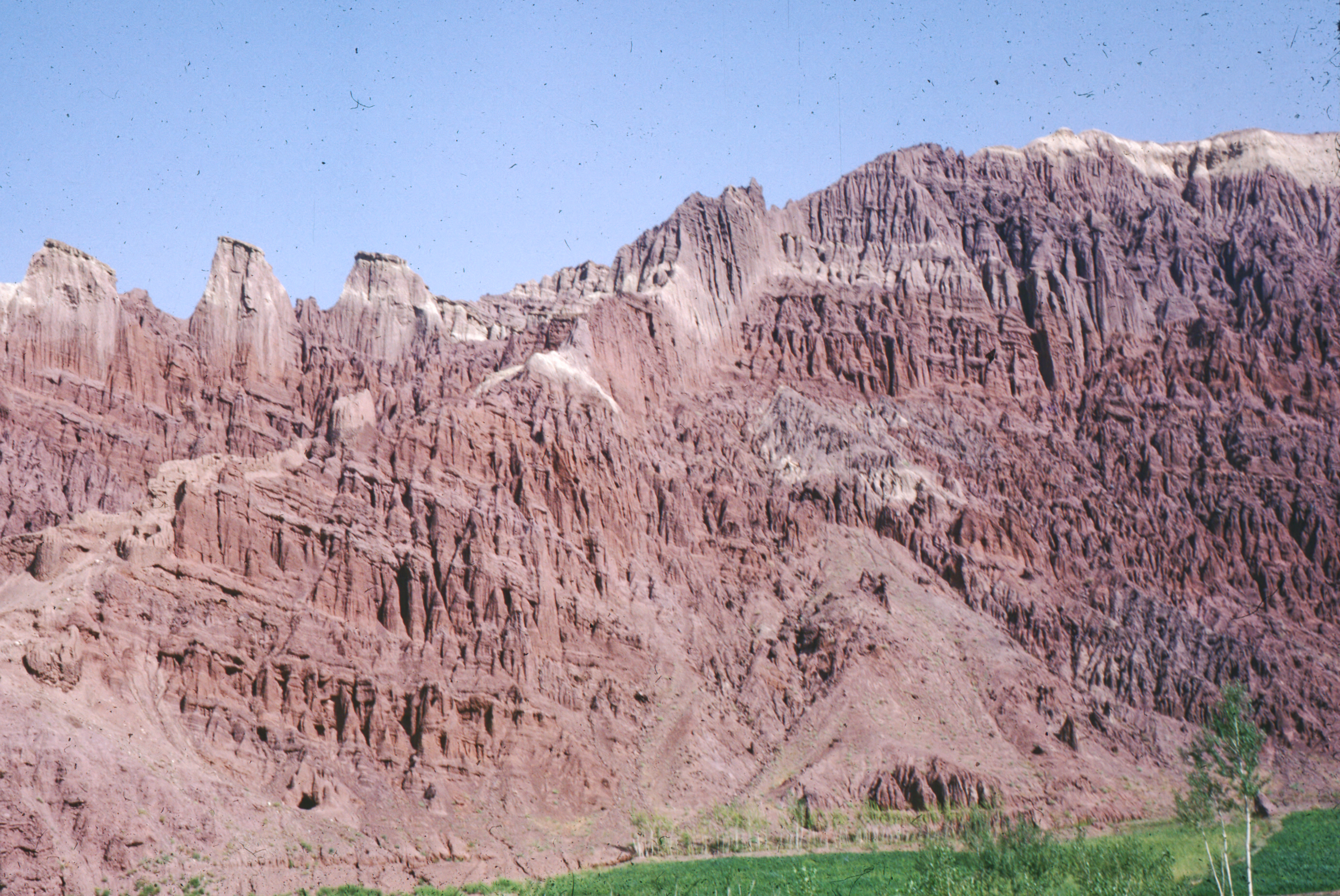
Rugged mountain rock outcrop in Afghanistan

The geology of Afghanistan includes nearly one billion year old rocks from the Precambrian. The region experienced widespread marine transgressions and deposition during the Paleozoic and Mesozoic, that continued into the Cenozoic with the uplift of the Hindu Kush mountains.

== Stratigraphy and geologic history ==
=== Precambrian (4540–539 million years ago) ===
Afghanistan is underlain by Precambrian metamorphic rocks, which form high regions in the center of the country and in the Hindu Kush. The Central Afghan Swell, stretching from the Sabzak Pass near Herat in the west to the Little Pamir in the northeast, is the northernmost structural high, encompassing metamorphic rocks. The swell is connected to the Hindu Kush by Precambrian rocks in Koh-i-Baba. The Shahrestan swell between Kabul and Malestan follows a northeast trend, but also extends to the southwest as the Malestan swell. Precambrian rocks outcrop locally west of Jalalabad, close to Kabul and Khost, and are likely present in the Safed Koh Range. The Precambrian rocks of Afghanistan include phyllite, greenschist, garnet-mica schist, and partially-melted gneiss that experienced anatexis. Near Kabul, schists (938 million years old) have been found, associated with much younger gneisses (644 million years old). In general, the Precambrian rocks in the Hindu Kush and Safed Koh Range are poorly studied.

=== Paleozoic (539–251 million years ago) ===
Fifty to 60 meter thick limestones, overlying 70 meter thick dolomite, in the Panjao region host Late Cambrian trilobite fossils, dating to the time at which multi-cellular life proliferated. Non-fossil bearing sandstone, shale and limestone, southwest of Kabul are up to 680 meters thick, pinching out in the north. The formation underlies fossil-bearing sediments.

South of the Afghan swell are several outcrops of Ordovician rocks. A researcher in 1970 reported conodont fossils from the Tremadocian in a one kilometer thick quartzite, shale and limestone formation. Close to Surkh Bum, Cambrian limestone is disconformably overlain by 60 meters of Ordovician shale and limestone, while to the southwest of Kabul in the Logar Valley region quartzite and shale ranges between 850 meters and 1.4 kilometers thick. Sediments 2.2 kilometers thick are present in the Dasht-i-Newar area, although they are not present in the east and southeast. Silurian rocks, such as 40 meters of black shale and limestone at Jalalabad, are only found in eastern Afghanistan. Ludlovian age limestone with orthocerid fossils outcrops in the upper Logar Valley. In the Dasht-i-Newar area, Silurian and Early Devonian clastic rocks grow coarser as it thickens from 650 meters of sandstone and shale to 2.2 kilometers of quartzite and conglomerate further east.

Devonian rocks are limited in area, but widely dispersed containing extensive fossils. Early Devonian conglomerates with interlayered dolomite and marl outcrop in the central Afghan swell and the Hindu Kush. Some conglomerates show signs of tectonic reworking. Other units include 100 meters of marl and limestone near Herat, 650 meters of the same type of rocks near Ghuk and up to 100 meters of limestone near Panjao. Devonian rocks unconformably overlap older rocks in the Logar Valley and close to Kabul, with calcareous sandstones up to 700 meters thick. In eastern Dasht-i-Nawar, 1.9 kilometer thick early Devonian quartzite and intercalated conglomerate are overlain by 550 meters of middle Devonian limestone. Late Devonian rocks are not present and an unconformity and conglomerate deposits point to a break in sedimentation.

Tournaisian and Westphalian calcareous rocks from Carboniferous are distributed across the west, ranging from 350 meters thick at Herat to 400 meters at Kotale Shutur Chun. These rocks grade to quartzite and shale to the east. In the upper Kabul valley and Dash-t-Nawar, early Carboniferous limestone is 100 to 420 meters thick, disconformably overlain by 1.5 kilometers of quartzite and shale. A similar sequence is found north of Moqor. Several other locations have Carboniferous rocks such as the western Hindu Kush, north of the Shibar Pass or north of Salang Pass. In between Do Ab and Khanabad is a three kilometer thick sequence of early Carboniferous limestone, sandstone and shale.

Afghanistan has numerous Permian rocks. In the west, south of Herat is a 150 meter sequence of dolomite and limestone. Permian rocks span the areas between the western Hindu Kush, Kandahar, Gardez, Jalalabad and Moqor. Carboniferous rocks transition to Permian sandstone and shale in the Dasht-i-Nawar and Logar valley area. A marine transgression emplaced 1.5 kilometers of limestone and dolomite and in places north of the Hindu Kush, Permian rocks lie directly on top of folded Precambrian basement.

=== Mesozoic (251–66 million years ago) ===
Triassic rocks are present north and south of the Hindu Kush-central Afghan swell area. To the south, limestone and dolomite 1.8 kilometers thick sit directly atop Permian limestones. In some places, there is no clear depositional break between the Permian and Triassic. North of the Hindu Kush, Triassic rocks unconformably overlie older rocks, with a transgressive sequence ranging between 350 meters and seven kilometers and composed of shale, sandstone and conglomerate. In the southern part of the basin, thick sequences of volcanic rock are common. Black shale near Badakshan has been found to contain extensive Triassic fossils.

In the east, Jurassic limestone, marl, shale and sandstone conformably overlies Triassic sediments. Volcanic rocks intercalate these units between Kabul and Khost. To the west, Jurassic rocks are different: mainly sandstone and shale, which are up to three kilometers thick, with subordinate limestone and marl. Close to Karkar, geologists have found 200 meter sandstone, shale and limestone sequence from the Middle Jurassic overlying coal. Researchers view the 650 meter thick sequence in the northwest as the remnants of deposition in the extinct Oxfordian age "Pamir Sea."

Like Jurassic deposits, Cretaceous rocks also differ from north to south. Between Asra and Khost, calcareous sediments interfinger with volcanic rocks. In east-central Afghanistan, 500 meters of sandstone, shale, marl and conglomerate overlies Paleozoic and Precambrian rocks. Conglomerate, greywacke and sandstone grading into limestone (rich in rudist fossils), sandstone and marl in the north and southeast suggests a large sedimentary basin. Limestone, marl and claystone up to 1.5 kilometers thick indicates a major marine transgression in the Aptian, from the north.

=== Cenozoic (66 million years ago-present) ===
South of the central Afghan swell, regional folding and faulting took place at the end of the Cretaceous and the beginning of the Cenozoic, with marine conditions only in the southeast. Around Khost, calcareous sedimentation continued until the Eocene. Beginning with a basal conglomerate, sedimentary rocks from the Paleocene through the Oligocene coarsen upwards in the southeast and between Khost and Sarobi. Nummulitic limestone and volcanic rocks intercalate with these sedimentary rocks around the edge of the basin. Paleocene and Eocene marl up to 300 meters thick interbeds with limestone and gypsum, unconformably overlying Cretaceous limestone in the north. These units are overlain by Eocene and Oligocene sequence 500 meters thick with tuff and lava intercalation.

Tectonic activity began uplifting new mountains in the Neogene, bringing folding and driving erosion into intermontane basins as well as rift valleys and plains. Reddish conglomerate, sandstone, siltstone, marl and claystone with small amount of travertine, gypsum and limestone from this age are dated to the Miocene and Pliocene. Similar sequences are found north of the Hindu Kush and the Amu Darya Depression holds up to 10 kilometers of material from the period. Clastic sedimentation continued into the last 2.6 million years of the Quaternary. Early Pleistocene and Neogene sedimentations were often covered over coarse gravels with an angular unconformity as a result of intensive uplift in the middle Pleistocene. Glacial moraines are found above 3000 meters in the Hindu Kush and some north facing mountain slopes above 5000 meters still have glaciers.

== Natural resource geology ==
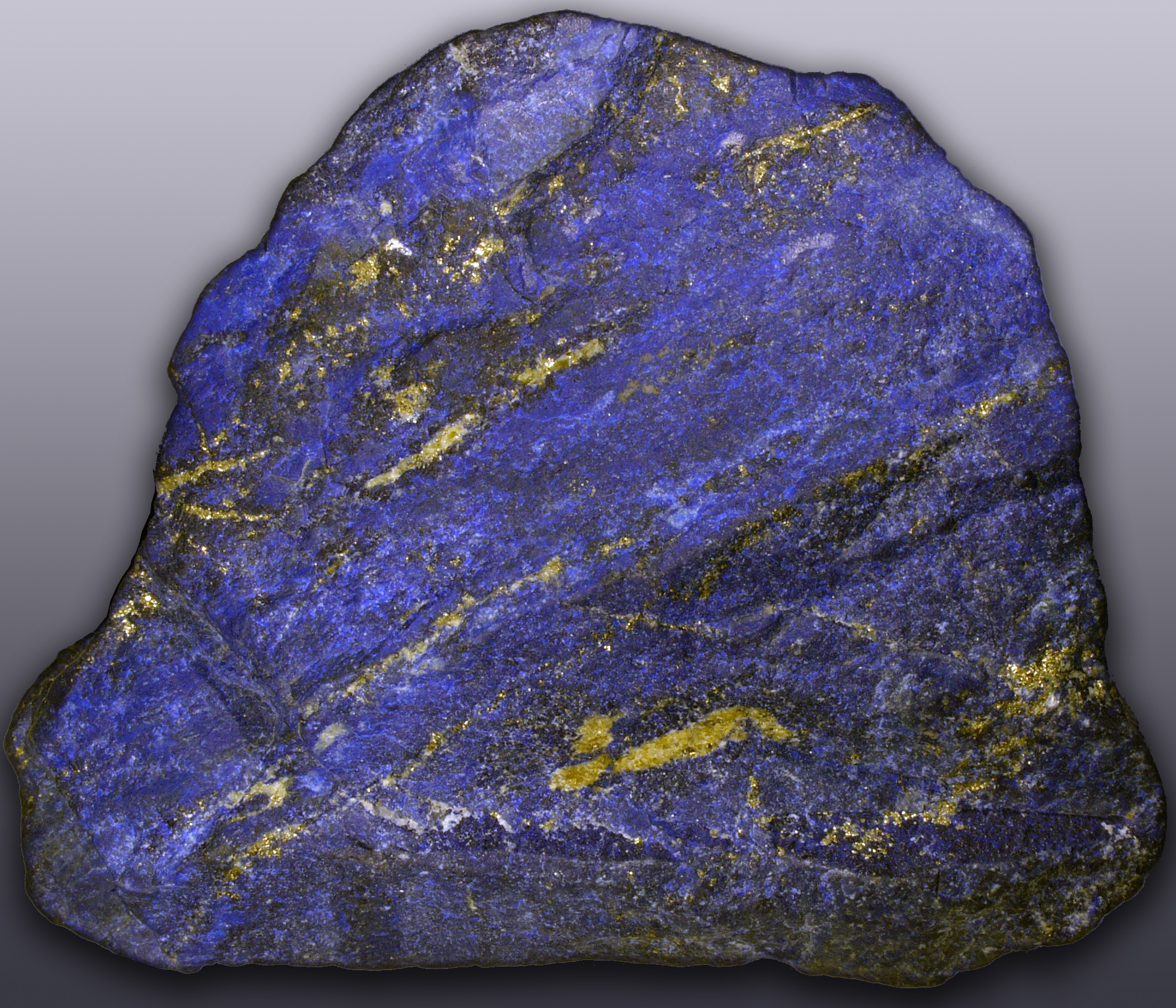
Lapis lazuli from Afghanistan

Before the Soviet invasion in 1979, mining in Afghanistan was limited to lapis lazuli, rock salt, natural gas and coal. Jurassic and Cretaceous limestones and sandstones in the north near Shibarghan contain extensive oil and natural gas—the Cretaceous gas is more than 95 percent methane. The northern Jurassic basin has 20 known coal deposits, previously mined at about 140,000 tons a year, with total reserves of around 500 million tons. The Hajigak Pass holds 110 million tons of high-grade iron ore, with a concentration of 63 percent in hematite and magnetite. The Kabul ophiolite in the Logar Valley holds a high-grade chromite deposit. Sulfur is known near Balkh, talc near Jalalabad, beryl in Nuristan and fluorite to the north of Kandahar, together with Cretaceous rock salt near Taluqan.
