= 1999 Afghanistan earthquake =

- Location within Afghanistan
- UTC time: 1999-02-11 14:08:51
- ISC event: 1451289
- USGS-ANSS: ComCat
- Local date: February 11, 1999
- Local time: 18:38
- Magnitude: 6.0 M_{wc}
- Depth: 33.0 km (20.5 mi)
- Epicenter: 34.259°N 69.364°E
- Max. intensity: MMI VI (Strong)
- Casualties: 70 dead, 500 injured, 14,000 homeless

On February 11, 1999, an earthquake with a moderate magnitude of 6.0 and depth of 33.0 km struck Wardak and Logar provinces of south Kabul, Afghanistan.

== Damage ==
Due to harsh weather conditions and dispersed settlements, it was difficult to assess the damage in the worst-hit region, which had a combined population of about 300,000 people. The most affected districts were Maidan Shar, Nirkh, and Sayedabad in Wardak, and Baraki Barak, Pul-e-Alam and Mohammad Agha in Logar. 70 people were killed 500 were injured, and 7,000 homes collapsed due to the quake. About 18,600 families were also affected. Many lives were saved due to foreshocks preceding the main tremor. The damage in the Wardak province was generally much severe than that in Logar. In the capital Kabul, damage such as collapsed mud walls and several injuries were also reported. Panic also spread across the city, as many people thought that they were being attacked by U.S. warplanes or missiles in the search for Osama bin Laden, who was based in Afghanistan.

== See also ==
- List of earthquakes in 1999
- List of earthquakes in Afghanistan
