= Lists of 21st-century earthquakes =

Earthquakes of magnitude 8.0 and greater from 1900 to 2018. The apparent 3D volumes of the bubbles are linearly proportional to their respective fatalities.

The following is a summary of significant earthquakes during the 21st century. In terms of fatalities, the 2004 Indian Ocean earthquake was the most destructive event with 227,898 confirmed fatalities, followed by the 2010 Haiti earthquake with about 160,000 fatalities, the 2008 Sichuan earthquake with 87,587 fatalities, the 2005 Kashmir earthquake suffered by Pakistan with 87,351 fatalities, and the 2023 Turkey–Syria earthquakes with 62,013 fatalities.

The 2011 Tōhoku earthquake and tsunami became the costliest natural disaster, resulting in approximately $360 billion in property damage at the time, followed by the 2023 Turkey–Syria earthquakes and the 2008 Sichuan earthquake, which resulted in $163.6 billion and $150 billion in damage, respectively.

Unless otherwise noted, times are local time and magnitudes use the moment magnitude scale (M_{w}).

== List of deadliest earthquakes ==
Rank	Event	Fatalities	Magnitude	Location	Date
1	2004 Indian Ocean earthquake and tsunami	227,898	9.2–9.3	Indonesia; Indian Ocean	December 26, 2004
2	2010 Haiti earthquake	160,000	7.0	Haiti	January 12, 2010
3	2008 Sichuan earthquake	87,587	7.9	China	May 12, 2008
4	2005 Kashmir earthquake	87,351	7.6	Pakistan; India	October 8, 2005
5	2023 Turkey–Syria earthquakes	62,013	7.8 & 7.7	Turkey; Syria	February 6, 2023
6	2003 Bam earthquake	34,000	6.6	Iran	December 26, 2003
7	2001 Gujarat earthquake	20,085	7.7	India	January 26, 2001
8	2011 Tōhoku earthquake and tsunami	19,759	9.0–9.1	Japan	March 11, 2011
9	2015 Nepal earthquake	8,964	7.8–7.9	Nepal	April 25, 2015
10	2026 Venezuela earthquakes	6,509	7.2 & 7.5	Venezuela	June 24, 2026
11	2006 Yogyakarta earthquake	5,756	6.4	Indonesia	May 26, 2006
12	2025 Myanmar earthquake	5,456	7.7–7.9	Myanmar; Thailand	March 28, 2025
13	2018 Sulawesi earthquake and tsunami	4,340	7.5–7.6	Indonesia	September 28, 2018
14	2023 Al Haouz earthquake	2,960	6.9	Morocco	September 8, 2023
15	2010 Yushu earthquake	2,698	6.9	China	April 13, 2010
16	2003 Boumerdès earthquake	2,266	6.8	Algeria	May 21, 2003
17	2021 Haiti earthquake	2,248	7.2	Haiti	August 14, 2021
18	2025 Kunar earthquake	2,217	6.0	Afghanistan	August 31, 2025
19	2002 Hindu Kush earthquakes	2,000	7.4 & 6.1	Afghanistan	March 25, 2002
20	2023 Herat earthquakes	1,482	6.3	Afghanistan	October 7, 2023
21	2005 Nias–Simeulue earthquake	1,313	8.6	Indonesia	March 28, 2005
22	June 2022 Afghanistan earthquake	1,163	6.2	Afghanistan; Pakistan	June 21, 2022
23	2009 Sumatra earthquakes	1,115	7.6 & 6.6	Indonesia	September 30, 2009

- Note: 1,000 or more fatalities

== List of largest earthquakes by magnitude ==
Rank	Event	Magnitude	Fatalities	Location	Date
1	2004 Indian Ocean earthquake	9.2–9.3	227,898	Indonesia, Sumatra, Indian Ocean	December 26, 2004
2	2011 Tōhoku earthquake	9.0–9.1	19,759	Japan, Tōhoku, Pacific Ocean	March 11, 2011
3	2010 Chile earthquake	8.8	525	Chile, Maule	February 27, 2010
3	2025 Kamchatka earthquake	8.7–8.8	1	Russia, Kamchatka	July 30, 2025
5	2005 Nias–Simeulue earthquake	8.6	1,314	Indonesia, Sumatra	March 28, 2005
5	2012 Indian Ocean earthquakes	8.6 & 8.2	10	Indonesia, Indian Ocean	April 11, 2012

- Note: Magnitude 8.5 or greater

== List of deadliest earthquakes by year ==
Year	Event	Fatalities	Magnitude	Location	Date
2001	2001 Gujarat earthquake	20,085	7.7	India	January 26
2002	2002 Hindu Kush earthquakes	1,200	6.1	Afghanistan	March 25
2003	2003 Bam earthquake	34,000	6.6	Iran	December 26
2004	2004 Indian Ocean earthquake and tsunami	227,898	9.2–9.3	Indonesia, Indian Ocean	December 26
2005	2005 Kashmir earthquake	87,351	7.6	Pakistan	October 8
2006	2006 Yogyakarta earthquake	5,782	6.4	Indonesia	May 26
2007	2007 Peru earthquake	595	8.0	Peru	August 15
2008	2008 Sichuan earthquake	87,587	7.9	China	May 12
2009	2009 Sumatra earthquakes	1,115	7.6	Indonesia	September 30
2010	2010 Haiti earthquake	160,000	7.0	Haiti	January 12
2011	2011 Tōhoku earthquake and tsunami	19,759	9.0–9.1	Japan	March 11
2012	2012 East Azerbaijan earthquakes	306	6.4	Iran	August 11
2013	2013 Balochistan earthquakes	825	7.7	Pakistan	September 24
2014	2014 Ludian earthquake	615	6.1	China	August 3
2015	2015 Nepal earthquake	8,964	7.8	Nepal	April 25
2016	2016 Ecuador earthquake	673	7.8	Ecuador	April 16
2017	2017 Iran–Iraq earthquake	630	7.3	Iran	November 12
2018	2018 Sulawesi earthquake and tsunami	4,340	7.5	Indonesia	September 28
2019	2019 Albania earthquake	51	6.4	Albania	November 26
2020	2020 Aegean Sea earthquake	119	7.0	Turkey; Greece	October 30
2021	2021 Haiti earthquake	2,248	7.2	Haiti	August 14
2022	June 2022 Afghanistan earthquake	1,163	6.2	Afghanistan; Pakistan	June 21
2023	2023 Turkey–Syria earthquakes	62,013	7.7 & 7.8	Turkey; Syria	February 6
2024	2024 Noto earthquake	732	7.5	Japan	January 1
2025	2025 Myanmar earthquake	5,456	7.7	Myanmar; Thailand	March 28
2026	2026 Venezuela earthquakes	6,509	7.2 & 7.5	Venezuela	June 24

== List of largest earthquakes by year ==
These are the largest earthquakes by magnitude per year

Year	Event	Magnitude	Fatalities	Location	Date	total M7+
2001	2001 southern Peru earthquake	8.4	145	Peru	June 23	16
2002	2002 Denali earthquake	7.9	0	United States	November 3	▼13
2003	2003 Tokachi earthquake	8.3	0	Japan	September 25	▲15
2004	2004 Indian Ocean earthquake and tsunami	9.2–9.3	227,898	Indonesia, Indian Ocean	December 26	▲16
2005	2005 Nias–Simeulue earthquake	8.6	1,313	Indonesia	March 28	▼11
2006	2006 Kuril Islands earthquake	8.3	0	Russia	November 15	11
2007	2007 Bengkulu earthquakes	8.5	23	Indonesia	September 12	▲18
2008	2008 Sichuan earthquake	7.9	87,587	China	May 12	▼12
2009	2009 Samoa earthquake and tsunami	8.1	192	Samoa	September 29	▲17
2010	2010 Chile earthquake	8.8	525	Chile	February 27	▲22
2011	2011 Tōhoku earthquake and tsunami	9.0–9.1	19,759	Japan	March 11	▼20
2012	2012 Indian Ocean earthquakes	8.6	10	Indonesia, Indian Ocean	April 11	▼17
2013	2013 Okhotsk Sea earthquake	8.3	0	Russia	May 24	▲19
2014	2014 Iquique earthquake	8.2	6	Chile	April 1	▼12
2015	2015 Illapel earthquake	8.3	14	Chile	September 16	▲19
2016	2016 Solomon Islands earthquakes	7.9	0	Solomon Islands	December 17	▼16
2017	2017 Chiapas earthquake	8.2	98	Mexico	September 8	▼7
2018	2018 Fiji earthquakes	8.2	0	Fiji	August 19	▲17
2019	2019 Peru earthquake	8.0	2	Peru	May 26	▼10
2020	July 2020 Alaska Peninsula earthquake	7.8	0	United States	July 22	▼9
2021	2021 Chignik earthquake	8.2	0	United States	July 29	▲19
2022	2022 Michoacán earthquake	7.6	2	Mexico	September 19	▼11
2022	2022 Papua New Guinea earthquake	7.6	21	Papua New Guinea	September 10	▼11
2023	2023 Turkey–Syria earthquakes	7.8	62,013	Turkey; Syria	February 6	▲19
2024	2024 Noto earthquake	7.5	703	Japan	January 1	▼10
2025	2025 Kamchatka earthquake	8.8	1	Russia	July 29	▲16
2026	2026 Mindanao earthquake	7.8	107	Philippines	June 8	▼11

== List of costliest earthquakes ==
Rank	Event	Historic cost (year)	Adjusted for inflation (year)	Magnitude	Fatalities	Location
1	2011 Tōhoku earthquake and tsunami	$360 billion (2013)	$490.9 billion (2025)	9.0–9.1	19,759	Japan
2	2023 Turkey–Syria earthquakes	$163.3 billion (2023)	$170.2 billion (2025)	7.8 & 7.7	59,488–62,013	Turkey, Syria
3	2008 Sichuan earthquake	$130 billion (2008)	$191.8 billion (2025)	7.9–8.3	87,587	China
4	2004 Chūetsu earthquake	$28 billion (2004)	$47.1 billion (2025)	6.6	68	Japan
5	2010 Canterbury earthquake & 2011 Christchurch earthquake	$27.9 billion (2015)	$37.4 billion (2025)	7.1 & 6.2	187	New Zealand
6	2016 Kumamoto earthquakes	$24–46 billion (2016)	$31.8–60.9 billion (2024)	7.0	277	Japan
7	2011 Sikkim earthquake	$22.3 billion (2011)	$31.5 billion (2025)	6.9	111	India
8	2009 L'Aquila earthquake	$16 billion (2009)	$23.7 billion (2025)	6.3	308	Italy
9	2012 Northern Italy earthquakes	$15.8 billion (2012)	$21.9 billion (2025)	6.1 & 5.8	27	Italy
10	2010 Chile earthquake	$15–30 billion (2010)	$21.8–43.7 billion (2025)	8.8	525	(Chile) Chile

== Lists of earthquakes by decade ==
- List of earthquakes 2001–2010
- List of earthquakes 2011–2020
- List of earthquakes 2021–present

== Gallery ==
21st-century earthquakes gallery

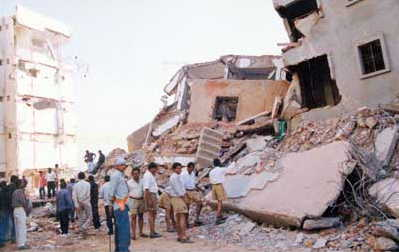
The 2001 Gujarat earthquake occurred in a part of India with relatively low seismicity, devastating the cities of Anjar and Bhuj.

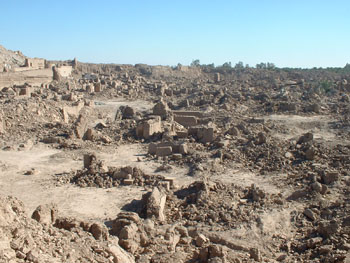
The 2003 Bam earthquake destroyed several historic landmarks, including a citadel.

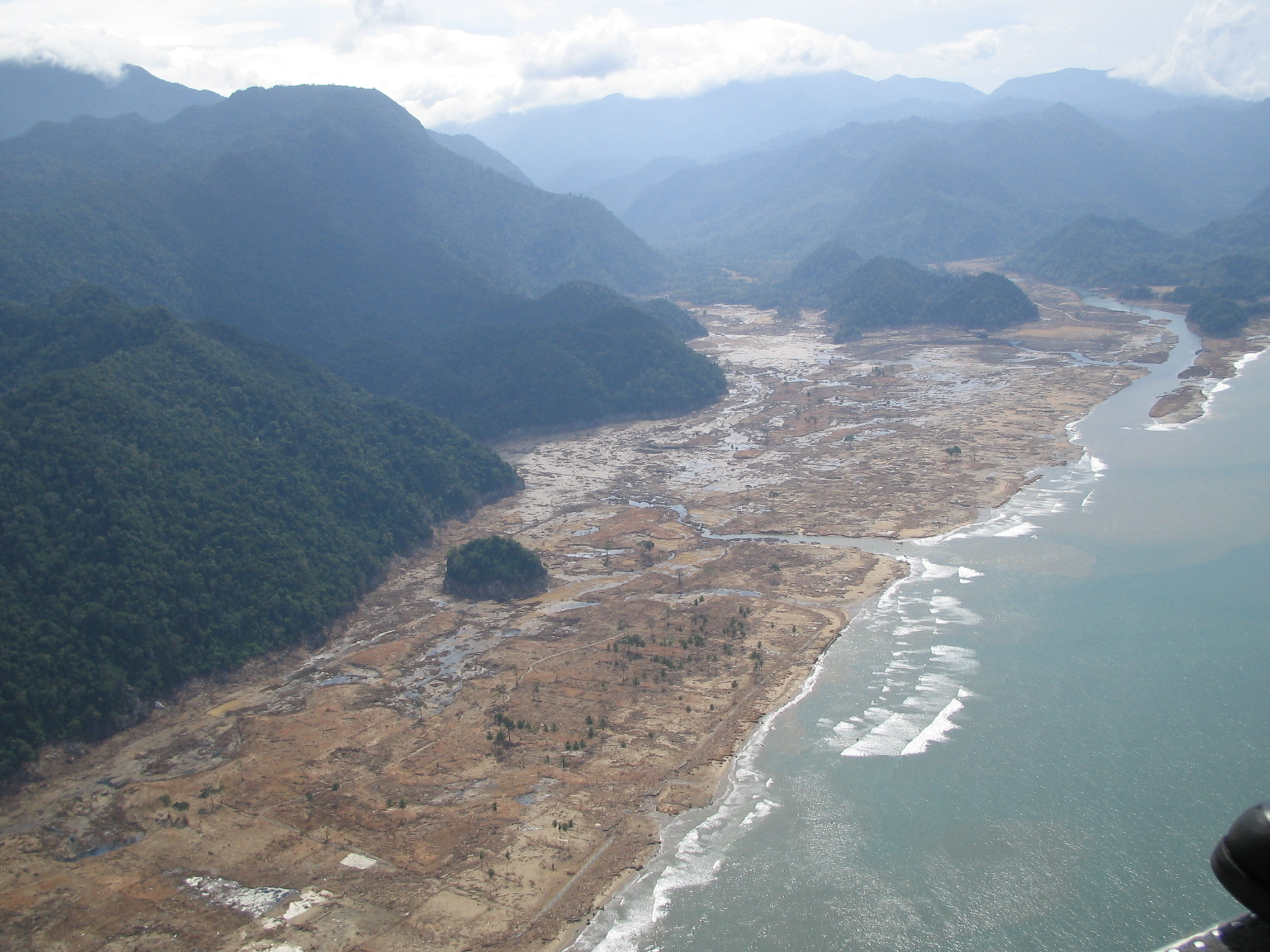
The 2004 Indian Ocean tsunami is one of the deadliest natural disasters in recent history.

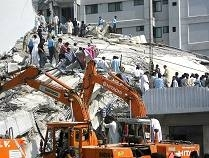
The 2005 Kashmir earthquake destroyed several towns, and caused extensive damage and landslides as far as the Pakistani capital Islamabad.

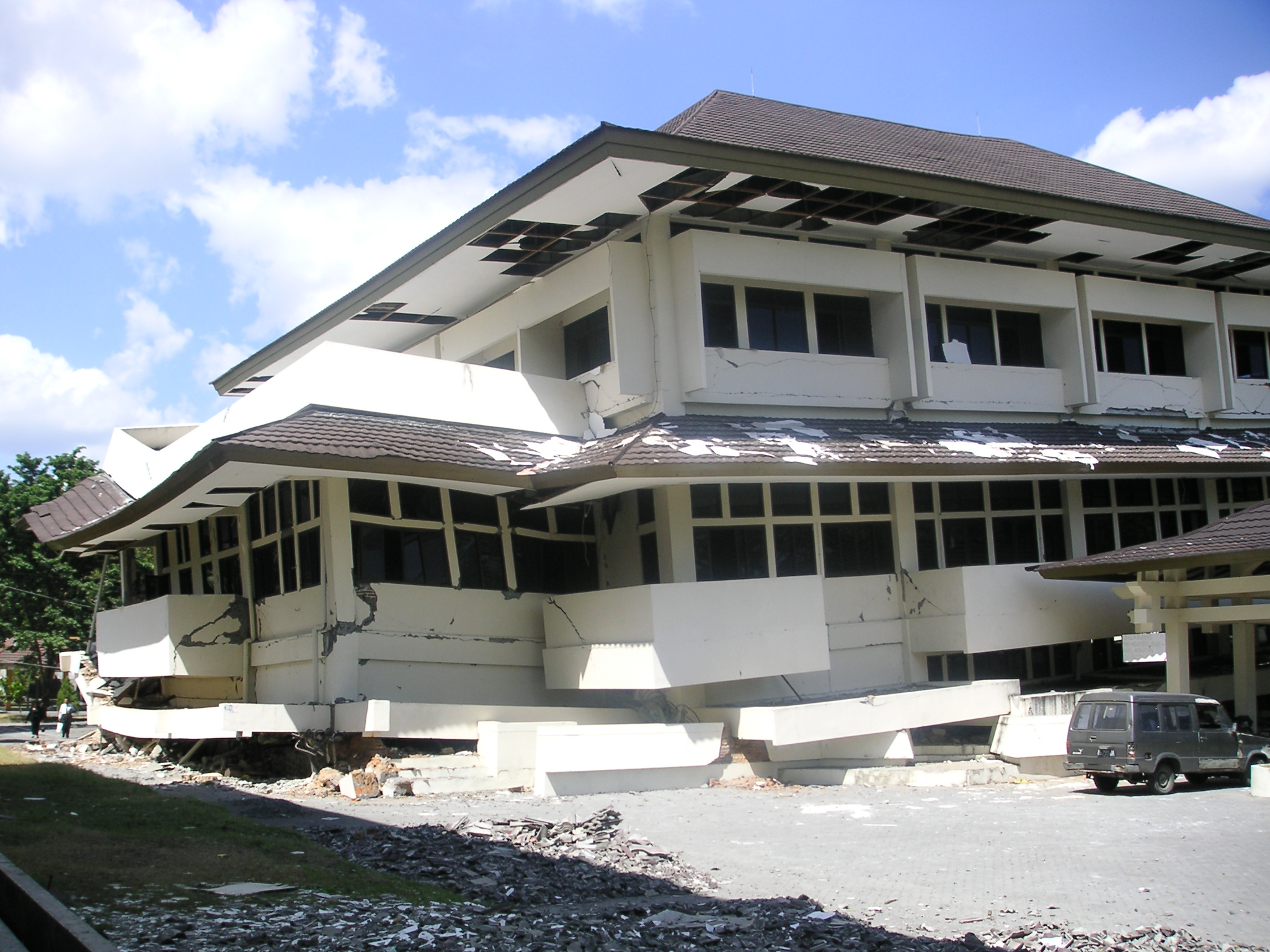
The 2006 Yogyakarta earthquake was a fairly moderate event, but caused widespread damage across eastern Java.

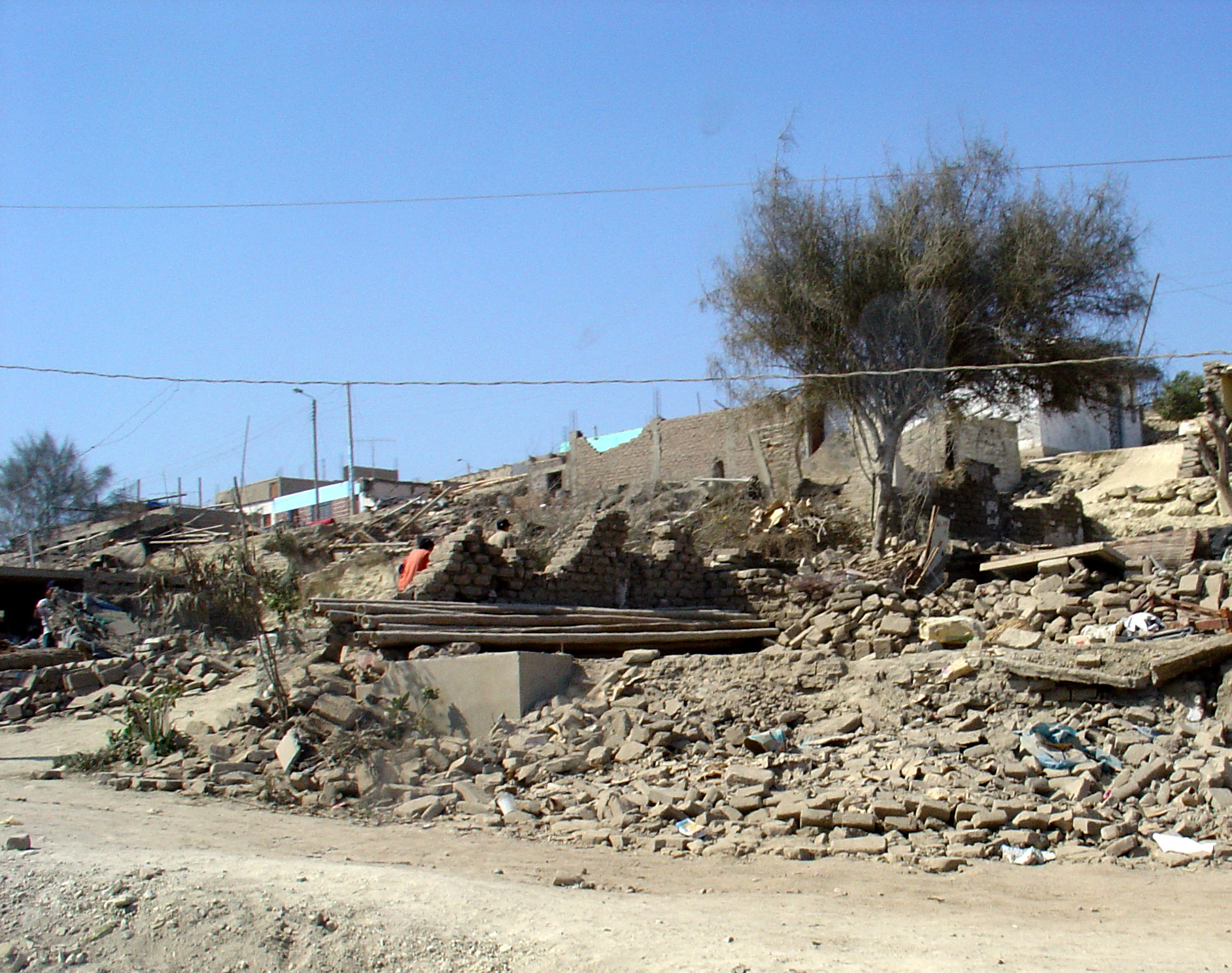
The 2007 Peru earthquake caused severe damage in the city of Pisco, and was the deadliest in the country since 1970.

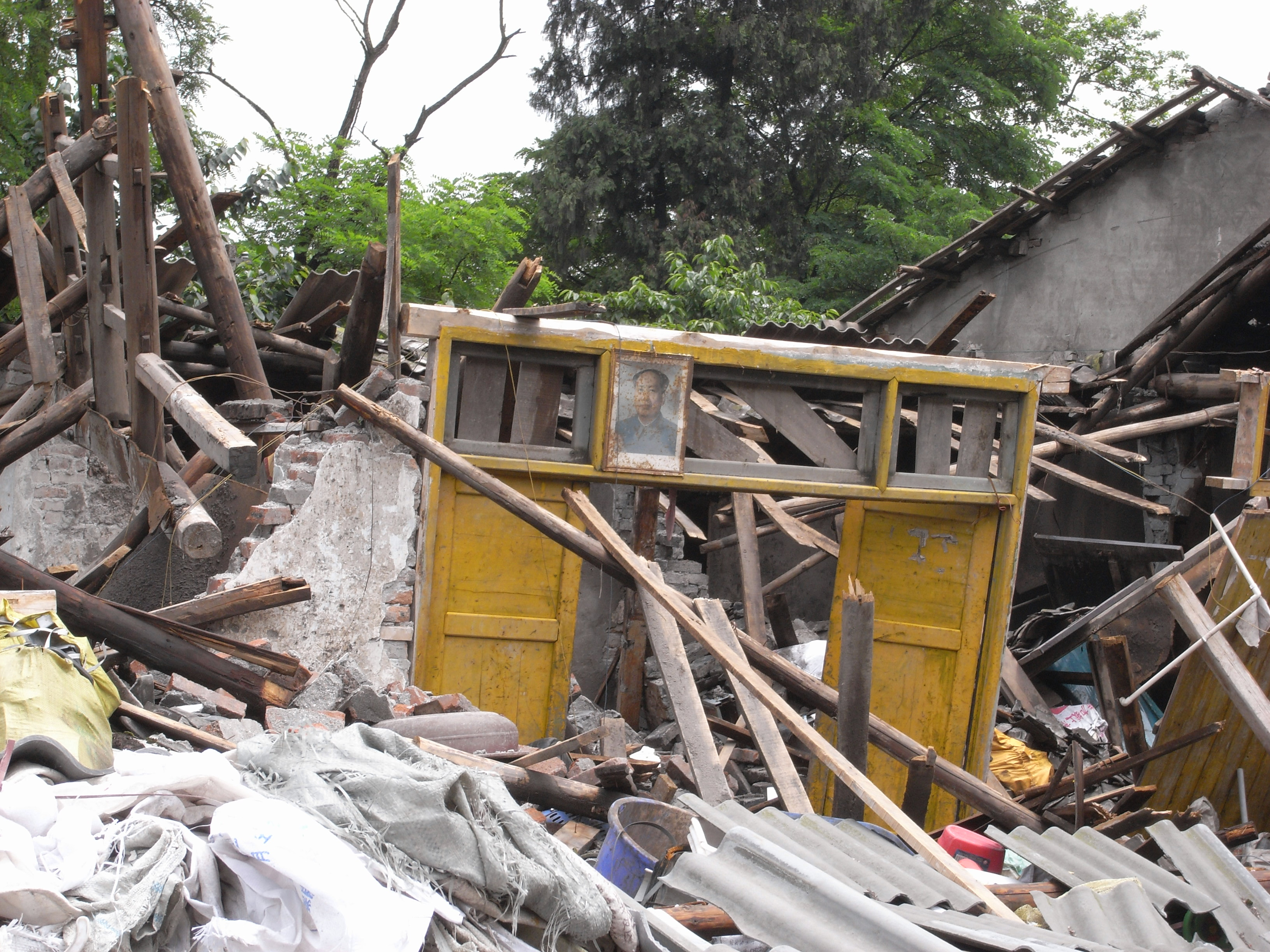
The 2008 Sichuan earthquake was the costliest earthquake in Chinese history, with over $150 billion USD.

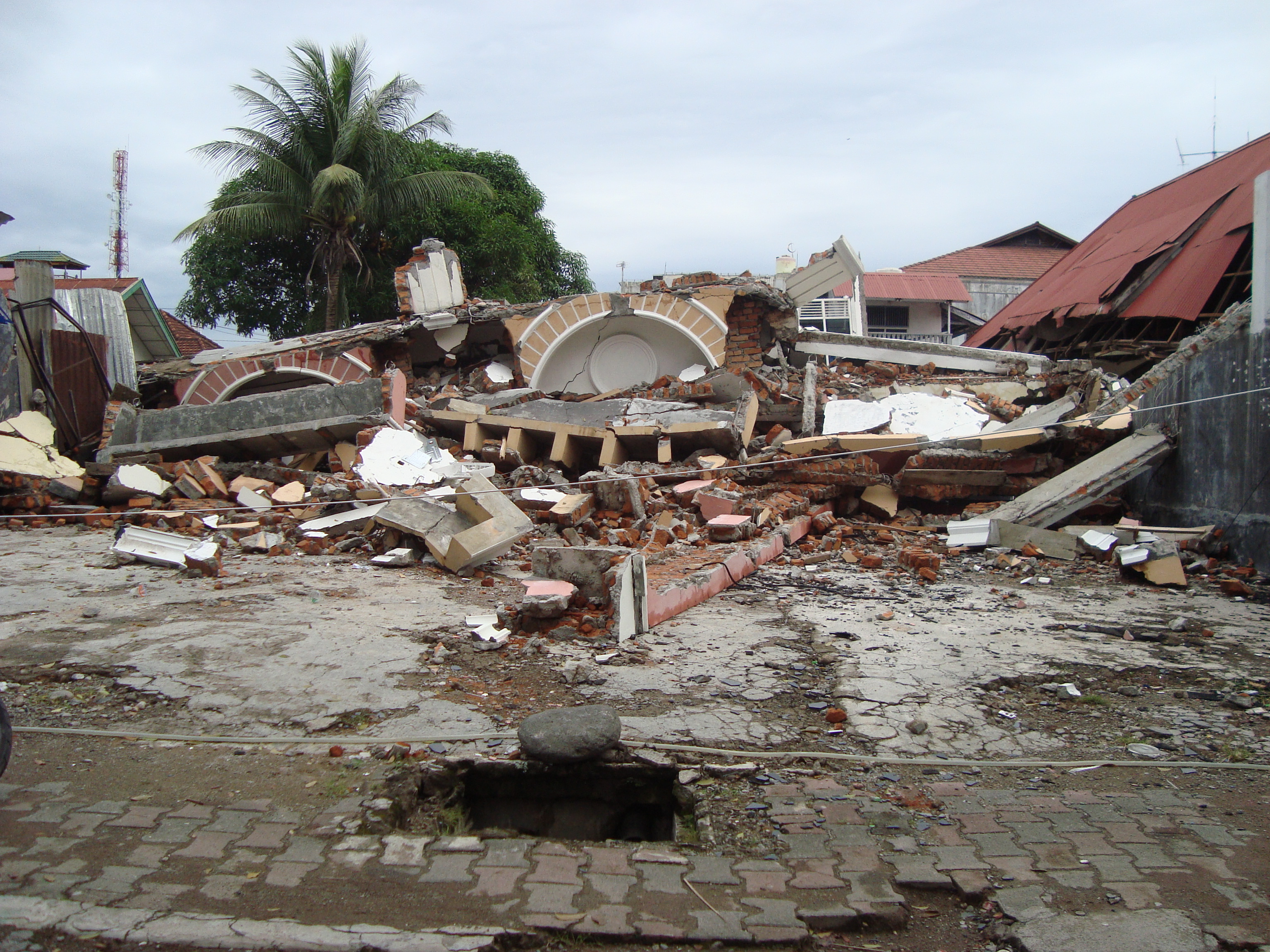
The 2009 Sumatra earthquake caused destruction, fires and liquefaction in the city of Padang.

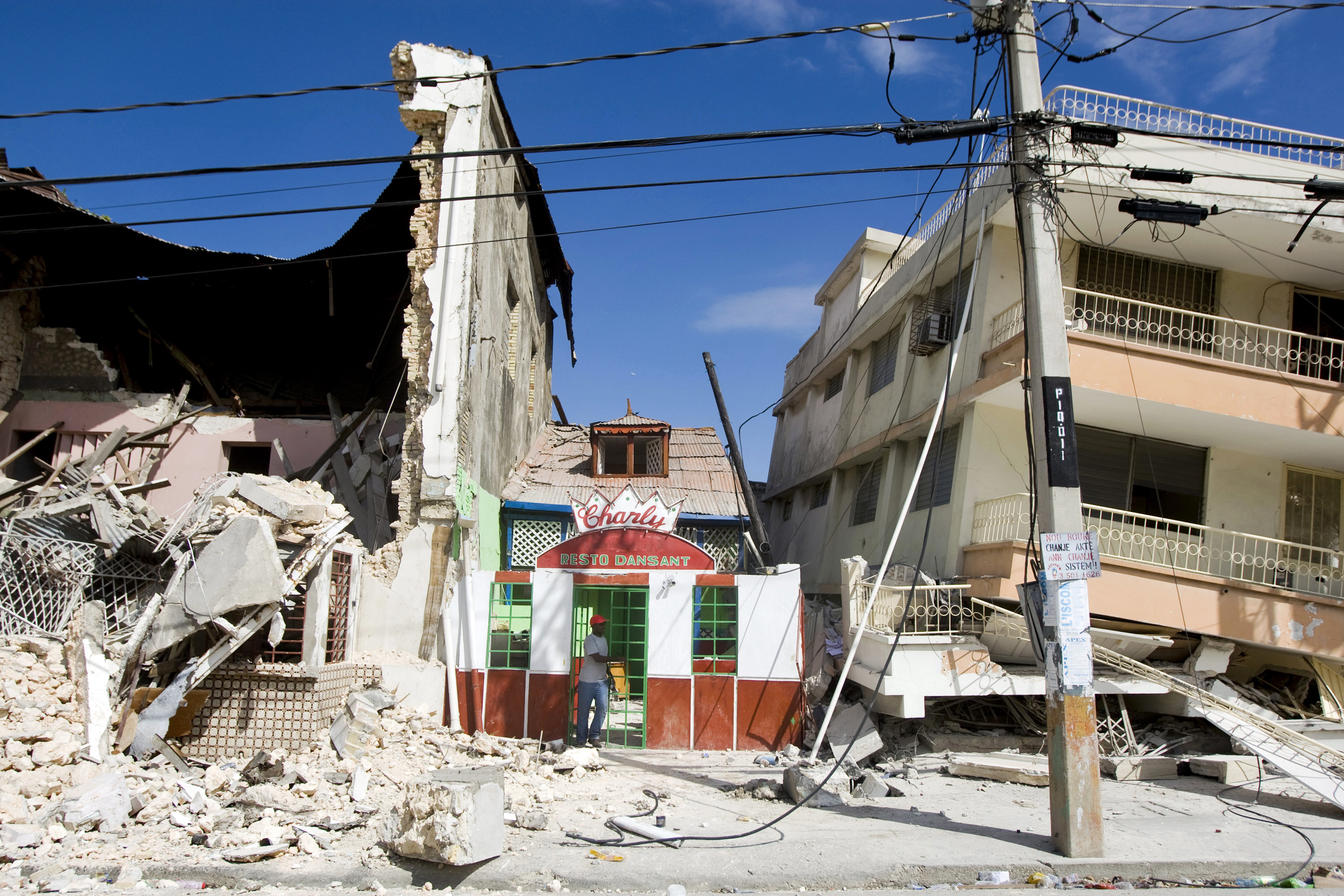
The 2010 Haiti earthquake was the most destructive compared to its magnitude, due to poorly constructed buildings and the earthquake's proximity to the capital Port-au-Prince.

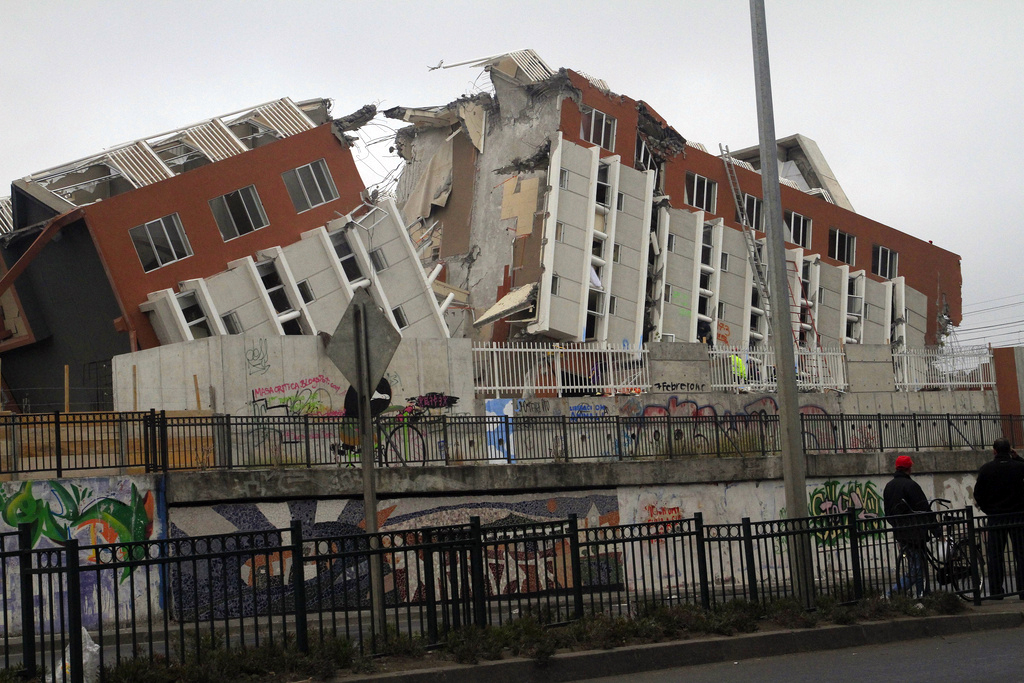
The 2010 Chile earthquake was the most significant earthquake to impact this country since the 1960 Valdivia earthquake and triggered a tsunami which devastated several coastal towns in south-central Chile.

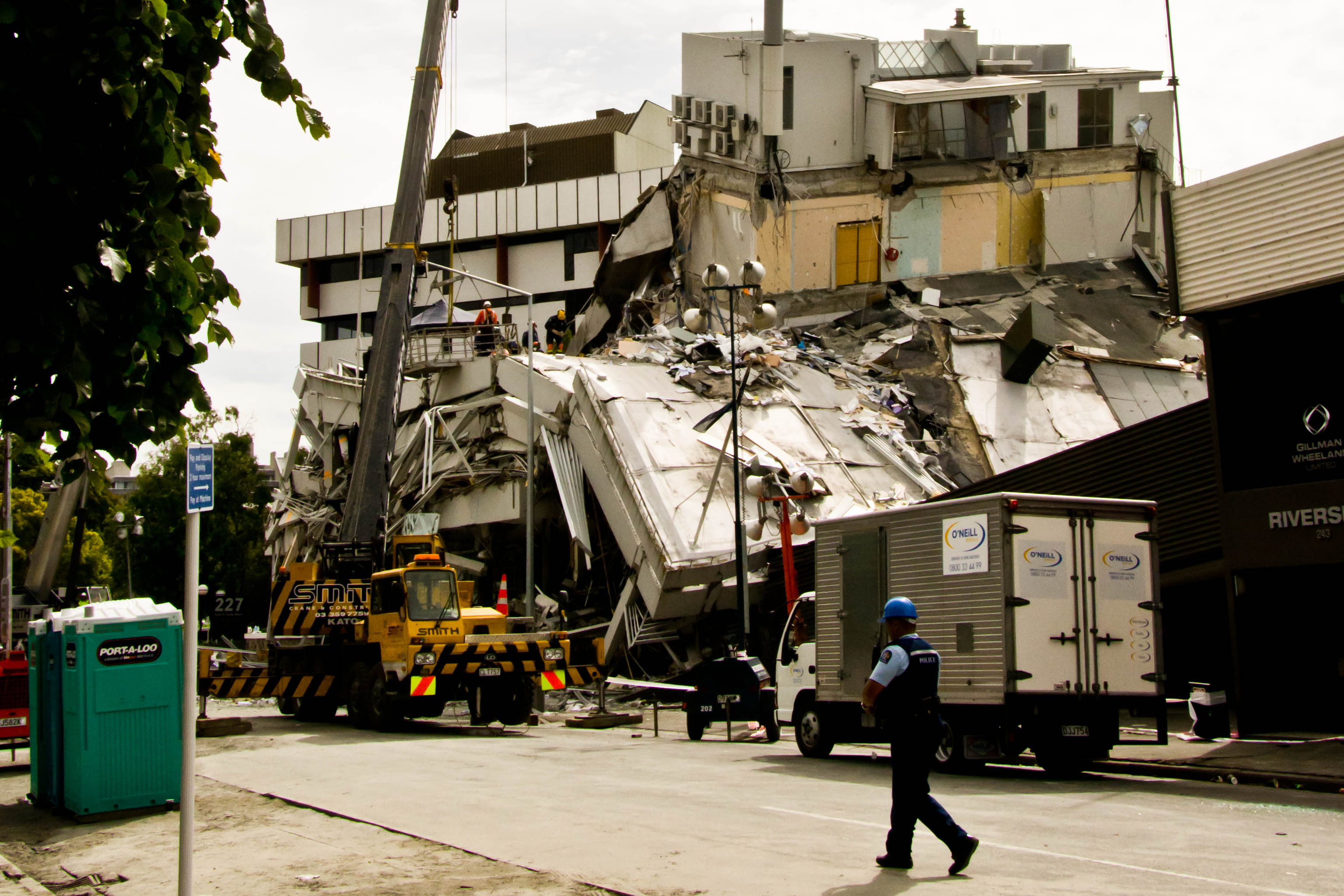
The 2011 Christchurch earthquake was a shallow event and very close to the city, resulting in extensive damage to population centers.

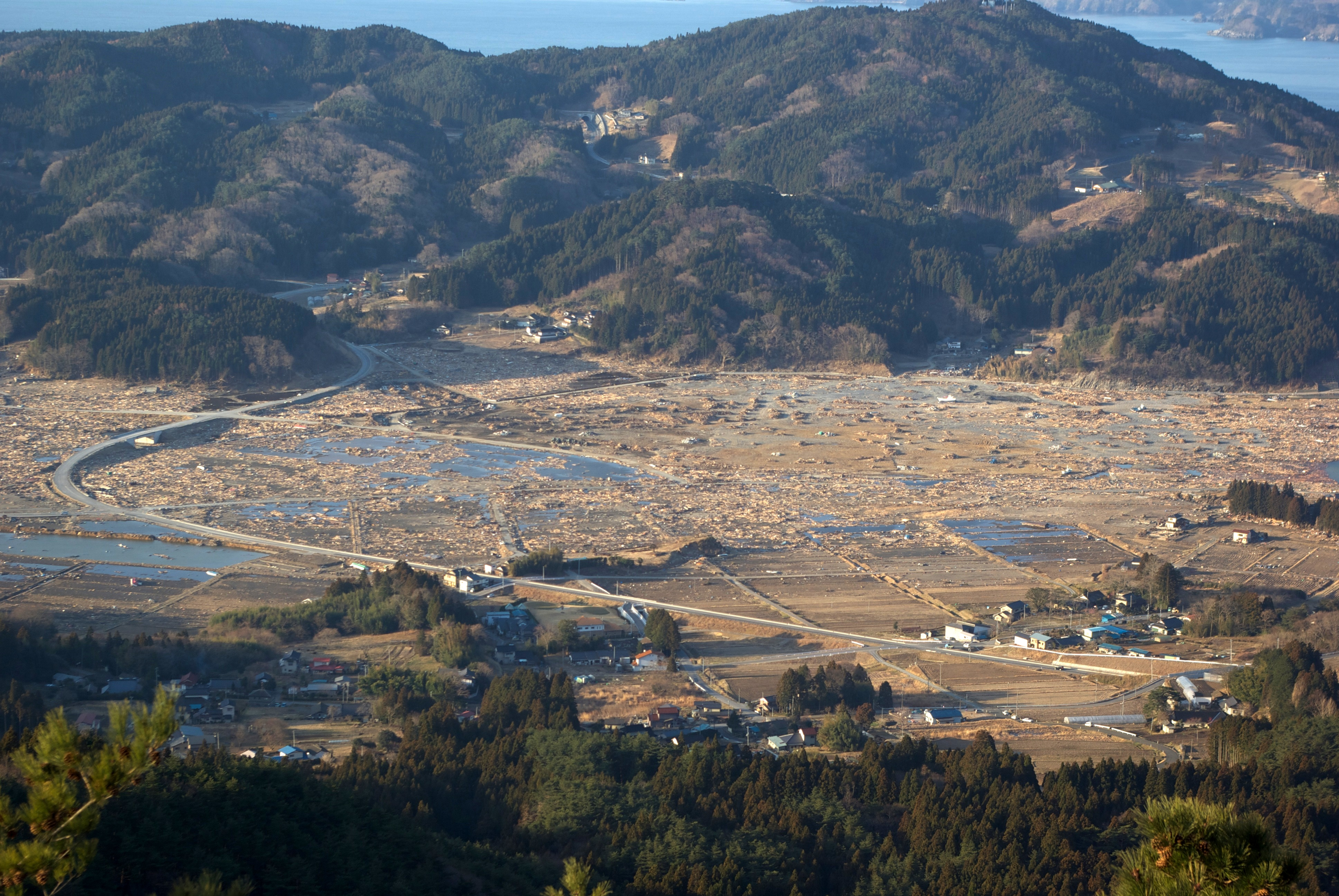
The 2011 Tōhoku earthquake and tsunami caused a nuclear meltdown at Fukushima Daiichi Nuclear Plant, resulting in the costliest natural disaster of all time.

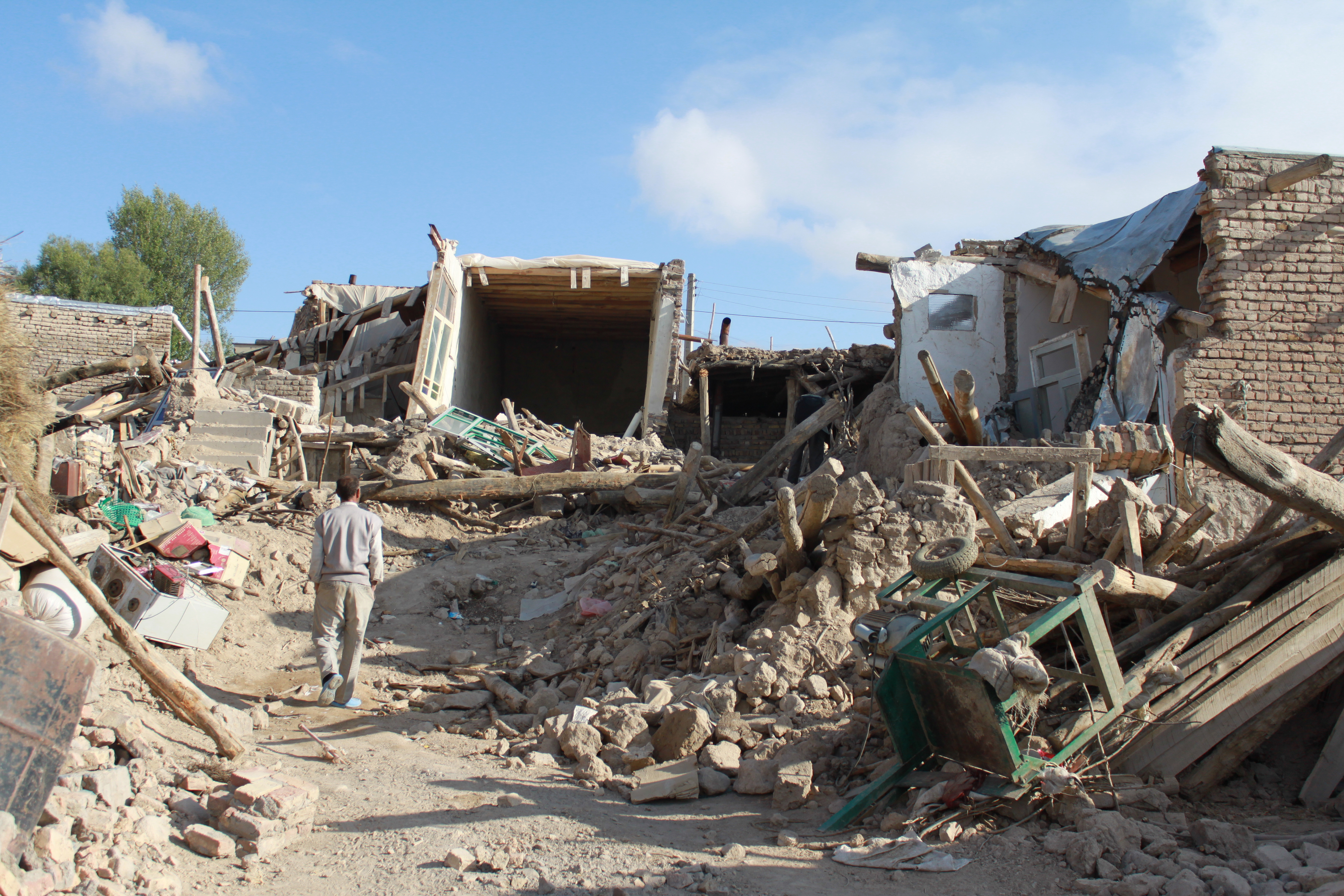
The 2012 East Azerbaijan earthquakes severely affected 150 villages and killed hundreds of people.

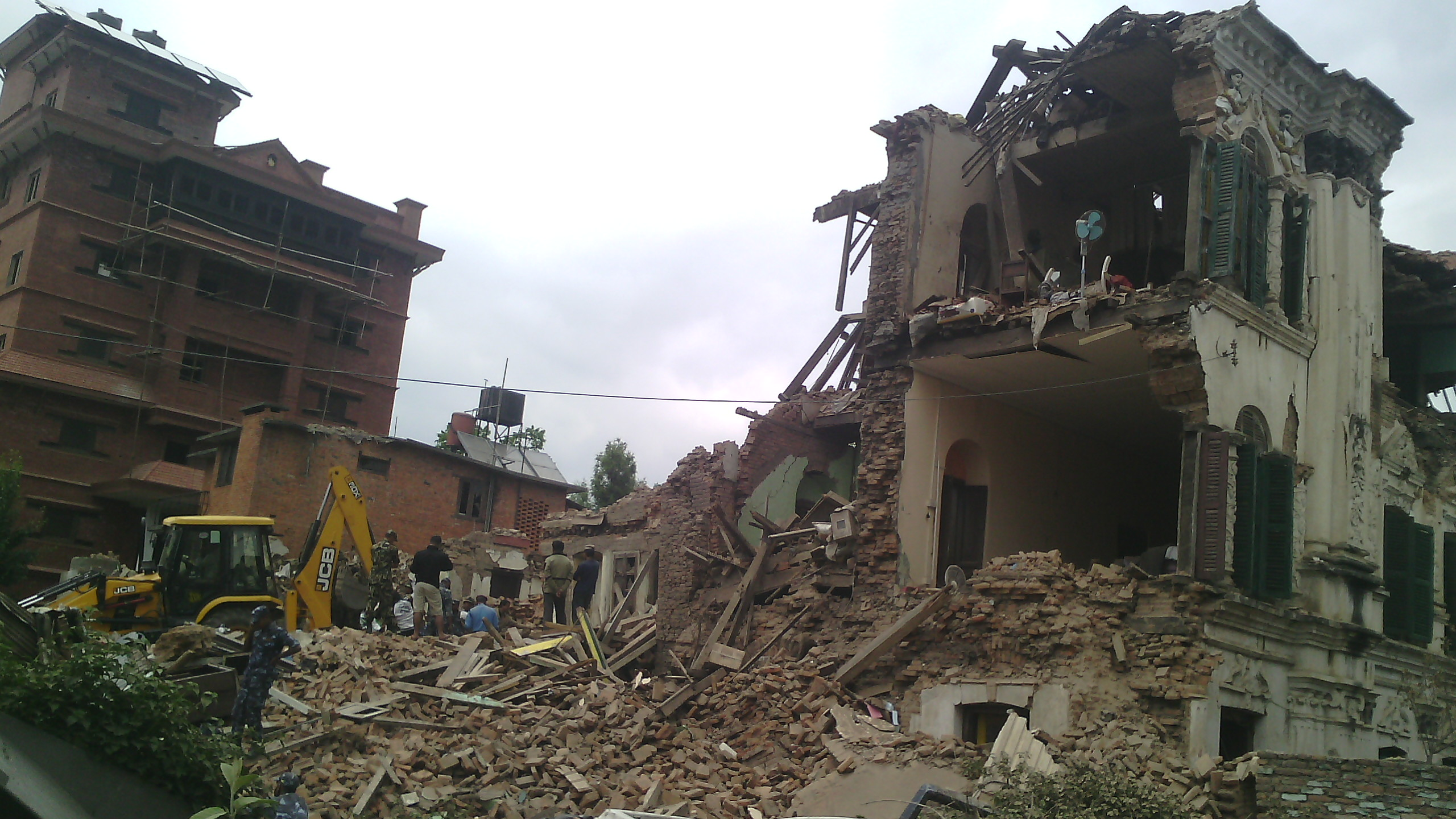
The 2015 Nepal earthquake caused extensive damage in Kathmandu and triggered the deadliest avalanche on Mount Everest.

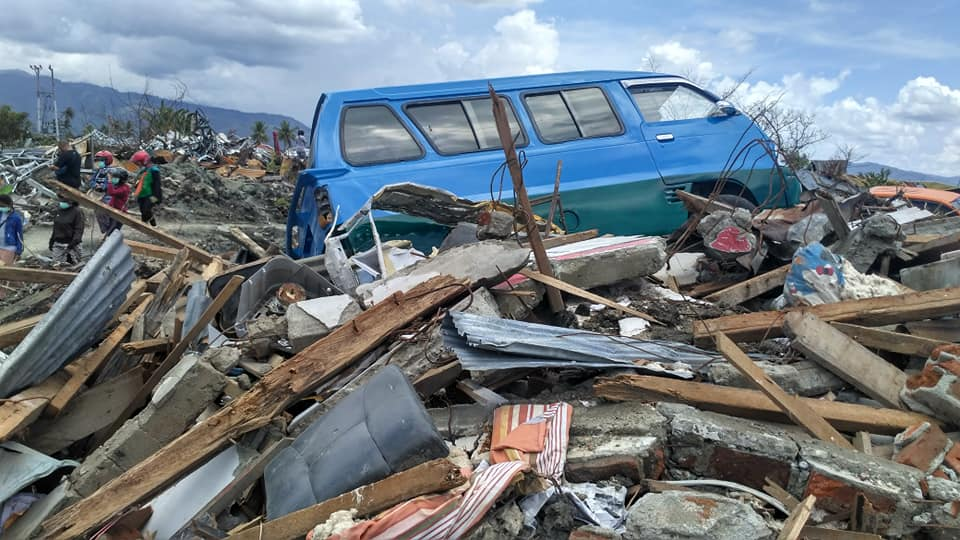
The 2018 Sulawesi earthquake caused major liquefaction in villages around the city of Palu.

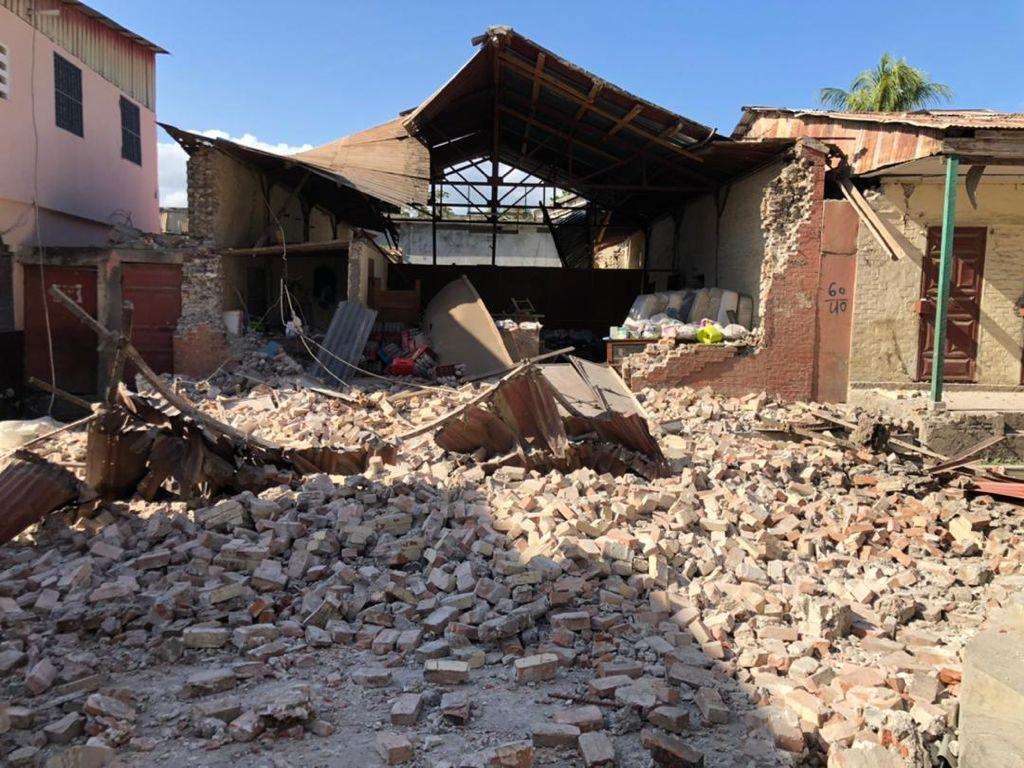
The 2021 Haiti earthquake was the country's largest earthquake in its modern history.

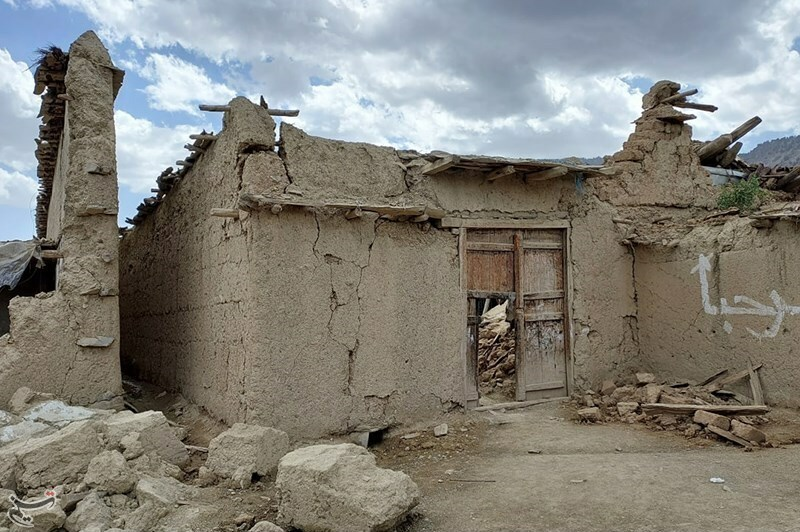
The June 2022 Afghanistan earthquake caused severe destruction and many villages were destroyed.

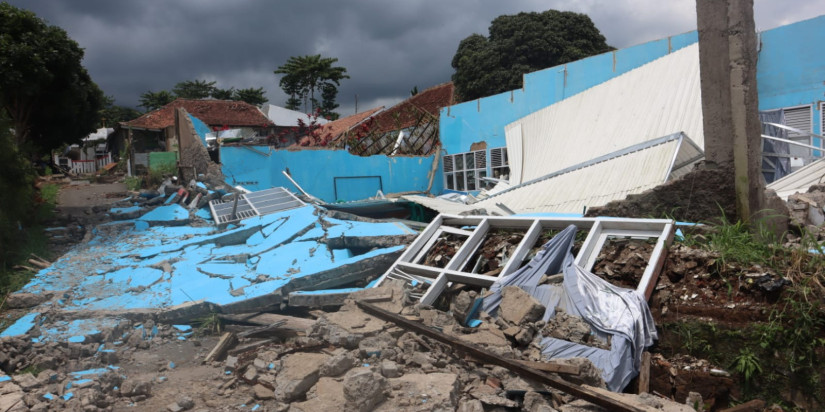
The 2022 West Java earthquake killed hundreds and destroyed tens of thousands of houses, despite its moderate magnitude.

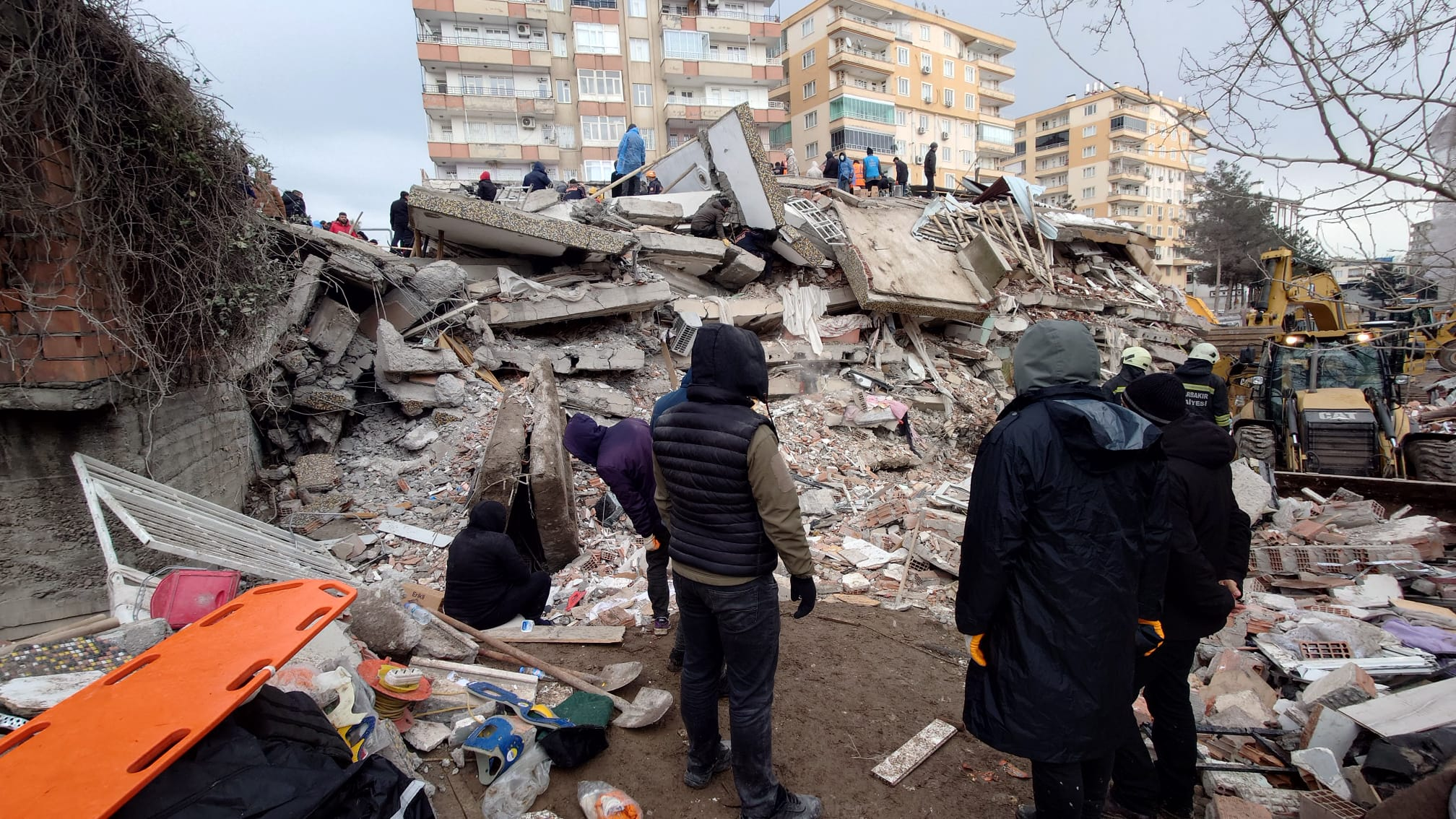
The 2023 Turkey–Syria earthquakes were among Turkey's strongest. It also killed thousands in Syria.

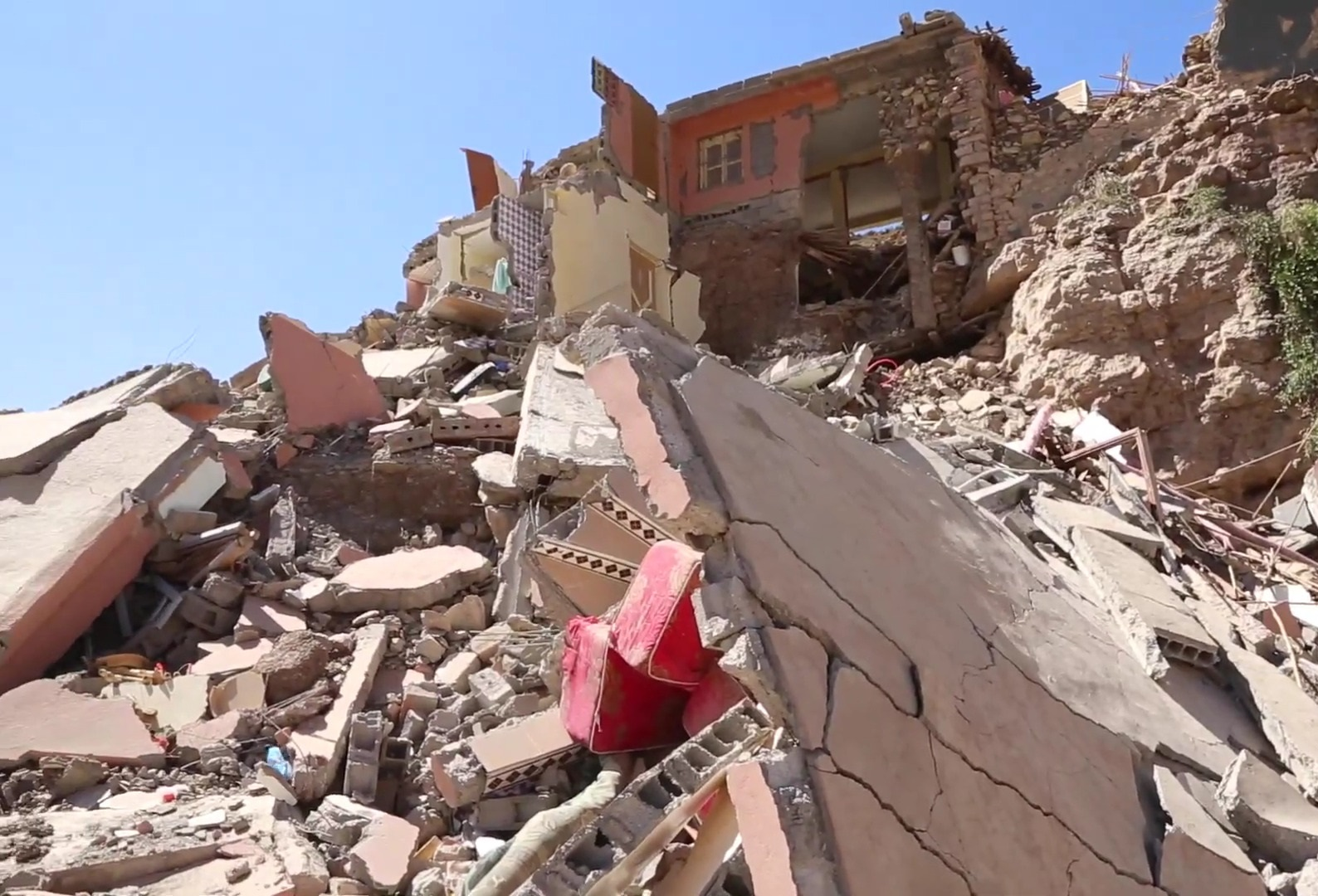
The 2023 Al Haouz earthquake was one of the deadliest and the most powerful earthquake ever recorded in modern-day Morocco.

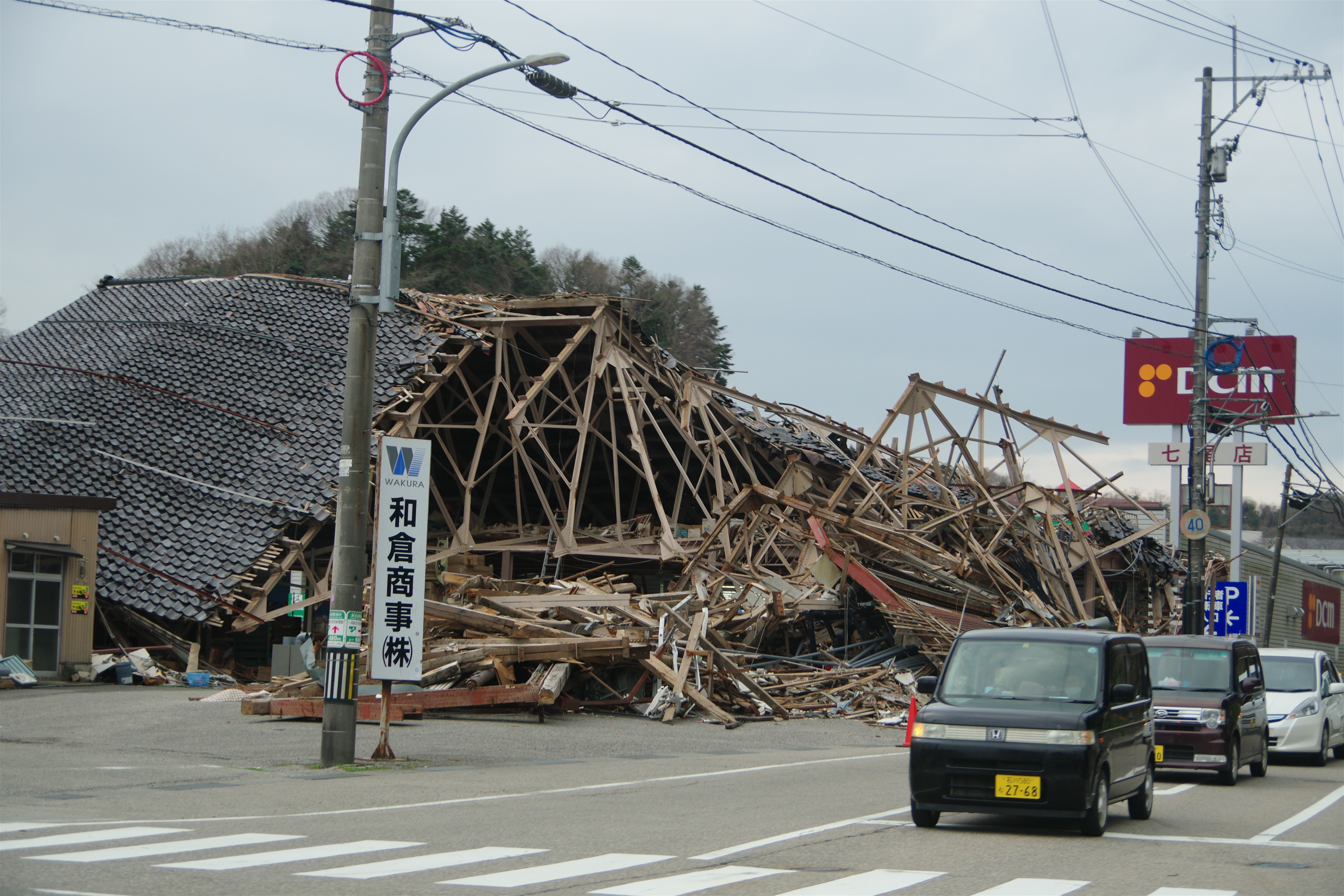
The 2024 Noto earthquake was Japan's deadliest since 2011, with the towns of Suzu and Wajima largely destroyed.

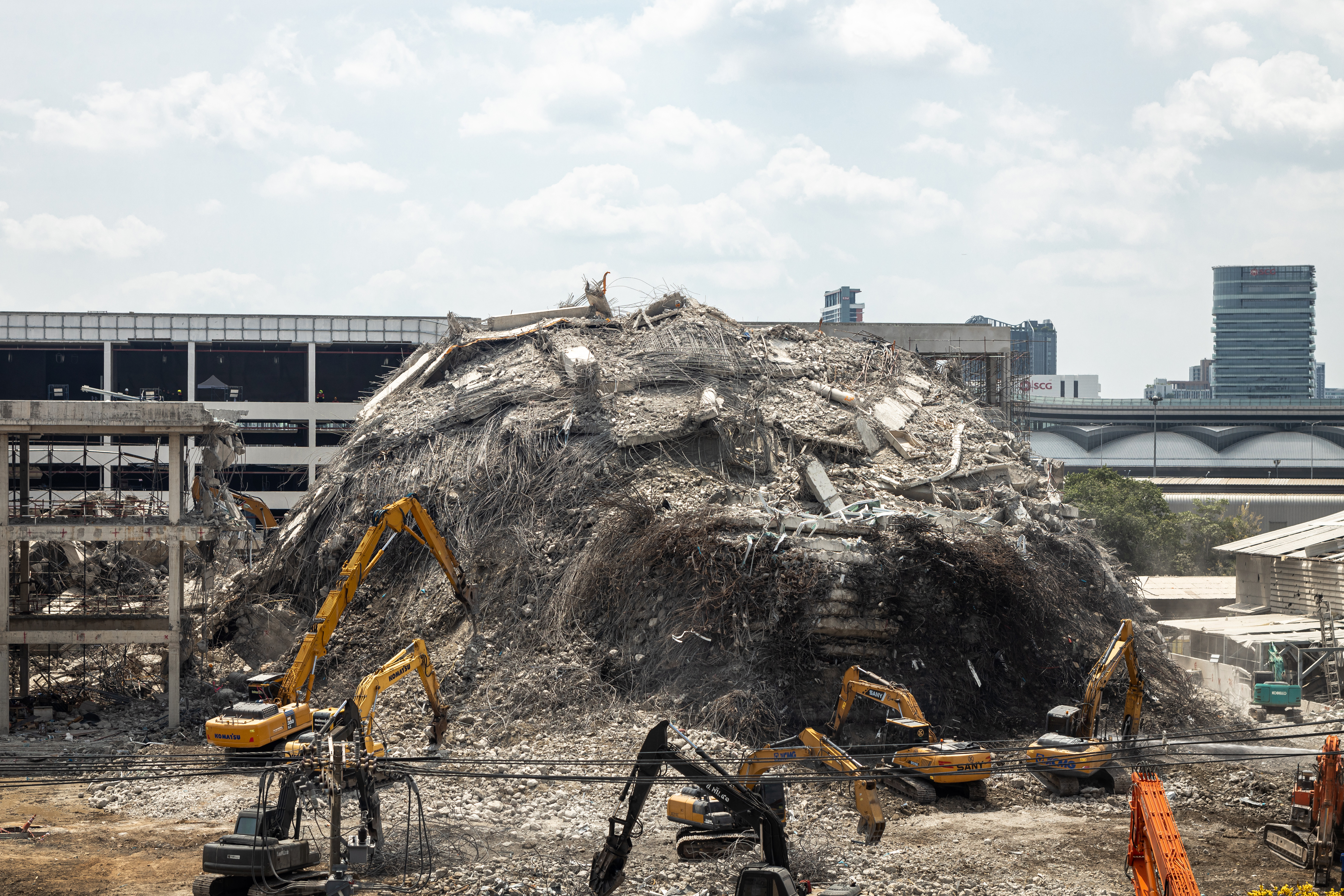
The 2025 Myanmar earthquake caused extensive destruction in the country's largest cities, and collapsed a skyscraper in Bangkok, Thailand.

== See also ==
- Lists of 20th-century earthquakes
- List of historical earthquakes
- Lists of earthquakes
