= 2015 Hindu Kush earthquake =

2015 Hindu Kush earthquake may refer to:

- December 2015 Hindu Kush earthquake
- October 2015 Hindu Kush earthquake

== See also ==
- Hindu Kush earthquake (disambiguation)
