= April 2009 Afghanistan earthquake =

2009 Afghanistan earthquake
- Location within Afghanistan
- UTC time: Doublet earthquake:
- 2009-04-16 21:27:51
- 2009-04-16 23:42:51
- ISC event: n/a
- USGS-ANSS
- ComCat
- ComCat
- Local date: April 17, 2009
- Local time
- 01:57
- 04:22
- Magnitude
- 5.2 M_{wc}
- 5.1 M_{wb}
- Depth: 5.9 km (3.7 mi); 4.0 km (2.5 mi)
- Epicenter: 34.19°N 70.08°E
- Type: Reverse
- Areas affected: Afghanistan; Pakistan
- Max. intensity: MMI VI (Strong)
- Casualties: 19 dead 51 injured

The 2009 Afghanistan earthquake was a dip-slip doublet earthquake occurred in eastern Afghanistan, with an initial shock of magnitude of 5.2 M_{w} at 01:57:51 April 17 local time, with a second shock of 5.1 M_{w} occurring several hours later. The maximum Mercalli intensity was VI (Strong).

== Damage ==
The quakes struck a remote area about 50 miles (90 km) east of Kabul near the Pakistan border. A government representative told AP News that the quakes destroyed 200 mud homes in four villages that had reportedly experienced serious damage.

== See also ==
- List of earthquakes in 2009
- List of earthquakes in Afghanistan

== Sources ==
- ANSS. "Afghanistan 2009a". Comprehensive Catalog. U.S. Geological Survey.
- ANSS. "Afghanistan 2009b". Comprehensive Catalog. U.S. Geological Survey.
- "Deadly quakes strike Afghanistan". BBC. April 17, 2009. Archived from the original on April 20, 2009.
- National Geophysical Data Center / World Data Service (NGDC/WDS) (1972), Significant Earthquake Database (Data Set), National Geophysical Data Center, NOAA, doi:10.7289/V5TD9V7K, archived from the original on September 29, 2006.
