= 2010 Afghanistan earthquake =

- Location within Afghanistan
- UTC time: 2010-04-18 20:28:50
- ISC event: 14580687
- USGS-ANSS: ComCat
- Local date: 18 April 2010
- Local time: 20:28:50 UTC
- Magnitude: 5.6 M_{wc}
- Depth: 13 km (8.1 mi)
- Epicenter: 35.71°N 67.68°E
- Areas affected: Afghanistan
- Max. intensity: MMI VII (Very strong)
- Landslides: Yes
- Casualties: 11 killed, 70+ injured

The 2010 Afghanistan earthquake occurred on April 18 with a moment magnitude of 5.6. The earthquake could be felt in Mazar-i-Sharif, Kabul, and elsewhere in Afghanistan, as well as in Uzbekistan and Tajikistan. Eleven people were killed and more than 70 were injured. More than 2,000 houses were destroyed.
