= October 2009 Afghanistan earthquake =

- Location within Afghanistan
- UTC time: 2009-10-22 19:51:27
- ISC event: 15928545
- USGS-ANSS: ComCat
- Local date: 23 October 2009
- Local time: 00:21:27
- Magnitude: 6.2 M_{w}
- Depth: 185.9 km (116 mi)
- Epicenter: 36.517°N 70.950°E
- Type: Dip-slip (reverse)
- Areas affected: Afghanistan; Pakistan
- Max. intensity: MMI V (Moderate)
- Landslides: Yes
- Casualties: 5 deaths

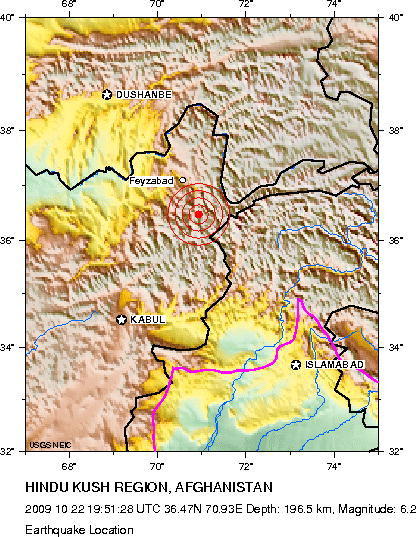
Magnitude 6.2 earthquake, Hindukush region, Afghanistan, 2009

A 6.2 magnitude earthquake occurred in Afghanistan on October 22, 2009, at 19:51:27 UTC. The maximum Mercalli intensity was V (Moderate) at Fayzabad, Badakhshan.

== Tectonic setting ==
The ongoing continental collision between the Indian plate and Eurasian plate results in tectonic uplift, forming the Himalaya, Hindu Kush and Pamir Mountains. The two plates collide along a convergent plate boundary which includes the Main Himalayan Thrust. Broad crustal deformation caused by the Indian plate ploughing into Eurasia causes uplift within the interior of Asia. This action created the Tibetan Plateau. Shallow earthquakes occur on faults that accommodate the tectonic stresses caused by the collision. Some of the largest earthquakes have exceeded magnitude 8.0, while even moderately large 6.0 events have resulted in thousands of fatalities. Most of these earthquakes are associated with reverse, thrust or strike-slip faulting. Large earthquakes with magnitudes of up to 7.5 have occurred in the region with an average recurrence interval of 15 years. These earthquakes correspond to reverse faulting at a depth of 170 to 280 km. These earthquakes rather than occurring at a plate boundary, are sourced from within the Indian plate as it dives beneath the Hindu Kush. As the tectonic slab of the Indian plate descends at a near-vertical angle into the mantle, it stretches and begins to "tear", eventually leading to a slab detachment. This action results in stress accommodation along faults that produces earthquakes when ruptured.

== Earthquake ==
This was a relatively deep shock with a reverse focal mechanism. The quake was widely felt in both Pakistan and Afghanistan, it was felt in areas such as Karachi, Kabul and Islamabad.

== Casualties ==
Landslides killed three people and two others suffered fatal heart attacks in Mirpur, Pakistan.

== See also ==
- List of earthquakes in 2009
- List of earthquakes in Afghanistan
