= 2023 Herat earthquakes =

Earthquakes in western Afghanistan

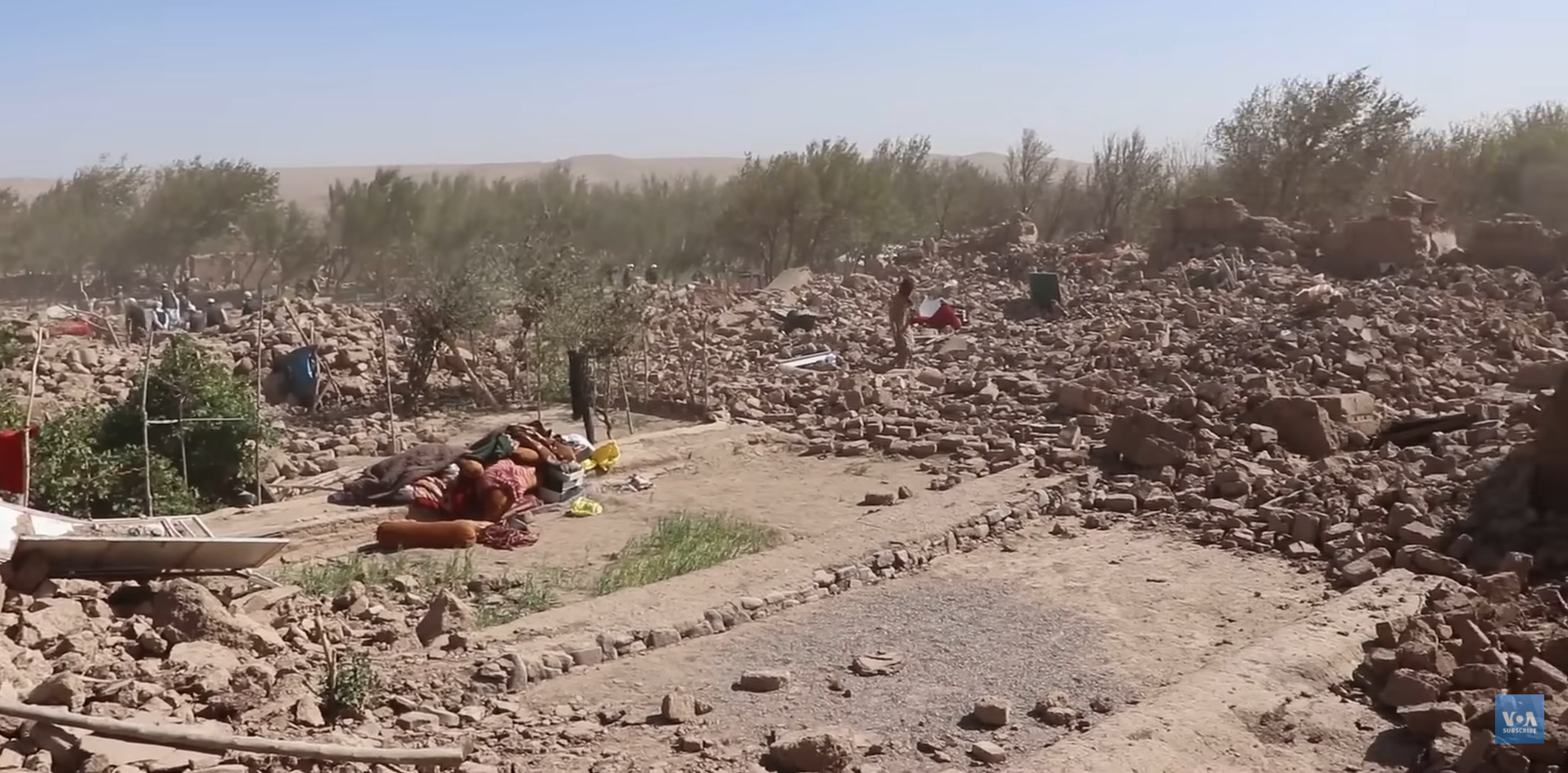
- A village destroyed by the earthquakes

- Location within Afghanistan
- UTC time: 2023-10-07 06:41:03
- 2023-10-07 07:12:50
- 2023-10-11 00:41:56
- 2023-10-15 03:36:00
- ISC event: 635743372
- 635743376
- 635746074
- 635804203
- USGS-ANSS: ComCat
- ComCat
- ComCat
- ComCat
- Local date: 7 October 2023
- 7 October 2023
- 11 October 2023
- 15 October 2023
- Local time: 11:11 AFT (UTC+4:30)
- 11:42 AFT (UTC+4:30)
- 05:11 AFT (UTC+4:30)
- 08:06 AFT (UTC+4:30)
- Magnitude: 6.3 M_{w}
- 6.3 M_{w}
- 6.3 M_{w}
- 6.3 M_{w}
- Depth: 14.0 km (8.7 mi)
- 8.0 km (5.0 mi)
- 8.0 km (5.0 mi)
- 9.0 km (5.6 mi)
- Epicenter: 34.610°N 61.924°E
- Type: Thrust
- Areas affected: Afghanistan; Iran
- Max. intensity: MMI VIII (Severe)
- Casualties: 1,489 dead, 2,444–2,744 injured: 1,482 dead, 2,100–2,400 injured (October 7 events); 3 dead, 169 injured (October 11 event); 4 dead, 162 injured (October 15 event); 13 injured (October 28 event)

Four large earthquakes measuring M_{ww} 6.3 each and their aftershocks affected Herat Province in western Afghanistan in early October 2023. The first two earthquakes occurred on 7 October at 11:11 AFT and 11:42 AFT near the city of Herat, followed by many aftershocks. On 11 and 15 October, two other magnitude 6.3 earthquakes struck the same area. These earthquakes were associated with thrust faulting. The World Health Organization estimated 1,482 fatalities, 2,100 injuries, 43,400 people affected and 114,000 people requiring humanitarian aid due to the mainshock. The 11, 15 and 28 October earthquakes caused a combined seven deaths and 344 injuries.

The earthquakes struck Afghanistan during an ongoing humanitarian crisis following the Taliban takeover in 2021, and existing aid groups were experiencing a lack of funds prior to the disaster. Some aid agencies including UNICEF and the Red Cross appealed for donations in response to the earthquakes. Many international organizations and countries participated in rescue and relief efforts. Hospitals were overwhelmed by the number of injured and lack of proper equipment. Thousands more were made homeless as the country entered the winter.

== Tectonic setting ==
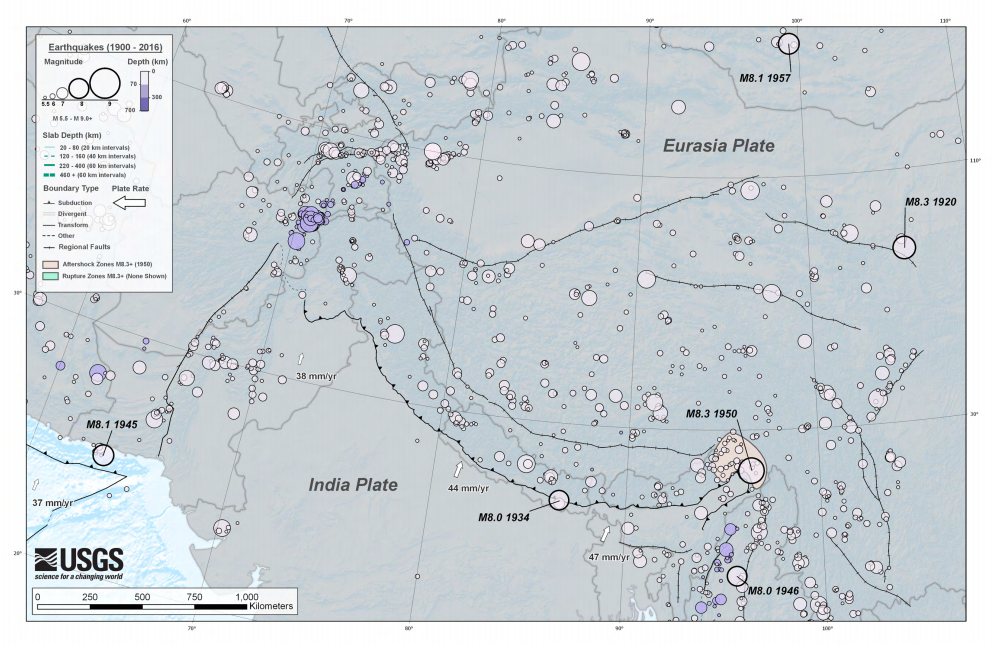
Tectonic plate boundary map of the South Asian region

Afghanistan is situated within the broad and complex zone of collision between the Arabian Plate, the Indian Plate, and the Eurasian Plate. The western part of the country is subdivided into the North Afghan Platform to the north and a series of accreted terranes to the south. The North Afghan Platform has remained relatively tectonically stable since the Variscan Orogeny during the Late Palaeozoic, when it became part of Eurasia. To the south there is a collage of continental fragments and magmatic arcs that have been progressively accreted, particularly in the Mesozoic era. The boundary between these two crustal areas is the major right-lateral strike-slip Harirud (or Herat) Fault, which is far less seismically active than the Chaman Fault that runs through the east of the country. To the north of the Harirud Fault, the near parallel Band-e Turkestan Fault does show signs of recent activity, also in a right-lateral sense.

The seismicity of Afghanistan is attributed to the complex and active tectonic interactions between the Arabian, Eurasian, and Indian plates. Within 250 km (160 mi) of the 7 October earthquakes epicenters, there have been seven magnitude 6.0 or greater earthquakes with epicenters in Iran. These include a M_{w} 7.3 earthquake in May 1997 and a M_{w} 7.1 earthquake in 1979. In June 2022, eastern Afghanistan was affected by an earthquake that killed over 1,000 people.

== Earthquakes ==
The first event, measuring a magnitude of 6.3, struck at 11:11 AFT (06:41 UTC). A magnitude 5.5 aftershock occurred eight minutes later. Another magnitude 6.3 event struck at 11:42 AFT (07:12 UTC), followed by a magnitude 5.9 aftershock. On 11 October, a third M_{ww} 6.3 earthquake occurred within the same area and another event of the same magnitude occurring on 15 October. The United States Geological Survey said all four earthquakes were the result of shallow thrust faulting. The fault plane solution indicate a rupture source striking east–west with a north or south dip. On 28 October, a M_{ww}5.0 event hit the area, followed by a mb4.8 aftershock the next day.

According to seismologists, these earthquakes had epicenters between the Siakhubulak Fault in the north and Herat Fault in the south. According to satellite data from Sentinel-1A, an area measuring 30 km (19 mi) by 15 km (9.3 mi) and extending east–west around the location of these earthquakes was uplifted. Meanwhile, the satellite detected subsidence in a small area east of the uplifted zone. The seismologists added that the ground deformation was diffuse and inferred the earthquakes were associated with a blind thrust fault. The fault responsible is likely a structure located between the Herat and Siakhubulak faults.

Italy's National Institute of Geophysics and Volcanology released two possible finite fault models for the second large earthquake. In both models, no slip occurred at the top depth of the model. The first model is a north-dipping, east-southeast–west-northwest striking thrust fault. The rupture mechanism was reverse-faulting with a small right-lateral component, initiating at a depth of 5.0 km (3.1 mi). In this model, the maximum slip was 2.2 m (7 ft 3 in) at 4.8 km (3.0 mi) depth and immediately east of the hypocenter. Slip of 1 m (3 ft 3 in) or greater was observed east and west of the hypocenter although the largest slip (>2 m (6 ft 7 in)) was observed to the east.

In the latter model, the fault dips to the south and strikes east–west. The focal depth is inferred to be 5.8 km (3.6 mi); the zone of maximum slip is located east of the hypocenter, where it peaked at 2.8 m (9 ft 2 in). Overall, to the immediate east and west of the hypocenter, the slip was about 2 m (6 ft 7 in) although the larger values were observed further away.

== Impact ==
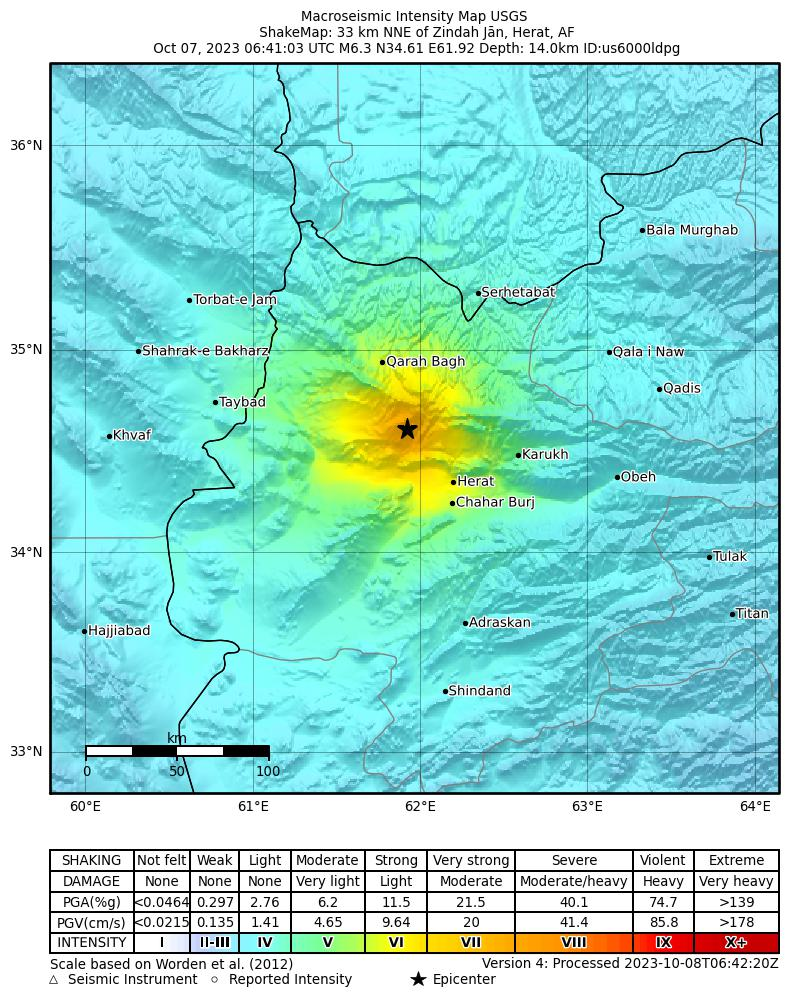
Strong ground motion map of the October 7 earthquake

=== 7 October earthquakes ===
The World Health Organization reported 1,482 deaths as of 19 October while Taliban officials said about 1,000 had died. The Taliban revised the death toll on 11 October from a previous estimate of over 3,000. They added that confusion arose as rescue groups had counted twice and there were coordination issues. The World Health Organization said 90 percent of the casualties were women and children who died in their homes when they collapsed. At the time of the earthquakes, most men were outdoors, the organization added. The World Health Organization recorded 2,100 wounded while the Taliban provided an estimate of 2,400 people injured.

The United Nations also estimated 43,300 people affected and 114,000 people in need of aid. Among the villages affected were Mahal Wadakah, where 20 people died, Dasht Hows, Bahadorzai, and Zoryan. Telephone communications were also lost. In addition to the destruction in Herat Province, collapsed houses and injuries were also reported in the neighbouring provinces of Badghis and Farah.

Over 21,500 houses were destroyed, and 17,088 others were severely damaged. At least 21,300 buildings, including 21 health facilities and 21 schools also received damage. Homes constructed of mud constituted the hardest-hit settlements; a resident of one of the affected areas said many homes collapsed during the first earthquake. An official representing the National Disaster Management Authority said in several villages with populations of 1,000, only 100 out of an estimated 300 houses remained intact.

Over 15 villages were destroyed, three others were severely damaged and 38 were moderately affected. The village of Nayeb Rafi was completely razed and nearly 80 percent of its population perished. In Siah Aab, Zinda Jan District, 300 inhabitants perished. In the Kushk District, more than 200 houses were damaged or destroyed to some extent. Entire families, including some with 30 members, were reportedly trapped under the rubble. In the village of Sarboland, dozens of houses were levelled and a resident said at least 30 people died. Up to 170 people were reported to have died in the village of Kashkak. Hundreds of people remained trapped beneath collapsed ruins, said a government official on 8 October.

Medieval-era minarets in Herat also sustained damage. Plaster from walls fell while parts of buildings collapsed in the city. In Iran's Razavi Khorasan province, one person in Torbat-e Jam was injured and minor damage to houses occurred in Taybad.

=== 11, 15 and 28 October earthquakes ===
The 11 October earthquake killed three people and injured at least 169. Of the injured, 153 were in Herat, 13 were from Badghis, and three were from Farah provinces. Many people were living outdoors because of damage to homes from the first two quakes when the third earthquake struck in the early morning. The governor's office in Herat said several neighbouring districts that were badly affected by previous earthquakes had experienced "huge losses" following the 11 October shock. This earthquake destroyed all 700 houses in Chahak, a village undamaged by the previous earthquakes. The Herat–Torghundi highway was blocked by a landslide. In Herat, damage was limited; bricks from the Akhtaruddin Castle collapsed and parts of its walls fractured. Several minarets also collapsed. Parts of rooftop of the Great Mosque of Herat fell and scattered debris into the floor; the Herat Citadel was also damaged.

The earthquake on 15 October caused four deaths, 160 injuries and additional damage in the eastern districts of Herat city. Several villages were completely destroyed and power outages occurred in most of Herat Province. Two people were also injured in Torbat-e Jam, Iran. The 28 October earthquake injured 13 people and caused additional property damage in Herat.

== Search and rescue ==
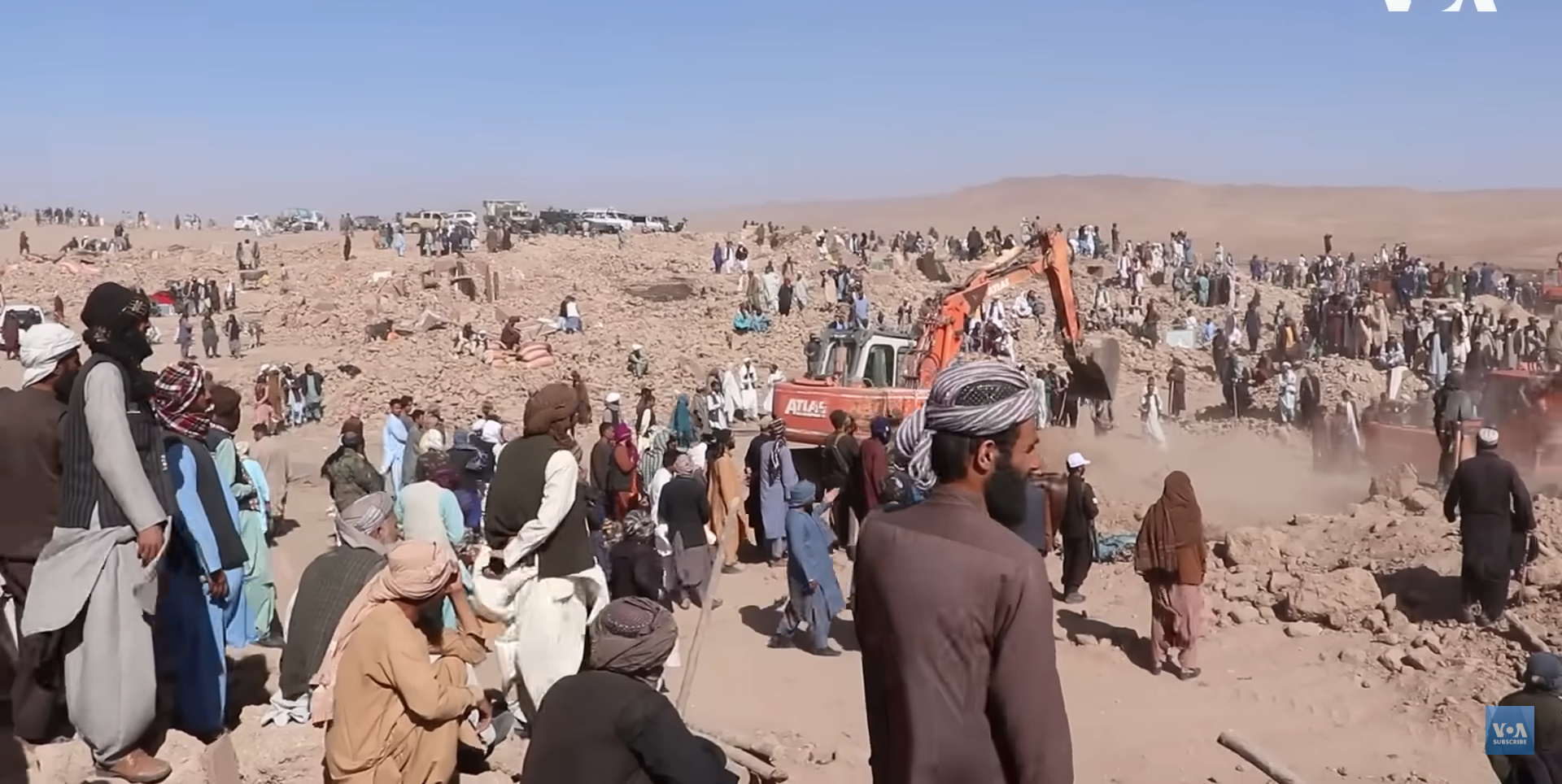
Rescue efforts in a devastated village, Herat Province

The earthquakes occurred at a time when the region was struggling to cope with multiple crises such as displacement caused by decades of war, a years-long drought, and a huge reduction in foreign aid since the Taliban takeover in 2021.

The World Health Organization dispatched 12 ambulances to Zinda Jan District to transport casualties to hospitals. The United Nations dispatched four ambulances carrying doctors and psychosocial support counsellors to a hospital. The Associated Press reported on 9 October that three mobile health teams were expected to be in Zinda Jan District. Five medical tents designed to assist 80 patients were established by Doctors Without Borders at Herat Regional Hospital. Seven teams of the Afghan Red Crescent Society were involved in rescue efforts while more teams were expected to arrive from eight other provinces. A spokesman for the organization said people made homeless were residing at a temporary shelter. The organization also provided tarpaulins, water storage containers, kitchen appliances, blankets and many other essentials. UNICEF distributed 10,000 hygiene kits, 5,000 family kits, 1,500 sets of winter clothes and blankets, 1,000 tarpaulins, and basic household items to the area.

The national director of World Vision Afghanistan said on 9 October that "the situation is worse than we imagined", adding that people were still attempting to rescue those trapped under debris with their hands. Communication outage and blocked roads hampered rescue missions. In affected villages, residents used shovels and their bare hands to retrieve survivors beneath the rubble. An Afghan police spokesperson said on 8 October that the affected people required food and shelter. Personnel from the military and nonprofit organizations such as the Red Crescent also participated in rescue missions. The World Food Program said their workers were distributing food packages. Food packages were ready for 20,000 people; each package sufficient to sustain a family of seven for a month. The organization was also preparing to provide food support for up to 70,000 people. Athlete Rashid Khan pledged his Cricket World Cup fees to help victims of the earthquake and announced that a fundraising campaign would be set up.

A provincial health department official said over 200 bodies were transported to hospitals and many of the dead were women and children. The main hospital of Herat prepared for the large inflow of victims by lining-up beds outside. At Herat Hospital, a health worker said vans carrying bodies were arriving every minute. Many health workers at the hospital were overwhelmed at the number of injured and the morgue had been overrun. The Taliban governor's office in Kandahar said 10 teams including 37 doctors and nurses were sent to Herat Province. Kandahar's public health director said the teams were also transporting 2 tons of medicine.

By 10 October, approximately 72 hours after the first two earthquakes, rescue efforts had subsided; however, rescue and relief teams were active again following the third earthquake on 11 October. Health teams transferred several of the wounded to a hospital. According to the Afghan Red Crescent on 12 October, search and rescue efforts were 98 percent completed. However, in the affected area, 32 health and rescue groups would remain in the area. There were no announcements from the Taliban about officially ending all rescue efforts. Following the 15 October earthquake, three damage assessment teams were dispatched by Iran to Razavi and South Khorasan provinces. Iran also sent a damage assessment team to Torbat-e Jam.

== Aftermath and recovery ==
Mass funerals were held in the affected villages. Three hundred people were given a mass funeral and burial in Siah Ab. More than 35 rescue teams from military and nonprofit organizations had been deployed. On 13 October, the Supreme Court of Afghanistan ordered the release of 473 prisoners from a prison facility in Herat Province due to fears that it may collapse after cracks were found in its walls during a two-day damage inspection. All prisoners were released by the same day on compassionate grounds and because they had served most of their sentence.

About 2,100 displaced people fled to Herat. People with relatives or homes in other provinces evacuated Herat after the 15 October earthquake. Due to aftershocks, many survivors did not sleep in their homes. The World Health Organization said these aftershocks had left survivors "in a persistent state of anxiety and fear". Many homes, offices and mosques were abandoned as residents were living in temporary tents. Many traumatized and anxious people visited hospitals for assistance. The director-general of the World Health Organization, Tedros Adhanom Ghebreyesus, said Herat Province became a "tent city" as people took refuge under tents in parks and open spaces. In January 2024, Fran Equiza, the UNICEF representative in Afghanistan, said that almost 100,000 children in the affected areas remained in urgent need of humanitarian aid.

Many hospitals in Herat became overwhelmed by patients. At the Herat Regional Hospital, there were support teams from Médecins Sans Frontières. Although most patients did not have life-threatening injuries, many remained at the hospital because their homes were uninhabitable. Afghanistan was also entering the winter season while thousands of people remained homeless amidst cold temperatures. Doctors Without Borders stated that more than 340 people were discharged from a hospital but refused to leave as they had no homes. By 12 October, the World Health Organization had treated over 5,600 individuals; many were from Zendeh Jan District. Strong winds occurred across the country beginning on 12 October, damaging tents and injuring additional people.

Abdul Ghani Baradar, Afghanistan's deputy prime minister of economic affairs, visited the affected area and met locals, officials and health workers. During the visit, he also announced the Taliban would construct new houses for survivors. The Taliban announced they plan to provide housing for survivors before the winter.

By January 2024, at least 3,000 houses had been constructed in Zinda Jan, while the reconstruction efforts saw the usage of superadobe housing in Afghanistan for the first time. However, Luo Dapeng, the representative of the World Health Organization in Afghanistan, estimated that between 200,000 and 300,000 people were still living in tents following the earthquake. Nearly 300 schools were damaged by the earthquake, affecting 180,000 students.

== International reactions ==
The Taliban publicly appealed for aid; at a news conference on 8 October, they said all international and internal organizations support was needed. Besides many countries offering aid, many international organizations also contributed to the humanitarian response. The International Federation of Red Cross and Red Crescent Societies said requested immediate assistance and said on 12 October, only 36 percent of its US$132.64 million appeal was collected. A separate fundraising for US$20 million was also organized by UNICEF. Nevertheless, the international response to the earthquake was seen as slow due to many countries' reluctance to interact with the Taliban-led government and the start of the Gaza war, which began hours before the first mainshock happened on 7 October. In February 2024, the UN estimated that around $400 million was needed for reconstruction and recovery efforts from the disaster.

- Australia: Australia pledged AU $1 million in aid to the Afghanistan Humanitarian Fund.
- Canada: Foreign affairs minister Mélanie Joly said that her thoughts were with Afghans, adding "Canada stands ready to support the Afghan people." International development minister Ahmed Hussen also indicated that the country was closely monitoring the situation.
- China: Chinese ambassador to Afghanistan Zhao Xing announced that his government and its charitable institutions were ready to give all forms of assistance. The Chinese Red Cross Society offered $200,000 in aid.
- European Union: The European Union approved a €3.5 million aid package.
- Germany: Germany pledged €60 million for humanitarian aid.
- Indonesia: The National Agency for Disaster Countermeasure sent Rp 22,104 billion in aid and 17 types of items to the earthquake victims.
- Iran: Foreign Minister Hossein Amir-Abdollahian promised humanitarian aid to Afghanistan in a phone call with Afghan acting Foreign Minister Amir Khan Muttaqi. Rescue teams from Iran arrived with advanced and complete equipment to speed up the delivery of aid. Ten teams including 50 rescue workers and 500 tents, 1,000 pieces of moquette, 4,000 blankets, 500 dishes, and 500 food packages, along with search equipment were sent.
- Japan: The Ministry of Foreign Affairs issued a statement saying it was providing US$ 3 million to international organizations. Japanese non-governmental organizations would also receive US$ 1.46 million to provide food, health and other necessities.
- Kazakhstan: President Kassym-Jomart Tokayev announced the delivery of humanitarian assistance including food, tents, medicines, clothing and other necessary items, as well as the deployment of rescue personnel and dogs to Afghanistan. A total of 1,659 tons of humanitarian aid was sent. LLP "SK Pharmacy" allocated medicines for shipment. Forty-five employees of the Ministry of Emergency Situations were sent to Herat province to carry out search and rescue operations. They managed to work through 76 affected areas within the first 24 hours of deployment.
- Kyrgyzstan: Kyrgyzstan sent humanitarian aid.
- Pakistan: The National Disaster Management Authority made preparations to supply essential relief items. Pakistan sent a medical team, field hospital, 50 tents, medicines and 500 blankets to the earthquake-hit region on the "specific request" of the Afghan government. Senior officials also discussed the situation with Pakistan's ambassador to Afghanistan, Ubaid Ur Rehman Nizamani, and other department personnel. However, due to a tweet from Pakistani prime minister Anwar ul Haq Kakar regarding the Taliban regime having sought assistance from Islamabad, the Taliban rejected Pakistan's offer.
- Qatar: Qatar sent humanitarian aid.
- Saudi Arabia: Saudi Arabia sent humanitarian aid.
- Singapore: The Singapore Red Cross pledged US$50,000 to support the humanitarian effort.
- South Korea: South Korea provided US$1 million.
- Tajikistan: Tajikistan provided US$1.5 million.
- Turkey: The Ministry of Foreign Affairs extended its condolences to the people of Afghanistan and expressed sympathy for the recovery of the injured. The Ministry of National Defense announced that an aircraft containing emergency relief materials and equipment of AFAD had departed from Murted Air Base for Afghanistan.
- Turkmenistan: Medical equipment, clothes, and food were donated to a charity organization.
- United Arab Emirates: The Ministry of Foreign Affairs said 22 aircraft delivered food packages, 500 tents and 140 aid packages.
- United States: Secretary of State Antony Blinken announced that the United States was "carefully following the impact of the earthquake", adding that its humanitarian partners were "responding with urgent aid in support of the people of Afghanistan." USAID announced $12 million in urgent humanitarian assistance.
- Uzbekistan: Uzbekistan sent 100 tons of humanitarian aid.

== See also ==
- List of earthquakes in 2023
- List of earthquakes in Afghanistan
- Lists of 21st-century earthquakes
