= List of earthquakes in 2023 =

Earthquakes in 2023
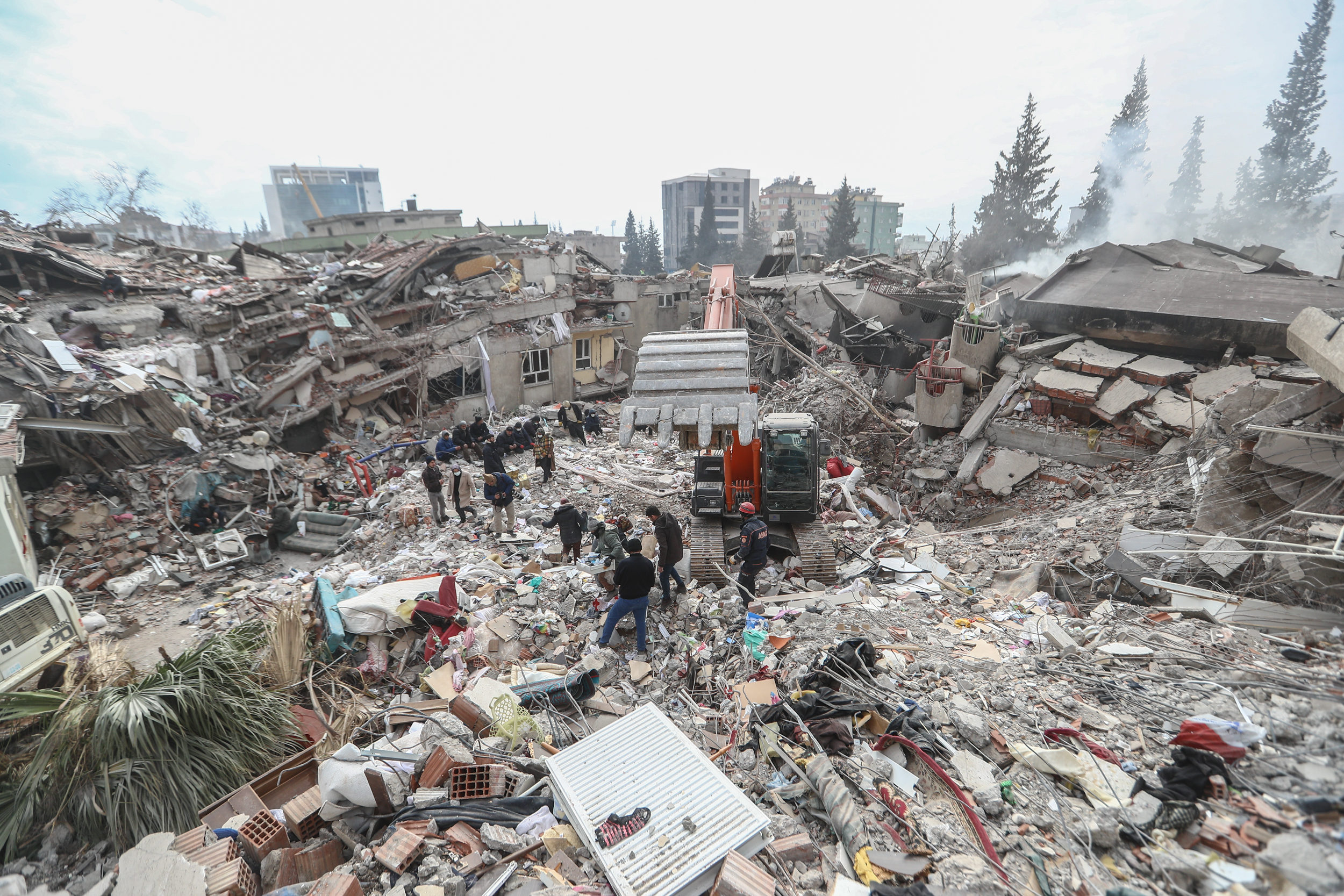
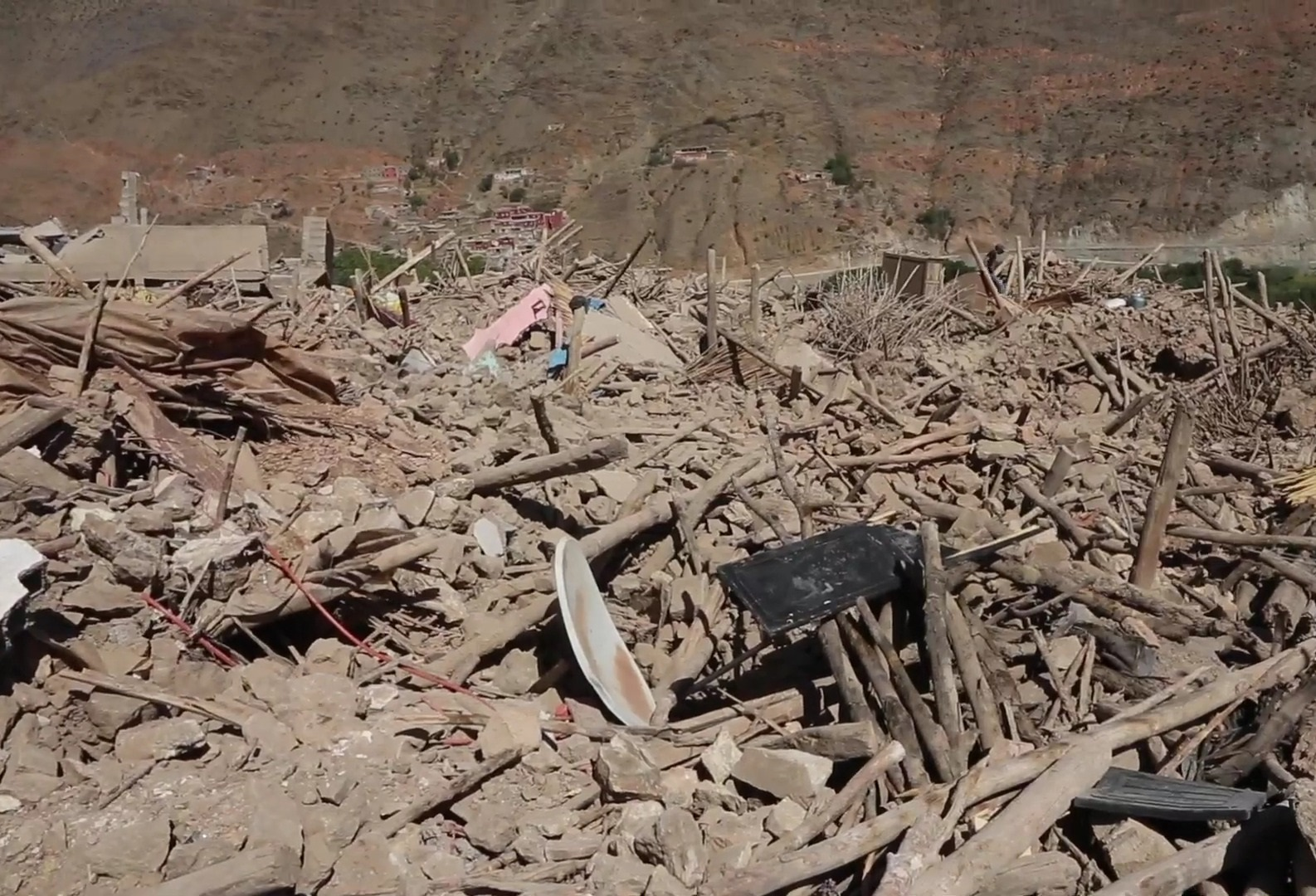
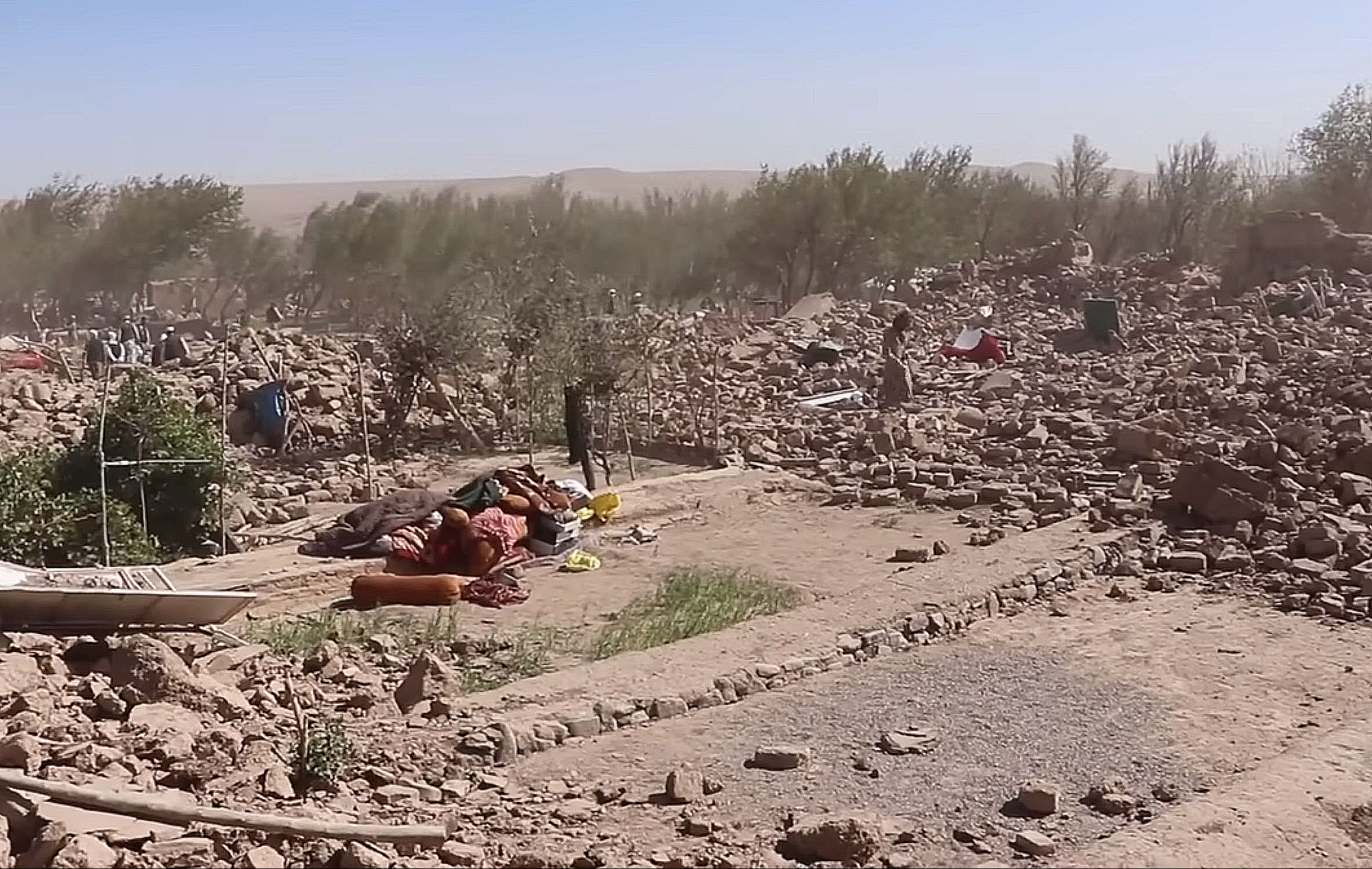
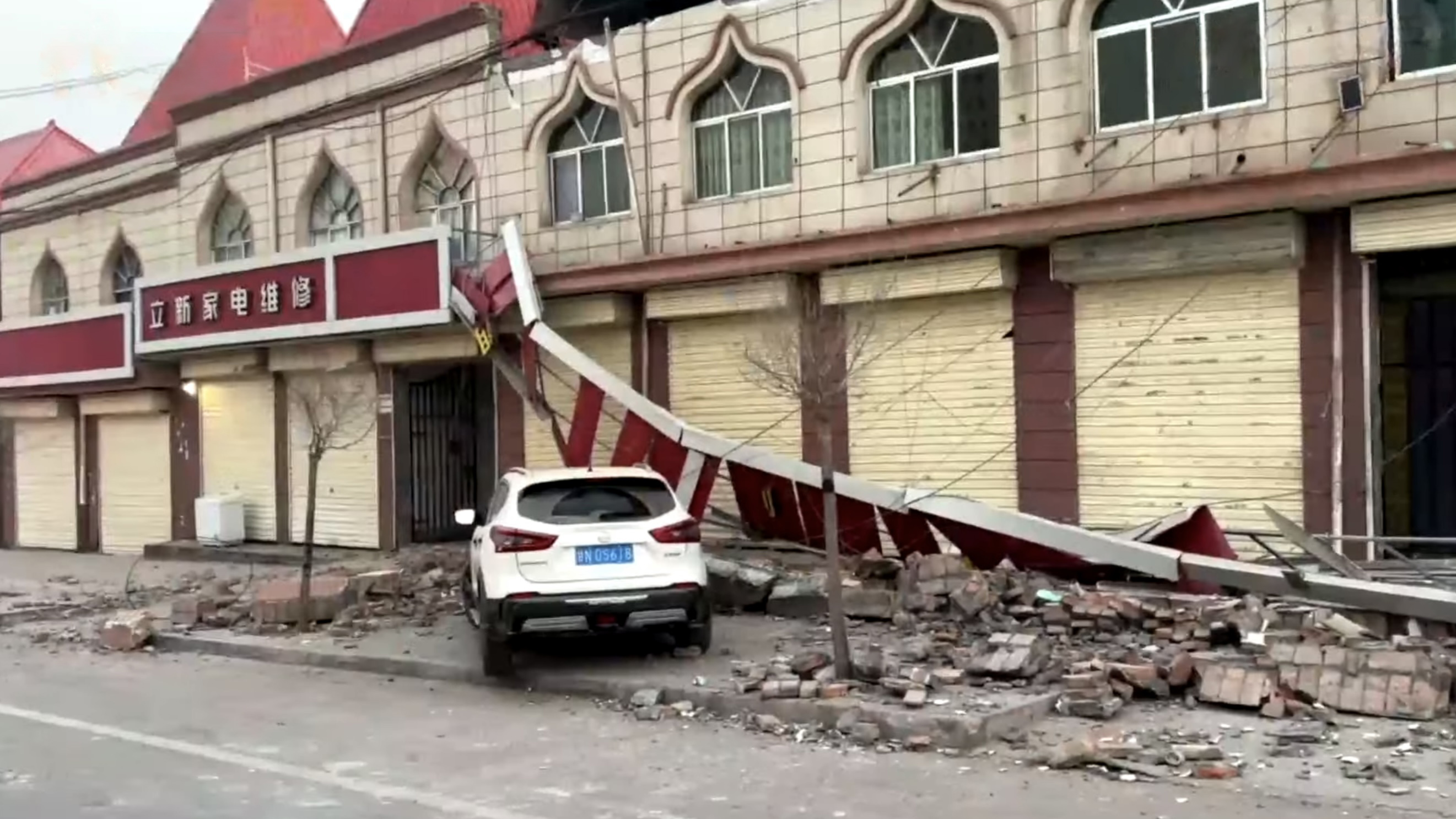
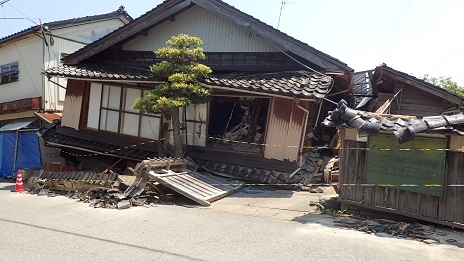
- From top, left to right: Collapsed buildings after the 2023 Turkey–Syria earthquakes • Imi N'Tala, Morocco after the 2023 Al Haouz earthquake • A village destroyed by the 2023 Herat earthquakes • Damage to a building after the 2023 Jishishan earthquake • A house destroyed by the 2023 Noto earthquake

Approximate epicenters of notable earthquakes in 2023
- 4.0–5.9 magnitude
- 6.0–6.9 magnitude
- 7.0–7.9 magnitude
- 8.0+ magnitude
- Strongest: 7.8 M_{w} Turkey
- Deadliest: 7.8 M_{w} Turkey; 59,488–62,013 deaths
- Total fatalities: 64,351–66,876

Number by magnitude
- 9.0+: 0
- 8.0–8.9: 0
- 7.0–7.9: 19
- 6.0–6.9: 128
- 5.0–5.9: 1,637
- 4.0–4.9: 13,816

This is a list of earthquakes in 2023. Only earthquakes of magnitude 6 or above are included, unless they result in a significant impact due to major damage, deaths or serious injuries. All dates are listed according to UTC time. The maximum intensities are based on the Modified Mercalli intensity scale. Earthquake magnitudes are based on data from the USGS. Nineteen earthquakes ≥M7 occurred within the year, with no ≥M8 earthquakes recorded for the second consecutive year.

Up to 66,900 people died from earthquakes in 2023, the highest death toll for earthquakes since 2010. At least 59,488 people died in the Turkey–Syria doublets of February, which dominated world headlines because of their extensive devastation; the first mainshock was also the largest earthquake of the year at M_{w}7.8. In September, Morocco suffered its largest earthquake in centuries; the M_{w}6.8 shock killed nearly 3,000 people. In October, four M_{w}6.3 earthquakes struck Afghanistan's Herat Province, killing over 1,400 people. A moderate shock in western Nepal also killed 153 people in November, while in December, another tremor in northern China killed 151; the nation's deadliest since 2014. Other deadly earthquakes occurred in Ecuador, Pakistan and the Philippines.

== Compared to other years ==
Number of earthquakes worldwide for 2013–2023 []
Magnitude	2013	2014	2015	2016	2017	2018	2019	2020	2021	2022	2023
8.0–9.9	2	1	1	0	1	1	1	0	3	0	0
7.0–7.9	17	11	18	16	6	16	9	9	16	11	19
6.0–6.9	123	143	127	131	104	117	135	112	138	116	128
5.0–5.9	1,469	1,594	1,425	1,561	1,456	1,688	1,500	1,329	2,070	1,599	1,633
4.0–4.9	11,877	15,817	13,776	13,700	11,541	12,785	11,899	12,513	15,069	14,022	14,450
Total	13,491	17,573	15,351	15,411	13,113	14,614	13,555	13,967	17,297	15,749	16,231

Map of earthquakes in 2023 - M 5.0 or greater (map data)

== By death toll ==
Rank	Death toll	Magnitude	Location	MMI	Depth (km)	Date	Event
1	59,488–62,013	7.8	Turkey, Kahramanmaraş	XII (Extreme)	10.0	February 6	2023 Turkey–Syria earthquakes
1	59,488–62,013	7.5	Turkey, Kahramanmaraş	XI (Extreme)	7.4	February 6	2023 Turkey–Syria earthquakes
2	2,960	6.8	Morocco, Al Haouz	IX (Violent)	19.0	September 8	2023 Al Haouz earthquake
3	1,482	6.3	Afghanistan, Herat	VIII (Severe)	14.0	October 7	2023 Herat earthquakes
4	153	5.7	Nepal, Karnali	VIII (Severe)	16.5	November 3	2023 Nepal earthquake
5	151	5.9	China, Gansu	IX (Violent)	10.0	December 18	2023 Jishishan earthquake
6	21	6.5	Afghanistan, Badakhshan	V (Moderate)	187.6	March 21	2023 Badakhshan earthquake
7	18	6.8	Ecuador, Guayas offshore	VII (Very strong)	65.8	March 18	2023 Guayas earthquake
8	11	6.3	Turkey, Hatay	IX (Violent)	16.0	February 20	2023 Turkey–Syria earthquakes
9	11	6.7	Philippines, Soccsksargen offshore	VIII (Severe)	52.0	November 17	November 2023 Mindanao earthquake

Listed are earthquakes with at least 10 dead.

== By magnitude ==
Rank	Magnitude	Death toll	Location	MMI	Depth (km)	Date	Event
1	7.8	59,488–62,013	Turkey, Kahramanmaraş	XII (Extreme)	10.0	February 6	2023 Turkey–Syria earthquakes
2	7.7	0	New Caledonia, Loyalty Islands offshore	V (Moderate)	18.0	May 19	-
3	7.6	3	Philippines, Caraga offshore	VII (Very strong)	40.0	December 2	December 2023 Mindanao earthquake
3	7.6	0	Indonesia, Maluku offshore	VI (Strong)	105.2	January 9	-
3	7.6	0	Tonga, Niuatoputapu offshore	VI (Strong)	210.1	May 10	-
6	7.5	-	Turkey, Kahramanmaraş	XI (Extreme)	7.4	February 6	2023 Turkey–Syria earthquakes
7	7.2	0	Tonga, Tongatapu offshore	VI (Strong)	167.4	June 15	-
7	7.2	0	United States, Alaska offshore	VII (Very strong)	25.0	July 16	-
9	7.1	0	Indonesia, North Sumatra offshore	VIII (Severe)	34.0	April 24	-
9	7.1	0	New Zealand, Kermadec Islands offshore	VII (Very strong)	46.8	April 24	-
9	7.1	0	Indonesia, Banda Sea offshore	VI (Strong)	10.0	November 8	-
9	7.1	0	Vanuatu, Tafea offshore	VI (Strong)	48.4	December 7	-
9	7.1	0	New Caledonia, Loyalty Islands offshore	IV (Light)	36.0	May 20	-
9	7.1	0	Indonesia, East Java offshore	IV (Light)	513.5	August 28	-
15	7.0	0	Vanuatu, Sanma offshore	VII (Very strong)	29.0	January 8	-
15	7.0	8	Papua New Guinea, East Sepik	VII (Very strong)	70.0	April 2	2023 Papua New Guinea earthquake
15	7.0	0	Indonesia, North Maluku offshore	V (Moderate)	28.6	January 18	-
15	7.0	1	Indonesia, East Java offshore	V (Moderate)	597.0	April 14	-
15	7.0	0	New Zealand, Kermadec Islands offshore	IV (Light)	10.0	March 16	-

Listed are earthquakes with at least 7.0 magnitude.

== By month ==
=== January ===
January
- Strongest: 7.6 M_{w} Indonesia
- Deadliest: 5.4 M_{w} Nepal; 4 deaths
- Total fatalities: 8

Number by magnitude
- 9.0+: 0
- 8.0–8.9: 0
- 7.0–7.9: 3
- 6.0–6.9: 8
- 5.0–5.9: 126
- 4.0–4.9: 1,248

Date	Country and location	M_{w}	Depth (km)	MMI	Notes	Casualties	
Date	Country and location	M_{w}	Depth (km)	MMI	Notes	Dead	Injured
1	Indonesia, Papua offshore, 9 km (5.6 mi) east southeast of Jayapura	5.5	30.8	V	The wall of a hospital and a hotel partially collapsed and a shopping mall damaged in Jayapura. One hotel damaged in Abepura.	-	-
1	United States, California, 15 km (9.3 mi) southeast of Rio Dell	5.4	30.6	VII	Aftershock of the 2022 Ferndale earthquake. Some houses damaged or destroyed and power outages in Humboldt County.	-	-
3	New Zealand, Waikato, 20 km (12 mi) north northwest of Matamata	5.0	10.0	VI	Over 100 homes damaged. It is the largest earthquake in the area since 1972.	-	-
4	Greece, Central Greece offshore, 13 km (8.1 mi) east of Mantoudi	4.4	9.9	VI	One house collapsed and several others damaged in Kontodespoti.	-	-
5	Afghanistan, Badakhshan, 45 km (28 mi) south of Jurm	6.0	205.3	IV	-	-	-
8	Vanuatu, Sanma offshore, 23 km (14 mi) west northwest of Port Olry	7.0	29.0	VII	Dozens of houses collapsed and some others damaged in Hog Harbour.	-	-
9	Indonesia, Maluku offshore, 339 km west southwest of Tual	7.6	105.0	VI	Eleven people injured, 15 houses collapsed, and 523 others sustained light to heavy damage in the Tanimbar Islands.	-	11
10	Turkey, Çanakkale offshore, 6 km (3.7 mi) southwest of Behram	4.9	10.0	III	At least 145 houses, four schools, and two hotels damaged in Lesbos, Greece.	-	-
12	Czech Republic, Moravian-Silesian, 2 km (1.2 mi) east northeast of Karviná	2.8	5.0	III	One person killed and eleven others injured in a mine collapse near Stonava.	1	11
15	Philippines, Eastern Visayas offshore, 10 km (6.2 mi) southeast of Bunga	4.8	10.0	V	Fifteen people injured, thirteen houses collapsed and 352 others, some churches and roads damaged.	-	15
15	Albania, Tirana, 10 km (6.2 mi) southwest of Klos	4.7	17.4	IV	At least 180 buildings damaged in Tirana.	-	-
15	Indonesia, Aceh offshore, 40 km (25 mi) southeast of Singkil	6.1	37.0	V	-	-	-
15	El Salvador, Ahuachapán, 9 km (5.6 mi) northwest of Atiquizaya	5.2	10.0	VII	Largest in a swarm of 219 tremors affecting the area in one day. Four people injured, 713 houses destroyed and 415 others damaged in El Salvador. At least 55 houses destroyed and 161 others damaged in Guatemala.	-	4
16	Japan, Bonin Islands offshore	6.3	405.0	III	-	-	-
17	Iran, Mazandaran, 14 km (8.7 mi) south of Juybar	4.5	10.0	IV	Three people injured and four buildings damaged in Sari-Juybar area.	-	3
18	Indonesia, Gorontalo offshore, 61 km (38 mi) south southeast of Gorontalo	6.0	152.5	IV	One mosque damaged in Bone Bolango Regency.	-	-
18	Indonesia, North Maluku offshore, 153 km (95 mi) northwest of Tobelo	7.0	28.6	V	Two houses collapsed in Morotai. Eighteen homes damaged and tidal flooding in North Halmahera Regency.	-	-
18	Iran, West Azerbaijan, 12 km (7.5 mi) south of Khoy	5.7	19.1	VI	Further information: 2022–23 West Azerbaijan earthquakes	-	252
20	France, Guadeloupe offshore, 40 km (25 mi) west southwest of Pointe-Noire	6.1	162.0	IV	-	-	-
20	Argentina, Santiago del Estero, 24 km (15 mi) southwest of Campo Gallo	6.8	596.8	III	-	-	-
23	Indonesia, West Java, 9 km (5.6 mi) north northeast of Sukabumi	4.5	11.1	IV	Aftershock of the 2022 West Java earthquake. Ten people injured, some previously damaged homes collapsed, and ten others damaged in Cianjur.	-	10
24	Nepal, Sudurpashchim, 62 km (39 mi) northwest of Jumla	5.4	20.3	V	One person killed by rockfalls, four others injured, 60 homes collapsed and over 400 others, several hotels, schools, hospitals and a temple damaged in Bajura and Bajhang districts, Nepal. Three people killed and 11 others injured after a building damaged by the earthquake collapsed in Lucknow, India.	4	15
24	Argentina, Santiago del Estero, 38 km (24 mi) southwest of Campo Gallo	6.4	580.0	II	Aftershock of the 6.8 earthquake four days prior.	-	-
25	China, Sichuan, 30 km (19 mi) south of Kangding	5.4	4.0	VI	Aftershock of the 2022 Luding earthquake. Some previously damaged homes destroyed, and landslides in Luding County.	-	-
26	New Zealand, Kermadec Islands offshore	6.0	135.7	IV	-	-	-
27	Indonesia, West Java, 9 km (5.6 mi) northeast of Cileunyi	4.2	11.6	-	At least 49 houses damaged, and some collapsed in Bandung Regency.	-	-
28	Iran, West Azerbaijan, 14 km (8.7 mi) southwest of Khoy	5.9	16.0	VII	Further information: 2022–23 West Azerbaijan earthquakes	3	1,750
30	Costa Rica, Puntarenas, 9 km (5.6 mi) east southeast of Jacó	4.5	36.8	IV	Five houses destroyed and three others damaged due to a landslide in Jacó.	-	-

=== February ===
February
- Strongest: 7.8 M_{w} Turkey
- Deadliest: 7.8 M_{w} Turkey; 59,488–62,013 deaths
- Total fatalities: 59,509–62,034

Number by magnitude
- 9.0+: 0
- 8.0–8.9: 0
- 7.0–7.9: 2
- 6.0–6.9: 12
- 5.0–5.9: 142
- 4.0–4.9: 1,368

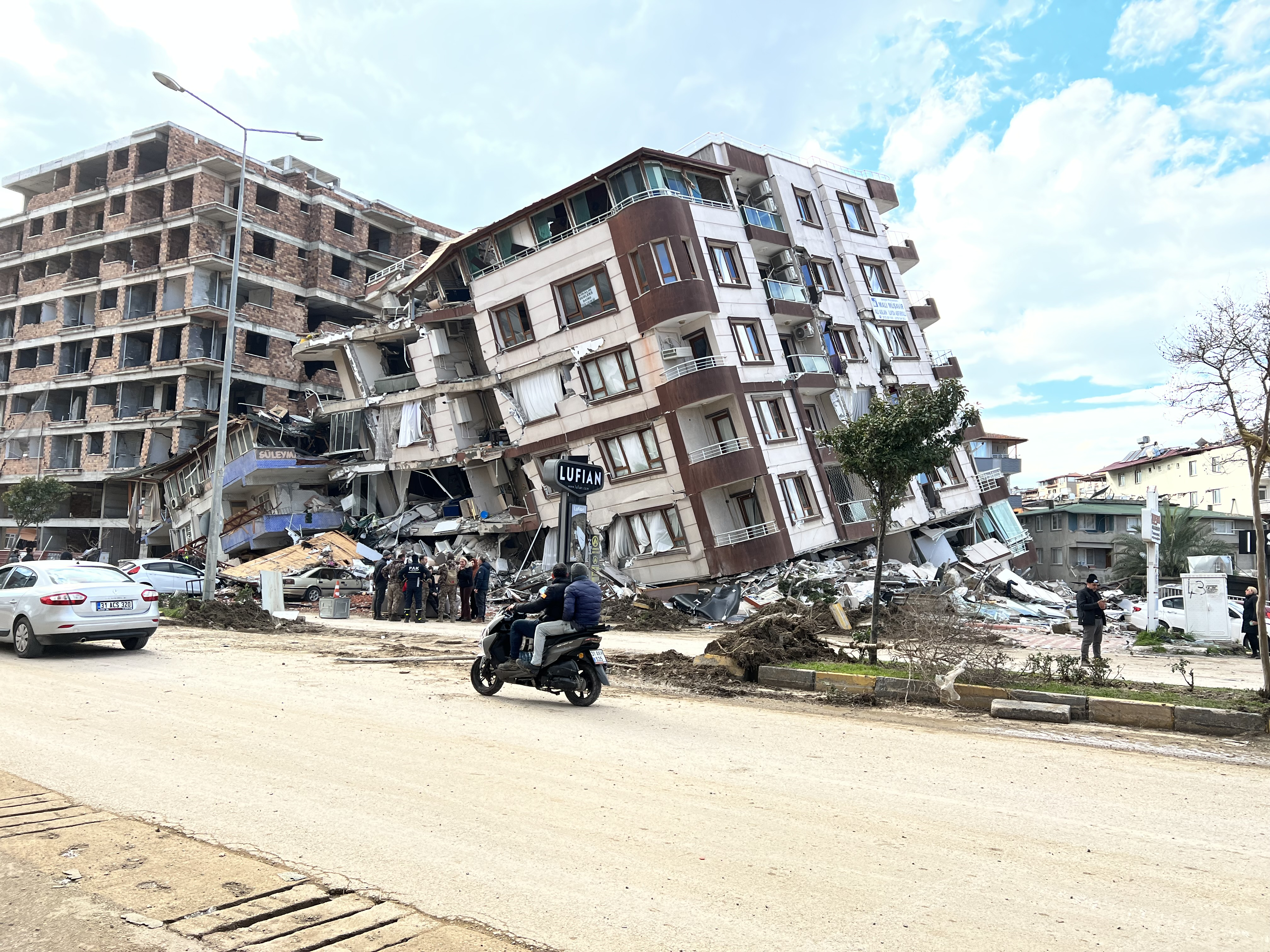
A collapsed building in Hatay, Turkey.

Date	Country and location	M_{w}	Depth (km)	MMI	Notes	Casualties	
Date	Country and location	M_{w}	Depth (km)	MMI	Notes	Dead	Injured
1	Philippines, Davao, 2 km (1.2 mi) northwest of Babag	6.0	19.0	VII	Sixteen people injured; eight houses collapsed, 543 houses, 203 buildings, including 38 schools, a supermarket and hospital damaged in Montevista, New Bataan and Nabunturan. Landslides also occurred.	-	16
1	Indonesia, West Java, 24 km (15 mi) east southeast of Banjar	4.5	10.0	III	One person injured; 495 houses and eight schools damaged in Garut Regency.	-	1
4	Iran, Kermanshah, 19 km (12 mi) southwest of Sarpol-e Zahab	4.7	10.0	V	Four people injured due to panic in Qasr-e Shirin.	-	4
6	Turkey, Kahramanmaraş, 26 km (16 mi) east of Nurdağı	7.8	10.0	XII	Further information: 2023 Turkey–Syria earthquakes	59,488–62,013	121,704
6	Turkey, Gaziantep, 18 km (11 mi) east southeast of Nurdağı	6.7	9.8	VIII	Further information: 2023 Turkey–Syria earthquakes	59,488–62,013	121,704
6	Turkey, Kahramanmaraş, 4 km (2.5 mi) south southeast of Ekinözü	7.5	7.4	XI	Further information: 2023 Turkey–Syria earthquakes	59,488–62,013	121,704
6	Turkey, Malatya, 10 km (6.2 mi) southeast of Doğanşehir	6.0	20.1	VII	Further information: 2023 Turkey–Syria earthquakes	59,488–62,013	121,704
6	Turkey, Kahramanmaraş, 5 km (3.1 mi) northeast of Göksun	6.0	8.5	VIII	Further information: 2023 Turkey–Syria earthquakes	59,488–62,013	121,704
7	Philippines, Bicol offshore, 20 km (12 mi) north northeast of Sabang Indan	4.8	10.0	IV	Twenty-one buildings and two houses damaged in Camarines Norte.	-	-
8	Peru, Huancavelica, 15 km (9.3 mi) west southwest of Vilca	3.4	10.0	-	Seventy houses and a church damaged in Huasicancha.	-	-
8	Lebanon, Baalbek-Hermel, 19 km (12 mi) east northeast of Bcharré	4.1	10.0	III	One person killed and another missing after a building collapsed in Harasta, Syria.	1	-
9	Indonesia, Papua offshore, 9 km (5.6 mi) west southwest of Abepura	5.1	22.0	V	Four people killed when a restaurant collapsed, five others were injured, 15 houses collapsed, 29 others, five office buildings, and several other buildings damaged in Jayapura.	4	5
13	New Zealand, Kermadec Islands offshore	6.1	374.0	III	-	-	-
14	Romania, Gorj, 2 km northwest of Lelești	5.6	10.0	VIII	Further information: 2023 Gorj earthquakes	-	19
15	Philippines, Bicol offshore, 10 km (6.2 mi) north northeast of Miaga	6.1	8.0	VII	One person injured, eight houses collapsed and 570 structures, including an auditorium damaged. Power outages in Masbate and Ticao.	-	1
16	Afghanistan, Badakhshan, 21 km (13 mi) north northwest of Fayzabad	4.6	56.2	II	Seventy-five houses collapsed in Fayzabad, trapping one child under the rubble.	-	-
17	Indonesia, Maluku offshore, 130 km (81 mi) southwest of Tual	6.1	39.7	V	-	-	-
20	Turkey, Hatay, 3 km (1.9 mi) south southwest of Uzunbağ	6.3	16.0	IX	Further information: 2023 Turkey–Syria earthquakes	11	1,062
22	Nepal, Sudurpashchim, 69 km (43 mi) northwest of Jumla	4.8	27.3	IV	Two houses and a school destroyed; two hospitals and eight homes damaged in Bichhiya.	-	-
23	Tajikistan, Gorno-Badakhshan, 65 km (40 mi) west southwest of Murghob	6.9	9.0	VIII	-	-	-
23	Turkey, Adana, 13 km (8.1 mi) northeast of Saimbeyli	3.5	5.0	-	One person killed due to damage at a zinc mine in Kısacıklı.	1	-
23	Indonesia, North Maluku offshore, 177 km (110 mi) north of Tobelo	6.3	97.1	V	-	-	-
25	Turkey, Niğde, 19 km (12 mi) east northeast of Emirgazi	5.2	16.5	VII	Many houses and a mosque damaged in Ereğli, some of them severely.	-	-
25	Japan, Hokkaido offshore, 27 km (17 mi) south southeast of Akkeshi	6.0	55.0	V	One person in Hamanaka injured after a fall. Cracked floors in supermarkets at Kushiro.	-	1
25	Papua New Guinea, West New Britain, 31 km (19 mi) east northeast of Kandrian	6.2	37.2	VI	-	-	-
27	Turkey, Malatya, 8 km (5.0 mi) south southeast of Yeşilyurt	5.2	10.0	VII	Aftershock of the 2023 Turkey-Syria earthquakes. About 30 buildings collapsed, two people killed, and 140 others injured.	2	140

=== March ===
March
- Strongest: 7.0 M_{w} New Zealand
- Deadliest: 6.5 M_{w} Afghanistan; 21 deaths
- Total fatalities: 42

Number by magnitude
- 9.0+: 0
- 8.0–8.9: 0
- 7.0–7.9: 1
- 6.0–6.9: 10
- 5.0–5.9: 109
- 4.0–4.9: 1,119

Date	Country and location	M_{w}	Depth (km)	MMI	Notes	Casualties	
Date	Country and location	M_{w}	Depth (km)	MMI	Notes	Dead	Injured
1	Papua New Guinea, West New Britain offshore, 106 km (66 mi) northwest of Kimbe	6.6	600.9	II	-	-	-
2	Vanuatu, Sanma offshore, 83 km (52 mi) west southwest of Port Olry	6.5	17.0	VI	-	-	-
4	New Zealand, Kermadec Islands offshore	6.9	211.0	V	-	-	-
5	Philippines, Davao, 9 km (5.6 mi) south southeast of Bantacan	5.4	10.0	VI	Foreshock of the magnitude 5.9 earthquake on 7 March. Some houses damaged in Maragusan. In Nabunturan the ceiling of a school collapsed. Severe damage to a road located between New Bataan and Maragusan.	-	-
7	Philippines, Davao, 4 km (2.5 mi) east southeast of San Mariano	5.9	16.1	VII	Sixty people were injured or fainted in panic. At least 2,198 houses destroyed and 10,081 others damaged in Davao de Oro.	-	60
9	Italy, Umbria, 2 km (1.2 mi) southwest of Umbertide	4.3	4.4	IV	Thirteen people injured and many buildings damaged in Umbertide, including 90 percent of structures in Pierantonio. Around 500 people were homeless.	-	13
9	Italy, Umbria, 2 km (1.2 mi) south of Umbertide	4.5	10.0	VII	Thirteen people injured and many buildings damaged in Umbertide, including 90 percent of structures in Pierantonio. Around 500 people were homeless.	-	13
10	Colombia, Santander, 3 km (1.9 mi) northwest of Aratoca	5.4	160.2	IV	Over 20 houses damaged in several municipalities. Two houses badly affected and had to be evacuated in San Gil.	-	-
14	Papua New Guinea, Madang offshore, 119 km (74 mi) east of Madang	6.3	213.0	IV	-	-	-
16	New Zealand, Kermadec Islands offshore	7.0	10.0	IV	A tsunami with heights of 11 cm (0.36 ft) was observed on Raoul Island.	-	-
18	Ecuador, Guayas offshore, 6 km (3.7 mi) north northwest of Balao	6.8	68.0	VII	Further information: 2023 Guayas earthquake	18	495
21	Afghanistan, Badakhshan, 40 km (25 mi) south southeast of Jurm	6.5	192.0	V	Further information: 2023 Badakhshan earthquake	21	424
22	Argentina, Jujuy, 86 km (53 mi) west southwest of El Aguilar	6.4	228.0	IV	-	-	-
22	Tajikistan, Sughd, 47 km (29 mi) north northwest of Navobod	5.8	11.6	VII	Three people injured, 72 houses destroyed, and 650 others damaged in six villages near the epicenter. Some barns collapsed, killing dozens of livestock. A school was also damaged in Leilek, Kyrgyzstan.	-	3
24	Iran, West Azerbaijan, 13 km (8.1 mi) southwest of Khoy	5.6	11.0	VIII	Aftershock of the 2022–23 West Azerbaijan earthquakes. At least 165 people injured, two houses collapsed and 78 others damaged in 10 villages in Khoy and Salmas.	-	165
27	Solomon Islands, Isabel offshore, 75 km (47 mi) west of Buala	6.2	79.0	V	-	-	-
28	Japan, Hokkaido offshore, 129 km (80 mi) east northeast of Misawa	6.1	37.0	IV	-	-	-
29	Indonesia, West Java, 16 km (9.9 mi) northeast of Sukabumi	4.0	10.8	IV	One house collapsed and several others damaged in Cianjur, two of them due to landslides in Cugenang District.	-	-
30	Chile, Maule offshore, 105 km (65 mi) west southwest of Constitución	6.3	26.0	V	-	-	-
31	Pakistan, Balochistan, 29 km (18 mi) northwest of Kot Malik Barkhudhar	3.4	10.0	V	Three children killed and five injured. Two houses collapsed and several others damaged in Chaman.	3	5

=== April ===
April
- Strongest: 7.1 M_{w} Indonesia; 7.1 M_{w} New Zealand
- Deadliest: 7.0 M_{w} Papua New Guinea; 8 deaths
- Total fatalities: 9

Number by magnitude
- 9.0+: 0
- 8.0–8.9: 0
- 7.0–7.9: 4
- 6.0–6.9: 10
- 5.0–5.9: 116
- 4.0–4.9: 1,044

Date	Country and location	M_{w}	Depth (km)	MMI	Notes	Casualties	
Date	Country and location	M_{w}	Depth (km)	MMI	Notes	Dead	Injured
2	Papua New Guinea, East Sepik, 39 km (24 mi) east southeast of Ambunti	7.0	70.0	VII	Further information: 2023 Papua New Guinea earthquake	8	"many"
3	Russia, Kamchatka Krai, 17 km (11 mi) south southeast of Vilyuchinsk	6.5	101.1	VI	Slight damage in Petropavlovsk-Kamchatsky. The Mutnovskaya Power Station was temporarily shut down, causing power outages.	-	-
3	Indonesia, North Sumatra offshore, 72 km (45 mi) southwest of Padangsidempuan	6.1	84.0	V	Some houses and a government building damaged in Mandailing Natal Regency.	-	-
4	Philippines, Bicol offshore, 124 km (77 mi) east of Gigmoto	6.2	15.0	IV	-	-	-
4	Panama, Chiriquí offshore, 71 km (44 mi) south of Boca Chica	6.3	16.0	V	Some houses, a school and a hospital slightly damaged in the provinces of Chiriquí, Veraguas and Coclé.	-	-
13	Canada, British Columbia offshore, 238 km (148 mi) southwest of Port McNeill	6.0	7.0	III	-	-	-
14	Indonesia, East Java offshore, 96 km (60 mi) north of Tuban	7.0	597.0	V	One house destroyed and three others damaged in West Java and East Java provinces. In Tabanan, Bali, a 5-year-old boy died after fleeing in panic.	1	-
18	South of the Fiji Islands	6.7	580.0	III	-	-	-
19	Papua New Guinea, West New Britain, 23 km (14 mi) north northeast of Kandrian	6.3	40.0	VI	-	-	-
21	Indonesia, Southeast Sulawesi offshore, 321 km (199 mi) east of Katobu	6.2	4.0	IV	-	-	-
24	New Zealand, Kermadec Islands offshore	7.1	46.8	VII	An 11 cm (0.36 ft) high tsunami was observed in Fishing Rock, Raoul Island.	-	-
24	Indonesia, North Sumatra offshore, 170 km (110 mi) south southeast of Teluk Dalam	7.1	34.0	VIII	One house collapsed and another was damaged in North Sumatra Province, while another house, two hospitals and one school damaged in Mentawai Islands Regency. Power outages affected more than 89,000 homes in West Sumatra and North Sumatra provinces. In Tanahbala Island, South Nias Regency, a tsunami was observed with heights of 11 cm (0.36 ft).	-	-
27	Nepal, Sudurpashchim, 72 km (45 mi) northeast of Dipayal	5.1	10.0	VI	At least 23 houses badly damaged in Bajura District.	-	-
28	South of the Fiji Islands	6.0	587.8	II	Foreshock of the 6.6 event seven seconds later.	-	-
28	South of the Fiji Islands	6.6	563.0	II	-	-	-

=== May ===
May
- Strongest: 7.7 M_{w} New Caledonia
- Deadliest: 6.2 M_{w} Japan; 1 death 5.3 M_{w} Afghanistan; 1 death
- Total fatalities: 2

Number by magnitude
- 9.0+: 0
- 8.0–8.9: 0
- 7.0–7.9: 3
- 6.0–6.9: 12
- 5.0–5.9: 159
- 4.0–4.9: 1,270

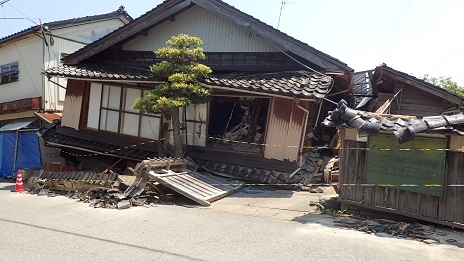
A collapsed house in Ishikawa, Japan.

Date	Country and location	M_{w}	Depth (km)	MMI	Notes	Casualties	
Date	Country and location	M_{w}	Depth (km)	MMI	Notes	Dead	Injured
2	China, Yunnan, 29 km (18 mi) north northeast of Baoshan	5.3	17.9	VII	Ten people injured. Several homes collapsed; 2,805 others and a hospital damaged. Power outages occurred in Baoshan. Rockslides at Wayao.	-	10
4	China, Sichuan, 22 km (14 mi) west southwest of Xuyong	4.8	29.3	VI	At least 748 houses damaged.	-	-
5	Japan, Ishikawa offshore, 49 km (30 mi) northeast of Anamizu	6.2	10.0	VIII	Further information: 2023 Noto earthquake	1	49
5	Japan, Ishikawa, 44 km (27 mi) northeast of Anamizu	5.6	8.2	VII	Aftershock of the 2023 Noto earthquake. A landslide damaged a house and a barn collapsed in Suzu.	-	-
10	Tonga, Niuatoputapu offshore, 95 km (59 mi) west northwest of Hihifo	7.6	210.1	VI	-	-	-
10	Japan, Chiba offshore, 9 km (5.6 mi) west southwest of Katsuura	5.2	35.9	VI	Six people injured in Chiba and three in Kanagawa. At least 23 buildings damaged in the epicentral area.	-	9
17	Guatemala, Quiché, 4 km (2.5 mi) south of Canillá	6.4	252.0	IV	-	-	-
18	Greece, Crete, 7 km (4.3 mi) south southwest of Moires	5.1	9.8	VI	Several houses damaged in Messara. In Heraklion, the balcony and the roof of a house collapsed.	-	-
19	New Caledonia, Loyalty Islands offshore, 339 km (211 mi) east of Vao	7.7	18.0	IV	A 61 cm (2.00 ft) tsunami observed at Lenakel, Vanuatu; 21 cm (0.69 ft) at North Cape, New Zealand; 20 cm (0.66 ft) at Port Kembla, Australia; and 19 cm (0.62 ft) at Ouinne, New Caledonia. Tsunami debris covered the waterfront of Ahipara, New Zealand.	-	-
20	Philippines, Mimaropa offshore, 8 km (5.0 mi) west of Libertad	4.8	10.0	V	Several people injured. Fifteen buildings damaged and landslides occurred in Romblon. One school partially collapsed and another damaged at Odiongan.	-	Several
20	New Caledonia, Loyalty Islands offshore, 306 km (190 mi) east of Vao	7.1	36.0	IV	Aftershock of the magnitude 7.7 earthquake on 19 May. A tsunami measured 14 cm (0.46 ft) at Ouinne.	-	-
20	New Caledonia, Loyalty Islands offshore, 307 km (191 mi) east of Vao	6.5	10.0	V	Aftershock of the magnitude 7.7 and 7.1 earthquakes on 19 and 20 May.	-	-
21	South Africa offshore, Prince Edward Islands region	6.8	10.0	-	-	-	-
21	Solomon Islands, Makira, 55 km (34 mi) west northwest of Kirakira	6.1	77.8	V	-	-	-
22	Iran, East Azerbaijan, 49 km (30 mi) east of Hashtrud	4.5	10.0	V	Eighteen people injured. Three houses collapsed; 439 others damaged in 59 villages around Sarab and Mianeh.	-	18
23	New Caledonia, Loyalty Islands offshore, 288 km (179 mi) east of Vao	6.1	12.1	VI	Aftershock of the magnitude 7.7 and 7.1 earthquakes on 19 and 20 May.	-	-
24	Indonesia, Maluku offshore, 328 km (204 mi) east northeast of Lospalos, East Timor	6.2	166.5	IV	-	-	-
25	Colombia, Chocó offshore, 46 km (29 mi) northeast of Puerto Obaldía, Panama	6.5	13.0	VI	Two hotels and several homes collapsed and some others damaged in Acandí. Some houses and the municipal hall damaged in Necoclí. Ground cracks occurred in Las Changas village and Puerto Escondido. Items knocked from shelves in Las Minas, Panama.	-	-
26	Japan, Chiba offshore, 13 km (8.1 mi) southeast of Narutō	6.1	44.5	V	One person injured in Mito. Minor damage to a building in Asahi.	-	1
26	West Chile Rise	6.0	10.0	-	-	-	-
27	Tonga, Vavaʻu offshore, 127 km (79 mi) west of Neiafu	6.0	223.9	IV	-	-	-
28	Afghanistan, Badakhshan, 35 km (22 mi) southeast of Jurm	5.3	223.8	V	One person killed in Upper Kohistan District, Pakistan. Three people injured when a livestock shed collapsed in Battagram District.	1	3
31	New Zealand, Auckland Islands offshore	6.3	9.8	II	-	-	-
31	Myanmar, Kachin, 121 km (75 mi) west southwest of Myitkyina	5.9	10.0	VIII	Many houses, buildings, schools and some pagodas damaged in Hopin. Ground cracks and liquefaction occurred at Indawgyi.	-	-

=== June ===
June
- Strongest: 7.2 M_{w} Tonga
- Deadliest: 4.9 M_{w} Haiti; 4 deaths
- Total fatalities: 8

Number by magnitude
- 9.0+: 0
- 8.0–8.9: 0
- 7.0–7.9: 1
- 6.0–6.9: 9
- 5.0–5.9: 121
- 4.0–4.9: 1,121

Date	Country and location	M_{w}	Depth (km)	MMI	Notes	Casualties	
Date	Country and location	M_{w}	Depth (km)	MMI	Notes	Dead	Injured
3	Peru, Arequipa, 3 km (1.9 mi) south southeast of Chivay	5.4	10.0	VI	Five buildings collapsed; over 800 homes and 18 buildings damaged in Caylloma. Rockslides blocked roads near the epicenter.	-	-
6	Haiti, Grand'Anse offshore, 9 km (5.6 mi) northeast of Les Abricots	4.9	10.0	VII	Four people killed and 37 others injured. Some homes collapsed and many damaged in Jérémie.	4	37
6	Romania, Arad, 6 km (3.7 mi) southwest of Fântânele	4.7	5.8	VII	Over 100 buildings damaged in Arad County.	-	-
7	Myanmar, Ayeyarwady, 20 km (12 mi) south southwest of Nyaungdon	4.8	10.0	VI	Three people killed and several others injured in Maubin. Some buildings destroyed; several more buildings, a school and pagoda damaged.	3	Several
7	Bulgaria, Plovdiv, 3 km (1.9 mi) southeast of Asenovgrad	4.6	10.0	VII	In Krumovo, many brick walls and chimneys collapsed. Four schools in Asenovgrad and Radovo damaged.	-	-
8	Greece, Central Greece, 6 km (3.7 mi) southwest of Atalanti	4.8	10.0	V	At least 32 houses, six churches and three schools damaged at Atalanti. In Exarchos, the roofs of some houses collapsed. A landslide occurred in Tragána. Subsidence at a beach in northern Evia.	-	-
10	Taiwan, Tainan, 37 km (23 mi) south southeast of Yujing	4.9	26.6	IV	One home collapsed in Madou District.	-	-
11	South Africa, Gauteng, 6 km (3.7 mi) south southeast of Alberton	4.9	10.0	VI	Some buildings damaged in Gauteng. In Ekurhuleni, the ceiling of a building collapsed.	-	-
11	Indonesia, West Java, 16 km (9.9 mi) northeast of Sukabumi	3.3	10.0	-	Two people injured and two homes damaged in Bogor Regency. Dozens of houses damaged in Cianjur Regency.	-	2
11	Japan, Hokkaido offshore, 18 km (11 mi) west southwest of Biratori	6.2	121.0	V	One woman injured at Muroran. Broken windows reported in Obihiro and Abira and the ceiling of a gymnasium collapsed in Biratori.	-	1
13	India, Jammu and Kashmir, 22 km (14 mi) northeast of Bhadarwāh	5.2	10.0	VII	Six people injured. 56 buildings collapsed and 369 others damaged in Kishtwar. Dozens of buildings including a hospital damaged in Bhaderwah and Doda.	-	6
15	Philippines, Calabarzon offshore, 11 km (6.8 mi) south southeast of Hukay	6.2	112.0	V	Forty-two people injured in Laguna and Batangas provinces. One hundred and sixteen buildings damaged throughout Calabarzon and Mimaropa regions. Two stations of Metro Rail Transit Line 3 affected.	-	42
15	Tonga, Tongatapu offshore, 280 km (170 mi) southwest of Houma	7.2	175.0	VI	-	-	-
16	Tonga, ʻAta offshore, 265 km (165 mi) south southwest of 'Ohonua	6.0	22.0	-	Foreshock of the magnitude 6.2 earthquake that same day.	-	-
16	France, Nouvelle-Aquitaine, 5 km (3.1 mi) south southeast of Mauzé-sur-le-Mignon	4.8	5.0	VI	Two people injured. More than 100 buildings destroyed and more than 5,000 others damaged, rockslides and power outages occurred in Deux-Sèvres, Charente-Maritime, and Vendee departments.	-	2
16	Tonga, ʻAta offshore, 251 km (156 mi) south southwest of 'Ohonua	6.2	20.5	-	-	-	-
17	Tonga, ʻAta offshore, 237 km (147 mi) south southwest of 'Ohonua	6.0	35.0	-	-	-	-
17	Iran, West Azerbaijan, 10 km (6.2 mi) south southwest of Khowy	4.5	10.0	V	Thirty-five people injured in Khoy.	-	35
18	Ecuador, Napo, 36 km (22 mi) northeast of Archidona	5.1	30.3	V	One person injured by broken glass in Archidona.	-	1
18	Mexico, Baja California Sur offshore, 105 km (65 mi) east southeast of La Rivera	6.4	10.0	V	-	-	-
18	South of Africa	6.0	10.0	-	-	-	-
19	Papua New Guinea, East Sepik Province, 96 km (60 mi) east southeast of Angoram	6.2	23.8	VII	-	-	-
25	Tonga, ʻEua offshore, 307 km (191 mi) south southwest of 'Ohonua	6.2	9.0	-	-	-	-
27	Ecuador, Esmeraldas, 5 km (3.1 mi) east of Muisne	5.0	35.0	VI	One person injured; 20 buildings and a road damaged; power outages in Muisne.	-	1
28	Thailand, Kamphaeng Phet, 26 km (16 mi) northwest of Bueng Na Rang	4.1	10.1	V	One house partially collapsed and more than 66 buildings damaged in Mueang Phichit and Bang Krathum districts.	-	-
28	Iran, Ilam, 14 km (8.7 mi) southeast of Dehloran	4.6	15.5	IV	One person injured in Dehloran.	-	1
30	Indonesia, Yogyakarta offshore, 83 km (52 mi) south southwest of Srandakan	5.9	71.0	IV	One woman died of a heart attack and 23 others injured. More than 22 buildings collapsed and 696 others damaged in Central Java, East Java and the Special Region of Yogyakarta.	1	23

=== July ===
July
- Strongest: 7.2 M_{w} United States
- Total fatalities: 0

Number by magnitude
- 9.0+: 0
- 8.0–8.9: 0
- 7.0–7.9: 1
- 6.0–6.9: 7
- 5.0–5.9: 100
- 4.0–4.9: 1,008

Date	Country and location	M_{w}	Depth (km)	MMI	Notes	Casualties	
Date	Country and location	M_{w}	Depth (km)	MMI	Notes	Dead	Injured
2	Tonga, Vavaʻu offshore, 134 km (83 mi) northwest of Neiafu	6.9	225.0	IV	-	-	-
6	Poland, Lower Silesia, 2 km (1.2 mi) east southeast of Polkowice	4.5	2.7	IV	Seven people injured in the Lubin mine.	-	7
10	Antigua and Barbuda, Barbuda offshore, 277 km (172 mi) north northeast of Codrington	6.6	10.0	IV	-	-	-
14	Mexico, Chiapas offshore, 87 km (54 mi) southwest of El Palmarcito	6.3	35.0	IV	-	-	-
15	Ecuador, Pichincha, 5 km (3.1 mi) west northwest of Oyambarillo	4.5	12.7	IV	Four people injured, nine buildings damaged and landslides in Quito.	-	4
16	United States, Alaska offshore, 98 km (61 mi) south of Sand Point	7.2	25.0	VII	A tsunami was observed with heights of 15 cm (0.49 ft) in Sand Point and King Cove.	-	-
17	Argentina, Neuquén, 18 km (11 mi) southeast of Loncopué	6.6	186.0	VII	Communications disrupted in parts of Chile.	-	-
17	Peru, Huanuco, 15 km (9.3 mi) southeast of Tingo María	4.8	32.6	V	One home collapsed and eight others damaged in Pillco Marca District.	-	-
19	El Salvador, La Unión offshore, 43 km (27 mi) south of Intipucá	6.5	69.7	VI	Two people injured. At least 13 buildings including a hospital damaged in the departments of San Miguel, Usulután and Sonsonate. Electricity and telephone lines disrupted. Landslides occurred in several areas, including one which blocked a portion of the Pan-American Highway.	-	2
20	India, Rajasthan, 11 km (6.8 mi) east southeast of Jaipur	4.3	10.0	VII	At least 15 people injured and minor damage in Jaipur.	-	15
24	South of the Fiji Islands	6.0	546.0	II	-	-	-
24	Chile, O'Higgins, 25 km (16 mi) east northeast of Machalí	4.3	1.4	-	At least 17 people injured due to a mine collapse at the El Teniente mine.	-	17
25	Turkey, Adana, 18 km (11 mi) northeast of Kozan	5.5	11.6	VI	Aftershock of the 2023 Turkey–Syria earthquakes. At least 63 people injured in Adana and Osmaniye Provinces; at least eight hospitalized. One home collapsed; 18 buildings damaged in Kozan. One home damaged by rockfalls in Sumbas.	-	63
26	Vanuatu, Penama offshore, 95 km (59 mi) east northeast of Port Olry	6.4	13.0	VI	Some homes damaged by landslides in Merelava.	-	-
30	Colombia, Antioquia offshore, 28 km (17 mi) northwest of Arboletes	5.3	56.3	VII	One homes collapsed in Puerto Escondido.	-	-

=== August ===
August
- Strongest: 7.1 M_{w} Indonesia
- Deadliest: 6.1 M_{w} Colombia; 2 deaths
- Total fatalities: 2

Number by magnitude
- 9.0+: 0
- 8.0–8.9: 0
- 7.0–7.9: 1
- 6.0–6.9: 8
- 5.0–5.9: 97
- 4.0–4.9: 991

Date	Country and location	M_{w}	Depth (km)	MMI	Notes	Casualties	
Date	Country and location	M_{w}	Depth (km)	MMI	Notes	Dead	Injured
1	Eritrea, Debub, 43 km (27 mi) north northeast of Adi Keyh	5.6	10.0	VII	Five homes collapsed in Senafe.	-	-
4	Indonesia, Riau, 53 km (33 mi) east northeast of Sijunjung	3.9	10.0	-	One house collapsed and more than 51 others, a hospital, and a school damaged in Kuantan Singingi Regency.	-	-
5	Argentina, Santiago del Estero, 39 km (24 mi) southeast of Suncho Corral	6.2	597.7	II	-	-	-
5	China, Shandong, 24 km (15 mi) south of Dezhou	5.4	18.0	VII	Twenty-four people injured and 213 buildings damaged in the Dezhou-Liaocheng area.	-	24
5	Australia, Western Australia, 69 km (43 mi) east of Katanning	5.2	10.0	VII	One building destroyed and another damaged in Gnowangerup.	-	-
6	Indonesia, Central Sulawesi, 48 km (30 mi) east southeast of Palu	5.3	10.0	V	One person injured, 14 homes destroyed, at least 281 others, three schools and two churches damaged and landslides in Sigi Regency.	-	1
9	Tonga, Niuas offshore, 108 km (67 mi) northeast of Hihifo	6.1	42.0	IV	-	-	-
10	Turkey, Malatya, 3 km (1.9 mi) southwest of Yeşilyurt	5.2	10.0	VI	Aftershock of the 2023 Turkey–Syria earthquakes. At least 22 people injured in Malatya and one injured in Adıyaman. One building collapsed and two heavily damaged in Malatya.	-	23
13	Greece, Crete, 17 km (11 mi) east northeast of Palaióchora	5.1	10.0	IV	One person injured by rockfalls while hiking at the Samariá Gorge.	-	1
14	South Africa offshore, Prince Edward Islands region	6.0	10.0	-	-	-	-
14	Northern Mariana Islands, Tinian offshore, 271 km (168 mi) southeast of San Jose Village	6.1	10.0	III	-	-	-
15	India, Rajasthan, 19 km (12 mi) east northeast of Gulabpura	3.6	10.0	-	One home collapsed and many others damaged in Bhinai.	-	-
16	Turkmenistan, Balkan, 30 km (19 mi) north northeast of Türkmenbaşy	5.1	53.6	IV	Twenty buildings severely damaged in Gyzylsuw; some buildings damaged in Türkmenbaşy.	-	-
16	Vanuatu, Torba offshore, 42 km (26 mi) west of Sola	6.5	193.0	IV	-	-	-
17	Indonesia, West Java offshore, 124 km (77 mi) west southwest of Palabuhanratu	5.4	54.8	IV	One person injured by falling bricks and three homes damaged in Bogor Regency. One house destroyed in West Bandung Regency.	-	1
17	central Mid-Atlantic Ridge	6.0	10.0	-	-	-	-
17	Colombia, Meta, 10 km (6.2 mi) north northwest of Restrepo	6.1	10.0	VII	Further information: 2023 central Colombia earthquakes	2	50
17	Colombia, Meta, 2 km (1.2 mi) east of Restrepo	5.6	10.0	VIII	Further information: 2023 central Colombia earthquakes	2	50
18	Iran, Fars, 29 km (18 mi) northwest of Gerash	4.8	10.0	VII	Sixteen people injured and more than 300 homes damaged or destroyed in Evaz.	-	16
22	Azerbaijan, Masally, 4 km (2.5 mi) east southeast of Masally	4.8	55.2	V	One home destroyed and several damaged in Masallı.	-	-
23	China, Liaoning, 15 km (9.3 mi) east of Pulandian	4.7	10.0	V	One home destroyed and 15 damaged in Pulandian.	-	-
23	Argentina, Santiago del Estero, 16 km (9.9 mi) southeast of El Hoyo	6.2	568.8	II	-	-	-
24	Turkey, Malatya, 11 km (6.8 mi) southwest of Yeşilyurt	4.8	10.0	V	Aftershock of the 2023 Turkey–Syria earthquakes. One person injured and one building damaged in Malatya.	-	1
25	Philippines, Soccsksargen, 4 km (2.5 mi) east northeast of Lake Sebu	5.0	15.0	VI	One person injured, one bridge destroyed, two homes, the municipal hall, and some roads damaged and landslides in T'Boli.	-	1
28	Indonesia, East Java offshore, 171 km (106 mi) east northeast of Gili Air	7.1	513.5	IV	-	-	-
29	Turkey, Konya, 19 km (12 mi) southwest of Kulu	4.8	6.5	IV	One chimney collapsed; one home, a mosque and three schools damaged in Kulu.	-	-
31	Angola, Bié, 109 km (68 mi) south of Cuíto	4.3	10.0	IV	Three people injured in Cuíto.	-	3

=== September ===
September
- Strongest: 6.8 M_{w} Morocco
- Deadliest: 6.8 M_{w} Morocco; 2,960 deaths
- Total fatalities: 2,961

Number by magnitude
- 9.0+: 0
- 8.0–8.9: 0
- 7.0–7.9: 0
- 6.0–6.9: 11
- 5.0–5.9: 106
- 4.0–4.9: 994

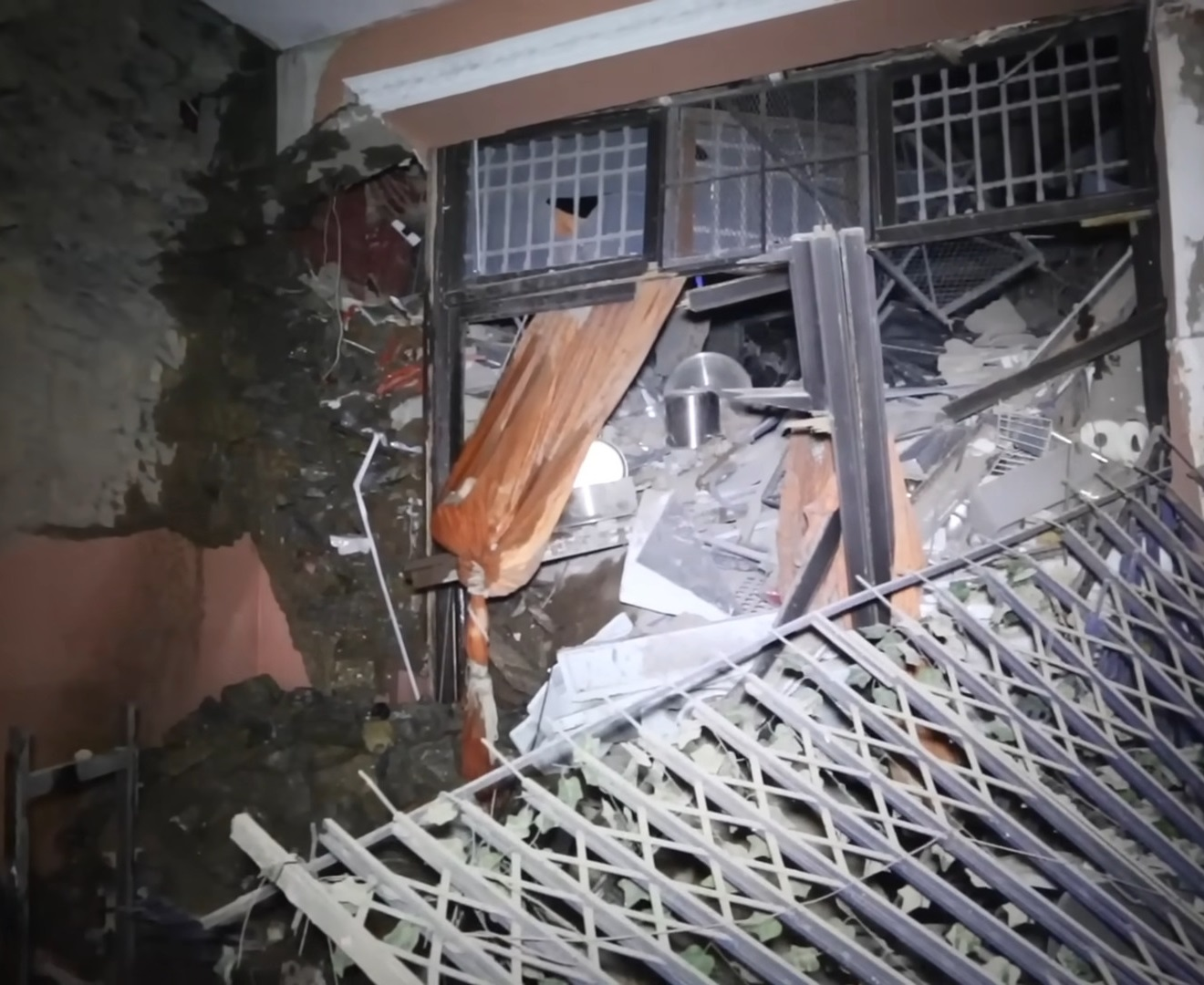
Destroyed house in Marrakesh, Morocco.

Date	Country and location	M_{w}	Depth (km)	MMI	Notes	Casualties	
Date	Country and location	M_{w}	Depth (km)	MMI	Notes	Dead	Injured
1	Russia, Kuril Islands offshore, 11 km (6.8 mi) east northeast of Severo-Kurilsk	6.1	146.0	IV	-	-	-
3	Azerbaijan, Central Aran, 7 km (4.3 mi) east southeast of Kurdamir	4.9	68.3	VI	Some buildings destroyed and 100 others damaged in Kurdamir District.	-	-
4	Iran, Bushehr, 87 km (54 mi) west northwest of Mohr	4.3	10.0	-	Four people injured in Bandar-e Deyr.	-	4
5	Taiwan, Chiayi, 15 km (9.3 mi) west northwest of Pizitou	4.9	11.7	V	One home destroyed in Minxiong; two schools destroyed and eight others damaged in Xingang.	-	-
6	Philippines, Davao, 4 km (2.5 mi) east-southeast of Bato	4.9	10.6	IV	At least 125 people injured due to panic. Three homes severely damaged and eight others and five schools damaged in Davao City.	-	125
6	Chile, Coquimbo offshore, 38 km (24 mi) south southwest of Coquimbo	6.3	36.0	VI	Some buildings and a factory damaged and power outages in Coquimbo.	-	-
8	New Zealand, south of the Kermadec Islands	6.6	89.8	VI	-	-	-
8	Argentina, Neuquén, 2 km (1.2 mi) southwest of Cutral Có	4.2	10.0	-	Some homes collapsed, some others damaged and rockfalls in Sauzal Bonito.	-	-
8	Morocco, Al Haouz, 56 km (35 mi) west of Oukaïmedene	6.8	19.0	IX	Further information: 2023 Al Haouz earthquake	2,960	5,674
9	Indonesia, Central Sulawesi offshore, 101 km (63 mi) north of Palu	6.0	9.9	VII	Three homes damaged in Donggala Regency.	-	-
11	Indonesia, North Maluku, 38 km (24 mi) north northeast of Ternate	6.0	162.5	IV	One building destroyed in Manado.	-	-
11	Indonesia, West Java, 21 km (13 mi) northeast of Sukabumi	3.1	10.0	-	The walls of several homes collapsed in Cianjur Regency.	-	-
12	Philippines, Cagayan Valley offshore, 69 km (43 mi) north of Namuac	6.2	31.1	VI	Five people injured, two homes destroyed and three schools damaged in Calayan.	-	5
13	West Chile Rise	6.1	10.0	-	-	-	-
13	Morocco, Al Haouz, 58 km (36 mi) west northwest of Oukaïmedene	4.2	10.0	-	Aftershock of the 2023 Al Haouz earthquake. One person injured by rockfalls in Imi N'Tala.	-	1
18	Italy, Tuscany, 5 km (3.1 mi) southeast of Marradi	5.1	10.0	VI	One person killed in Modigliana and another injured in Tredozio. Six buildings severely damaged and many others affected in Portico e San Benedetto, Rocca San Casciano, Marradi and Tredozio.	1	1
18	Japan, Okinawa offshore, 181 km (112 mi) north of Hirara	6.3	183.5	IV	-	-	-
21	Vanuatu, Torba offshore, 41 km (25 mi) west southwest of Sola	6.1	188.4	IV	-	-	-
23	Myanmar, Yangon, 39 km (24 mi) north of Yangon	4.8	10.0	V	One building destroyed in Bago; one building destroyed and two damaged in Hmawbi.	-	-
24	Rwanda, Southern, 11 km (6.8 mi) north of Nzega	4.5	10.0	V	Two people injured; 11 homes and two schools affected in Karongi District.	-	2
24	Peru, Ayacucho, 20 km (12 mi) southwest of Ayna	4.3	10.0	III	One person injured by rockfalls in Huamanguilla District and one building damaged in Uchuraccay.	-	1
28	Vanuatu, Penama offshore, 60 km (37 mi) east of Luganville	6.1	127.5	IV	-	-	-

=== October ===
October
- Strongest: 6.9 M_{w} Papua New Guinea
- Deadliest: 6.3 M_{w} Afghanistan; 1,482 deaths
- Total fatalities: 1,491

Number by magnitude
- 9.0+: 0
- 8.0–8.9: 0
- 7.0–7.9: 0
- 6.0–6.9: 17
- 5.0–5.9: 162
- 4.0–4.9: 1,211

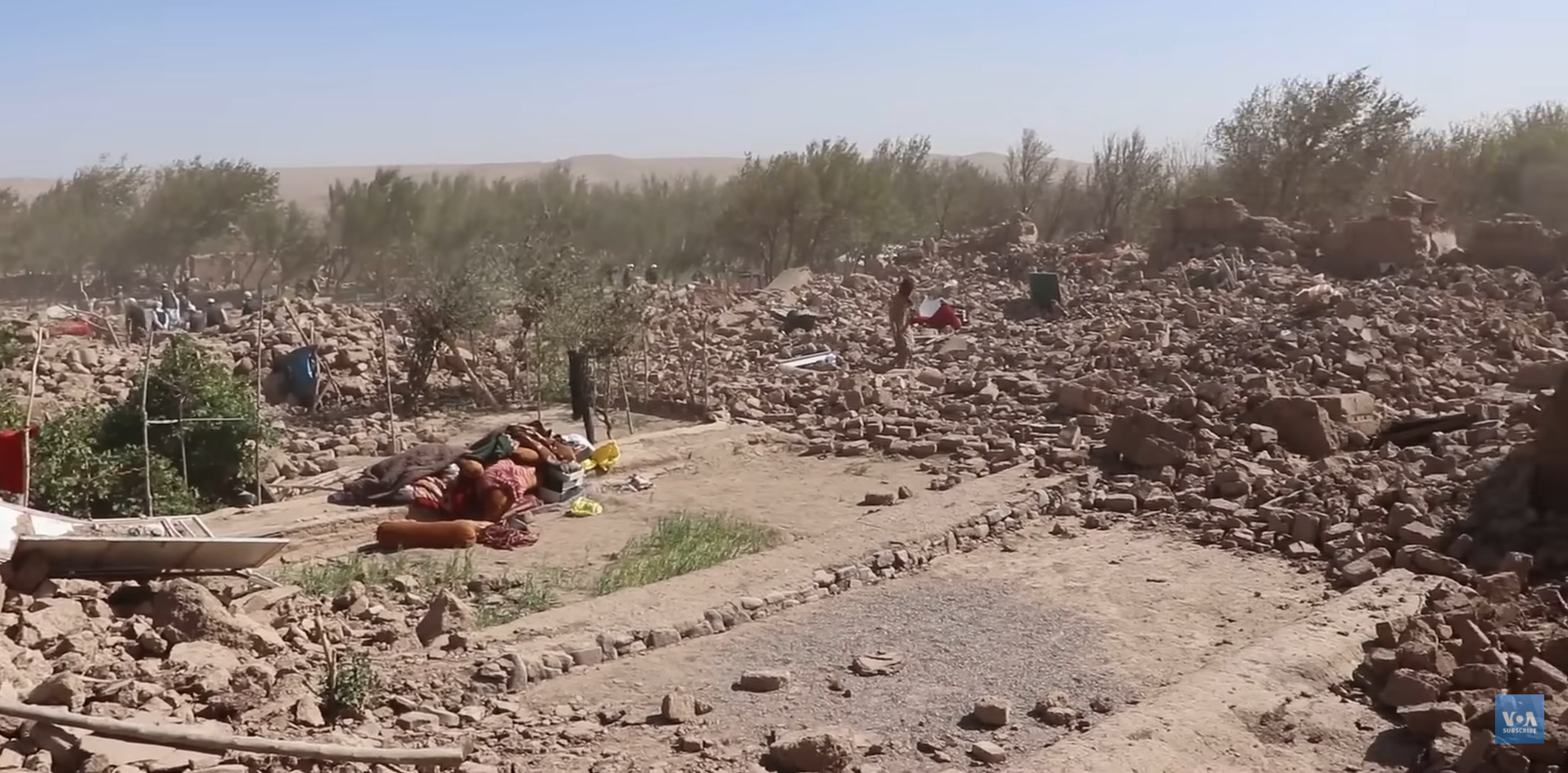
Destroyed village in Herat Province, Afghanistan.

Date	Country and location	M_{w}	Depth (km)	MMI	Notes	Casualties	
Date	Country and location	M_{w}	Depth (km)	MMI	Notes	Dead	Injured
1	Indonesia, West Java, 12 km (7.5 mi) south of Cicurug	5.3	109.9	III	Two homes collapsed and another damaged in Sukabumi Regency. Three homes destroyed; five others damaged in Caringin.	-	-
2	Bosnia and Herzegovina, West Herzegovina, 3 km (1.9 mi) southwest of Grude	4.5	10.0	V	One home severely damaged by rockfalls in Sovići and several others damaged in Grude.	-	-
2	Italy, Campania offshore, 7 km (4.3 mi) southeast of Procida	3.4	9.6	III	Dozens of buildings including a school affected in Agnano and Bagnoli.	-	-
3	Nepal, Sudurpashchim, 40 km (25 mi) northeast of Dipayal	5.7	20.1	VII	One woman killed by a landslide and 27 people injured. At least 1,567 houses destroyed, 5,601 others damaged, landslides and power outages in Achham, Baitadi, Bajhang and Bajura districts. One home collapsed in Someshwar and many others damaged in Pithoragarh, India.	1	27
3	Japan, Izu Islands offshore	6.0	10.0	IV	-	-	-
4	Philippines, Cagayan Valley offshore, 65 km (40 mi) north of Namuac	5.7	27.0	V	Two people injured in Calayan.	-	2
4	Philippines, Davao offshore, 66 km (41 mi) east of Sarangani	6.4	113.0	V	Thirteen people injured and 21 buildings damaged in Davao City. Three buildings damaged in Malita, one home and a church damaged in Sarangani, and minor damage to stores in General Santos. Power outages in Mati.	-	13
5	Japan, Izu Islands offshore	6.1	10.0	IV	A tsunami with a height of 30 cm (12 in) observed in Hachijō-jima.	-	-
6	Japan, Izu Islands offshore	6.1	10.0	IV	-	-	-
7	Mexico, Oaxaca, 8 km (5.0 mi) west of Cuauhtémoc	5.9	108.4	V	Many buildings, a church, a hospital, and some historic buildings affected, landslides and power outages in Oaxaca and other areas near the epicenter.	-	-
7	Nepal, Sudurpashchim, 38 km (24 mi) northeast of Dipayal	5.0	24.5	V	One person injured and one home partially collapsed in Masta Rural Municipality.	-	1
7	Afghanistan, Herat, 35 km (22 mi) north northeast of Zindah Jan	6.3	10.0	VIII	Further information: 2023 Herat earthquakes	1,482	2,102
7	Afghanistan, Herat, 26 km (16 mi) north northeast of Zindah Jan	6.3	10.0	VIII	Further information: 2023 Herat earthquakes	1,482	2,102
7	Papua New Guinea, Madang, 56 km (35 mi) southeast of Madang	6.7	53.5	VI	One person killed, nine others injured, 200 houses destroyed, damage to the runway of Madang Airport, power outages and an oil pipeline ruptured in Madang and Rai Coast District.	1	9
7	Papua New Guinea, Madang offshore, 52 km (32 mi) southeast of Madang	6.9	74.0	VI	One person killed, nine others injured, 200 houses destroyed, damage to the runway of Madang Airport, power outages and an oil pipeline ruptured in Madang and Rai Coast District.	1	9
9	Slovakia, Prešov, 16 km (9.9 mi) south southeast of Stropkov	5.0	8.3	VIII	Largest earthquake in the area since 1930. Sixteen houses destroyed, over 1,000 others damaged and power outages in Humenné, Michalovce, Girovce, and Ďapalovce.	-	-
10	Argentina, Jujuy, 57 km (35 mi) west southwest of Abra Pampa	6.0	247.3	IV	-	-	-
11	Afghanistan, Herat, 27 km (17 mi) north northwest of Herat	6.3	9.0	VIII	Further information: 2023 Herat earthquakes	3	169
11	Australia, Macquarie Island offshore	6.3	4.8	-	-	-	-
12	Honduras, Comayagua, 13 km (8.1 mi) north northeast of La Libertad	4.6	10.0	V	One home in Comayagua and eight others in La Libertad destroyed and 38 others affected to some extent in Las Lajas.	-	-
15	Afghanistan, Herat, 30 km (19 mi) north northwest of Herat	6.3	6.3	VIII	Further information: 2023 Herat earthquakes	4	162
15	Iran, Khuzestan, 21 km (13 mi) south southwest of Ramhormoz	5.3	10.0	VI	One school collapsed and several homes damaged in Ramshir.	-	-
16	United States, Alaska offshore, 65 km (40 mi) north northwest of Adak	6.4	187.4	IV	-	-	-
19	Indonesia, West Java offshore, 78 km (48 mi) south southwest of Banjar	5.2	59.7	V	One home collapsed in Pangandaran Regency and another damaged in Garut.	-	-
19	Iran, Fars, 40 km (25 mi) east of Kazerun	4.8	10.0	IV	Seven people injured and several homes damaged in Khaneh Zenyan.	-	7
21	Australia, Victoria, 15 km (9.3 mi) west-northwest of Apollo Bay	4.8	10.0	VI	One wall partially fell in Brighton and two homes damaged in Colac.	-	-
22	Nepal, Bagmati, 35 km (22 mi) northeast of Bharatpur	5.2	24.7	V	One person injured in Gorkha. At least 20 homes destroyed, 75 others damaged and landslides in Dhading District.	-	1
23	New Zealand, Kermadec Islands offshore	6.0	23.1	IV	-	-	-
28	Afghanistan, Herat, 24 km (15 mi) north northwest of Herat	5.0	10.0	VI	Part of the 2023 Herat earthquake sequence: Thirteen people injured, several previously damaged homes collapsed and minor damage in Herat.	-	13
29	Vanuatu, Tafea offshore, 55 km (34 mi) west northwest of Isangel	6.0	79.9	V	-	-	-
30	Jamaica, Portland, 4 km (2.5 mi) west northwest of Hope Bay	5.4	10.0	VII	Forty-one people injured or hospitalized. One building destroyed, many others including a factory damaged and power outages in Kingston. One building collapsed in Hope Bay.	-	41
30	Cape Verde, Brava offshore	4.8	4.5	-	One person injured and four homes damaged in Brava. One home collapsed in Ribeira da Garça and several others damaged in Nova Sintra.	-	1
31	Fiji, Eastern offshore, 187 km (116 mi) east northeast of Levuka	6.5	549.8	III	-	-	-
31	Chile, Atacama offshore, 81 km (50 mi) west southwest of Vallenar	6.6	34.0	VII	One home destroyed by rockfalls in Las Breas, six others damaged in Vallenar, minor damage in San Félix and Freirina, and power outages in La Serena. Some landslides in the epicentral area.	-	-

=== November ===
November
- Strongest: 7.1 M_{w} Indonesia
- Deadliest: 5.7 M_{w} Nepal; 153 deaths
- Total fatalities: 165

Number by magnitude
- 9.0+: 0
- 8.0–8.9: 0
- 7.0–7.9: 1
- 6.0–6.9: 11
- 5.0–5.9: 135
- 4.0–4.9: 1,236

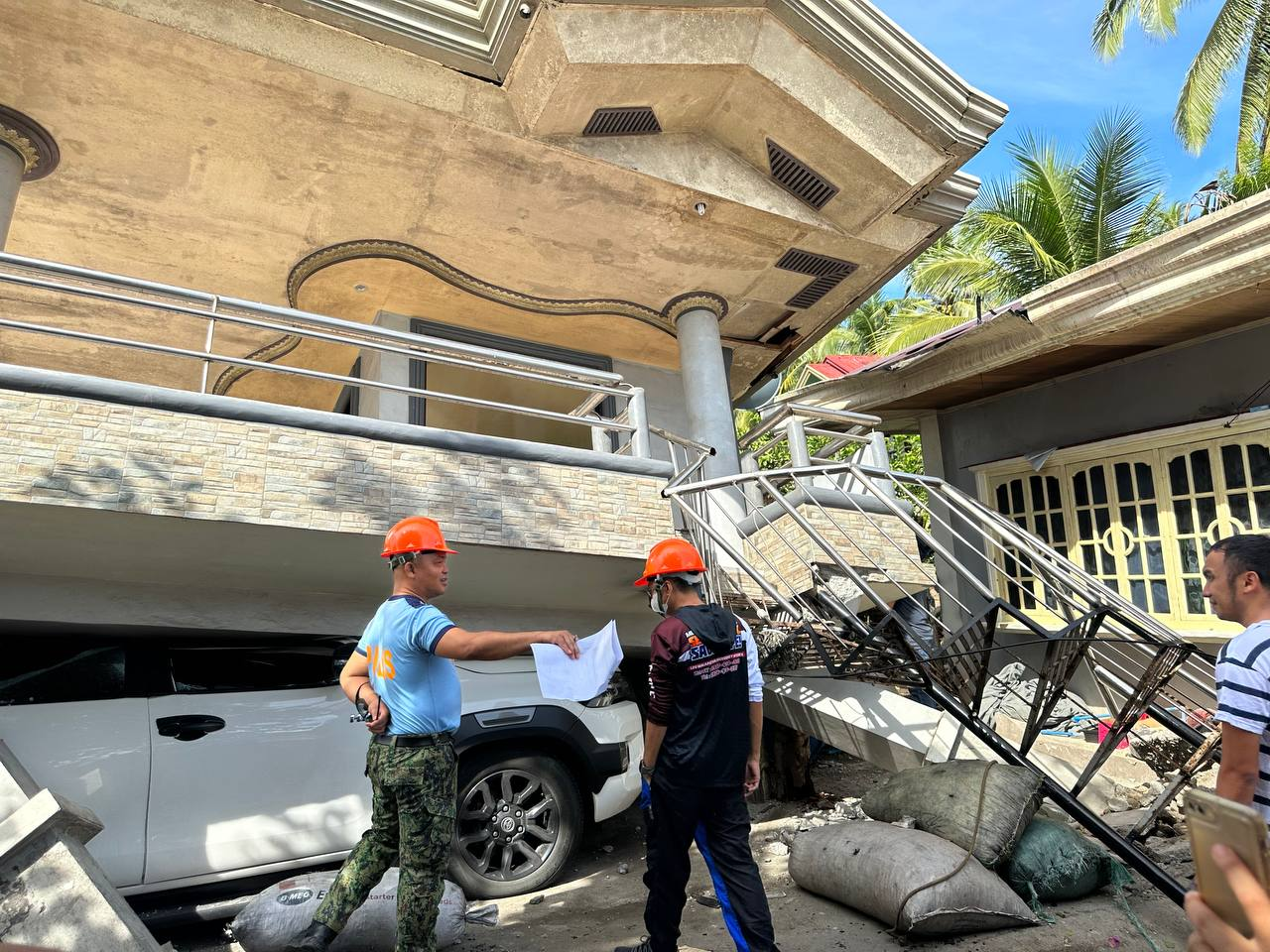
Collapsed house in Sarangani, Philippines.

Date	Country and location	M_{w}	Depth (km)	MMI	Notes	Casualties	
Date	Country and location	M_{w}	Depth (km)	MMI	Notes	Dead	Injured
1	Iran, South Khorasan, 99 km (62 mi) south southeast of Birjand	4.7	10.0	V	One person injured, one home destroyed and several others and some mosques damaged.	-	1
1	Indonesia, East Nusa Tenggara, 22 km (14 mi) northeast of Kupang	6.1	36.1	VI	At least 145 structures damaged in Kupang Regency, 24 in Kupang, and one in South Central Timor Regency.	-	-
3	Greece, Central Greece, 8 km (5.0 mi) southeast of Prokopi	5.1	9.9	IV	Several buildings and stores damaged in Prokopi. In Mantoudi, the ceiling of a school collapsed.	-	-
3	Nepal, Karnali, 46 km (29 mi) east of Dailekh	5.7	16.5	VIII	Further information: 2023 Nepal earthquake	153	375
6	Nepal, Karnali, 37 km (23 mi) east northeast of Dailekh	5.3	10.0	IV	Aftershock of the 2023 Nepal earthquake. Sixteen people injured and three houses collapsed in West Rukum and Jajarkot districts.	-	16
7	Ecuador, Cotopaxi, 7 km (4.3 mi) northwest of La Maná	5.0	18.9	V	Four people injured, several homes and a health center damaged and power outages in Valencia. Six homes damaged in La Maná. One house collapsed and several others damaged in Buena Fe.	-	4
8	Indonesia, Banda Sea offshore	6.7	10.0	VI	Foreshock of the magnitude 7.1 event a minute later.	-	-
8	Indonesia, Banda Sea offshore	7.1	10.0	VI	A tsunami was observed with wave heights of 39 cm (15 in) at Damar.	-	-
8	Iran, Ardabil, 13 km (8.1 mi) west of Bileh Savar	4.8	52.6	IV	Five people injured and minor damage in Bileh Savar.	-	5
8	United States, Texas, 37 km (23 mi) west southwest of Mentone	5.2	7.4	VI	Some injuries in Mentone and in other areas near the epicenter.	-	Some
8	Indonesia, Banda Sea offshore	6.7	10.0	VI	Aftershock of the magnitude 7.1 event a few hours earlier.	-	-
10	Dominican Republic, Monte Cristi, 7 km (4.3 mi) west northwest of Las Matas de Santa Cruz	5.0	19.0	VI	One store destroyed, many buildings including two schools, a hospital, several malls and a police station damaged in Villa Vásquez and Santiago.	-	-
10	Iceland, Southern Peninsula offshore, 5 km (3.1 mi) west northwest of Grindavík	5.2	10.0	IV	Further information: 2023 Sundhnúkur eruption	-	-
10	Iceland, Southern Peninsula offshore, 2 km (1.2 mi) north of Vogar	5.3	10.0	VIII	Further information: 2023 Sundhnúkur eruption	-	-
10	Indonesia, Banda Sea offshore	6.1	10.7	VI	Aftershock of the magnitude 7.1 event two days earlier.	-	-
13	Papua New Guinea, New Ireland offshore, 135 km (84 mi) west northwest of Rabaul	6.1	10.0	IV	-	-	-
13	Iran, West Azerbaijan, 24 km (15 mi) southwest of Sharur, Azerbaijan	4.3	17.0	IV	Five people injured in Showt.	-	5
14	South Indian Ocean	6.1	10.0	-	-	-	-
17	Myanmar, Shan, 76 km (47 mi) southwest of Keng Tung	5.7	10.4	VII	Some homes damaged in Keng Tung. One person injured, two homes, 16 hospitals, and 28 schools damaged in Chiang Rai, Chiang Mai, and Sakon Nakhon provinces, Thailand.	-	1
17	Philippines, Soccsksargen offshore, 26 km (16 mi) west southwest of Burias	6.7	52.0	VIII	Further information: November 2023 Mindanao earthquake	11	730
17	Indonesia, West Java offshore, 48 km (30 mi) south southwest of Banjar	4.9	63.3	III	One house collapsed in Sukabumi Regency.	-	-
20	Iran, Sistan and Baluchistan, 19 km (12 mi) east southeast of Zahedan	4.6	10.0	V	Seventy-one people injured in Zahedan.	-	71
21	Poland, Silesia, near Myslowice	1.9	0.7	-	Two people injured at a mine near Myslowice.	-	2
22	Indonesia, North Maluku offshore, 93 km (58 mi) west of Tobelo	6.0	119.2	V	One person died in Ternate due to panic.	1	-
22	Vanuatu, Penama offshore, 96 km (60 mi) east of Port-Olry	6.7	13.0	VII	A tsunami with a height of 3 cm (1.2 in) was recorded at Litzlitz.	-	-
24	Northern Mariana Islands, Maug Islands offshore	6.9	16.0	VI	-	-	-
27	Papua New Guinea, East Sepik offshore, 45 km (28 mi) east of Wewak	6.5	8.0	VII	-	-	-

=== December ===
December
- Strongest: 7.6 M_{w} Philippines
- Deadliest: 5.9 M_{w} China; 151 deaths
- Total fatalities: 154

Number by magnitude
- 9.0+: 0
- 8.0–8.9: 0
- 7.0–7.9: 2
- 6.0–6.9: 12
- 5.0–5.9: 256
- 4.0–4.9: 1,114

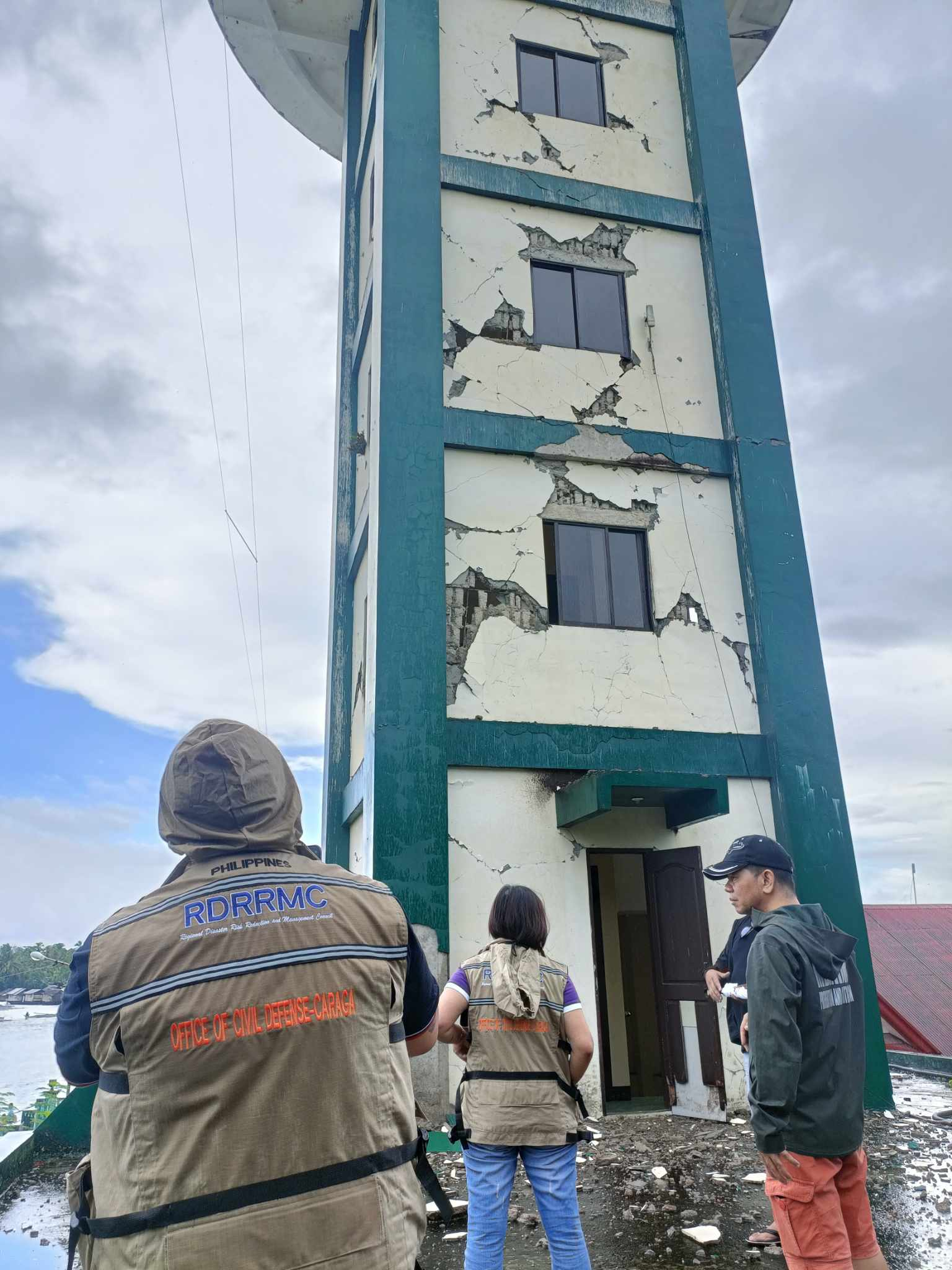
Damaged PAGASA Doppler weather radar station in Hinatuan, Philippines.

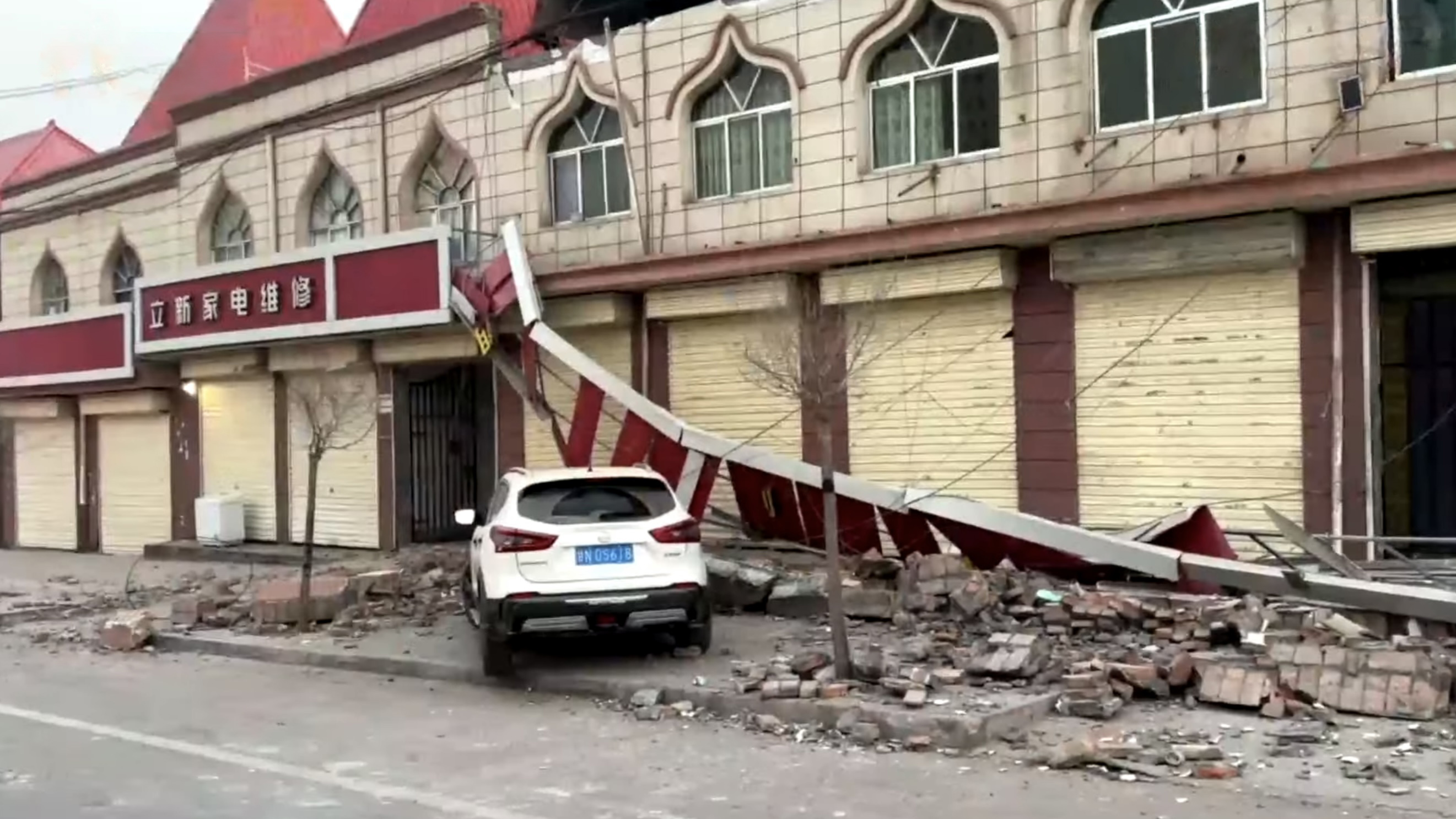
Earthquake aftermath in Jishishan County, China.

Date	Country and location	M_{w}	Depth (km)	MMI	Notes	Casualties	
Date	Country and location	M_{w}	Depth (km)	MMI	Notes	Dead	Injured
1	China, Yunnan, 16 km (9.9 mi) west of Zhefang	5.0	21.4	V	Damage to 144 homes in Xishan Township.	-	-
2	Bangladesh, Chittagong, 10 km (6.2 mi) east northeast of Ramganj	5.5	38.5	V	Two-hundred people injured and one mosque damaged in Comilla. Ten people injured in Chandpur, two others in Nangalkot, another injured and one building damaged in Dhaka, and one house damaged in Senbagh. One house destroyed and 11 others damaged in Tripura, India.	-	213
2	Philippines, Caraga, 12 km (7.5 mi) north of Hinatuan	7.6	40.0	VII	Further information: December 2023 Mindanao earthquake	3	79
2	Philippines, Caraga offshore, 40 km (25 mi) north of Hinatuan	6.4	35.0	VI	Aftershocks of the 7.6 event.	-	-
2	Philippines, Caraga offshore, 42 km (26 mi) northeast of Barcelona	6.1	50.6	V	Aftershocks of the 7.6 event.	-	-
2	Philippines, Caraga offshore, 47 km (29 mi) east northeast of Barcelona	6.0	9.0	V	Aftershocks of the 7.6 event.	-	-
2	Philippines, Caraga offshore, 62 km (39 mi) east northeast of Barcelona	6.2	54.9	V	Aftershocks of the 7.6 event.	-	-
3	Philippines, Caraga offshore, 43 km (27 mi) east northeast of Hinatuan	6.6	56.2	VI	Aftershocks of the 7.6 event.	-	-
3	Philippines, Caraga offshore, 35 km (22 mi) east northeast of Aras-asan	6.9	30.5	VI	Aftershocks of the 7.6 event.	-	-
4	Pakistan, Balochistan, 65 km (40 mi) south southwest of Khuzdar	5.2	10.0	IX	One person injured and many homes severely damaged in the Khuzdar area.	-	1
7	Vanuatu, Tafea offshore, 123 km (76 mi) south of Isangel	7.1	48.4	VI	An 8 cm (0.26 ft) high tsunami was observed in Lenakel.	-	-
7	Indonesia, West Java offshore, 2 km (1.2 mi) west of Pelabuhanratu	3.9	9.5	VI	Fourteen homes collapsed, 256 others and six buildings damaged, and ground cracks appeared in Sukabumi and Bogor regencies.	-	-
7	Mexico, Puebla, 8 km (5.0 mi) south southeast of Buenavista de Benito Juárez	5.7	51.2	V	One person injured in Taxco. Two buildings destroyed and many others damaged in Puebla.	-	1
11	Tonga, Vava'u offshore, 158 km (98 mi) west of Neiafu	6.1	238.4	IV	-	-	-
13	Indonesia, West Java, 14 km (8.7 mi) north northwest of Pelabuhanratu	4.5	10.4	V	Two people injured, 48 homes collapsed, 1,076 others and nine buildings damaged in the Bogor-Sukabumi area.	-	2
15	Indonesia, Central Java, 20 km (12 mi) north northeast of Majenang	4.2	9.2	V	One home collapsed and 23 others damaged in Brebes Regency.	-	-
16	Indonesia, West Sumatra offshore, 144 km (89 mi) west northwest of Pariaman	5.0	52.4	IV	One home destroyed by a landslide in Lima Puluh Kota Regency.	-	-
18	China, Gansu, 37 km (23 mi) west northwest of Linxia Chengguanzhen	5.9	10.0	IX	Further information: 2023 Jishishan earthquake	151	982
20	Peru, Arequipa, 11 km (6.8 mi) south southeast of Iray	6.2	93.4	V	Some homes collapsed, 30 others damaged, and landslides blocked roads in the Aplao area.	-	-
21	United States, Alaska offshore, 107 km (66 mi) southeast of Adak	6.1	30.1	IV	-	-	-
22	south of Africa	6.1	10.0	-	-	-	-
27	Indonesia, West Java offshore, 52 km (32 mi) south southwest of Singaparna	5.1	71.6	III	Two buildings collapsed and one home damaged in Tasikmalaya. One home collapsed in Garut and another in Sukabumi.	-	-
28	Russia, Kuril Islands offshore, 113 km (70 mi) southeast of Kuril'sk	6.5	23.8	V	-	-	-
30	Indonesia, Papua, 147 km (91 mi) west southwest of Abepura	6.3	39.1	VI	-	-	-
30	Bosnia and Herzegovina, Zenica-Doboj, 9 km (5.6 mi) south southwest of Željezno Polje	4.7	10.5	VI	Five people injured, one home collapsed and many others severely damaged, landslides and power outages occurred in the Zenica-Ljubetovo area.	-	5
31	Indonesia, West Java, 16 km (9.9 mi) northwest of Sumedang Utara	4.8	11.4	V	Eleven people injured, 81 homes collapsed and 1,441 structures damaged in the Sumedang area.	-	11

== See also ==
- Lists of 21st-century earthquakes
- List of earthquakes 2021-2030
- Lists of earthquakes by year
