= East Sepik earthquake =

East Sepik earthquake may refer to:

- 2023 East Sepik earthquake
- 2024 East Sepik earthquake
