= JPI =

JPI may refer to:

- Pope John Paul I (1912–1978)
- Java Platform Interface
- Jeju Peace Institute, a South Korean think tank
- Jinnah Polytechnic Institute, in Faisalabad, Punjab, Pakistan
- Joint Programming Initiative by the European Commission
- Journal of Political Ideologies
- J.P. Instruments, American avionics manufacturer
- Juvenile Psychopathic Institute, now the Institute for Juvenile Research at the University of Illinois at Chicago
