= Samaritan Aviation =

- Formation: 1999
- Type: Non-Profit
- Legal status: 501(c)(3) nonprofit
- Headquarters: Phoenix, Arizona, United States
- Website: https://samaritanaviation.org/

Samaritan Aviation is a 501 C-3 non-profit Christian organization that serves the population in the East Sepik Province of Papua New Guinea through emergency evacuation flights, the delivery of medical supplies, and continued community outreach and health programs. The non-profit is funded by the Papua New Guinea government and individual donations.

== History ==
Samaritan Aviation was co-founded in 1999 by Mark Palm as a means of providing crucial medical services to the East Sepik Province of Papua New Guinea. To avoid the difficult transport through 30,000 square miles of jungle, Samaritan Aviation introduced the country’s only floatplane in 2010, a retrofitted Cessna 206, which dramatically increased the availability of healthcare to around 500,000 people. In recent years Samaritan Aviation has engaged in multi-city tours, introducing additional Cessna 206 floatplanes and making stops across the United States before shipping the planes to Papua New Guinea.

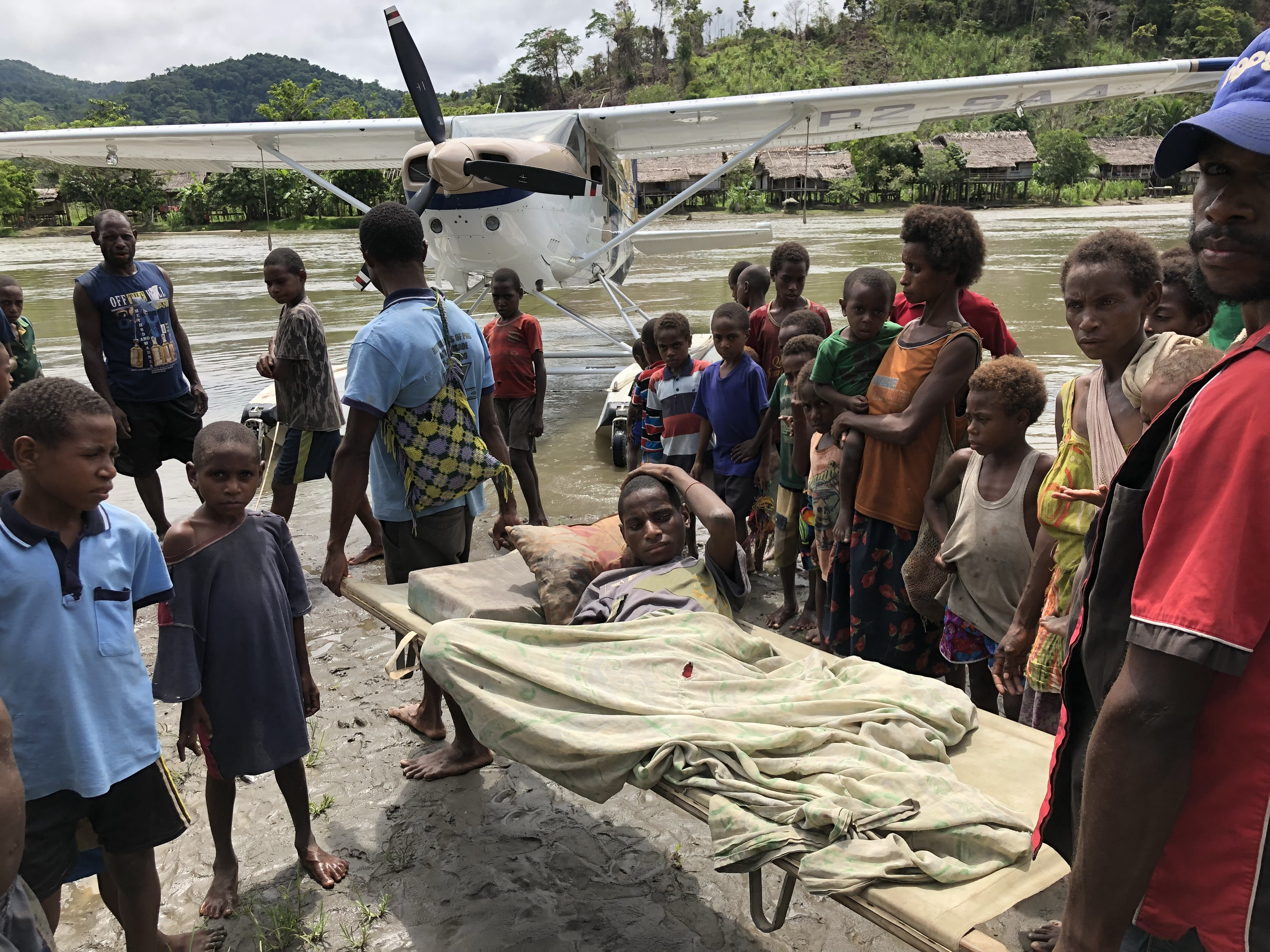
Samaritan Aviation provides emergency transport to hospital for child whose hip had been dislocated for 3 weeks

Over the years, the floatplanes have acted as flying ambulances and transport for vaccines to prevent the spread of measles, whooping cough, and polio. After adding a second plane, two additional pilots (three in total), and a Medical Director over the course of 10 years of operations, Samaritan Aviation began planning for expansion to Papua New Guinea’s Western Province. In 2021, another city tour was organized to raise funds for the planned expansion, including stops in all over the United States, shipping the newest plane to Papua New Guinea in fall of 2022.

== Partnerships ==
=== National Polio Campaign ===
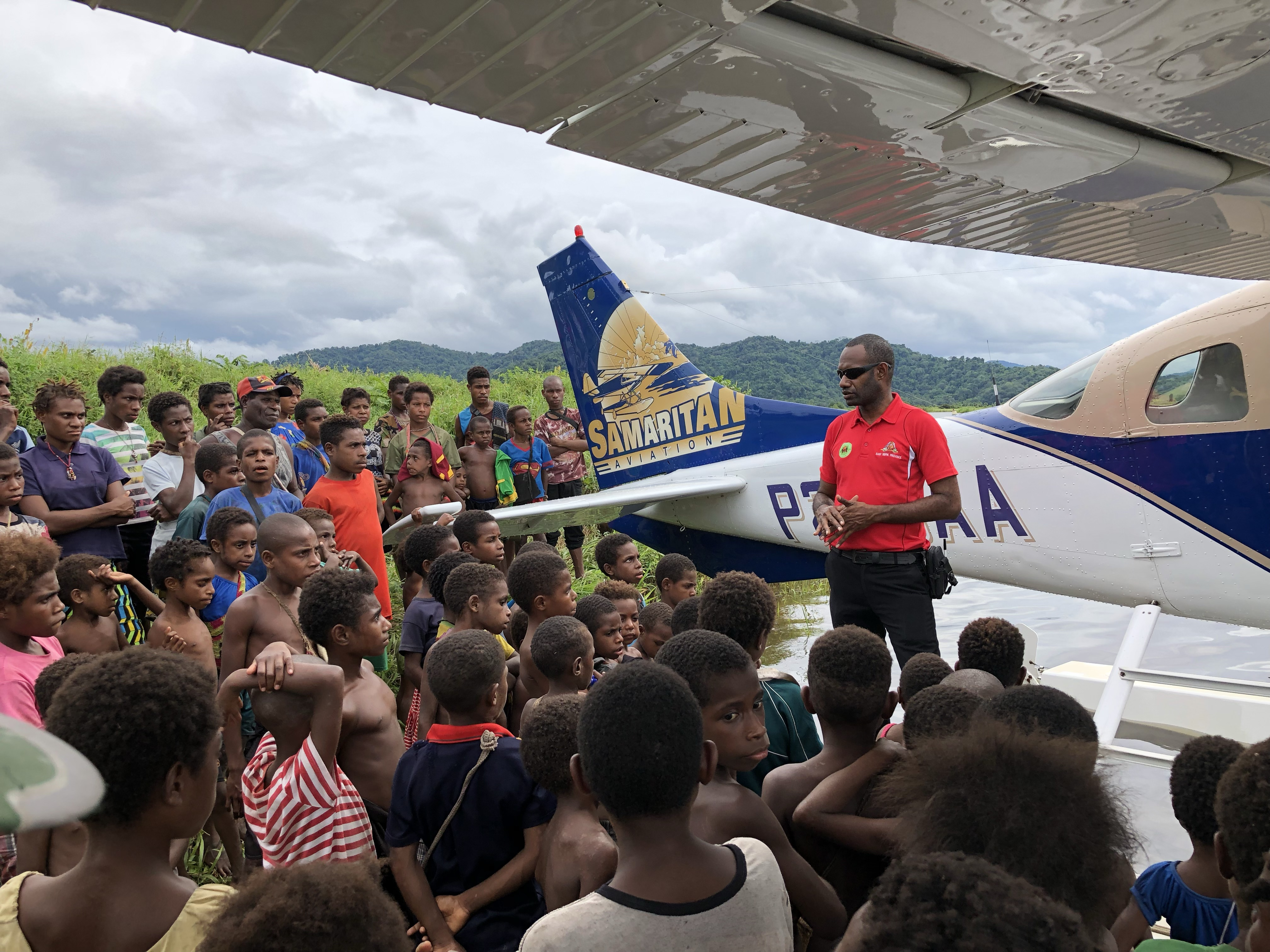
Dr. Preston Karue, the PHA Rural Health Coordinator, educates a rural village about polio during the National Polio Campaign

After a resurgence of polio cases in 2018, Samaritan Aviation was called upon to partner with the ESP Provincial Health Authority, World Health Organization, and Rotary International to aid in the National Polio Vaccine Outreach.

Through the use of their floatplanes, Samaritan Aviation made deliveries of polio vaccines and cold storage equipment to remote villages in the East Sepik Province. Many of these flights also included UN experts and other field workers helping to monitor the coverage rates and impact of the vaccination campaign. This was the first national OPV campaign since 2012.

=== Other Partnerships ===
- The East Sepik Provincial Government
- The West Sepik Provincial Government
- Aerocet
- Ambit Consulting
- AVEO Engineering
- Baylor Scott & White Health
- Catholic Health Services of PNG
- Coal Creek Consulting
- Digicel Foundation
- ECFA
- Heart to Heart International
- International Aid
- Islands Petroleum
- J.P. Instruments
- Kendall Farms
- Ministry of Health PNG
- Northwest Propeller Service Inc
- Oxfam Australia
- Pacific Islands Ministries
- Planning Center
- Project C.U.R.E.
- Save the Children Australia
- South Seas Evangelical Association
- South Seas Tuna
- Stene Aviation
- Western Skyways
