= List of earthquakes in Papua New Guinea =

Earthquakes in Papua New Guinea are due to its location near the geologically active Pacific Ring of Fire. Overall, the population in this region resides in structures that are a mix of vulnerable and earthquake resistant construction. The predominant vulnerable building types are usually metal, timber and unreinforced brick masonry construction.

Date	Region	Mag.	MMI	Deaths	Injuries	Comments	Ref
2024-03-24	East Sepik	6.9 M_{w}	VII	5	12	Severe damage	
2023-04-03	East Sepik	7.0 M_{w}	VII	8	"scores"	Severe damage	
2022-09-11	Morobe	7.6 M_{w}	VIII	21	42	Extensive damage	
2020-07-17	Oro Province	7.0 M_{w}	VII	1		Landslides and a dozen homes collapsed	
2019-05-14	New Ireland	7.6 M_{w}	VII		1	No major damage or deaths reported.	
2019-05-06	Morobe	7.1 M_{w}	VI			Minor damage in Lae	
2018-10-10	New Britain	7.0 M_{w}	VI	1		Moderate damage	
2018-04-07	New Guinea	6.3 M_{w}	VII	4		Aftershock	
2018-03-06	New Guinea	6.7 M_{w}	VII	25		Aftershock	
2018-03-04	New Guinea	6.0 M_{w}	VII	11		Aftershock	
2018-02-26	New Guinea	7.5 M_{w}	IX	160	500+	Heavy damage / Landslides	
2017-01-22	Bougainville Island	7.9 M_{w}	IX	5	17	Moderate damage / Tsunami (local)	
2016-12-17	New Ireland	7.9 M_{w}	VII			Power was knocked out in some areas / tsunami	
2015-03-29	New Britain	7.5 M_{w}	VII			Small tsunami	
2005-06-04	Morobe Province	6.1 M_{w}	VI	1	Several	Many buildings damaged or destroyed in Lae.	
2002-09-09	Sandaun Province	7.6 M_{w}	X	6	70	Tsunami (local)	
2002-04-01	Morobe Province	5.3 M_{w}	IV	36		Deaths from a landslide	
2002-01-10	Sandaun Province	6.7 M_{w}	IX	1		200 homes destroyed at Aitape	
2000-11-16	New Ireland	7.8 M_{w}	VII			Additional damage / doublet	
2000-11-16	New Ireland	8.0 M_{w}	VIII	2		Tsunami (local) / doublet	
1998-07-17	Sandaun Province	7.0 M_{w}	VIII	2,183–2,700	Thousands	Destructive local tsunami (15 m (49 ft))	
1993-10-13	Morobe Province	6.9 M_{w}	IX	60	200	Landslides	
1993-08-20	Hela	6.2 M_{w}	VII		5	Damage in Tari	
1989-03-11	Southern New Ireland	5.8 M_{w}	V	1		Landslide	
1987-02-09	Morobe Province	7.4 M_{s}	VII	3		Landslide	
1985-05-11	New Britain	7.2 M_{w}	VIII	1		Landslides	
1984-03-27	Karkar Island	6.5 M_{w}	VIII		11	Many buildings destroyed	
1971-07-26	PNG / Solomon Islands	8.1 M_{w}	VI			Tsunami (local) / doublet	
1971-07-14	PNG / Solomon Islands	8.0 M_{w}	IX	2	5	Tsunami (local) / doublet	
1970-10-31	North coast	6.9 M_{w}	VIII	5–18	20	3 m (10 ft) tsunami	
1968-10-23	North coast	7.5				Moderate damage	NGDC 1972
1968-02-12	New Ireland	7.8	VIII			Minimal damage	NGDC 1972
1967-08-13	Bismarck Sea	6.4 M_{s}				Severe damage / tsunami	NGDC 1972
1964-11-17	New Britain	7.6 M_{s}	VIII			Minimal damage / tsunami	NGDC 1972
1953-04-23	PNG / Solomon Islands	7.4 M_{w}				Minimal damage / tsunami	NGDC 1972
1941-01-13	Bismarck Sea	7.4 M_{w}		4		Moderate damage / tsunami	NGDC 1972
1939-01-30	Bougainville Island	7.8 M_{s}		5	Many	Moderate damage / tsunami	NGDC 1972
1938-05-12		7.5 M_{s}				Minimal damage / tsunami	NGDC 1972
1937-05-28	New Britain		VIII	507		Volcanic eruption / tsunami at Tavurvur	NGDC 1972
1933-12-12						Minimal damage / tsunami	NGDC 1972
1922-01-19	Bismarck Sea	7.5 M_{s}				Minimal damage / tsunami	NGDC 1972
1920-02-02	New Britain	7.7 M_{s}				Minimal damage / tsunami	NGDC 1972
1919-05-06	PNG / Solomon Islands	7.8 M_{w}				Minimal damage / tsunami	NGDC 1972
1916-01-01	PNG / Solomon Islands	7.9 M_{w}				Minimal damage / tsunami	NGDC 1972
1906-10-02	Bismarck Sea	7.2 M_{w}				Limited damage / tsunami	NGDC 1972
1906-09-14	New Britain	8.0 M_{w}				Minimal damage / tsunami	NGDC 1972
1900-09-10	Bismarck Sea	6.8 M_{s}		Some		Severe damage / tsunami	NGDC 1972
1873	Maclay Coast	8.0 M_{s}		Some		Moderate damage / tsunami	NGDC 1972
1857-04-17	Bismarck Sea	8.0 M_{s}				Minimal damage / tsunami	NGDC 1972
Note: The inclusion criteria for adding events are based on WikiProject Earthquakes' notability guideline that was developed for stand alone articles. The principles described also apply to lists. In summary, only damaging, injurious, or deadly events should be recorded.
