= 2024 East Sepik earthquake =

Earthquake in Papua New Guinea

- Shakemap created by the USGS
- Location within Papua New Guinea
- UTC time: 2024-03-23 20:22:04
- ISC event: 637096014
- USGS-ANSS: ComCat
- Local date: 24 March 2024
- Local time: 06:22
- Magnitude: 6.9 M_{w}
- Depth: 41.5 km (26 mi)
- Epicenter: 4.139°S 143.159°E
- Type: Oblique-slip
- Areas affected: East Sepik Province, Papua New Guinea
- Max. intensity: MMI VII (Very strong)
- Casualties: 5 killed, 12 injured

On 24 March 2024, a M_{w} 6.9 earthquake occurred in the East Sepik Province of Papua New Guinea, killing five people.

== Tectonic setting ==
The island of New Guinea lies within the complex zone of collision between the Australian and Pacific plates. Within this overall setting, the active tectonics of northern Papua New Guinea is dominated by the effects of continuing collision between the Huon–Finisterre island arc terrane with the edge of the Australian continental margin. The overall shortening is focused into two zones of thrust faulting, the Ramu–Markham fault zone, which forms the southwestern boundary of the Huon–Finisterre terrane, and the Highlands Thrust Belt, which lies further southwest and deforms the Australian margin.

In April 2023, a magnitude 7.1 earthquake 21 km (13 mi) southeast of the March 2024 event killed eight people.

== Earthquake ==
The earthquake occurred at 06:22:04 PGT (20:22 UTC), with an epicenter located 4 km (2.5 mi) north of Chambri Lake, or 36 km (22 mi) east-northeast of Ambunti. It also had a hypocenter 41.5 km (25.8 mi) deep. It had a maximum Modified Mercalli intensity of VII (Very Strong), and according to the PAGER service of the United States Geological Survey, shaking of intensities VI-VII (Strong-Very Strong) was felt by an estimated 487,000 residents in East Sepik and Sandaun Provinces. Tremors were also felt in Madang Province and in Goroka, Eastern Highlands Province.

== Impact ==
The earthquake killed five people, injured 12 others and destroyed around 1,000 homes. East Sepik provincial police commander Christopher Tamari warned that the death toll could rise as emergency teams were trying to reach remote areas. Two of the deaths occurred in Angoram and another died in Gawi. Many more unconfirmed fatalities were reported in remote villages near the epicenter. At the time of the earthquake, the province was affected by severe flooding along the Sepik River, which exacerbated damage and casualties from the earthquake. Most houses in the area were made of wood and thatched roofing. Many residents were unable to flee when the earthquake struck, as the inundation reached the chest level in some areas. In the village of Sotmeri, which was experiencing major flooding at the time of the earthquake, all 45 houses collapsed, killing a three-year-old child who drowned after being pinned down by debris when their residence collapsed into floodwaters, while 50 houses were destroyed in the neighbouring village of Korogu. Fishermen out in the water said that waves started building up in rivers when the earthquake struck.

At Kamanibit village in Angoram District, 39 houses collapsed and were submerged beneath floodwaters, while another 11 houses collapsed in the nearby village of Jikinumbu, killing a seven-year-old girl and her mother. Thirty-five houses collapsed in Kawarari. In Yenjimangua, seven houses were destroyed while in Niaurange, eight houses collapsed into floodwaters. A landslide occurred in Yangoru-Saussia District, burying several gardens. In Maprik District, six casualties were recorded from Maprik town and two from Yangoru. A high school in the district was also damaged, while in Wewak, two oxygen cylinders at the Boram General Hospital exploded during the earthquake. A bridge connecting the town to the Papua New Guinea Defence Force garrison at Moem Barracks also collapsed.

Allan Bird, the governor of East Sepik, said that the earthquake had "damaged most parts of the province", with the worst affected areas being Angoram, Wosera-Gawi and Ambunti-Dreikikier Districts, as well as areas along the Sepik River and wetlands. The International Organization for Migration estimated that the earthquake and preceding floods displaced about 10,000 people and affected 400,000 others in East Sepik and Highlands Region, and left more than 1,000 houses destroyed. Eighty-six schools in Ambunti, Wosera-Gawi and Angoram suspended classes indefinitely due to the effects of the earthquake and floods.

== Aftermath ==
A state of emergency was declared in East Sepik Province on 25 March due to the effects of the earthquake as well as the preceding floods. while the provincial government released 200 thousand kina in relief funds, to be augmented later with five million kina. Prime Minister James Marape later announced that the national government would allocate 500 million kina (US$133 million) towards disaster relief. The Second Battalion of the Papua New Guinea Defence Forces' Royal Pacific Islands Regiment based in Moem Barracks was ordered by the defence ministry to mobilize its assets to help in disaster response. A civilian helicopter was deployed to Wewak to assist in relief operations, to be augmented a military helicopter. Governor Bird requested assistance from the US embassy in Port Moresby for the purchase and delivery of 5,000 water filters and buckets. Samaritan Aviation, USAID, the International Organization for Migration and Vodafone also provided assistance to affected communities. The US released a combined total of 3.45 million kina ($920,000) for humanitarian aid for victims of the earthquake and the preceding floods. A donation drive was launched by students and faculty at the Papua New Guinea University of Technology in Lae.

On 29 March, Defence Minister Billy Joseph visited Wewak to look into the disaster response. He also announced the deployment of a C-27 aircraft by the Australian Government to the city carrying humanitarian aid, which arrived on 30 March. On 30 and 31 March, Marape visited East Sepik and other areas affected by the earthquake and the preceding floods. He estimated that the combined total damages from the disasters had cost 221 million kina (US$58.7 million).

== See also ==
- List of earthquakes in 2024
- List of earthquakes in Papua New Guinea
- 2002 Sandaun earthquake
