= Sauzal Bonito =

- Municipality and village
- Location within Neuquén Province Location within Argentina
- Coordinates: 38°36′00″S 69°06′14″W
- Country: Argentina
- Province: Neuquén Province
- Time zone: UTC−3 (ART)

Sauzal Bonito is a village and municipality in Neuquén Province in southwestern Argentina.
