= Xishan Township, Mangshi =

Xishan Township 西山乡
- Township
- Location of the township region in Mangshi

- Location in Yunnan
- Coordinates: 24.303631°N 98.213579°E
- Country: People's Republic of China
- Province: Yunnan
- Prefecture-level city: Dehong Dai and Jingpo Autonomous Prefecture
- County-level city: Mangshi

Area
  - Total: 249 km^{2} (96 sq mi)
- Elevation: 800 m (2,600 ft)

Population (2014)
  - Total: 12,131
  - Density: 48.7/km^{2} (126/sq mi)
- Time zone: UTC+08:00 (China Standard)
- Postal code: 678400
- Area code: 0692

Xishan Township (simplified Chinese: 西山乡; traditional Chinese: 西山鄉; pinyin: Xīshaān Xiāng) is a township in Mangshi, Yunnan, China. As of the 2014 census it had a population of 12,131 and an area of 249 square kilometres (96 sq mi). It is surrounded by Wuchalu Township on the north, Mengyue Township and Wangzishu Township on the west, and Zhefang Town on the east and south. Ninety percent of the local population is Jingpo people.

== Administrative divisions ==
As of December 2015, the township is divided into 6 villages:

- Nongbing (弄丙村)
- Bangjiao (邦角村)
- Mangdong (芒东村)
- Maojiang (毛讲村)
- Benqiang (崩强村)
- Yingpan (营盘村)

== History ==
In 1958, Xishan Commune (西山公社) was set up.

It was renamed "Xiangyang Commune" (向阳公社) in 1969 and two years later it reverted to its former name of "Xishan Commune".

In 1984 its name was changed to "Xishan District".

It was upgraded to a township in 1988.

== Geography ==
The highest elevation is 1750 meters and the lowest is 780 meters.

The Longchuan River (龙川江) flows through the township.

== Education ==
- Xishan Middle School

== Economy ==
The local economy is primarily based upon agriculture. Cash crops are mainly rice, wheat, sugarcane and tea.

== Transport ==
The National Highway G56 passes across the township.

The Provincial Highway S320 runs north to south through the township.
