= Girovce =

- Municipality
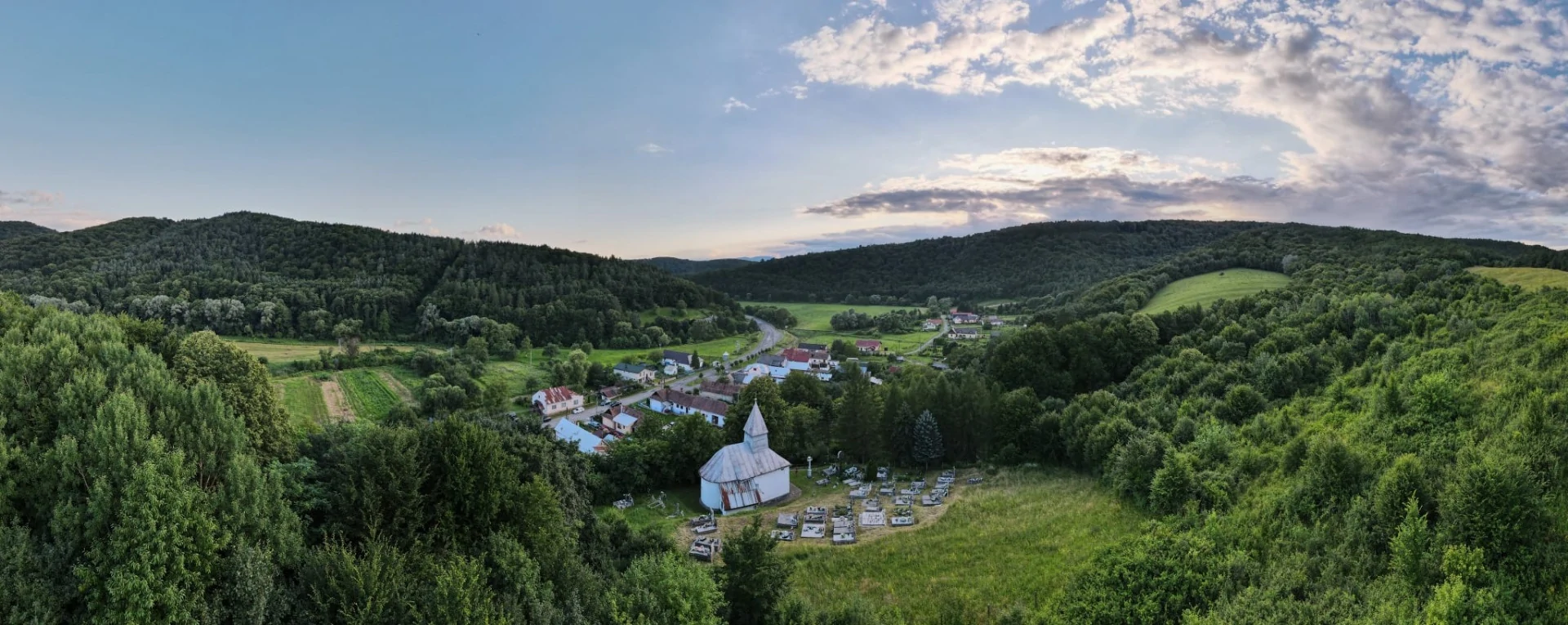

- Flag

- Location of Girovce in the Prešov Region Location of Girovce in Slovakia
- Coordinates: 49.02°N 21.77°E
- Country: Slovakia
- Region: Prešov Region
- District: Vranov nad Topľou District
- First mentioned: 1408

Area
  - Total: 2.73 km^{2} (1.05 sq mi)
- Elevation: 143 m (469 ft)

Population (2025)
  - Total: 51
- Time zone: UTC+1 (CET)
  - Summer (DST): UTC+2 (CEST)
- Postal code: 940 6
- Area code: +421 57
- Vehicle registration plate (until 2022): VT
- Website: girovce.webnode.sk

Girovce (Hungarian: Gerlefalva, until 1899: Girócz) is a village and municipality in Vranov nad Topľou District in the Prešov Region of eastern Slovakia.

== History ==
In historical records the village was first mentioned in 1408.

== Geography ==
The municipality lies at an altitude of 143 metres (469 ft) and covers an area of 2.73 km^{2} (1.05 sq mi) (2025).

== Population ==
Population statistic (10 years)
Year	1995	2005	2015	2025
Count	84	71	59	51
Difference		−15.47%	−16.90%	−13.55%

Population statistic
Year	2024	2025
Count	51	51
Difference		+0%

It has a population of 51 people (31 December 2025).

=== Ethnicity ===
Census 2021 (1+ %)
Ethnicity	Number	Fraction
Slovak	55	100%
Czech	2	3.63%
Rusyn	1	1.81%
Total	55	

In year 2021 was 55 people by ethnicity 55 as Slovak, 2 as Czech and 1 as Rusyn.

Note on population: The difference values of population numbers in the table "Population statistic" and in the sections "Ethnicity" & "Religion" is caused by the use of various statistical methods.

=== Religion ===
Census 2021 (1+ %)
Religion	Number	Fraction
Roman Catholic Church	42	76.36%
Greek Catholic Church	9	16.36%
None	4	7.27%
Total	55	

In year 2021 was 55 people by religion 42 from Roman Catholic Church, 9 from Greek Catholic Church and 4 from None.

== See also ==
- List of municipalities and towns in Slovakia

== Genealogical resources ==
The records for genealogical research are available at the state archive "Statny Archiv in Presov, Slovakia"

- Roman Catholic church records (births/marriages/deaths): 1795-1895 (parish B)
- Greek Catholic church records (births/marriages/deaths): 1802-1895 (parish B)
