= List of aftershocks of the 2023 Turkey–Syria earthquake =

Map of mainshock and aftershocks – Mw 4.0 or greater

This article provides a list of aftershocks of intensity VI (Strong) or higher of the 2023 Turkey–Syria earthquakes. The area has experienced more than 40 such aftershocks.

== Key ==
Magnitude 7.0 or greater
Magnitude 6.0–6.9
Magnitude 5.4–5.9
Magnitude 5.0–5.3

== Mainshock ==
Date	Time (UTC)	M	MMI	Depth	Ref.	ISC event
6 February	01:17	7.8	XII	10.0 km (6.2 mi)		625613033

== Aftershocks ==
Date	Time (UTC)	M	MMI	Depth	Ref.	ISC event
6 February	01:26	5.7	VIII	10.0 km (6.2 mi)		625638553
6 February	01:28	6.7	VIII	9.8 km (6.1 mi)		625613034
6 February	01:36	5.6	VII	10.0 km (6.2 mi)		625613044
6 February	02:03	5.3	VI	16.9 km (10.5 mi)		625613041
6 February	04:18	5.0	VI	16.4 km (10.2 mi)		625613243
6 February	10:24	7.7	X	7.4 km (4.6 mi)		625614289
6 February	10:26	6.0	VII	10.0 km (6.2 mi)		625616359
6 February	10:35	5.8	VII	10.0 km (6.2 mi)		625614275
6 February	10:51	5.7	VII	10.0 km (6.2 mi)		625614294
6 February	12:02	6.0	VIII	8.5 km (5.3 mi)		625614314
6 February	13:07	5.0	VII	16.9 km (10.5 mi)		625615512
6 February	13:39	5.3	VII	10.0 km (6.2 mi)		625615535
6 February	13:44	5.0	VI	16.9 km (10.5 mi)		625615541
6 February	15:33	5.4	VII	7.4 km (4.6 mi)		625615567
6 February	16:43	5.0	VI	10.0 km (6.2 mi)		625615551
6 February	18:03	5.2	VI	10.0 km (6.2 mi)		625615571
7 February	03:13	5.5	VII	10.0 km (6.2 mi)		625616469
7 February	07:11	5.4	VI	9.1 km (5.7 mi)		625616472
7 February	10:18	5.3	VI	13.0 km (8.1 mi)		625616599
8 February	11:11	5.4	VI	9.6 km (6.0 mi)		625618686
8 February	14:20	5.1	VI	5.4 km (3.4 mi)		625638625
20 February	17:04	6.3	IX	16.0 km (9.9 mi)		625728181
20 February	17:07	5.5	VI	10.0 km (6.2 mi)		626285351
25 February	10:27	5.2	VII	11.8 km (7.3 mi)		625738681
27 February	09:04	5.2	VII	10 km (6.2 mi)		625743647
25 July	05:44	5.5	VI	13.1 km (8.1 mi)		626536199
10 August	17:48	5.2	VI	10.0 km (6.2 mi)		643493655

== Notable aftershocks ==
- The magnitude 7.5 aftershock on 6 February destroyed over 2,000 buildings in Elbistan and 335 others in Afşin. Some adobe houses also collapsed in Sivas Province, and an apartment building in Elazığ collapsed. It also caused further panic as far as Ordu Province. Some buildings also received minor damage in Damascus, Syria. In Bnei Brak, Israel, the earthquake also caused minor damage to Champion Motors Tower.
- The magnitude 6.3 aftershock on 20 February left eight people dead, and 562 injured. Some buildings collapsed in Samandağ and Antakya, Turkey. Five people died from panic-related causes, and several buildings were destroyed in Aleppo and Tartus, Syria. In Akkar Governorate, Lebanon, rockfalls occurred.
- The magnitude 5.2 aftershock on 27 February caused about 30 buildings to collapse. Two people died, and 140 others were injured.
- The magnitude 5.5 aftershock on 25 July caused 63 injuries in Adana and Osmaniye Provinces. One house was destroyed and 18 others were damaged in Kozan and another was damaged by rockfalls in Sumbas.
- The magnitude 5.3 aftershock on 10 August caused 23 injuries; one in Adıyaman and the rest in Malatya. One building collapsed, and two others were heavily damaged.
