= Ouinné River =

River of New Caledonia

Coordinates: 22.009°S 166.608°E

The Ouinné River is a river of New Caledonia. It has a catchment area of 146 square kilometres.

== See also ==
- List of rivers of New Caledonia
