= Ďapalovce =

- Municipality
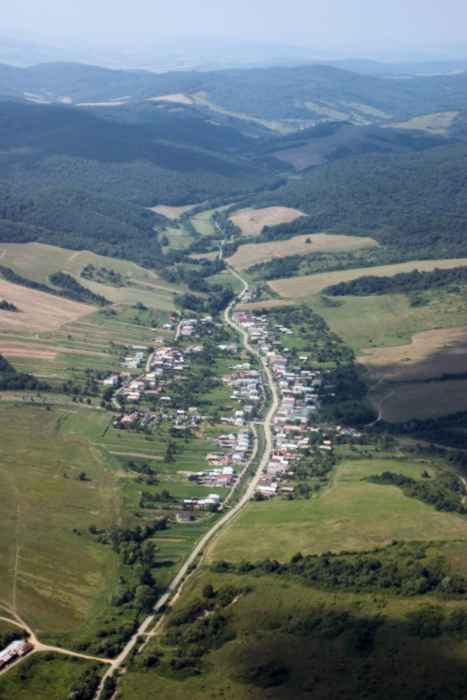

- Flag

- Location of Ďapalovce in the Prešov Region Location of Ďapalovce in Slovakia
- Coordinates: 49.07°N 21.75°E
- Country: Slovakia
- Region: Prešov Region
- District: Vranov nad Topľou District
- First mentioned: 1408

Area
  - Total: 14.38 km^{2} (5.55 sq mi)
- Elevation: 193 m (633 ft)

Population (2025)
  - Total: 400
- Time zone: UTC+1 (CET)
  - Summer (DST): UTC+2 (CEST)
- Postal code: 910 5
- Area code: +421 57
- Vehicle registration plate (until 2022): VT
- Website: www.obecdapalovce.sk

Ďapalovce (Hungarian: Gyapár, formerly: Gyapalócz) is a village and municipality in Vranov nad Topľou District in the Prešov Region of eastern Slovakia.

== History ==
In historical records the village was first mentioned in 1408.

== Geography ==
The municipality lies at an altitude of 193 metres (633 ft) and covers an area of 14.38 km^{2} (5.55 sq mi) (2025).

== Population ==
Population statistic (10 years)
Year	1995	2005	2015	2025
Count	506	487	454	400
Difference		−3.75%	−6.77%	−11.89%

Population statistic
Year	2024	2025
Count	415	400
Difference		−3.61%

It has a population of 400 people (31 December 2025).

According to the 2011 census, the municipality had 473 inhabitants. 472 of inhabitants were Slovaks and 1 Czech.

== See also ==
- List of municipalities and towns in Slovakia

== Genealogical resources ==
The records for genealogical research are available at the state archive "Statny Archiv in Presov, Slovakia"

- Roman Catholic church records (births/marriages/deaths): 1795-1895 (parish B)
- Greek Catholic church records (births/marriages/deaths): 1802-1895 (parish B)
