= Puerto Escondido, Córdoba =

Coordinates: 8°57′N 76°15′W

- Municipality and town
- Flag Coat of arms

- Location of the municipality and town of Puerto Escondido, Córdoba in the Córdoba Department of Colombia.
- Country: Colombia
- Department: Córdoba Department

Population (Census 2018)
  - Total: 19,474
- Time zone: UTC-5 (Colombia Standard Time)

Puerto Escondido is a town and municipality located in the Córdoba Department, northern Colombia.

According to 2018 estimates, the population of Puerto Escondido was 19,474.

== History ==
In 1854 the Casimiro brothers, Máximo, José Blas and Nicomedes Díaz, arrived from Barú and settled in the place that today is known as Puerto Escondido Viejo. Another family named Barrios, also from the island of Barú, near Cartagena, attracted by the stories that the sailors kept about the fertility of these lands and the goodness of their inhabitants, came to settle in these places.

As the population increased, they decided to move their ranches to the site that today is called the Simón Bolívar neighbourhood, because it is near a lagoon that supplies water to the community. Puerto Escondido, the new one, became the main hamlet on this coast, for which the Assembly of the Department of Bolívar erected it as a district of the municipality of Lorica by Ordinance No. 42 of April 27, 1923.

By Ordinance No. 53 of April 24, 1928, the Bolívar Assembly clarified that the town of Puerto Escondido comprised the hamlets or aggregations of Yuca, Mangle, Alta Clara, Tierra Adentro, Agua Viva, Palmar, Morindó and Puerto Escondido.

== Climate ==
Climate data for Puerto Escondido (Cristo Rey), elevation 15 m (49 ft), (1981–2010)
| Month | Jan | Feb | Mar | Apr | May | Jun | Jul | Aug | Sep | Oct | Nov | Dec | Year |
|---|---|---|---|---|---|---|---|---|---|---|---|---|---|
| Mean daily maximum °C (°F) | 31.0 (87.8) | 30.9 (87.6) | 31.0 (87.8) | 31.0 (87.8) | 30.9 (87.6) | 31.0 (87.8) | 31.1 (88.0) | 31.0 (87.8) | 30.6 (87.1) | 30.6 (87.1) | 30.8 (87.4) | 31.0 (87.8) | 30.9 (87.6) |
| Daily mean °C (°F) | 27.7 (81.9) | 27.9 (82.2) | 28.1 (82.6) | 28.2 (82.8) | 27.9 (82.2) | 27.8 (82.0) | 27.8 (82.0) | 27.6 (81.7) | 27.3 (81.1) | 27.3 (81.1) | 27.4 (81.3) | 27.6 (81.7) | 27.7 (81.9) |
| Mean daily minimum °C (°F) | 24.3 (75.7) | 25.1 (77.2) | 25.4 (77.7) | 25.5 (77.9) | 24.9 (76.8) | 24.2 (75.6) | 24.0 (75.2) | 24.0 (75.2) | 23.8 (74.8) | 23.8 (74.8) | 23.8 (74.8) | 23.9 (75.0) | 24.4 (75.9) |
| Average precipitation mm (inches) | 12.3 (0.48) | 7.7 (0.30) | 10.0 (0.39) | 91.3 (3.59) | 218.1 (8.59) | 162.7 (6.41) | 176.6 (6.95) | 192.6 (7.58) | 207.8 (8.18) | 209.3 (8.24) | 151.9 (5.98) | 42.3 (1.67) | 1,467.6 (57.78) |
| Average precipitation days | 3 | 1 | 2 | 7 | 14 | 14 | 14 | 16 | 15 | 14 | 12 | 4 | 115 |
| Average relative humidity (%) | 83 | 81 | 80 | 82 | 85 | 86 | 85 | 86 | 86 | 86 | 86 | 85 | 84 |
Source: Instituto de Hidrologia Meteorologia y Estudios Ambientales
