= 2023 Papua New Guinea earthquake =

- Location within Papua New Guinea
- UTC time: 2023-04-02 18:04:10
- ISC event: 625938325
- USGS-ANSS: ComCat
- Local date: 3 April 2023
- Local time: 04:04 (UTC+10:00)
- Magnitude: 7.1 M_{w}
- Depth: 62.6 km (39 mi)
- Epicenter: 4.292°S 143.155°E
- Type: Strike-slip
- Areas affected: northern Papua New Guinea
- Total damage: Severe
- Max. intensity: MMI VII (Very strong)
- Landslides: Yes
- Casualties: 8 dead, "scores" injured

A magnitude 7.1 earthquake struck 38.3 km (23.8 mi) east-southeast of Ambunti in East Sepik Province, Papua New Guinea on 3 April 2023.

== Tectonic setting ==
The island of New Guinea lies within the complex zone of collision between the Australian and Pacific plates. Within this overall setting, the active tectonics of northern Papua New Guinea is dominated by the effects of continuing collision between the Huon–Finisterre island arc terrane with the edge of the Australian continental margin. The overall shortening is focused into two zones of thrust faulting, the Ramu–Markham fault zone, which forms the southwestern boundary of the Huon–Finisterre terrane, and the Highlands Thrust Belt, which lies further southwest and deforms the Australian margin. The hanging wall of the Ramu–Markham thrust system is broken up by multiple strike-slip faults. The orientation of these faults, parallel to the direction of thrusting, suggests that they accommodate distortion of the Huon–Finisterre block. Most of the seismicity in northern Papua New Guinea is associated with the Ramu–Markham fault system, with a smaller number of earthquakes occurring on the strike-slip faults and on the Highlands Thrust Belt.

== Earthquake ==
The earthquake had a focal mechanism corresponding to a dip-slip fault. The United States Geological Survey reported that the earthquake's magnitude was M_{ww}7.0, while GEOSCOPE reported the earthquake as M_{w}7.2 at a depth of 39 km (24 mi), while the GCMT reported the event as M_{w}7.1. According to PAGER, the earthquake caused damaging shaking of intensities V-VII (Moderate-Very Strong) in the towns of Ambunti, Angoram, Wewak, Aitape, Porgera and Wabag, combining to a total population of about 1.12 million residents. Mild tremors of the earthquake were also felt in neighboring Indonesia, with an intensity of III (Weak) felt in Keerom and Jayapura, and II-III (Weak) in Nabire and Merauke.

== Damage and casualties ==
All six districts of East Sepik Province were affected. Over 874 homes were damaged or destroyed in the earthquake, including 52 in Ambunti, more than 50 in Wewak and 542 in Angoram, and damage occurred in 23 villages around the epicenter. There were at least eight deaths and "scores" of injuries. The deaths included four in Angoram, one in Yangoru, two in Wosera-Gawi District and another death in Wewak. In the village of Korogu, three houses collapsed and many were injured. Landslides were also reported in the affected areas, and deep fissures were reported in Chambri Lake, where the epicenter was located. At least two people were injured and 178 houses were destroyed in Karawari, southeast of the epicenter. Three houses were destroyed in Karambit. Minor damage to buildings were reported in the neighboring provinces of Enga and Western Highlands.

== See also ==
- List of earthquakes in Papua New Guinea
- List of earthquakes in 2023
- 2024 East Sepik earthquake
