= Ljubetovo =

- Village
- Location within Bosnia and Herzegovina
- Coordinates: 44.2945098°N 17.8805971°E
- Country: Bosnia and Herzegovina
- Entity: Federation of Bosnia and Herzegovina
- Canton: Zenica-Doboj
- Municipality: Zenica

Area
  - Total: 0.71 sq mi (1.84 km^{2})

Population (2013)
  - Total: 184
  - Density: 259/sq mi (100/km^{2})
- Time zone: UTC+1 (CET)
  - Summer (DST): UTC+2 (CEST)

Ljubetovo is a village in the City of Zenica, Bosnia and Herzegovina.

== Demographics ==
According to the 2013 census, its population was 184, all Bosniaks.
