= J.P. Instruments =

- Founded: 1986
- Founder: Joseph Polizzotto
- Headquarters: Costa Mesa, California, United States
- Key people: Larry Elbert
- Website: www.jpinstruments.com

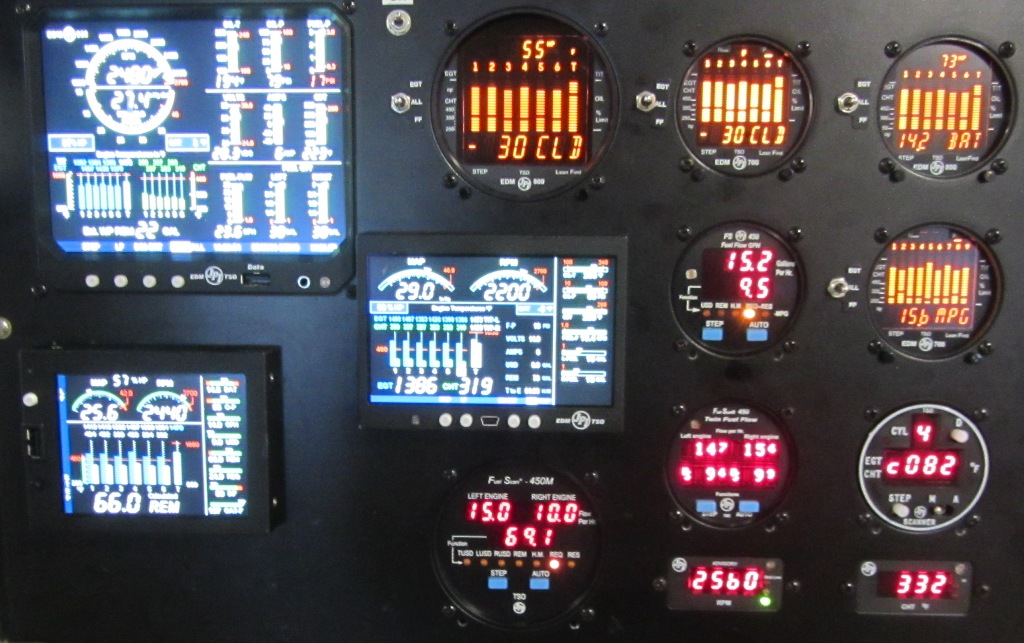
A display of JPI avionics

J.P. Instruments is an American aircraft avionics manufacturer.

The company was founded in Santa Ana, California marketing its first product, "The Scanner", to monitor engine temperatures in piston engine aircraft. In 1992, JPI came out with the EDM-500 which electronically monitors and stores engine parameters.
