= History of Afghanistan (1992–present) =

Fall of Najibullah to present

This article on the history of Afghanistan covers the period from the fall of the Najibullah government in 1992 to the end of the international military presence in Afghanistan.

== Background ==
After the Soviet Union withdrew completely from Afghanistan in February 1989, fighting between the communist backed government and mujahideen continued. With material help from the Soviets, Mohammad Najibullah's government survived, but after the collapse of the Soviet Union in 1991, it was overthrown on April 28, 1992. The forces of Abdul Rashid Dostum surrendered to Ahmed Shah Massoud and Kabul was left without defenses and soon fell to Massoud. At the time, Doustum had 1,500 militia in Kabul airport.

== Islamic State of Afghanistan (1992-1996) ==
Seeking to resolve these differences, the leaders of the Peshawar-based mujahideen groups established an interim Jamiat-e Islami in mid-April to assume power in Kabul. Moderate leader Prof. Sibghatullah Mojadeddi was to chair the council for 2 months, after which a 10-member leadership council composed of mujahideen leaders and presided over by the head of the Jamiat-i-Islami, Prof. Burhanuddin Rabbani, was to be set up for 4 months. During this 6-month period, a Loya Jirga, or grand council of Afghan elders and notables, would convene and designate an interim administration which would hold power up to a year, pending elections.

But in May 1992, Rabbani prematurely formed the leadership council, undermining Mojaddedi's fragile authority. On June 28, 1992, Mojaddedi surrendered power to the Leadership Council, which then elected Rabbani as President. Nonetheless, heavy fighting broke out in August 1992 in Kabul between forces loyal to President Rabbani and rival factions, particularly those who supported Gulbuddin Hekmatyar's Hezb-i-Islami Gulbuddin. After Rabbani extended his tenure in December 1992, fighting in the capital flared up in January and February 1993. The Islamabad Accord, signed in March 1993, which appointed Hekmatyar as Prime Minister, failed to have a lasting effect. A follow-up agreement, the Jalalabad Accord, called for the militias to be disarmed but was never fully implemented. Through 1993, Hekmatyar's Hezb-i-Islami forces, allied with the Shi'a Hezb-i-Wahdat militia, clashed intermittently with Rabbani and Massoud's Jamiat forces. Cooperating with Jamiat were militants of Sayyaf's Ittehad-i-Islami and, periodically, troops loyal to ethnic Uzbek strongman Abdul Rashid Dostam. On January 1, 1994, Dostam switched sides, precipitating large scale fighting in Kabul and in northern provinces, which caused thousands of civilian casualties in Kabul and elsewhere and created a new wave of displaced persons and refugees. The country sank even further into anomie, forces loyal to Rabbani and Masud, both ethnic Tajiks, controlled Kabul and much of the northeast, while local warlords exerted power over the rest of the country.

== Islamic Emirate and the Taliban (1996-2001) ==
In reaction to the warlordism prevalent in the country, and the lack of Pashtun representation in the Kabul government, the Taliban movement arose. Many Taliban had been educated in madrasas in Pakistan and were largely from rural Pashtun backgrounds. This group was made up of mostly Pashtuns that dedicated itself to removing the warlords, providing law and order, and imposing strict Islamic Sharia law on the country. In 1994 it developed enough strength to capture the city of Kandahar from a local warlord and proceeded to expand its control throughout Afghanistan, controlling Herat in September 1995, then Kabul in September 1996, and declaring the Islamic Emirate of Afghanistan. By this time Afghanistan was in its 17th year of war. It had the highest infant, child and maternal mortality rates in Asia. An estimated 10 million landmines covered its terrain. Two million refugees were in camps.

Pakistan recognized the Taliban as the legitimate rulers of Afghanistan in 1997. By the end of 2000, the Taliban controlled about 95% of the country, limiting the opposition to a small corner in the northeast Panjshir Valley. Efforts by the UN, prominent Afghans living outside the country, and other interested countries to bring about a peaceful solution to the continuing conflict came to nothing, largely because of intransigence on the part of the Taliban.

The Taliban sought to impose an extreme interpretation of Islam—based in part upon rural Pashtun tradition—upon the entire country and committed human rights violations, particularly directed against women and girls, in the process. Women were restricted from working outside the home or pursuing an education, were not to leave their homes without an accompanying male relative, and required to wear a traditional burqa.The Taliban repressed minority populations, particularly the Shia, as a retaliation in which approximately 2,500 Taliban soldiers were massacred by Abdul Malik and his Shia followers; attacked the Iranian embassy, killing eight diplomats and a television reporter, claiming them as spies.

In 2001, as part of a drive against relics of Afghanistan's pre-Islamic past, the Taliban destroyed two large statues of Buddha outside of the city of Bamiyan and announced destruction of all pre-Islamic statues in Afghanistan, including the remaining holdings of the Kabul Museum.In addition to the continuing civil strife, the country suffered from widespread poverty, drought, a devastated infrastructure, and ubiquitous use of landmines. These conditions led to about a million Afghans facing starvation. The February and May 1998 earthquakes killed thousands of Afghans in the northeast Badakhshan Province.

== International Intervention and Interim Government (2001-2004) ==
From the mid-1990s the Taliban provided sanctuary to Osama bin Laden, a Saudi national who had fought with them against the Soviets, and provided a base for his and other terrorist organizations. The United Nations Security Council repeatedly sanctioned the Taliban for these activities. Bin Laden provided both financial and political support to the Taliban, as did Pakistan and Saudi Arabia, until American pressure forced them to drop their public support for the Taliban after September 11, 2001. Bin Laden and his al Qaeda group were charged with the bombing of the United States embassies in Nairobi and Dar Es Salaam in 1998, and in August 1998 the United States launched a cruise missile attack against bin Laden's terrorist camp in Afghanistan. Bin Laden and al Qaeda are believed responsible for the September 11, 2001 attacks in the United States, among other crimes.

By September 2001 the remaining opposition to the Taliban had been confined to the Panjshir Valley and a small region in the northeast. The opposition by this time had formed the Afghan Northern Alliance but controlled less than 5% of the country. Nevertheless, they held onto Afghanistan's diplomatic representation in the United Nations as only three countries in the world continued to recognize the Taliban government. On September 9, agents working on behalf of the Taliban and believed to be associated with bin Laden's al Qaeda group assassinated Northern Alliance Defense Minister and chief military commander Ahmed Shah Massoud, a hero of the Afghan resistance against the Soviets and the Taliban's principal military opponent. Following the Taliban's repeated refusal to expel bin Laden and his group and end its support for international terrorism, the United States and its partners launched an invasion of Afghanistan on October 7, 2001.

A period of bombing followed, which for about a month appeared to be having little effect. The US required the assistance of countries around Afghanistan to provide a route for the attack, but criticism increased as various mosques, aid agencies, hospitals, and other civilian buildings were damaged by US bombs. However, the Northern Alliance, fighting against a Taliban weakened by US bombing and massive defections, captured Mazari Sharif on November 9. It rapidly gained control of most of northern Afghanistan and took control of Kabul on November 13 after the Taliban unexpectedly fled the city. The Taliban were restricted to a smaller and smaller region, with Kunduz, the last Taliban-held city in the north, captured on November 26. Most of the Taliban fled to Pakistan. The war continued in the south of the country, where the Taliban retreated to Kandahar. After Kandahar fell in December, remnants of the Taliban and al-Qaeda continued to mount resistance.

Following the Ioya Jirga in June 2002, a transitional government was put in place to govern Afghanistan, overseen by the United Nations and the Bush administration of the United States. The assembly voted Hamid Karzai as President, a position he was reelected to in successor governments until 2014.

== Islamic Republic of Afghanistan (2004-2021) ==
The 2003 Ioya Jirga saw an assembly vote and approve the foundations of a new republic and constitution for Afghanistan. The Islamic Republic saw NATO troops being maintained in the country while fighting the Taliban insurgency. The first election for president was held in 2004, Hamid Karzai was declared the winner and became President of the Islamic Republic. Karzai won reelection in 2009 and left office in 2014. He was succeeded by Ashraf Ghani who won the 2014 presidential election and reelected in 2019.

== Reinstatement of the Islamic Emirate (2021-present) ==
NATO troops began to slowly withdraw international troops from Afghanistan as the war continued. Concurrently in 2021, the Taliban insurgency quickly began to see success, capturing 33 of the 34 provincial capitals of Afghanistan in the span of three months. On August 15, 2021, the Taliban captured Kabul with President Ghani fleeing the country. Anti Taliban-forces along with the remnants of the Islamic Republic formed the National Resistance Front of Afghanistan, launching an insurgency against the Taliban from the Panjshir Valley.
