= Geology of Serbia =

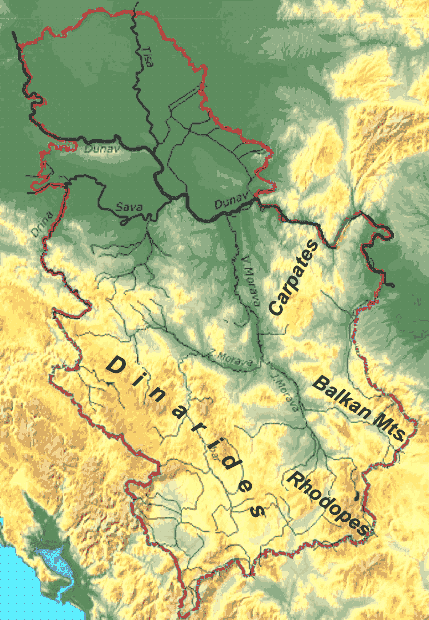
Mountain ranges of Serbia

The regional geology of Serbia describes the geologic structure and history inside the borders of Serbia.

Serbia is in recent geologic time a part of the Eurasian Plate, but the bedrock lithologies are witness to a diverse geologic history. In a tectonic sense, Serbia is part of an orogenic system that is composed of the Alpine, Carpathian, and Dinaride orogenic belts. Its territory can be divided into five geotectonic units of differing genesis:

- Pannonian Plain, occupying the northern part of the country (Vojvodina province)
- Dinaric Alps occupy western part of Central Serbia, stretching in general northwest-southeast direction
- Vardar Zone is a belt east of the Dinaric alps, continuing into central North Macedonia. It consists of three parts: Srem, Jadar and Kopaonik blocks, separated by ophiolitics fractures.
- Serbian-Macedonian Massif is a belt stretching in north-south direction along the Great and South Morava valleys, into western North Macedonia and northern Greece (north of Chalkidiki peninsula).
- Carpatho-Balkan Arc covers Eastern Serbia, in the shape of an arc. Its northern part, Serbian Carpathians is an extension of Carpathian Range, and it joins the western parts of Balkan Mountains, whose main massif is in Bulgaria.

== Tectonic units ==
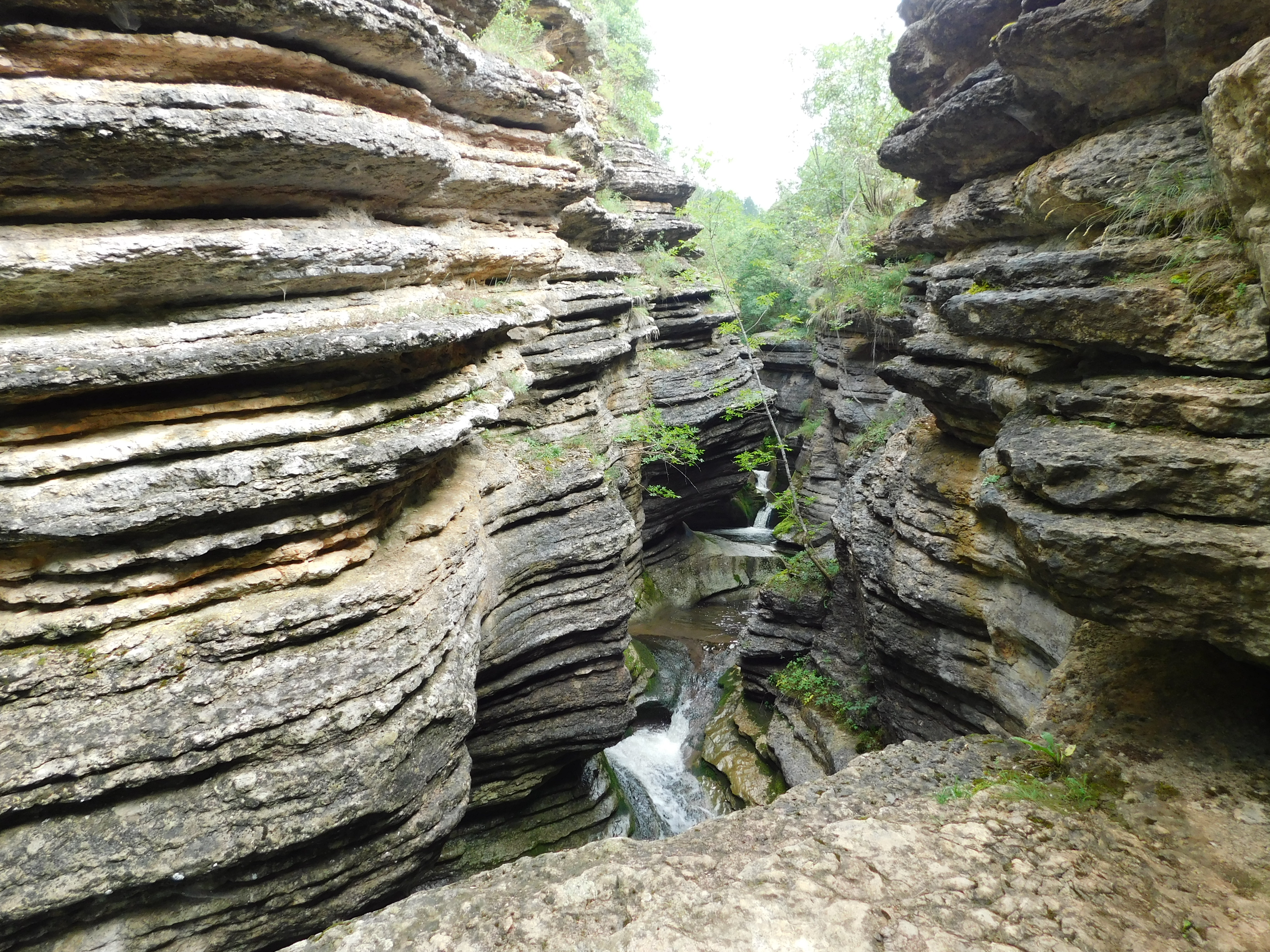
Layers of sedimentary rock in Rosomače Canyon

=== Sava Zone ===
The Sava Zone (named after the river Sava) is an oceanic suture that strikes roughly NNW to SSE through Serbia and is mostly covered in the north by the sediments of the Pannonian Basin. Outcrops can be found in the Fruška Gora (Fruška mountains). Here the unit is composed of blueschists and ophiolites. In the south outcrops of the Sava Zone occur in the Balkan and Rhodope Mountains. This includes the Senonian Flysch and the rocks cropping out in the Jastrebac Window.

=== Jadar-Kopaonik thrust sheet ===
The Jadar-Kopaonik Thrust Sheet is a NW-SE striking unit in the southern footwall of the Sava Zone and the northern hangingwall of the Drina-Ivanjica Thrust Sheet. Most of the outcrops are ophiolites from the Western Vardar ocean, but there are some windows into the underlying basement. The Jadar unit in western Serbia (Jadar Region) is the largest window into the underlying Adriatic units of the Jadar-Kopaonik Thrust Sheet. Two smaller windows crop out farther to the south. The Studenica unit lies in the west and the Kopaonik unit in the east of the thrust sheet.

=== Supragetic ===
The Supragetic nappes form a N-S striking belt in eastern Serbia, where they crop out in the Balkan Mountains (Stara Planina). They are part of the paleogeographic realm of Dacia. The Supragetic is subdivided into the Ranovac and Vlasina unit.

=== Drina-Ivanjica thrust sheet ===
The Drina-Ivanjica thrust sheet forms a NNW to SSE striking thrust sheet through southwestern Serbia. It is composed of a Paleozoic basement and Mesozoic cover. On top of this lies the obducted Zlatibor ophiolite (Zlatibor Mountains), a remnant of the Western Vardar ocean.

== Seismic activity ==
Serbia is prone to moderate to strong seismic activity, especially in the central belts of Vardar Zone and Serbian Massif. Major earthquakes in the 20th century ranged between 5.0 from 6.0 (Lazarevac 1922) Richter scale. The last major earthquake at 5.4 occurred near Kraljevo on 3 November 2010.

List of major earthquakes in the 20th and 21st centuries:

- 1893. Svilajnac – 5,7 Richter scale
- 1921. Vitina – 5,7
- 1922. Lazarevac – 5,9
- 1927. Rudnik – 5,7
- 1980. Kopaonik – 5,7
- 1983. Kopaonik – 5,3
- 1998. Mionica – 5,7
- 2010. Kraljevo – 5,4

== Modern history ==
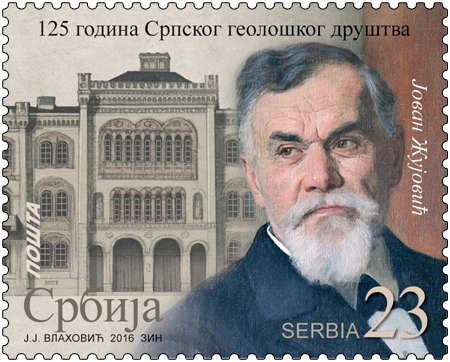
A 2016 stamp dedicated to the 125th anniversary of the Serbian Geologic Society, featuring its founder, Jovan Žujović.

The Serbian Geologic Society was established by a group of professors and students in Belgrade on 10 February 1891 under the leadership of Jovan Žujović. The geologic survey was founded 29 December 1930.

== Economic geology ==
The economic geology of Serbia was reviewed by Melcher and Reichl in 2017.

Serbia is the 18th largest producer of coal (7th in Europe) extracted from large deposits in Kolubara and Kostolac basins; it is also world's 23rd largest (3rd in Europe) producer of copper which is extracted near Majdanpek by Zijin Bor Copper, a large copper mining company with significant gold extraction. In 2018, it was acquired by the Chinese Zijin Mining, which in April 2021 was ordered by the government to cease activity because of "non-compliance with environmental standards".

The iron ore deposits of Serbia are insignificant. Iron and copper deposits were found at Suva Ruda and Suvo Rudište.

The largest laterite nickel deposit in Europe is at Mokra Gora, with an estimated 1,000 million tons of ore.

The Jadar deposit contains high-grade mineralisation of boron and lithium in a mineral named Jadarite and Rio Tinto has invested $200M to test if it "has the potential to produce both battery-grade lithium carbonate and boric acid." Reports were made in March 2021 that the Jadar mine would begin production in 2026.

== See also ==
- Geography of Serbia
- List of caves in Serbia
- List of mountains in Serbia
