= Geography of Serbia =

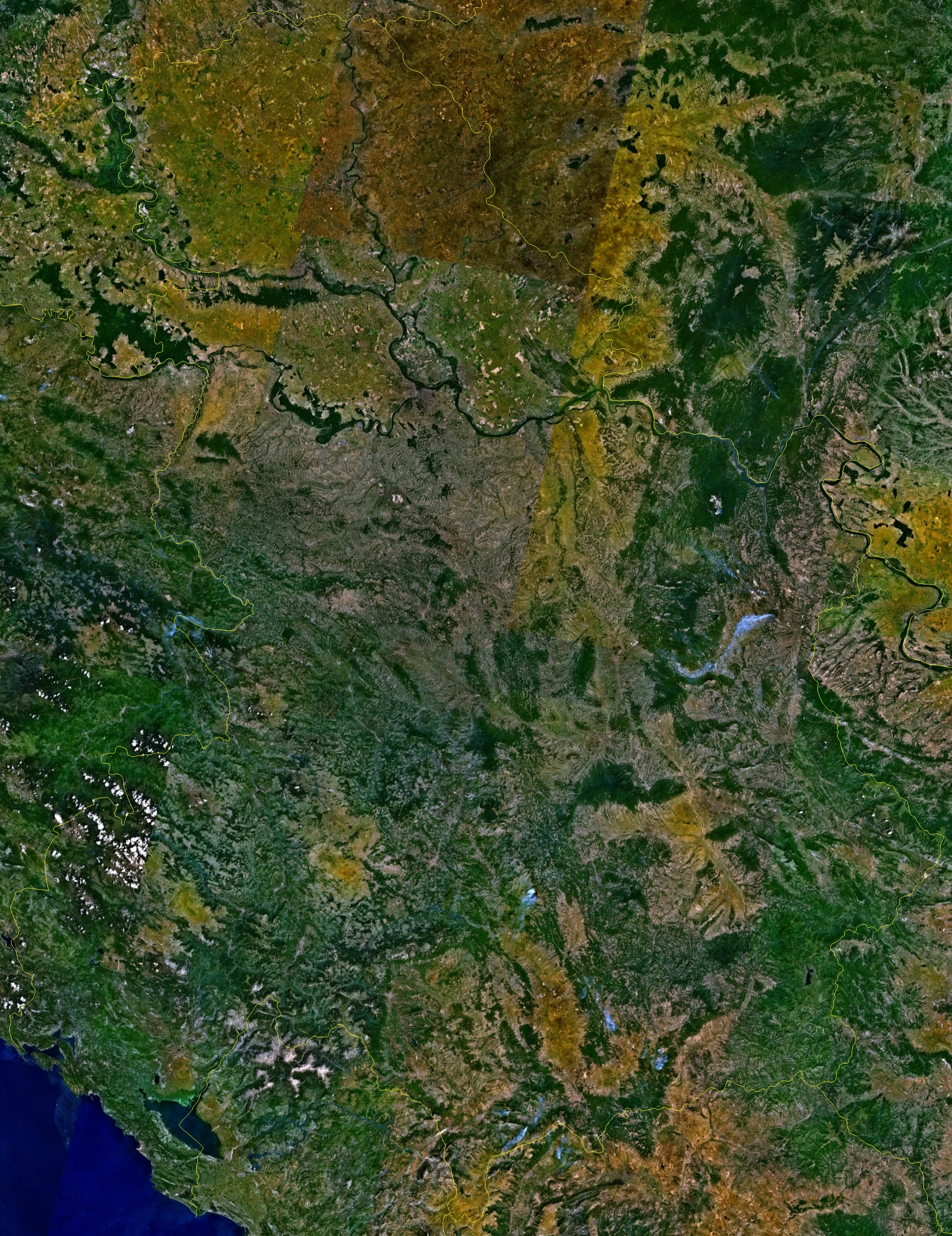
An enlargeable satellite image of Serbia

Serbia is a country situated at the crossroads of Central and Southeast Europe, territory covers (77,589 km²),covering the far southern edges of the Pannonian Plain and the central Balkans. It shares borders with Bosnia and Herzegovina, Bulgaria, Croatia, Hungary, North Macedonia, Montenegro, and Romania. Serbia shares a contested border with Albania as it doesn't recognise the independence of Kosovo. Serbia is landlocked, though it is able to access the Adriatic Sea through Montenegro and inland Europe and the Black Sea via the Danube.

== Area and borders ==
Arable land covers 19,194 km^{2} (7,411 sq mi) (24.8%), and forests cover 19,499 km^{2} (7,529 sq mi) (25.2%) of the territory of Serbia.

Serbia's total border length amounts to 2,246.7 km (1,396.0 mi), with Bosnia and Herzegovina 370.9 km (230.5 mi), with Bulgaria 360.5 km (224.0 mi), with Croatia 261.7 km (162.6 mi), with Hungary 174.7 km (108.6 mi), with North Macedonia 282.9 km (175.8 mi), with Montenegro 249.5 km (155.0 mi), with Romania, 546.5 km (339.6 mi), with Albania (if including Kosovo), 113.5 km (70.5 mi).

Extreme points:

- North: 46°11'25" N (near Hajdukovo)
- South: 41°51'27 "N (near Restelica)
- East: 23°00'47" E (near Dimitrovgrad)
- West: 18°49'16" E (near Bezdan)

== Physical geography ==
=== Topography ===
Serbia's terrain ranges from fertile plains of northern Vojvodina to limestone ranges and basins in the east and ancient mountains and hills in the southeast. The north is dominated by the Danube River. The Morava River, a tributary of the Danube, flows through the more mountainous southern regions of Serbia.

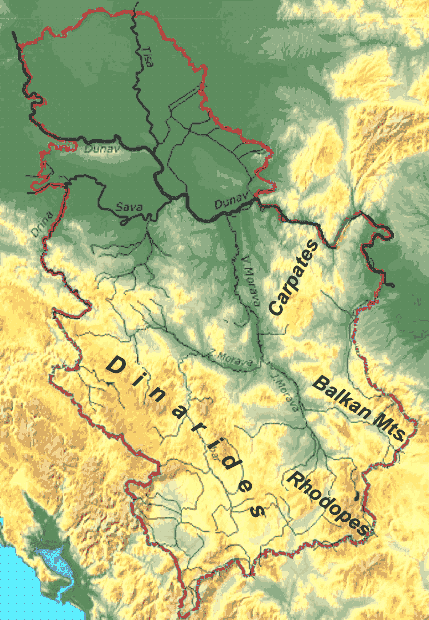
Topographic map of Serbia

The terrain of central Serbia consists chiefly of hills and low to medium-high mountains, interspersed with numerous rivers and creeks. The main communication and development line stretches southeast of Belgrade towards Niš and Skopje (in North Macedonia), along the valley formed by the Great and South Morava rivers. Most major cities, as well as the main railroad and highway, are located on or around this line. To the east of this line, in an area that is relatively sparsely populated, the terrain rises to the limestone ranges of Stara Planina and the Serbian Carpathians. To the west, mountains slowly rise towards the southwest, but do not form real ridges. Zlatibor and Kopaonik are the highest mountains of this area.

Mountains cover the largest parts of the country. Four mountain systems meet in Serbia: the Dinaric Alps in the west cover the greatest territory, stretching from northwest to southeast. The Carpathian and Balkan Mountains stretch in a north–south direction in eastern Serbia, east of the Morava valley. Ancient mountains along the South Morava, the highest one being Besna Kobila, belong to the Rila-Rhodope mountain system.

The most significant mountains in Serbia are:

- Kopaonik
- Stara Planina
- Mokra Gora
- Besna Kobila
- Dukat
- Golija
- Suva Planina
- Gramada
- Tara
- Zlatibor

The highest peak in Serbia is Midžor at 2,169 m.

=== Hydrology ===
Practically the entire territory (92%) of Serbia belongs to the Danube (Black Sea) drainage basin.

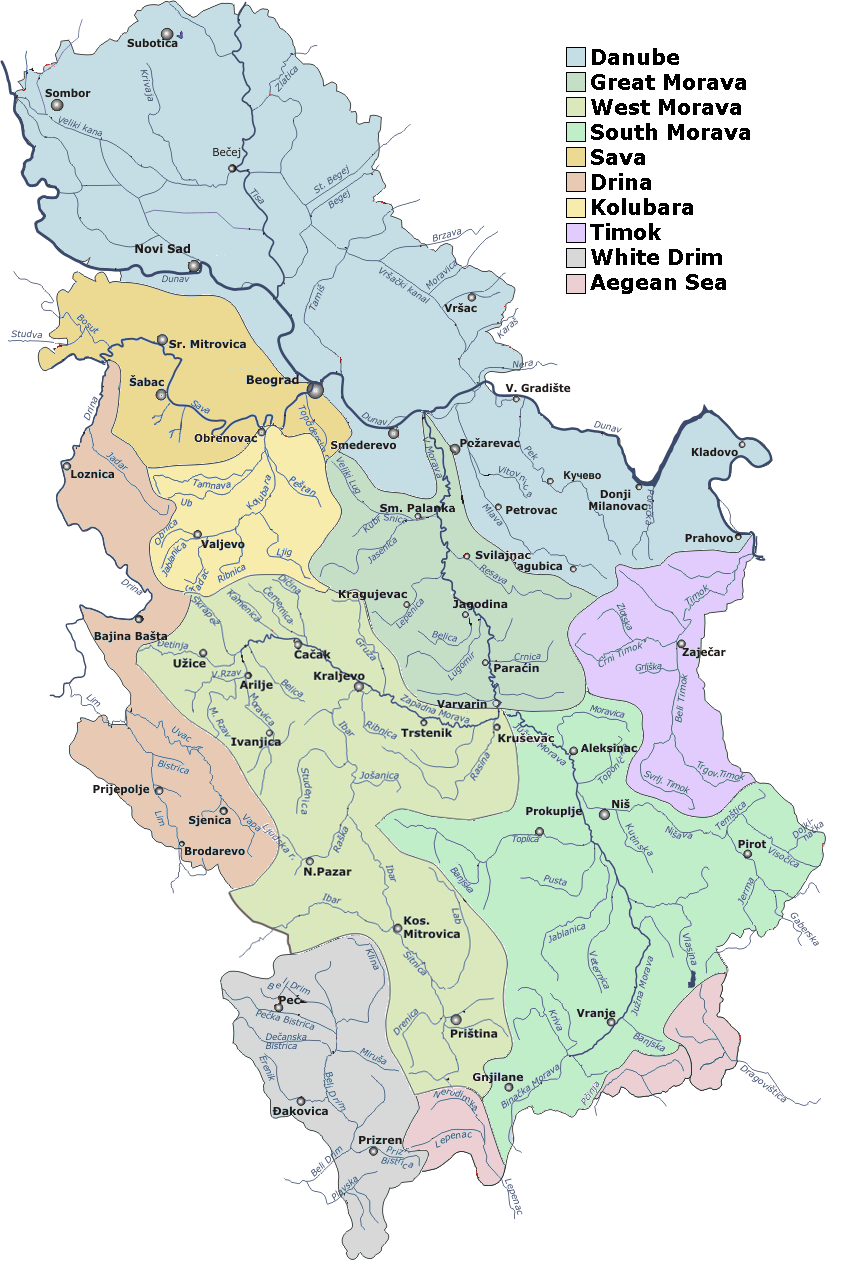
Hydrographic map of Serbia

The Danube flows 588 km through Serbia or as a border river (with Croatia in the northwest and Romania in the southeast). Other chief rivers in Serbia are tributaries of the Danube including the Sava (flowing from the west), Tisa (flowing from the north), Drina (flowing from the south, forming a natural border with Bosnia and Herzegovina), and Morava. Only the Morava flows nearly entirely through Serbia. Their tributaries form a dense network of smaller rivers and creeks that cover most of the country.

Due to its terrain, natural lakes in Serbia are sparse and small and most are located in Vojvodina, such as the glacial lake Palić and numerous oxbow lakes along rivers. There are, however, numerous artificial lakes, mostly due to the construction of hydroelectric dams, the biggest being Đerdap on the Danube, Perućac on the Drina, and Vlasina Lake.

The abundance of relatively unpolluted surface water and numerous underground water sources of high quality might present opportunities for exportation and economic improvement. Extensive exploitation and production of bottled water has begun only recently. Despite the country's access to these water resources, water supply to many Serbian cities is poor due to mismanagement and a lack of adequate investment in infrastructure. This is complicated by water pollution (e.g., pollution in the Ibar River from Trepča zinc-lead compounds affecting Kraljevo and the presence of natural arsenic in underground waters in Zrenjanin).

The theoretical hydroenergetic potential in Serbia is estimated to be around 17,000 GWh. Roughly 10,000 GWh or 60% of Serbia's hydroenergetic potential is generated by large power plants. The remainder could be generated in small and medium power plants (<25 MW), whose construction by the private sector may improve Serbia's economy and energy reliability.

Serbia also has a huge geothermal potential, but it is only partially and sporadically accessed. Geothermal water is primarily used for balneological purposes: there are around 60 spas in Serbia, which are seen as an opportunity to improve tourism in the country.

=== Climate ===
Köppen climate classification map of Serbia

Climate of Serbia is moderate continental with a diversity on local level, caused by geographic location, relief, terrain exposition, presence of river and lake systems, vegetation, urbanization etc. Proximity of the mountain ranges of Alps, Carpathians, Rhodopes, as well as Adriatic Sea and Pannonian plain affect the climate. Location of river ravines and plains in the northern area of the country enable occasional deep southward protrusion of polar air masses on winters, while hot Saharan air often intrudes over the Mediterranean Sea on summers.

Average annual air temperature for the period 1961-1990 for the area with the altitude of up to 300 m (980 ft) amounts to 11 °C (51.8 °F). The areas with the altitudes of 300 to 500 m (984 to 1,640 ft) have average annual temperature of around 10.5 °C (50.9 °F), and over 1,000 m (3,281 ft) of altitude around 6 °C (42.8 °F).

Annual precipitation, generally, rises with altitude. In lower regions, it ranges in the interval from 540 to 820 mm (21.3 to 32.3 in), areas on altitude over 1,000 m (3,281 ft) receive in average 700 to 1,000 mm (27.6 to 39.4 in), and some mountainous summits in southwestern Serbia up to 1,500 mm (59.1 in). Major part of Serbia has continental precipitation regimen, with peak in the earlier summer period, except for southwest, which receives highest precipitation autumn. May–June is the rainiest month, with the average of 12 to 13% of total annual amount. February and October have the least precipitation. Snow cover can occurs from late November to early March, and majority of days with snow cover is in January.

Annual sums of solar radiation are in the interval from 1500 to 2200 hours annually.

Surface air circulation is largely influenced by orographic lift. In warmer part of the year, winds from northwest and west prevail. In Vojvodina and Sumadija, east-southeast wind, Košava, dominates over autumn and winter. Southwestern winds prevail in mountainous part of southwestern Serbia.

=== Biodiversity ===
Serbia has five national parks and many national nature reserves encompassing 5% of the territory.

National parks

- Đerdap: 640 km^{2} (250 sq mi)
- Tara: 220 km^{2} (85 sq mi)
- Kopaonik: 120 km (75 mi)
- Fruška Gora: 250 km (160 mi)

Nature parks

- Stara Planina 1,420 km^{2} (550 sq mi)
- Golija 750 km^{2} (290 sq mi)
- Kučaj 1,150 km^{2} (440 sq mi)
- Gornje Podunavlje 100 km^{2} (39 sq mi)

Special nature reservations

- Deliblatska Peščara 300 km^{2} (120 sq mi)
- Ludaš Lake 593 ha (1,470 acres)
- Obedska bara 175.01 km^{2} (67.57 sq mi)
- Carska Bara 17.67 km^{2} (6.82 sq mi)

Nature monuments

- Đavolja Varoš 64 ha (160 acres)

== Human geography ==
Serbia has 6,167 registered settlements: 207 urban and 5,960 rural.

== See also ==
- List of regions of Serbia
- Geology of Serbia

== Bibliography ==
- Poljak, Željko (February 1959). "N. R. Srbija". Kazalo za "Hrvatski planinar" i "Naše planine" 1898—1958 (PDF). Naše planine (in Croatian). Vol. XI. p. 26. ISSN 0354-0650.
