= 1983 Kopaonik earthquake =

Earthquake in Serbia

- Location within Serbia
- UTC time: 1983-09-10 06:14:24
- ISC event: 568120
- USGS-ANSS: ComCat
- Local date: September 10, 1983
- Magnitude: 5.1 mb
- Depth: 10 km (6 mi)
- Epicenter: 43.246°N 20.859°E
- Areas affected: Serbia
- Max. intensity: MMI VIII (Severe)
- Casualties: None reported

The 1983 Kopaonik earthquake occurred on September 10 at 06:14 UTC with a body wave magnitude of 5.3 and a maximum Mercalli intensity of VIII (Severe). The epicenter was in the Kopaonik mountains of Serbia. It affected seven villages, leaving 200 homeless, and damaged 1,200 buildings and dwellings.

Kopaonik was hit five times by earthquakes of intensity VII to VIII between 1978 and 1985.

== See also ==
- 1998 Mionica earthquake
- 2010 Kraljevo earthquake
- List of earthquakes in 1983
- List of earthquakes in Serbia
