= June 2022 Afghanistan earthquake =

Earthquake in Afghanistan and Pakistan

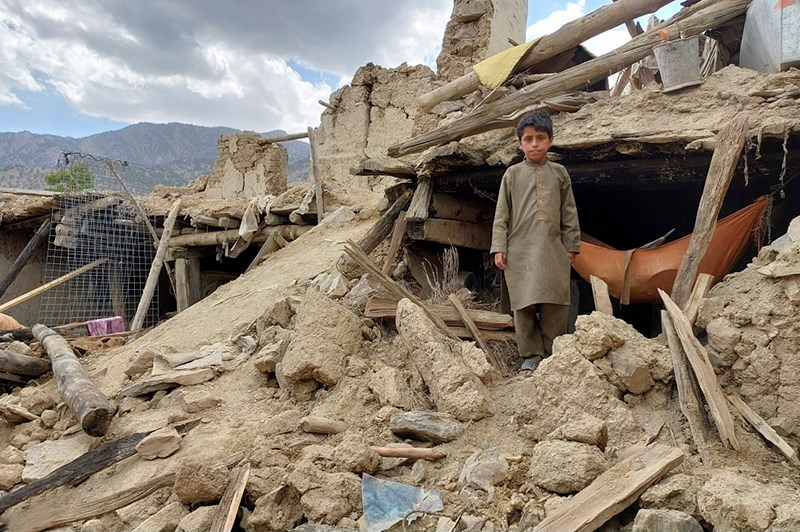
- A child stands amidst the rubble of a house

- Location within Afghanistan Location within Pakistan
- UTC time: 2022-06-21 20:54:36
- ISC event: 624496986
- USGS-ANSS: ComCat
- Local date: June 22, 2022
- Local time: 01:24:36 (UTC+04:30) 01:54:36 (UTC+05:00)
- Magnitude: 6.2 M_{w}
- Depth: 4.0 km (2.5 mi)
- Epicenter: 33.02°N 69.46°E
- Type: Strike-slip
- Areas affected: Paktika, Paktia, and Khost Provinces, Afghanistan; Dera Ismail Khan and Bannu Divisions, Pakistan
- Max. intensity: MMI IX (Violent)
- Aftershocks: Yes
- Casualties: 1,052–1,163 killed, 1,627–2,976 injured

A 4.0-kilometre (2.5 mi) deep earthquake measuring a magnitude (M_{w}) of 6.2 struck southeastern Afghanistan on 22 June 2022 at 01:24:36 AFT (on 21 June 2022 at 20:54:36 UTC). The earthquake had a maximum Modified Mercalli intensity of IX (Violent). There were between 1,052 to 1,163 deaths and 1,627 to 2,976 injured in Afghanistan and Pakistan. The worst affected provinces in Afghanistan were Paktika, Paktia, Khost, and Nangarhar. Casualties and damage also occurred in Pakistan's Khyber Pakhtunkhwa. At least 10,000 homes collapsed or were severely damaged. The earthquake's shallow hypocenter, proximity to populated areas, and low building quality all contributed to its destructive effects. Shaking was felt over 500 km (310 mi) away by at least 119 million people, including Pakistan's Punjab and parts of India and Iran.

== Earthquake ==
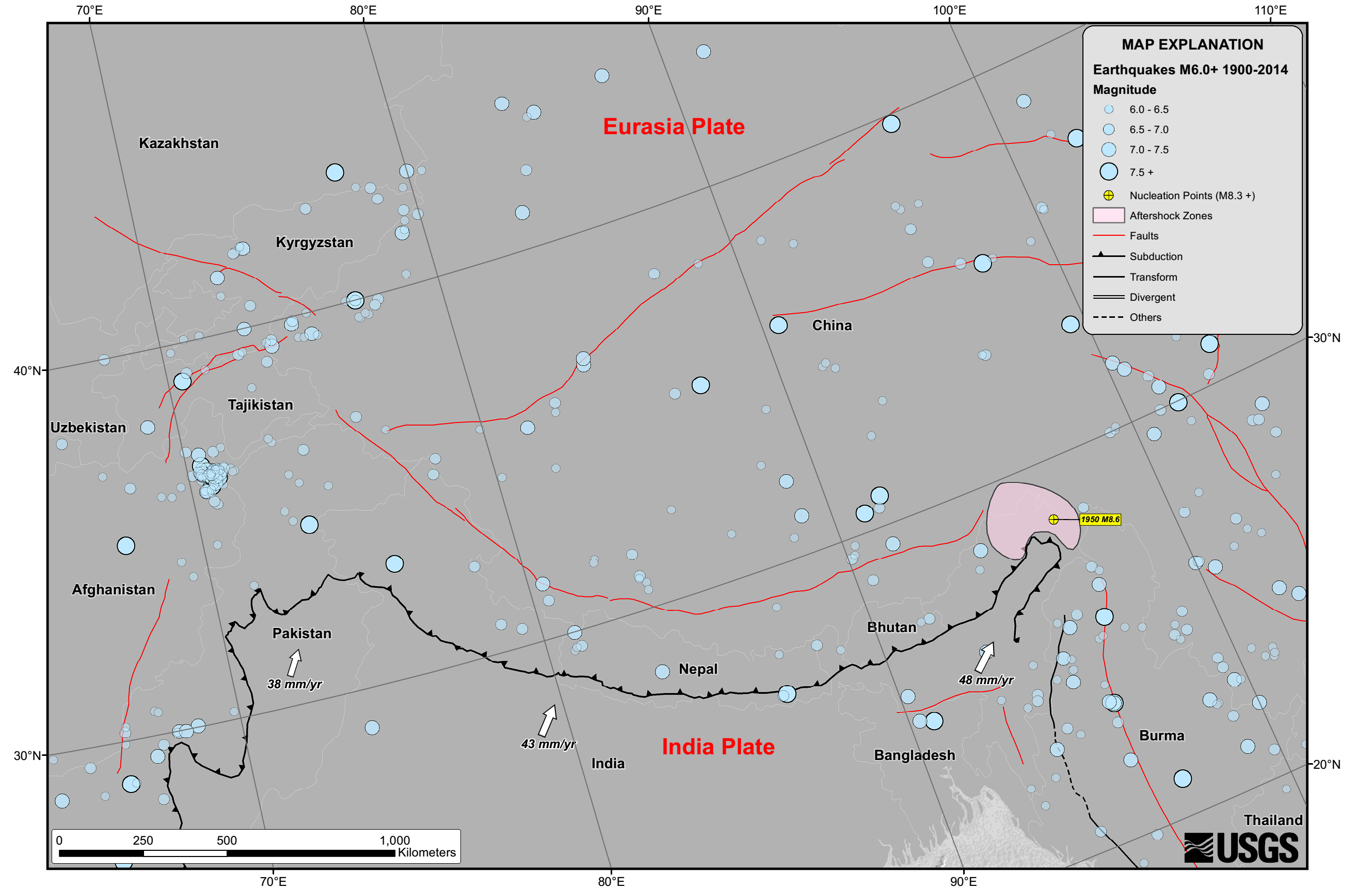
The tectonic plate boundary map of the South Asian region. Afghanistan is located on the left.

More than 7,000 people in Afghanistan have been killed by earthquakes in the past decade, averaging 560 deaths a year. A major earthquake in 2015 in northeast Afghanistan killed more than 200 people in the country and neighboring Pakistan. In 2008, a magnitude 6.4 earthquake in western Pakistan killed 166 people and destroyed several villages from triggered landslides. Thousands died when earthquakes struck the country in 2002 and 1998.

=== Tectonic setting ===
A large portion of Afghanistan is situated in a broad zone of continental deformation within the Eurasian plate. Seismic activity in Afghanistan is influenced by the subduction of the Arabian plate to the west and the oblique subduction of the Indian plate in the east. The subduction rate of the Indian plate along the continental convergent boundary is estimated to be 39 mm (1.5 in)/yr or higher. Transpression due to the plates interacting is associated with high seismicity within the shallow crust. Seismicity is detectable to a depth of 300 km (190 mi) beneath Afghanistan due to plate subduction. These earthquakes beneath the Hindu Kush are the result of movement on faults accommodating detachment of the subducted crust. Within the shallow crust, the Chaman Fault represents a major transform fault associated with large shallow earthquakes that forms the transpressional boundary between the Eurasian and Indian plates. This zone consists of seismically active thrust and strike-slip faults that have accommodated crustal deformation since the beginning of the formation of the Himalayan orogeny. Seismicity is also recorded beneath the Sulaiman Range and Spīn Ghar. These earthquakes tend to display strike-slip faulting due to its abundance and high deformation rate.

=== Characteristics ===
The United States Geological Survey (USGS) recorded the shock as 6.0 M_{ww} at 4 km (2.5 mi) depth. It released an energy yield equivalent to 475,000 tons of TNT— 37 times more powerful that the atomic bomb dropped over Hiroshima. The European-Mediterranean Seismological Centre reported the magnitude at 5.9 M_{w}, and the Global Centroid Moment Tensor recorded 6.2 M_{w} at 15.1 km (9.4 mi) depth. India's National Centre for Seismology recorded the event as M 6.1 at 10 km (6.2 mi) depth.

The earthquake occurred in proximity to the North Waziristan–Bannu Thrust Fault Zone. From inferring InSAR data, the earthquake rupture process was complex; initiating along a primary northeast–southwest striking fault plane and triggering ruptures on three secondary fault planes branching outward. A maximum slip of 2 m (6 ft 7 in) occurred at 2 km (1.2 mi) depth and the rupture was concentrated within a 10 km (6.2 mi) × 8 km (5.0 mi) area along the fault. The primary fault displayed strike-slip displacements while the three secondary structures displayed oblique-thrust or strike-slip displacements. The rupture propagated northeast–southwest for 15 km (9.3 mi) from the epicenter. It produced surface ruptures with a maximum displacement of 78.4 cm (30.9 in).

=== Intensity ===
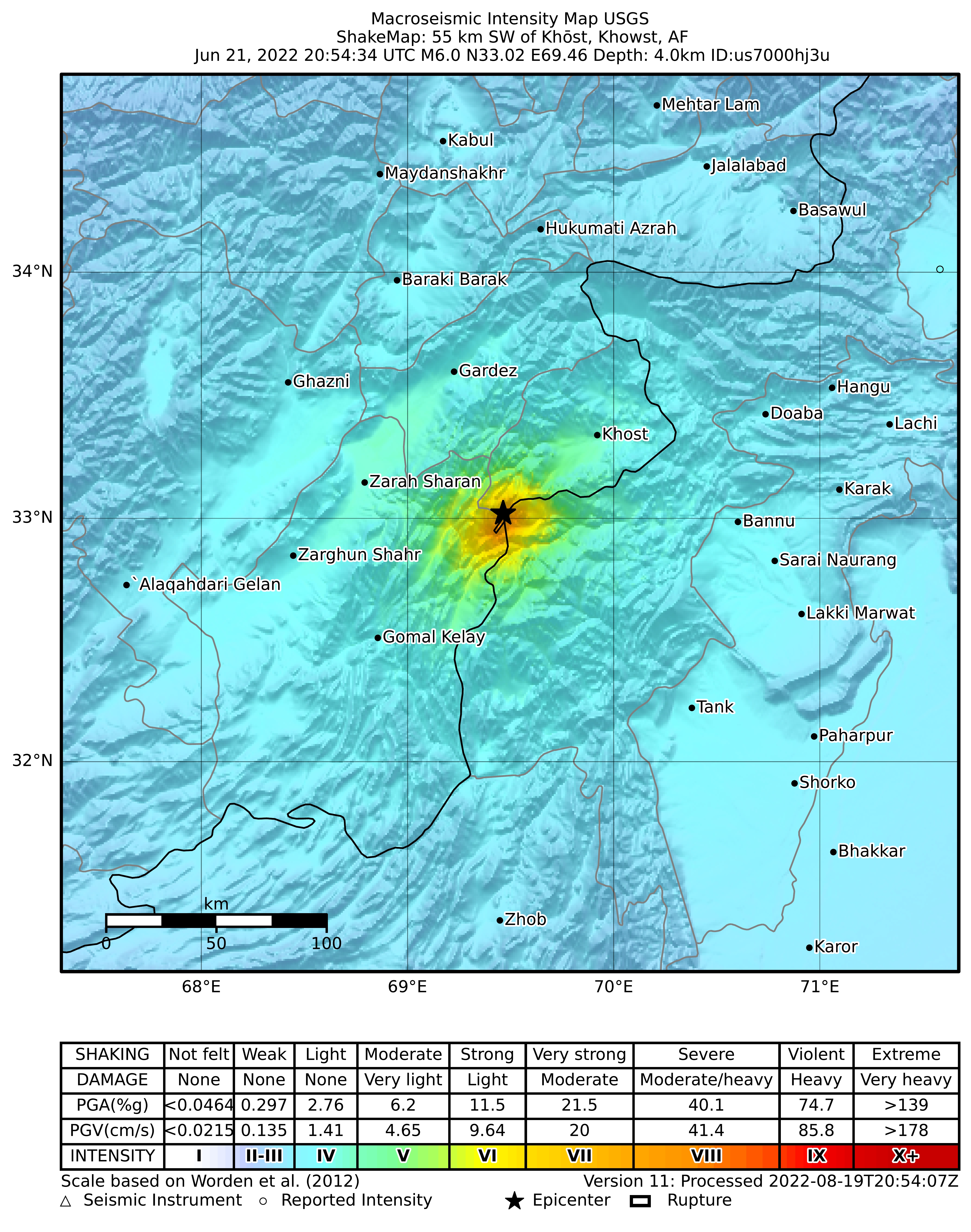
A strong ground motions map by the USGS

A maximum Modified Mercalli intensity of VIII (Severe) was estimated by the USGS. According to the USGS Prompt Assessment of Global Earthquakes for Response service, there was a 35 percent probability of shaking-related fatalities between 100 and 1,000. The service also stated that the disaster was potentially widespread. Approximately 13,000 people were within the zone of intensity VIII, and 30,000 people were exposed to VII (Very strong) shaking. Intensity VII shaking was felt in Paktika's Gayan District, while intensity V–VI (Moderate–Strong) was felt in Barmal District. An evaluation of damaged homes—of the clay brick type—and seismic effects reported by villagers indicate a maximum Modified Mercalli intensity of VIII–IX (Severe–Violent) around the rupture area.

=== Aftershocks ===
One hour after the mainshock, a mb 4.5 aftershock occurred 6 km (3.7 mi) south of the mainshock epicenter. Another aftershock measuring mb 4.2 was recorded on 24 June. It killed five people and wounded 11 more in Paktika, Afghanistan. The strongest aftershock occurred on 18 July, measuring M_{ww} 5.1, centred in Zerok District, Paktika Province. Seven hours later, a mb 4.3 aftershock occurred south of the previous event. The M_{ww} 5.1 aftershock injured at least 44 people and destroyed 600 homes which were previously damaged by prior earthquakes. A spokesman for Afghanistan's Disaster Management Ministry said fewer casualties were expected as it occurred during the day, unlike the mainshock which struck at night. Mohammad Amin Huzaifa, a provincial government spokesman, said Paktika experienced more than 30 aftershocks. On 22 August, a mb 4.6 aftershock struck at a depth of 35.9 km (22.3 mi), destroying several homes in Ster Giyan. On 23 August, a magnitude 4.6 aftershock caused several houses previously damaged by the mainshock in Gayan District to collapse.

== Impact ==
=== Afghanistan ===
Bakhtar News Agency said there were at least 1,150 deaths and 1,600 wounded. The United Nations (UN) cited a death toll of 1,039 and 2,949 people injured. Among the casualties were 230 dead and 591 injured children. It is the deadliest earthquake in Afghanistan since 2002, when over 1,200 people were killed in Baghlan Province. About 10,000 homes were either partially or totally destroyed.

Poor construction practices and building materials contributed to the high death toll. Seismologist Lucy Jones said the destruction was attributed to the shallow earthquake focus and epicenter in a densely populated, landslide-risk area where buildings made of wood and mud are not earthquake-resistant. Weeks of heavy rain prior to the earthquake had also weakened the structural integrity of homes. Many houses constructed primarily of wood and mud were razed to the ground. Heavy rain and the earthquake also contributed to landslides that added to the destruction.

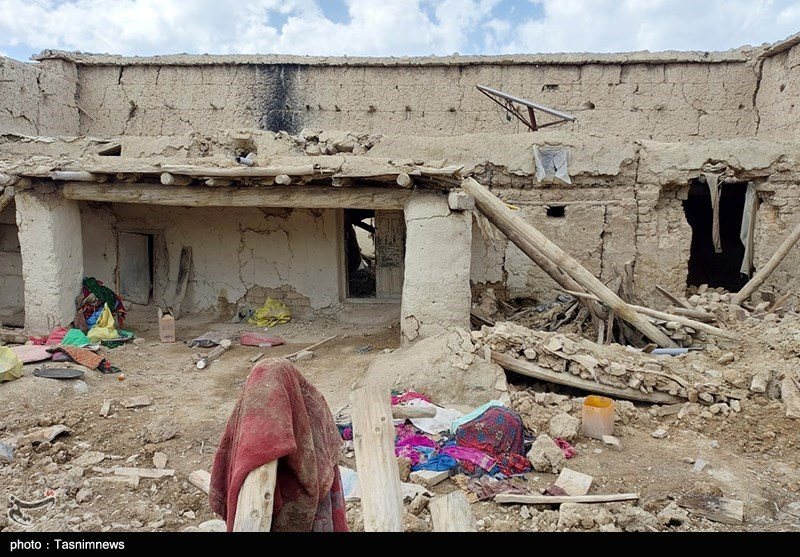
Ruins of a house

More than 25 villages were almost decimated; schools, hospitals, homes and mosques collapsed. Among the fatalities included 738 from Paktika, 381 in Paktia, 40 in Khost and five in Nangarhar.

In Urgun, a major town in Paktika Province, up to 40 bodies were recovered. In Gayan District, approximately 1,800 or 70 percent of the district's homes were destroyed and 238 people died. An additional 393 others were injured. In the village of Gayan, the local clinic with a capacity for five patients was heavily damaged. Of the 500 patients admitted, 200 died. In Barmal District, at least 500 people died and a thousand others were injured. At least 450 homes were destroyed in the district. Sixty-six schools were destroyed, 76 students died, and 149 others were injured across Gayan, Nika, Barmal and Zerok districts.

In Khost Province, at least 600 homes were destroyed. In Spera District, closest to the epicenter, 40 residents died and 95 others were injured. A total of 500 homes were destroyed in the district; the village of Afghan-Dubai was the worst affected.

Thirty Pakistani displaced persons who had shifted across the border to Afghanistan while Operation Zarb-i-Azb was underway in North Waziristan were among those killed in Afghanistan.

=== Pakistan ===
In Pakistan, 10 people died and 25 others were injured when a landslide buried a village in Khaisor, North Waziristan District. An estimated 600 people were affected in the district. Other injuries were also reported in Khyber Pakhtunkhwa. Hospitals in North Waziristan District and South Waziristan District reserved amenities for possible patients. In Darra Pezu, Lakki Marwat District, a man died when a roof fell on him. Another death was caused by a roof collapse resulting from the combined effects of the earthquake and heavy rains. In Datakhel, North Waziristan, a checkpoint station collapsed, killing a soldier and injuring two. Some mud houses were also damaged. In Peshawar, Islamabad and Punjab, shaking caused panic among residents.

== Aftermath ==
Homeless survivors sought refuge outdoors. Due to unpredictable weather conditions many were in desperate need of shelter. Others were invited to reside in the homes of their families or community members. Care International staff said most victims received head injuries, bone fractures and multiple wounds. They also said injured pregnant women were at risk of miscarriages. According to Save the Children, over 118,000 children were affected and 65 were orphaned.

Survivors dug through rubble by hand to rescue those trapped. A tribe leader from Paktika said many survivors and rescue workers rushed to attend to those affected. Some survivors were trapped beneath collapsed debris. Local businesses in the area were closed as people went to assist others. Hospitals in the region turned away patients due to insufficient resources. Several injured residents were airlifted out of the village. Medical professionals said there was a lack of painkillers and antibiotics. A number of injured patients also died on the way to hospitals; damaged roads further delayed their arrival.

Eighty-five percent of medical infrastructure including hospitals, clinics, and medical centers were destroyed or operated at reduced capacity. Some injured people were mobilized to Kabul and Ghazni for medical treatment. While many hospitals in the affected area were overworked, there was a low inflow of patients at hospitals in Kabul. Heavily damaged roads and the 177 km (110 mi) distance to Kabul from the worst affected areas prevented many patients from being transferred. Many hospitals in the capital city were capable of handling larger patient numbers. At Daoud Khan Military Hospital in Kabul, only five patients arrived via helicopter. In the Wazir Akbar Khan Hospital there were no patients. At Sharana, the capital of Paktika Province, 75 people were brought for treatment. The hospital only had 72 beds and was already treating other people with illnesses. The severely injured could be operated as the hospital was ill-equipped and were moved to other facilities. Mass graves were prepared near villages to bury the dead. In some areas, residents could not bury dead bodies due to a lack of equipment.

The UN warned of a cholera outbreak in the affected area. On 7 August, there were more than 400 cases of cholera in Spera District, Khost. At least eight people—five children and three adults—died from the disease. Officials said most of the affected were women and children. The province health director said 40 mobile health teams would respond to the outbreak.

== Domestic response ==
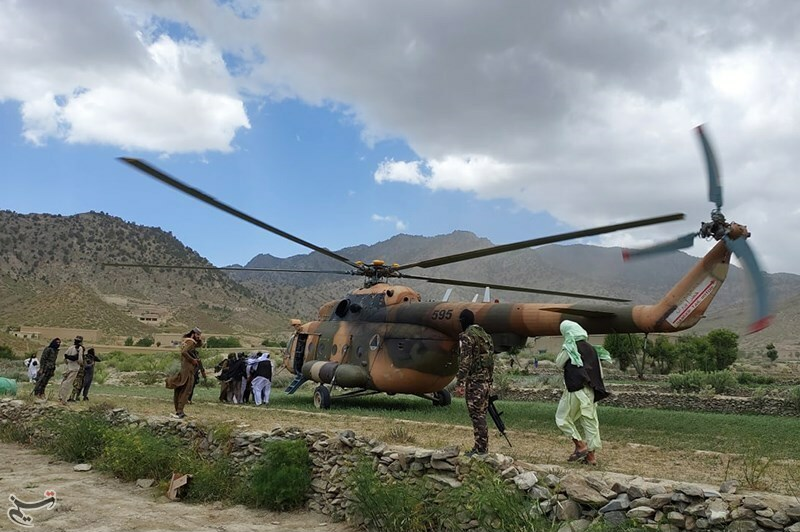
A helicopter arrives to provide aid.

The Ministry of Disaster Management of the Islamic Emirate, along with other relevant officials including governors and other Afghan people are instructed to rush to the affected area as soon as possible, evacuate the martyrs, transport and treat the wounded and take essential steps to provide emergency assistance to the displaced.

We also call on the international community and all humanitarian organizations to help the Afghan people affected by this great tragedy and to spare no effort to help the affected people.

We ask God to save our poor people from trials and harms.

— Supreme Leader Hibatullah Akhundzada, 22 June 2022

The government of Afghanistan launched rescue operation; rescue teams arrived via helicopters supplied by the Ministry of Defense. Many people were reported trapped beneath debris in Paktika Province. Rescue efforts were challenged by heavy rains, landslides and the remote setting of many villages. Officials expected the death toll to rise as recovery efforts continued.

Supreme Leader Hibatullah Akhundzada instructed the Ministry of Disaster Management and governors to "rush to the affected area as soon as possible" and asked the international community for humanitarian assistance. Hasan Akhund, the acting Prime Minister of Afghanistan, said 1 billion afghanis (around US$11.3 million) was allocated to needs of the affected population. He also authorized the transportation of relief items to the region. The Afghan Red Crescent Society brought blankets, tents and kitchen sets for affected residents.

Many injured residents were airlifted via helicopters away from the devastated area. On 22 June, the 203 Mansoori Corps said it airlifted 100 people from Paktika Province to the provincial hospital. The Ministry of Defense said seven helicopters were flown to the affected area. Helicopters also delivered medical supplies and food to the region.

Italian medical and aid organization, Emergency, provided seven ambulances and its staff to the area. In a flash update, the UN OCHA said over 130 injured survivors have been taken to four hospitals. The Afghanistan Ministry of Defense stated that five helicopters participated in evacuation efforts in Paktika. A medical party was also dispatched to Gayan District. UNICEF said teams of health and nutrition workers were assigned to work in the districts of Gayan and Barmal, Paktika and Spera, Khost. Care International established a mobile health station and a team consisting medical professionals to deal with first aid.

Despite the inflow and distribution of aid, there was inadequate food and shelter for many survivors. Poor communication services and lack of proper roads delayed aid distribution. Some roads were damaged due to landslides caused by the earthquake and rainfall. The government also faced difficulties in releasing situation updates due to poor Internet. Displaced survivors were left without shelter, food and water as aid distribution was hampered. Dead bodies laid on the streets overnight. Days after the earthquake, some villages were still waiting for aid due to distribution challenges.

The Taliban said search and rescue missions were 90 percent completed by the night of 22 June. The governor of Paktika Province, said on 23 June, rescue missions ended after 40 hours. There was no explanation for why the rescue missions ended. No press conference was held by the Taliban two days after the earthquake. A Taliban spokesman said no additional bodies were found beneath the rubble in Paktika Province.

A spokesman for the Ministry of Disaster Management said there was a shortage of medical supplies. In late July, the Ministry of Industry and Trade supplied 240 tons of food which were provided by nine private companies.

Pakistani military sources in Miranshah said there were plans to transfer the injured across the border so medical procedures could be carried out. Bodies of the 30 tribal members killed in Afghanistan would be returned to Pakistan where they came from. These members fled Pakistan during a 2014 military operation.

On 25 June, the health department in Pakistan declared a state of emergency in the district hospitals of North Waziristan, South Waziristan, Dera Ismail Khan and Bannu. The general-director of Khyber Pakhtunkhwa said hospital staff cancelled leave to treat critically injured patients from Afghanistan. Trucks from Pakistan also crossed into Afghanistan to bring medical equipment and critical drugs. A team of 70 health professionals from Rescue 1122 was deployed to conduct surgeries and intensive care procedures. At Khost Airport, people with minor injuries were treated at the medical camp. Patients with severe injuries were taken to Waziristan. At least 14 injured victims from Afghanistan have been transferred to Pakistan for medical treatment. At least 60 doctors in Pakistan volunteered to assist in treating the wounded. Afghan medical students studying in Khyber Pakhtunkhwa also expressed interest in contributing.

== International response ==
Dealing with disasters was a struggle for Afghanistan's emergency services before the Taliban takeover. With many international aid organizations having fled the country after the previous government was overthrown, rescue efforts were likely to progress at a slower pace. It poses a challenge at the same time that Afghanistan faces flooding and an economic crisis. Many nations induced sanctions following the Taliban's takeover, especially in the banking sector, cutting the country from much international assistance.

In Pakistan, trucks were expected to bring medicine, shelters, blankets and other relief goods across the border to Afghanistan on the orders of Prime Minister Shehbaz Sharif on the night of 22 June. Beginning 23 June, a total of 13 trucks carried relief materials including tents, tarpaulin, blankets and medicine for the victims in Afghanistan. The Prime Minister of Azad Kashmir, Sardar Tanveer Ilyas, announced ₹100 million in assistance. Under the arrangements of the Pak-Afghan Cooperation Forum, two trucks crossed into Afghanistan from Ghulam Khan to deliver food rations.

The Indian Ministry of External Affairs said India stood "in solidarity with the people of Afghanistan" and remained "firmly committed to provide immediate relief assistance". It dispatched 27 tonnes of emergency relief assistance in two flights, consisting of items including tents, sleeping bags and blankets. At the UNSC briefing on the disaster, India expressed condolences and vowed support, but also warned against "any possible diversion of funds and misuse of exemptions from sanctions". A technical team from India also arrived at Kabul to coordinate the distribution of humanitarian aid.

Seiji Kihara, the Deputy Chief Cabinet Secretary of Japan, said the Japanese government was planning to coordinate relief efforts. The Japanese government pledged US$3 million in emergency aid and provided relief supplies to the region. In addition, US$14 million was pledged to develop Afghanistan's agriculture industry. South Korea's foreign affairs ministry said US$1 million worth of humanitarian aid would be provided. The Singapore Red Cross appealed for US$50 thousand in funding. Singapore's Ministry of Foreign Affairs said it would contribute US$50 thousand to the appeal. Taiwan's Ministry of Foreign Affairs said it would donate US$1 million for homes to be rebuilt. The ministry added that due to the nature of the disaster and physical challenges, no rescue personnel would be involved in rescue and recovery efforts.

The Afghan community in Australia took to social media to appeal for funding. Over A$5 thousand was raised within a few hours of the appeal. Wahidullah Waissi, the ambassador of Afghanistan to Australia, said the Australian government should "donate generously". The Australian government pledged to donate A$5 million. Penny Wong, Australia's Foreign Minister, said it was part of the A$140 million Australia pledged to Afghanistan since September 2021.

Two Iranian aircraft arrived at Khost International Airport carrying aid, including food, tents and carpets to be distributed. A third consignment of humanitarian aid was flown into Kabul the following day. The head of the Iranian Red Crescent Society said the organization was ready to provide relief, medical assistance and rescue efforts to the affected parties.

The United Arab Emirates supplied 30 metric tonnes of relief on the instructions of UAE President Mohamed bin Zayed Al Nahyan. On 3 July, the nation provided an additional 16 metric tonnes of medical equipments. Three aircraft carrying a 1,000 m^{3} (35,000 cu ft) field hospital, 75 beds and two operating halls arrived in Khost.

The Chinese Foreign Ministry offered its condolences and said the nation was ready to provide emergency assistance to Afghanistan. The country also vowed US$7.5 million in aid, tents, towels and beds. The Ministry of Foreign Affairs said it would deliver US$7.5 million worth of humanitarian relief for the victims. Six Xi'an Y-20 transport aircraft arrived in Kabul on 28 June to deliver 105 tonnes of humanitarian aid. The ambassador of China to Afghanistan said seven Chinese aircraft would deliver supplies. The Chinese Ambassador to Afghanistan also provided 18 tons of supplies and US$200 thousand to the Afghan Red Crescent Society.

The United Kingdom's government pledged to provide £2.5 million for immediate life-saving assistance. Twenty tonne of food and medicine was supplied by Turkmenistan. An additional 74 tons of aid was provided by Uzbekistan. A Pakistani Lockheed AC-130 and Qatari aircraft arrived at Khost Airport to deliver aid. The Qatari aircraft originated from Al Udeid Air Base carrying 13 tonnes of aid. IsraAid said it would deliver important medical supplies. About €10 thousand worth of aid was supplied by the Hungarian government and the Hungarian Ecumenical Charity, according to the foreign minister. According to the OCHA, the government of Austria pledged €7 million in aid that would be directed to aid organizations to prevent "misuse by the Taliban".

=== United States ===
In a statement by National Security Advisor Jake Sullivan, the United States said it would be committed to supporting the people of Afghanistan. President Joe Biden appointed USAID and other relevant federal partners to evaluate the response options. On 22 June, the Spokesperson for the United States Department of State, Ned Price, said the United States would be open to discussion.

The Taliban repeatedly called for the United States to unfreeze its foreign assets and loosen financial sanctions to ease in the recovery process. In February 2022, an executive order was released by President Joe Biden to unfreeze half of Afghanistan's US$7 billion in the United States.

According to USAID on 28 June US$55 million in immediate humanitarian relief would be provided to address the urgent issues faced by survivors. Assistance by USAID was intended to provide basic needs to survivors, and alleviate the spread of diseases due to poor sanitation. The funding would total over US$774 million in overall humanitarian assistance to Afghanistan by the United States since August 2021. On 29 June, United States government officials and the Taliban held talks to discuss the humanitarian and economical crisis. The talks were also intended to address the issue with Afghanistan's frozen foreign assets. Afghanistan's Foreign Minister, Amir Khan Muttaqi, along with other officials and representatives were involved in the talks. United States Special Representative Thomas West and officials from the Department of the Treasury attended the talk, which was held at Doha, Qatar.

In August 2022, the Biden administration ruled out the release of frozen funds held by the Afghan Central Bank in the United States. After a recent terrorism intervention in central Kabul, killing of al Qa’ida leader Ayman al-Zawahiri, earlier talks with the Taliban were abandoned due to international security reasons. A number of renowned international economists and academic experts called for the United States and other nations to release the US$9 billion of frozen Afghan Central Bank assets because "without access to its foreign reserves, the central bank of Afghanistan cannot carry out its normal, essential functions."

=== International organizations ===
Ten tonnes of medical stockpile supplied was sufficient for 5,400 surgeries, according to the World Health Organization (WHO). The WHO said trauma teams arrived in Paktika to provide psychological counselling to survivors. On 28 June, 25 metric tonnes of supplies were flown to Kabul; expected to address the needs of up to 400,000 people. The UN made a dire appeal for US$110.3 million to assist over 360,000 affected people. Over half the funded money was to provide emergency shelters and non-food supplies to displaced survivors. The remaining US$35 million was allocated to dietary and medical necessities. The WHO provided an additional 25 metric tonnes of medical supplies from its hub in Dubai for over 400,000 individuals. The WHO also supported six hospitals in Paktika, Khost, Paktya and Ghazni provinces. The United Nations High Commissioner for Refugees (UNHCR) said tents, sheeting and blankets have been distributed to the affected.

The World Food Programme delivered food to approximately 14,000 individuals and provided an additional 10,000 tonnes of wheat. The UN said trauma care, shelter, non-food essentials, food, water and sanitary items were distributed. A UN official said the organization does not have the capabilities to carry out search and rescue operations. The organization made a formal request to the Turkish embassy in Afghanistan to carry out the missions. The cost of an immediate response was estimated at US$15 million. Preparations were also made to prevent a cholera outbreak. The United Nations High Commissioner for Refugees pledged to construct over 2,000 homes for 11,000 affected people residing in temporary camps.

At a UN Security Council meeting on 23 June, aid chief Martin Griffiths said the Taliban was hindering aid transportation. According to the UN, millions of aid dollars could not be transferred due to the de-risking measures taken by Afghanistan's banking system. The UN launched a system to swap aid dollars in exchange for the local currency in a response to the failing economy and to avoid Taliban leaders. The Central Emergency Response Fund allocated US$10 million.

The EU announced Afghanistan would receive €1 million in humanitarian aid to address urgent needs. Funding would be implemented by active humanitarian organizations in the country. Christian Aid started a £100 thousand aid to help survivors. The group said US$100, each, would be distributed to between 500 and 700 families.

The Turkish Red Crescent (Kizilay) also provided food packs to 500 families. Kizilay also worked with the Foreign Ministry of Taiwan to supply "immediate relief to the victims and carry forward the spirit of humanitarian concern". The organization said reconstruction of homes and education facilities would be part of the recuperation plan. Turkish NGO IHH distributed food, blankets and tents to 1,560 survivors in Paktika Province. Malteser International provided €100 thousand in emergency relief.

By 27 June, aid had reached nearly all the affected areas. The deputy president of the Afghan Red Crescent Society, Nooruddin Turabi, said "there is not so much of a need for food or non-food items". He also added enough aid had been given to the affected. Focus shifted to long-term relief in the region, with cash being critical for survivors to purchase basic needs, according to him.

In August the UNHCR began a US$14 million project to construct 2,300 earthquake-resistant homes in Paktika's Giyan and Barmal districts, and Spera District in Khost. These homes would also be designed to adapt to winter conditions. Each family would receive solar panels and a bukhāri. The Bahrain Royal Humanitarian Foundation signed an agreement with the UNHCR to increase aid. Aid was to support the housing project. The United Nations Development Programme also established a scheme to improve healthcare, education, and water systems in the districts.

In December, survivors who previously stayed in tents moved into newly constructed homes in Paktika. Local workers constructed hundreds of earthquake-resistant homes in support of the UN. According to the UNHCR, the homes have solar panels, independent toilets, and traditional heaters for residents during extreme winters. After the winter, the UNHCR will construct two schools and a clinic in the area.

== See also ==
- Lists of 21st-century earthquakes
- List of earthquakes in 2022
- List of earthquakes in Afghanistan
- List of earthquakes in Pakistan
- 2025 Afghanistan earthquake
