= 1998 Afghanistan earthquake =

There were two major earthquakes in Afghanistan in 1998:

- February 1998 Afghanistan earthquake
- May 1998 Afghanistan earthquake

== See also ==
- Afghanistan earthquake (disambiguation)
