= February 1998 Afghanistan earthquake =

1998 earthquake centered in northeastern Afghanistan

- Location within Afghanistan
- UTC time: 1998-02-04 14:33:23
- ISC event: 1075205
- USGS-ANSS: ComCat
- Local date: February 4, 1998
- Local time: 19:03:23
- Magnitude: 5.9 M_{w}
- Depth: 30 km (19 mi)
- Epicenter: 37.17°N 70.14°E
- Type: Strike-slip
- Areas affected: Takhar Province, Afghanistan
- Total damage: Extreme
- Max. intensity: MMI VIII (Severe)
- Casualties: 2,323–4,000 dead 818 injured

An earthquake occurred on 4 February 1998 at 19:03 local time near the Afghanistan-Tajikistan border. The strike-slip shock had a moment magnitude of 5.9 and a maximum Mercalli intensity of VIII (Severe). With several thousand dead and hundreds injured, the event's effects were considered extreme by the National Geophysical Data Center. It was felt at Tashkent and Dushanbe, and aftershocks continued for the next seven days.

== Cause ==
Afghanistan is situated on a major plate boundary. The location of the country is on the boundary where two tectonic plates, the Iranian plate and the Eurasian plate, meet. To the south of Afghanistan, the Indian plate moves northwards and to the north the Eurasian plate moves south-eastwards. The collision resulting from the movement of the plates has been under way for 50 million years. Due to this, Afghanistan is vulnerable to earthquakes. Both the Iranian plate and the Eurasian plate consist of continental crust, which can neither sink nor be destroyed. As a result, the rocks between the two plates are forced upwards to form mountains. The constant movement of the Iranian plate results in an increase in pressure. The earthquake on February 4, 1998, was caused by this increase in pressure.

== Casualties and damage ==
A death toll of at least 2,323 was reported by the United States Geological Survey (USGS). A spokesman for the United Islamic Front for the Salvation of Afghanistan, which controlled certain areas, told the Afghan Islamic Press that they removed more than 3,500 bodies. According to the estimates by the Taliban government in Kabul, which ruled the Islamic Emirate of Afghanistan at that time, 3,230 people died in the earthquake. Médecins Sans Frontières (MSF) later put the death toll at 4,000. The anti-Taliban Afghan Embassy in Dushanbe asserted that approximately 15,000 people became homeless and dozens of villages were destroyed. Nearly 15,000 houses were destroyed primarily due to the landslides. Approximately 818 people were injured and 6,725 livestock were killed.

== Relief efforts ==
As the Takhar Province was a remote area and road transport and telecommunication was poor, it took three days for the news to reach Kabul. On February 7, reports began to reach the capital city, but relief work was hampered and delayed because of bad weather like fog, low cloud and snowfalls, blocked mountain tracks (due to snowfall and landslide) and the civil war. Reports indicated that survivors were living without shelter in subzero temperature and many were starving. Several villagers were making their way down the mountain tracks along with their herds of goats.

The International Red Cross and Red Crescent Movement sent a team from Dushanbe to the affected region for relief efforts. The first international relief team reached the affected area on February 7 and the first United Nations (UN) team arrived there on February 10. A convoy of the International Committee of the Red Cross (ICRC) reached the site on February 14 with 4,800 blankets, 800 quilts, 10 rolls of plastic sheeting and approximately 200 tents. Eleven days after the event, on February 16, helicopters were able to drop supplies to three isolated villages. The European Union (EU) offered £1.3m of relief aid including blankets, medical equipment, water and tents. The Taliban-ruled Islamic Emirate of Afghanistan offered 100 tonnes each of rice and wheat, and approximately £40,000 to the affected region.

== See also ==
- List of earthquakes in 1998
- List of earthquakes in Afghanistan
- May 1998 Afghanistan earthquake
- June 2022 Afghanistan earthquake – another moderate earthquake nearby that caused hundreds of deaths.
