= List of earthquakes in Serbia =

This is a list of earthquakes in Serbia that had epicentres in Serbia or within the current borders had a significant impact on the country.

== Earthquakes ==
Date	Location	Mag.	MMI	Deaths	Injuries	Notes	Ref
2010-11-03	Raška, Kraljevo	5.5 M_{w}	VIII	2	100+	Severe damage	
1999-07-01	Rasina	5.2 M_{w}	VI			Several roofs and chimneys damage in the Milutovac, Medveđa, Trstenik area.	
1999-04-30	Kolubara	5.4 M_{w}	VI–VII			Several homes damaged in Ljig area.	
1998-09-29	Kolubara, Mionica	5.5 M_{w}	VIII	1	17	Severe damage	
1991-07-12	Timiș (Romania)	5.6 M_{w}	VII	2	30	Severe damage in Timișoara, in Romania. Slight damage at Belgrade.	
1987-08-14	Moravica District	5.0 M_{w}	VI		2	Many buildings damage in the Kraljevo-Bogutovacka Banja area	
1983-09-10	Kopaonik	5.1 M_{w}	VIII			1,200 buildings damage	
1980-05-18	Raška	5.8 M_{w}	VII			Many buildings damage	
1979-04-15	Bar Municipality (Montenegro)	6.9 M_{w}	X			Widely felt in the country.	
1927-05-15	Kragujevac	6.0 M_{w}					
1922-03-24	Moravica District	6.0 M_{w}					
1738-05-31	Vrancea (Romania)	7.9 M_{w}	IX–X			In Niš, the fortress on Nišava partially collapsed, and in Nikopol on Danube four mosques collapsed.	

== See also ==
- List of earthquakes in Albania
- List of earthquakes in Bosnia and Herzegovina
- List of earthquakes in Croatia
- List of earthquakes in Greece
