= 1998 Adana–Ceyhan earthquake =

Earthquake in Turkey

- Location within Turkey
- UTC time: 1998-06-27 13:55:53
- ISC event: 1147835
- USGS-ANSS: ComCat
- Local date: 27 June 1998
- Local time: 16:55:53 TRT
- Magnitude: 6.3 M_{w}
- Depth: 20 km (12 mi)
- Epicenter: 36.94°N 35.26°E
- Type: Strike-slip
- Areas affected: Turkey
- Total damage: $1 billion
- Max. intensity: EMS-98 IX (Destructive)
- Aftershocks: 5.4 M_{w} July 4 at 02:15 UTC
- Casualties: At least 145 dead 1,500–1,600 injured 8,800 displaced

The 1998 Adana–Ceyhan earthquake occurred at 16:55 local time on 27 June with a moment magnitude of 6.3 and a maximum intensity of IX (Destructive) on the European macroseismic scale. The total economic loss was estimated at US$1 billion.

The event occurred in Cilicia region in southern Turkey and killed at least 145 people and left 1,500 people wounded and many thousands homeless in Adana, and Ceyhan, the most populous town of the Adana Province, as well as many villages located between both cities along the Ceyhan River. The most casualties and damage occurred due to inadequately engineered buildings in the town of Ceyhan.

== International search and rescue efforts ==
Multiple countries such as: Germany, Sweden, Britain, Switzerland, Israel, Italy, and France, offered help to Turkey in the aftermath of the quake. The United Nations also conducted an assessment mission and placed its disaster management team on standby, ready to provide humanitarian assistance if requested.

=== Government stance ===
Despite these international offers, the Turkish government explicitly stated that it did not require international assistance for search and rescue or immediate relief operations. The government expressed gratitude for the offers but maintained that national and local resources were sufficient to manage the crisis.

== See also ==
- List of earthquakes in 1998
- List of earthquakes in Turkey
