= 1998 Aiquile earthquake =

Earthquake in Bolivia

- Location within Bolivia
- UTC time: 1998-05-22 04:48:53
- ISC event: 1108072
- USGS-ANSS: ComCat
- Local date: May 22, 1998
- Local time: 00:48:53
- Magnitude: 6.6 M_{w}
- Depth: 25 km (16 mi)
- Epicenter: 17.91°S 65.47°W
- Type: Strike-slip
- Areas affected: Bolivia
- Total damage: Severe
- Max. intensity: MMI VIII (Severe)
- Casualties: 95–105+ dead 50–150 injured 6,900 displaced

The 1998 Aiquile earthquake occurred on May 22 at 00:48:53 local time in Bolivia. This strike-slip earthquake had a moment magnitude of 6.6 and a maximum Mercalli intensity of VIII (Severe). Damage was severe, with at least 95 deaths, 50–150 injuries, and 6,900 homeless.

== See also ==
- Lists of earthquakes
- List of earthquakes in 1998
