= 1998 North Maluku earthquake =

Earthquake in Indonesia

- Location within Sulawesi Location within Indonesia
- UTC time: 1998-11-29 14:10:31
- ISC event: 1326454
- USGS-ANSS: ComCat
- Local date: 29 November 1998
- Local time: 23:10 WITA
- Magnitude: 7.7 M_{w}
- Depth: 16.5 km (10 mi)
- Epicenter: 1.89°S 124.86°E
- Fault: Sorong Fault
- Type: Strike-slip
- Areas affected: Indonesia
- Total damage: $200 million
- Max. intensity: MMI IX (Violent)
- Landslides: Yes
- Aftershocks: Multiple
- Casualties: 41 dead, 171 injured, 8 missing

On 29 November, at 14:10 UTC, a magnitude 7.7 M_{w} earthquake struck off the southern coast of Taliabu Island Regency in North Maluku, Indonesia. At least 41 people were killed on the nearby islands and a tsunami was triggered. Several hundred homes, buildings and offices were damaged or destroyed.

== Earthquake ==
According to the Meteorology, Climatology, and Geophysical Agency (BMKG), the earthquake occurred due to shallow strike-slip faulting on the Sorong Fault. The United States Geological Survey (USGS) stated that it ruptured along a NNE–SSW striking fault. A finite fault modeled by the USGS indicated that the fault crosses through the middle of Taliabu Island. A maximum slip of 8.7 m (29 ft) occurred along areas of the fault where it crosses beneath the island. The earthquake had a maximum Modified Mercalli intensity of IX (Violent). Intensity VI (Strong) was felt on nearby Sulawesi. However, the maximum intensity by damage was only VII (Very strong).

=== Tsunami ===
Many inhabitants along the coast feared the arrival of a tsunami and evacuated their homes. A tsunami was not confirmed by the BMKG, adding that because the earthquake was of a strike-slip nature, a major tsunami was not expected. Inhabitants on the island reported a 2.75 m (9.0 ft) high wave on the coast.

== Impact ==
At least 34 people died, eight were missing and 153 were injured on the islands of Taliabu and Mangole. Many casualties and property damage were caused by landslides. At least 512 houses were destroyed and 760 others were damaged. The earthquake also damaged or destroyed nine churches, 17 schools, 12 mosques and 14 government offices. On the island of Sulawesi, seven people were killed, 18 were injured and there was some damage to buildings in the city of Manado. Most of the fatalities were from Mangole Island, where buildings, homes and mosques, mostly constructed of Timber wood were destroyed or damaged. Landslides also reportedly destroyed a dock.

== See also ==
- List of earthquakes in 1998
- List of earthquakes in Indonesia
