= List of earthquakes in 1998 =

Earthquakes in 1998
Approximate epicenters of notable earthquakes in 1998
- 4.0–5.9 magnitude
- 6.0–6.9 magnitude
- 7.0–7.9 magnitude
- 8.0+ magnitude
- Strongest: 8.1 M_{w} Antarctica
- Deadliest: 6.6 M_{w} Afghanistan; 4,500 deaths
- Total fatalities: 9,934

Number by magnitude
- 9.0+: 0
- 8.0–8.9: 1
- 7.0–7.9: 11
- 6.0–6.9: 204

This is a list of earthquakes in 1998. Only earthquakes of magnitude 6 or above are included, unless they result in damage or casualties, or are notable for some other reason. All dates are listed according to UTC time. Maximum intensities are indicated on the Modified Mercalli intensity scale, and all data are sourced from the United States Geological Survey.

== By death toll ==
Rank	Magnitude	Death toll	Location	MMI	Depth (km)	Date	Event
1	6.6	4,500	Afghanistan, Hindu Kush	VIII (Severe)	30.0	May 30	May 1998 Afghanistan earthquake
2	7.0	2,700	Papua New Guinea, Aitape offshore	VIII (Severe)	10.0	July 17	1998 Papua New Guinea earthquake
3	5.9	2,323	Afghanistan, Hindu Kush	VIII (Severe)	33.0	February 4	February 1998 Afghanistan earthquake
4	6.3	145	Turkey, Adana	IX (Violent)	33.0	June 27	1998 Adana–Ceyhan earthquake
5	6.6	105	Bolivia, Cochabamba	VIII (Severe)	24.0	May 22	1998 Aiquile earthquake
6	5.7	70	China, Inner Mongolia	VIII (Severe)	30.3	January 10	1998 Zhangbei–Shanyi earthquake
7	7.7	41	Indonesia, North Maluku offshore	IX (Violent)	33.0	November 29	1998 North Maluku earthquake
8	5.8	12	Iran, Qayen	VIII (Severe)	33.0	April 10	-
9	6.2	10	Portugal, Azores Islands offshore	VIII (Severe)	10.0	July 9	1998 Azores Islands earthquake

At least 10 dead.

== By magnitude ==
Rank	Magnitude	Death toll	Location	MMI	Depth (km)	Date
1	8.1	0	Antarctica, Balleny Islands offshore	I (Not felt)	10.0	March 25
2	7.7	41	Indonesia, North Maluku offshore	IX (Violent)	33.0	November 29
3	7.5	0	Japan, Ishigaki offshore	V (Moderate)	33.0	May 3
3	7.5	0	New Caledonia, Loyalty Islands offshore	I (Not felt)	100.6	January 4
5	7.2	0	Fiji, Levuka offshore	III (Weak)	537.2	March 29
5	7.2	3	Ecuador, Bahía de Caráquez	X (Extreme)	33.0	August 4
7	7.1	1	Chile, Antofagasta	VIII (Severe)	42.0	January 30
7	7.1	0	Japan, Bonin Islands offshore	IV (Light)	440.5	August 20
9	7.0	2,700	Papua New Guinea, Aitape offshore	VIII (Severe)	10.0	July 17
9	7.0	0	Solomon Islands, Lata offshore	VII (Very strong)	110.2	July 16
9	7.0	0	Indonesia, Sumatra offshore	VIII (Severe)	55.7	April 1
9	7.0	0	Indonesia, Banda Sea offshore	VIII (Severe)	33.0	November 9

== By month ==
=== January ===
January
- Strongest: 7.5 M_{w} New Caledonia
- Deadliest: 5.7 M_{w} China; 70 deaths
- Total fatalities: 71

Number by magnitude
- 8.0–8.9: 0
- 7.0–7.9: 2
- 6.0–6.9: 6

Date	Country and location	M_{w}	Depth (km)	MMI	Notes	Casualties	
Date	Country and location	M_{w}	Depth (km)	MMI	Notes	Dead	Injured
4	New Caledonia, Loyalty Islands offshore	7.5	100.6	I	-	-	-
10	China, Inner Mongolia	5.7	30.3	VIII	Further information: 1998 Zhangbei–Shanyi earthquake	70	11,500
10	Peru, Madre De Dios	6.4	33.0	IX	-	-	-
10	Guatemala, Suchitepequez	6.6	33.0	VII	Twenty-four people injured in Guatemala and three in El Salvador. Several homes destroyed in Solola; some buildings damaged, landslides and power outages in Quezaltenango and San Marcos Departments.	-	27
12	Chile, Coquimbo	6.6	34.8	VIII	-	-	-
12	Fiji Region offshore	6.7	23.4	VI	An example of a Doublet earthquake	-	-
14	Fiji Region offshore	6.6	33.0	V	An example of a Doublet earthquake	-	-
27	Fiji Islands offshore	6.5	610.1	I	-	-	-
30	Chile, Antofagasta	7.1	42.0	VIII	One person died from a heart attack and a few poorly constructed buildings suffered minor damage in Antofagasta.	1	-

=== February ===
February
- Strongest: 6.8 M_{w} Iceland
- Deadliest: 5.9 M_{w} Afghanistan; 2,323 deaths
- Total fatalities: 2,324

Number by magnitude
- 8.0–8.9: 0
- 7.0–7.9: 0
- 6.0–6.9: 4

Date	Country and location	M_{w}	Depth (km)	MMI	Notes	Casualties	
Date	Country and location	M_{w}	Depth (km)	MMI	Notes	Dead	Injured
3	Mexico, Oaxaca	6.4	33.0	VIII	Moderate damage in San Agustin.	-	-
4	Afghanistan, Hindu Kush region	5.9	30.0	VIII	Further information: February 1998 Afghanistan earthquake	2,323	818
11	Philippines, Leyte	5.5	56.8	IV	Six people injured, a fishing pier destroyed, 11 buildings damaged, roads cracked and water pipes damaged at Sogod.	-	6
16	Iceland, Reykjanes Ridge offshore	6.8	10.0	I	-	-	-
19	Indonesia, Maluku offshore	6.5	33.0	VIII	-	-	-
20	Afghanistan, Hindu Kush region	6.4	235.6	IV	One person killed and 11 injured in Pakistan. An earthquake-induced avalanche destroyed 35 houses, including a mosque, left 300 people homeless and killed several dozen livestock in Kashmir.	1	11

=== March ===
March
- Strongest: 8.1 M_{w} Antarctica
- Deadliest: 6.6 M_{w} Iran; 5 deaths
- Total fatalities: 6

Number by magnitude
- 8.0–8.9: 1
- 7.0–7.9: 1
- 6.0–6.9: 4

Date	Country and location	M_{w}	Depth (km)	MMI	Notes	Casualties	
Date	Country and location	M_{w}	Depth (km)	MMI	Notes	Dead	Injured
3	Guatemala region	6.1	62.8	VII	Landslides blocked some highways and electrical cables damaged in Nahuala.	-	-
14	Iran, Kerman	6.6	9.0	IX	Five people Killed, 50 injured, 10,000 homeless, 2,000 houses damaged or destroyed and 1,200 livestock killed in Golbaf.	5	50
19	China, Xinjiang	5.6	33.0	VII	400 homes destroyed and some livestock were killed in the epicentral area.	-	-
20	New Zealand, Auckland Islands offshore	6.7	10.0	I	-	-	-
25	Antarctica, Balleny Islands offshore	8.1	10.0	I	The 1998 Balleny Islands earthquake is believed to be the largest instrumentally recorded earthquake in this area to date, and the largest earthquake in 1998. A tsunami was observed with heights of 1 cm in southern Australia.	-	-
25	Australia region offshore	6.4	10.0	I	-	-	-
26	Italy, Assisi	5.4	10.0	VII	One person died from a heart attack and several buildings damaged in the epicentral area.	1	-
29	Fiji, Levuka offshore	7.2	537.2	III	-	-	-

=== April ===
April
- Strongest: 7.0 M_{w} Indonesia
- Deadliest: 5.8 M_{w} Iran; 12 deaths
- Total fatalities: 13

Number by magnitude
- 8.0–8.9: 0
- 7.0–7.9: 1
- 6.0–6.9: 3

Date	Country and location	M_{w}	Depth (km)	MMI	Notes	Casualties	
Date	Country and location	M_{w}	Depth (km)	MMI	Notes	Dead	Injured
1	Indonesia, Mentawai Islands Offshore	7.0	55.7	VIII	-	-	-
1	Chile, Los Lagos offshore	6.7	9.0	V	-	-	-
3	Italy, Assisi	5.2	10.0	VII	Five people injured and 300 houses damaged or destroyed in Gualdo.	-	5
3	Peru, Ucayali	6.6	164.6	V	-	-	-
4	Turkey, Afyon	5.3	10.0	VI	Some minor damage occurred in the Afyon area.	-	-
10	Iran, Qayen	5.8	33.0	VIII	At least 12 people killed, 10 injured and more than 600 homes severely damaged in the Birjand-Gonabad area.	12	10
12	Slovenia, Tolmin	5.6	10.0	VIII	One person died of a heart attack at Bovec. Landslides and damaged buildings left 700 people homeless. Some damage in Austria.	1	-
13	Turkey, Bingöl	5.3	33.0	VII	Eleven people were injured and several buildings damaged or destroyed at Karliova.	-	11
20	Mexico, Guerrero	6.0	67.3	V	-	-	-

=== May ===
May
- Strongest: 7.5 M_{w} Japan
- Deadliest: 6.6 M_{w} Afghanistan; 4,500 deaths
- Total fatalities: 4,605

Number by magnitude
- 8.0–8.9: 0
- 7.0–7.9: 1
- 6.0–6.9: 4

Date	Country and location	M_{w}	Depth (km)	MMI	Notes	Casualties	
Date	Country and location	M_{w}	Depth (km)	MMI	Notes	Dead	Injured
3	Japan, Ryuku Islands offshore	7.5	33.0	V	A minor local tsunami was generated with recorded wave heights of 0.04 m on Ishigaki.	-	-
13	Papua New Guinea, New Britain	6.6	61.4	VIII	Minor damage in the Kokopo area.	-	-
16	Fiji Islands offshore	6.9	586.1	I	-	-	-
22	Bolivia, Cochabamba	6.6	24.0	VIII	Further information: 1998 Aiquile earthquake	105	150
28	Egypt, Mediterranean Sea offshore	5.5	10.0	VI	One person injured in Cairo.	-	1
28	China, Xinjiang	5.6	33.0	VII	Twenty-eight people injured, more than 2,000 buildings destroyed, an additional 3,000 damaged and 5,000 head of cattle killed in Xinjiang.	-	28
30	Afghanistan, Badakhshan Province	6.6	30.0	VIII	Main article: May 1998 Afghanistan earthquake	4,500	10,001

=== June ===
June
- Strongest: 6.4 M_{w} Russia
- Deadliest: 6.3 M_{w} Turkey; 145 deaths
- Total fatalities: 145

Number by magnitude
- 8.0–8.9: 0
- 7.0–7.9: 0
- 6.0–6.9: 5

Date	Country and location	M_{w}	Depth (km)	MMI	Notes	Casualties	
Date	Country and location	M_{w}	Depth (km)	MMI	Notes	Dead	Injured
1	Russia, Kamchatka offshore	6.4	43.7	VII	-	-	-
7	Mexico, Chiapas	6.3	86.6	VI	-	-	-
18	United Kingdom, Ascension Island region offshore	6.3	10.0	I	-	-	-
27	Turkey, Adana	6.3	33.0	IX	The 1998 Adana–Ceyhan earthquake killed at least 145 people, left 1,500 people injured and many thousands homeless.	145	1,500
29	Australia, Macquarie Island offshore	6.3	10.0	I	-	-	-

=== July ===
July
- Strongest: 7.0 M_{w} Solomon Islands; 7.0 M_{w} Papua New Guinea
- Deadliest: 7.0 M_{w} Papua New Guinea; 2,700 deaths
- Total fatalities: 2,717

Number by magnitude
- 8.0–8.9: 0
- 7.0–7.9: 2
- 6.0–6.9: 5

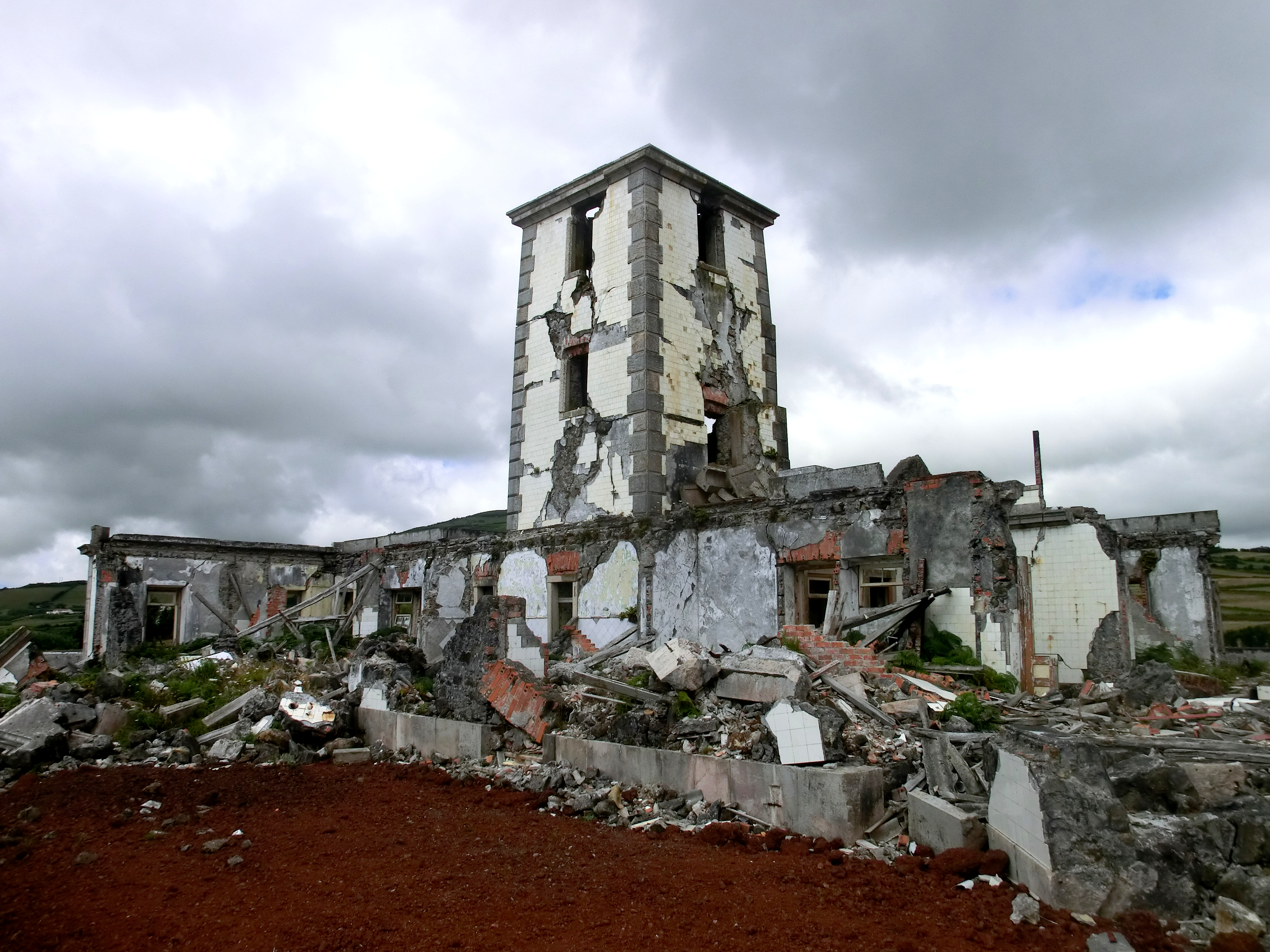
The Ribeirinha lighthouse after the earthquake in Portugal.

Date	Country and location	M_{w}	Depth (km)	MMI	Notes	Casualties	
Date	Country and location	M_{w}	Depth (km)	MMI	Notes	Dead	Injured
4	Turkey, Adana	5.4	33.0	VII	At least 1,000 people injured and one building collapsed in Adana.	-	1,000
9	Portugal, Azores Islands offshore	6.2	10.0	VIII	Further information: 1998 Azores Islands earthquake	10	100
9	Azerbaijan region	6.0	26.0	VII	Extensive damage occurred in Astara and Yardimli.	-	-
9	New Zealand, Kermadec Islands offshore	6.9	129.5	I	-	-	-
16	Solomon Islands, Nendo offshore	7.0	110.2	VII	-	-	-
17	Taiwan, Nantou County	5.7	12.6	VIII	Five people killed, 27 others injured, damage and landslides in Chiayi County.	5	27
17	Papua New Guinea, Aitape offshore	7.0	10.0	VIII	Further information: 1998 Papua New Guinea earthquake	2,700	Thousands
28	China, Xinjiang	5.2	33.0	VI	Several people injured and 19 houses collapsed in Baicheng County.	-	Several
29	Chile, Valparaíso	6.4	51.1	VI	Two people died from heart attacks in Santiago and four miners injured at the Boton de Oro mine.	2	4
29	Indonesia, Papua	6.7	33.0	VIII	-	-	-

=== August ===
August
- Strongest: 7.2 M_{w} Ecuador
- Deadliest: 7.2 M_{w} Ecuador; 6.4 M_{w} China 3 deaths
- Total fatalities: 6

Number by magnitude
- 8.0–8.9: 0
- 7.0–7.9: 2
- 6.0–6.9: 3

Date	Country and location	M_{w}	Depth (km)	MMI	Notes	Casualties	
Date	Country and location	M_{w}	Depth (km)	MMI	Notes	Dead	Injured
2	China, Xinjiang	5.6	10.0	VIII	Two people injured and several homes destroyed in Jiashi County.	-	2
4	Iran, Khorasan province	5.3	33.0	V	Some damage occurred in Khorasan province.	-	-
4	Ecuador, Manabi	7.2	33.0	X	Further information: 1998 Bahía de Caráquez earthquake	3	40
12	United States, California	5.1	8.8	VII	Two people injured in Santa Cruz County. Some damage to a church at San Juan Bautista and minor cracking of highway 101 in San Benito County.	-	2
15	Italy, Lazio	4.8	10.0	VII	Some damage in Antrodoco	-	-
15	Japan, Nagano Prefecture	5.5	10.0	VII	Damage due to a landslide in Gifu Prefecture.	-	-
20	Japan, Bonin Islands offshore	7.1	440.5	IV	-	-	-
20	United States, Alaska, Aleutian Islands offshore	6.3	33.0	I	-	-	-
23	Nicaragua, Chinandega offshore	6.7	54.6	V	-	-	
27	China, Xinjiang	6.4	10.0	VIII	Three people killed, seven injured, more than 3,600 houses destroyed, 18,771 damaged and 159 livestock killed in Jiashi County.	3	7
28	Japan, Tokyo offshore	5.4	75.9	V	Two people were slightly injured in the Tokyo-Yokohama area.	-	2

=== September ===
September
- Strongest: 6.8 M_{w} Philippines
- Deadliest: 6.6 M_{w} Indonesia; 5.5 M_{w} FR Yugoslavia 1 death
- Total fatalities: 2

Number by magnitude
- 8.0–8.9: 0
- 7.0–7.9: 0
- 6.0–6.9: 4

Date	Country and location	M_{w}	Depth (km)	MMI	Notes	Casualties	
Date	Country and location	M_{w}	Depth (km)	MMI	Notes	Dead	Injured
2	Philippines, Mindanao offshore	6.8	50.0	VI	Objects fell from shelves in General Santos.	-	-
3	Japan, Iwate	5.9	38.1	VIII	Eleven people injured and landslides blocked two roads in the epicentral area.	-	11
3	Chile, Coquimbo offshore	6.6	27.0	VIII	Two people injured in La Serena.	-	2
15	Japan, Miyagi	5.1	50.4	VII	One person injured in Miyagi.	-	1
21	Vanuatu, Torba offshore	6.4	33.0	VII	-	-	-
24	Mongolia, Dundgovi	5.6	33.0	VII	Many homes damaged in Mandalgovi.	-	-
28	Indonesia, Java	6.6	151.6	VII	One person killed, 38 homes destroyed and 62 others damaged in Malang.	1	-
29	FR Yugoslavia	5.5	10.0	VIII	Further information: 1998 Mionica earthquake	1	17
30	Albania, Kukës	5.3	10.0	VI	700 houses damaged in the epicentral area.	-	-

=== October ===
October
- Strongest: 6.6 M_{w} Indonesia
- Total fatalities: 0

Number by magnitude
- 8.0–8.9: 0
- 7.0–7.9: 0
- 6.0–6.9: 2

Date	Country and location	M_{w}	Depth (km)	MMI	Notes	Casualties	
Date	Country and location	M_{w}	Depth (km)	MMI	Notes	Dead	Injured
5	Iran, Ilam	5.4	38.6	IV	At least 100 houses damaged in the Darreh Shahr area	-	-
8	Peru, Arequipa	6.2	136.2	IV	Minor damage in Arequipa.	-	-
10	Indonesia, Sulawesi	5.9	33.0	VIII	Many homes damaged in Donggala.	-	-
10	Indonesia, Sulawesi	6.0	33.0	VIII	Many homes damaged in Donggala.	-	-
18	Nicaragua, Masaya	4.4	10.0	VI	Three people injured, two homes destroyed and 45 severely damaged in Ticuantepe.	-	3
26	China, Yunnan	4.7	10.0	VI	28 people injured and 700 houses damaged in Lijiang.	-	28
28	Indonesia, Sulawesi offshore	6.6	10.0	VI	-	-	

=== November ===
November
- Strongest: 7.7 M_{w} Indonesia
- Deadliest: 7.7 M_{w} Indonesia; 41 deaths
- Total fatalities: 51

Number by magnitude
- 8.0–8.9: 0
- 7.0–7.9: 2
- 6.0–6.9: 2

Date	Country and location	M_{w}	Depth (km)	MMI	Notes	Casualties	
Date	Country and location	M_{w}	Depth (km)	MMI	Notes	Dead	Injured
8	Indonesia, East Nusa Tenggara offshore	6.4	33.0	VI	-	-	-
9	Indonesia, East Timor offshore	6.7	33.0	VIII	-	-	-
9	Indonesia, East Timor offshore	7.0	33.0	VIII	-	-	-
13	Iran, Fars	5.4	33.0	VII	Five people killed, 105 others injured and 850 houses damaged by the earthquake and landslides.	5	105
18	Iran, Kerman	5.4	33.0	V	Damage to buildings in Kerman.	-	-
19	China, Yunnan	5.6	33.0	VIII	Five people killed, 1,543 others injured and over 28,000 houses damaged in the epicentral area.	5	1,543
29	Indonesia, North Maluku offshore	7.7	33.0	IX	41 people were killed and 171 people were injured in the 1998 North Maluku earthquake, with over 500 homes destroyed and over 700 others damaged.	41	171

=== December ===
December
- Strongest: 6.8 M_{w} Tonga
- Deadliest: 5.7 M_{w} Afghanistan; 5 deaths
- Total fatalities: 5

Number by magnitude
- 8.0–8.9: 0
- 7.0–7.9: 0
- 6.0–6.9: 2

Date	Country and location	M_{w}	Depth (km)	MMI	Notes	Casualties	
Date	Country and location	M_{w}	Depth (km)	MMI	Notes	Dead	Injured
1	China, Yunnan	4.5	10.0	V	84 people injured and 21,400 houses damaged, along with 472 schools.	-	84
6	Indonesia, Sulawesi offshore	6.6	33.0	VI	-	-	-
11	Afghanistan, Hindu Kush	5.7	222.5	III	Five people killed and seven others injured in Kabul.	5	7
27	Tonga offshore	6.8	144.3	V	-	-	-

== See also ==
- Lists of 20th-century earthquakes
- Lists of earthquakes by year
