= 1998 Zhangbei–Shangyi earthquake =

Earthquake in China

- Location within China
- UTC time: 1998-01-10 03:50:41
- ISC event: 1063412
- USGS-ANSS: ComCat
- Local date: 10 January 1998
- Local time: 11:50:41 CST
- Magnitude: 5.7 M_{wc} 6.2 M_{s}
- Depth: 14.1 km (8.8 mi)
- Epicenter: 41.083°N 114.500°E
- Type: Reverse
- Areas affected: China
- Total damage: >70,000 homes damaged or destroyed
- Max. intensity: CSIS VIII
- Casualties: 70 dead, 11,500 injured, 44,000 families homeless

The 1998 Zhangbei–Shangyi earthquake occurred at 11:50 local time on 10 January with a moment magnitude of 5.7 at a depth of 14.1 km. It struck the province of Hebei in Zhangjiakou. At least 70 people died, 11,500 were injured and a further 44,000 families were homeless in the wake of the event. Damage was reported in the town of Zhangbei, Hebei Province, as well as to sections of the Great Wall of China.

== Earthquake ==
According to the United States Geological Survey, the earthquake occurred as a result of shallow oblique-reverse faulting. The rupture likely occurred along a north northeast-south southwest striking, east-northeast dipping fault. Coseismic slip mainly occurred in the shallowest 8 km of the fault while the maximum slip is estimated at 0.55 m at depths of 4 to 5 km on the fault plane. No surface ruptures were observed as slip at the surface only measured 0.03 m; too small for any observable ground displacements. The absence of any surface ruptures could classify the event as a blind thrust earthquake.

== Impact ==
An area measuring 135 km^{2} was assigned a maximum intensity of VIII on the China seismic intensity scale. According to local officials, there were a total of 49 deaths (some sources suggest 70), and 11,439 injured, 362 of them seriously. Of the 1,824 villages across 37 townships in 19 counties affected, 696 were impacted with serious results. The International Federation of Red Cross and Red Crescent Societies on January 20, stated that 12,000 people were injured, including over 1,200 in serious condition. Over 400,000 homes were severely damaged or destroyed, leaving 44,000 homeless. In Beijing, approximately 225.3 km (140.0 mi) southeast of the epicenter, office and apartment towers swayed.

== Affermath ==
Medical personnel and soldiers brought blankets and relief supplies to the affected villages. According to New China News Agency, citing officials, all homeless people were sheltered. Quilt tents were constructed by resque workers in affected villages. Evening television programs in Beijing were interrupted by broadcast of the earthquake. They also reassured the city's population was safe.

== See also ==
- List of earthquakes in 1998
- List of earthquakes in China
