= Besna Kobila =

Mountain in Serbia

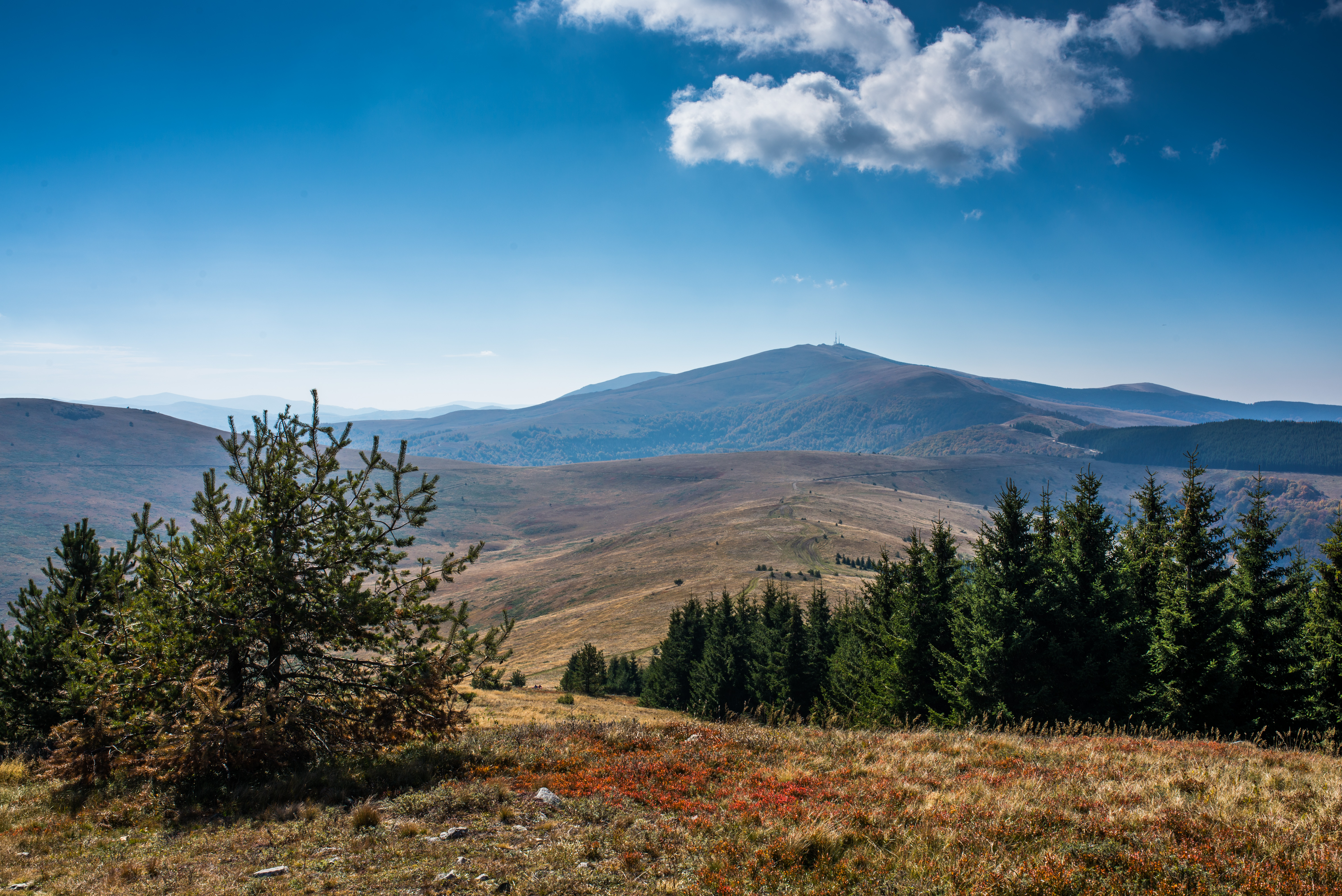

Highest point
- Elevation: 1,923 m (6,309 ft)
- Coordinates: 42°31′46″N 22°13′50″E

Geography
- Location within Serbia
- Location: Southern Serbia
- Parent range: Rhodope Mountains

Besna Kobila (Serbian Cyrillic: Бесна Кобила, pronounced [bɛ̂ːsnaː kɔ̌bila], lit. "Mad Mare") is a mountain in southern Serbia, 35 km to the east of the city of Vranje. Its eponymous highest peak has an elevation of 1,923 m. The mountain is known for its stormy weather, so the best months for climbing are during the warmer part of the year.

Besna Kobila used to have 9 months of snow a year, making it suitable for ski tourism. There is only the mountain chalet, which has been used for accommodation of students. The "skyway" (nebeski put) – road running over the vast pastures on the highland – lies at the altitude of 1800 m and is suitable for mountain biking, safari bus and off-roading. There are ambitious plans to build a bigger ski center on the mountain, and the municipality is searching for foreign investors.

== Gallery ==
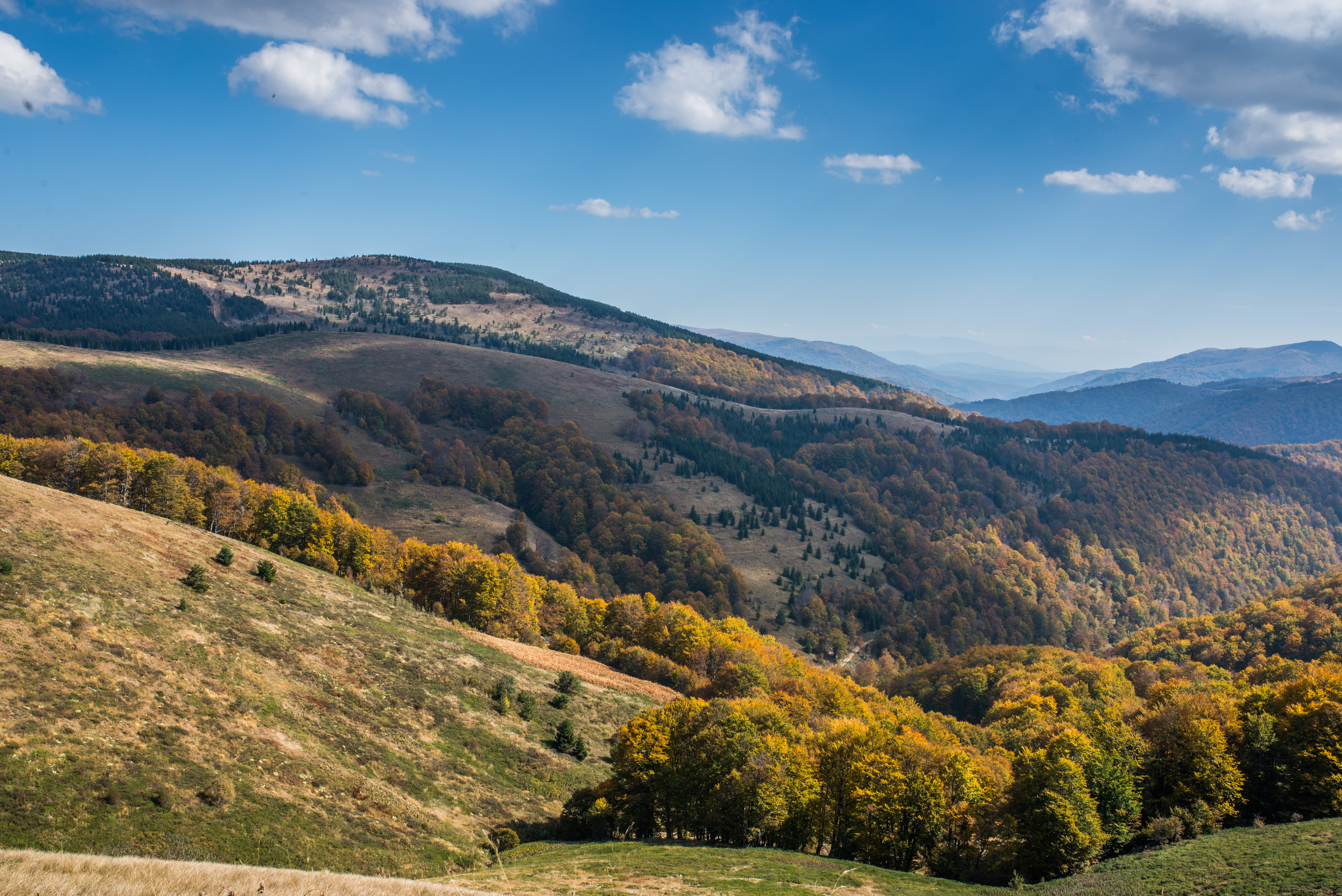

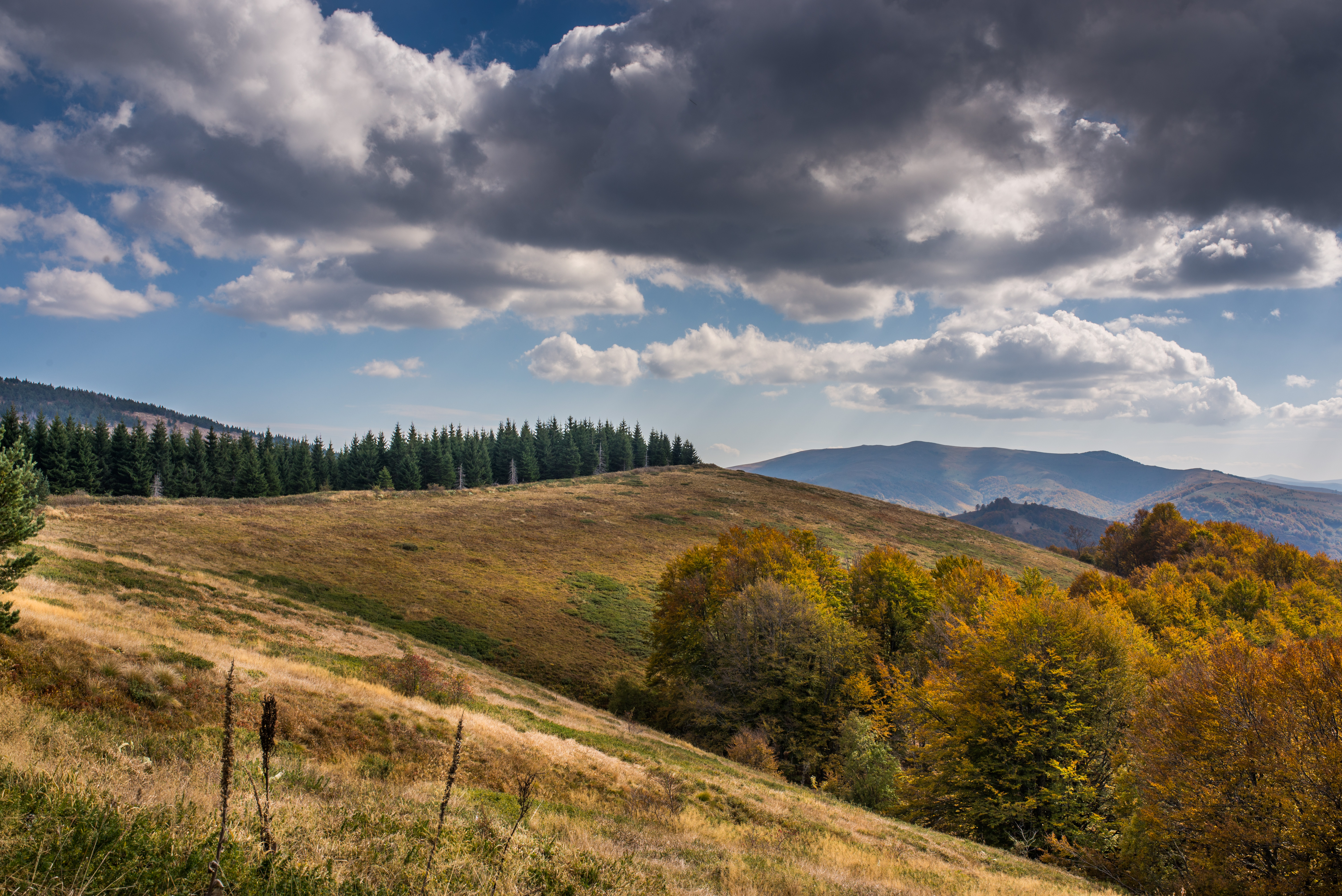

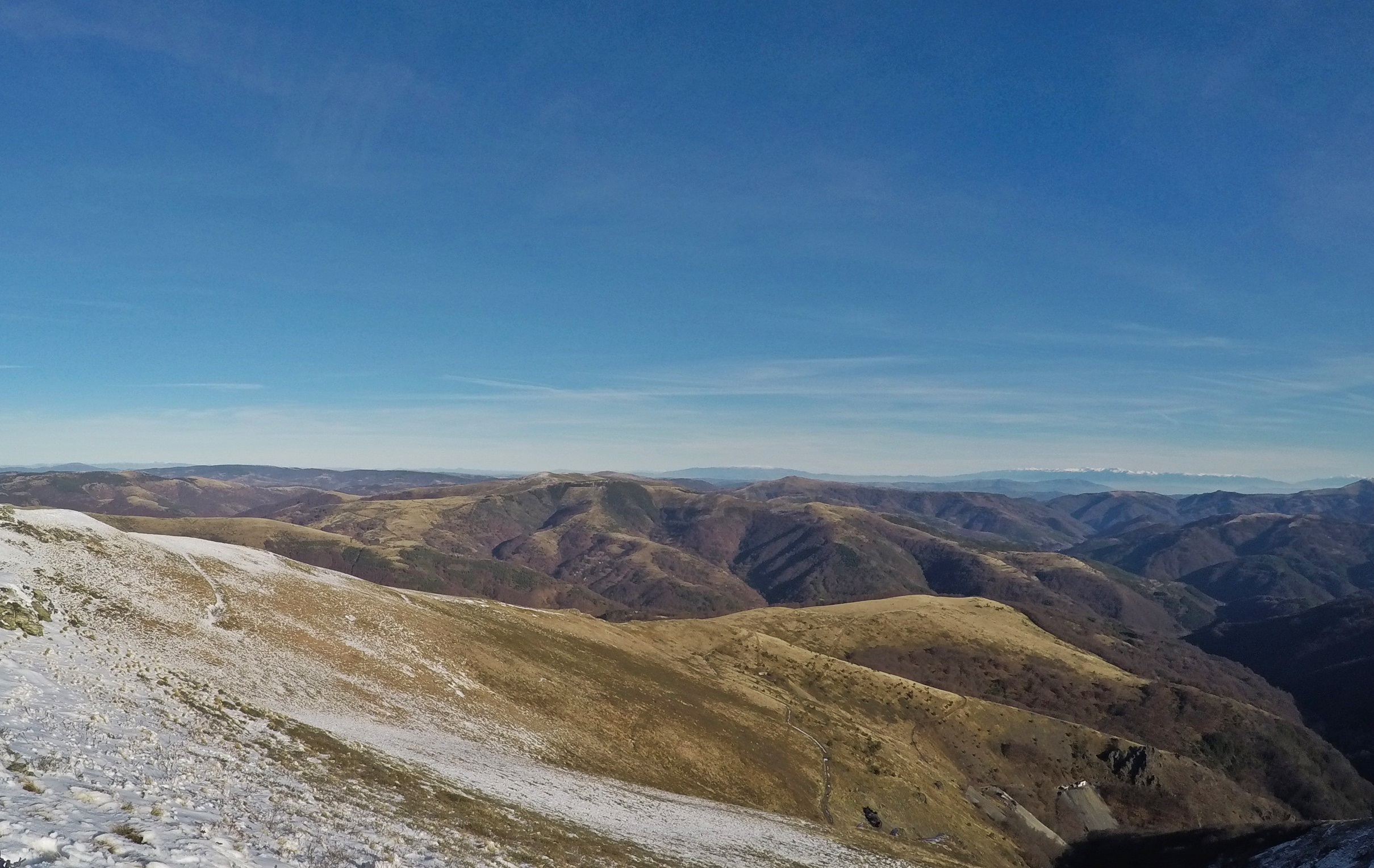

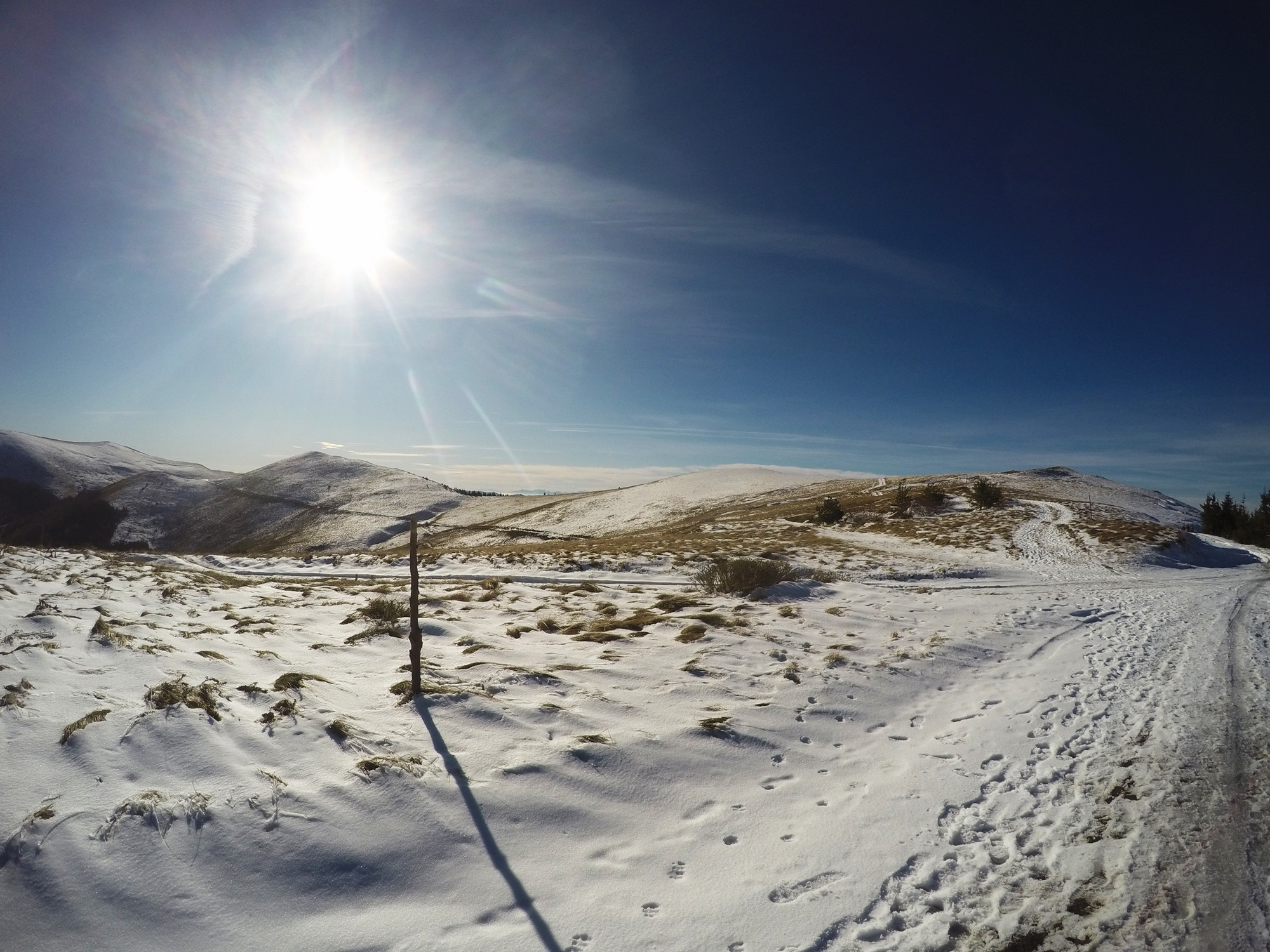

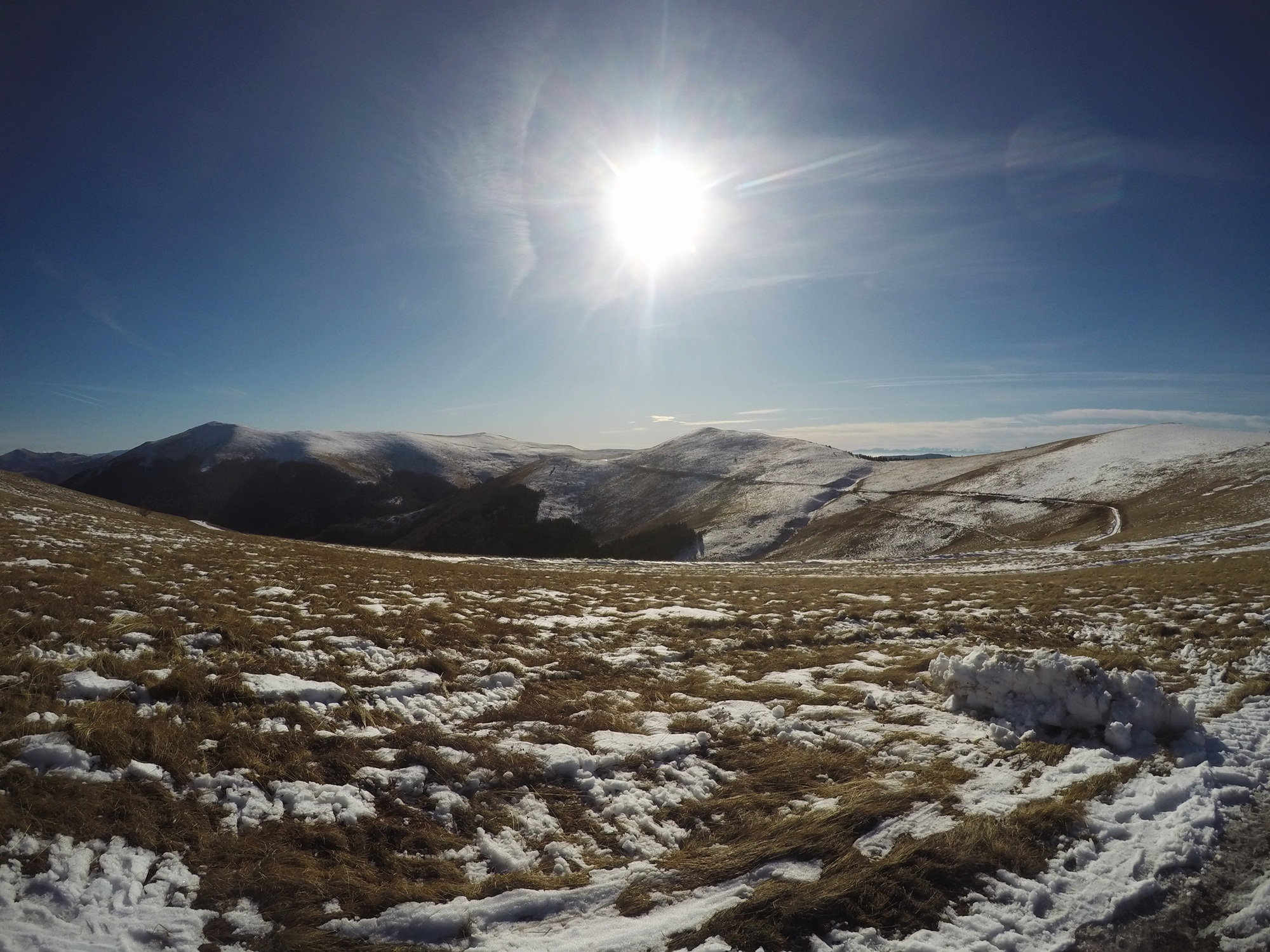

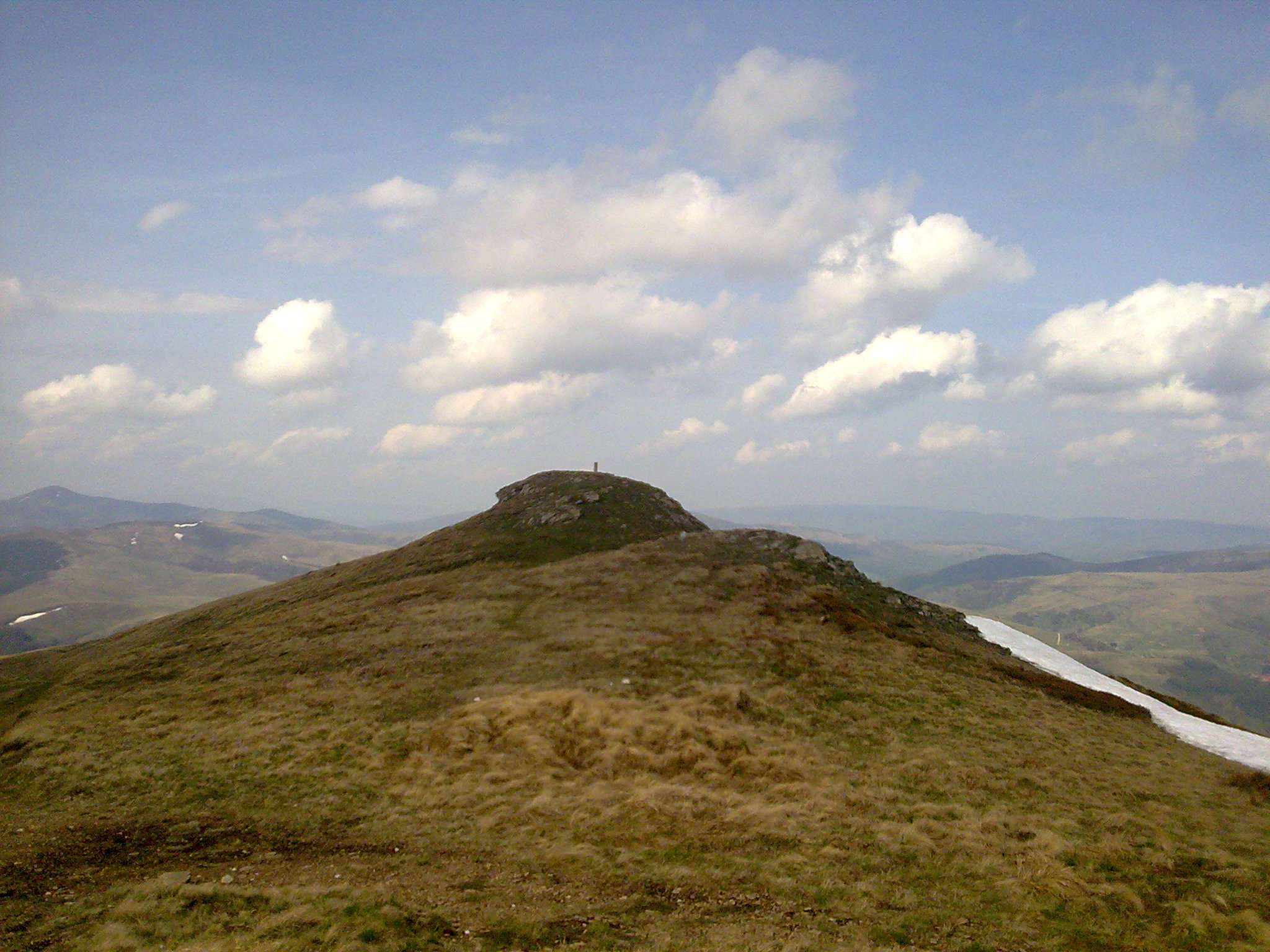

== See also ==
- List of mountains in Serbia
