= 1998 Mionica earthquake =

Earthquake in Serbia

- Location within Serbia
- UTC time: 1998-09-29 22:14:49
- ISC event: 1207590
- USGS-ANSS: ComCat
- Local date: 29 September 1998
- Local time: 23:14:49 CET
- Magnitude: 5.5 M_{w}
- Depth: 10 km (6.2 mi)
- Epicenter: 44.209°N 20.080°E
- Areas affected: Serbia
- Max. intensity: MMI VIII (Severe)
- Casualties: 1 dead, 17 injured

In the late evening of 29 September 1998, a 5.5 magnitude earthquake occurred near the town of Mionica in western Central Serbia. The epicentral area was near the village of Brežđe, where it had a maximum intensity of VIII on the Mercalli intensity scale. It was felt in Central Serbia, Vidin (Bulgaria), Sarajevo (Bosnia) and parts of Croatia, Hungary and Greece. One person died from a heart attack and 17 were injured. Some 60 schools (mostly in villages) were damaged.

== See also ==
- List of earthquakes in 1998
- List of earthquakes in Serbia
- 2010 Kraljevo earthquake
