= 2025 Afghanistan earthquake =

2025 Afghanistan earthquake may refer to:

- 2025 Kunar earthquake, 31 August
- 2025 Balkh earthquake, 3 November

== See also ==
- Afghanistan earthquake (disambiguation)
