= 2010 Kraljevo earthquake =

Earthquake in Serbia

2010 Serbia earthquake
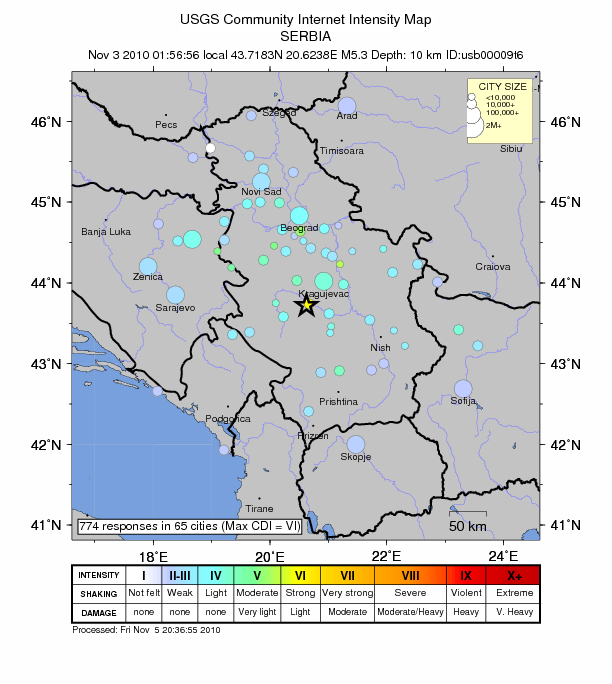
- UTC time: 2010-11-03 00:56:55
- ISC event: 15454325
- USGS-ANSS: ComCat
- Local date: November 3, 2010
- Local time: 01:56:55 CET
- Magnitude: 5.5 M_{wc}
- Depth: 0.9 km (0.6 mi) (ANSS); 13.1 km (8.1 mi) (GCMT)
- Epicenter: 43.76°N 20.73°E
- Areas affected: Serbia
- Max. intensity: MMI VI (Strong)
- Aftershocks: 4.3 M_{wr} Nov 4 at 21:09
- Casualties: 2 killed, 100+ injured

An earthquake of magnitude 5.5 and a maximum Mercalli intensity of VI (Strong) occurred on 3 November 2010 in central Serbia just several kilometers from the city of Kraljevo. The shock was felt across the country, including the capital Belgrade, and in neighboring countries. Two people were killed and over 100 suffered light injuries. There were 5,967 structures that sustained some damage, 1,551 declared unsafe for use and require repairment, and 138 were damaged beyond repair. There were more than 350 aftershocks, including a magnitude M_{wr} 4.3 earthquake on November 4.

== Background ==
The earthquake had magnitude of 5.3 and took place at 01:56 local time (00:56 UTC). The epicenter of the earthquake was located ten kilometers north of Kraljevo near the village of Vitanovac. Following the earthquake electricity, phone lines and water supply were interrupted in Kraljevo region. Emergency situation was declared throughout the region. Schools as well as several dozen other structures have been sealed until the inspection verifies them as safe for use. Most damage was done near the epicenter, where around 70% of buildings in the village of Vitanovac have suffered damage. The Government of Serbia released emergency aid for food and supplies and announced that the aid for reconstruction will be given from budget reserve as the emergency aid budget was already spent on flood recovering during the summer. Most of the damage was to the older structures.

A crack appeared on the northern facade of the 13th-century Žiča monastery. The Serbian government is seeking help from UNESCO for the recovery.

Two people were killed in the village of Grdica near Kraljevo. The victims, a couple aged 67, died in their home when the roof and a concrete slab fell over their bed.

The earthquake was strongly felt throughout the country, including the capital Belgrade, as well as in Bulgaria (damage was caused in Belogradchik) and Romania. The intensity was MM VI in Kraljevo and MM IV in Belgrade.

== See also ==
- List of earthquakes in 2010
- List of earthquakes in Serbia
- Geology of Serbia
