= May 1998 Afghanistan earthquake =

Severe earthquake centered in Takhar Province, Afghanistan

- Location within Afghanistan
- UTC time: 1998-05-30 06:22:28
- ISC event: 1109480
- USGS-ANSS: ComCat
- Local date: May 30, 1998
- Local time: 10:52:28
- Magnitude: 6.5 M_{w}
- Depth: 30 km (19 mi)
- Epicenter: 37.17°N 70.09°E
- Type: Strike-slip
- Areas affected: Afghanistan
- Max. intensity: MMI VIII (Severe)
- Casualties: 4,000–4,500 dead 10,000 injured

An earthquake occurred in northern Afghanistan on May 30, 1998, at 06:22 UTC in Takhar Province, with a moment magnitude of 6.5 and a maximum modified Mercalli intensity of VIII (Severe). At the time, the Afghan Civil War was underway; the affected area was controlled by the United Islamic Front for the Salvation of Afghanistan (the "Northern Alliance").

== Overview ==
This earthquake was the second large earthquake in the area in 1998 after another earthquake on February 4. Between 4,000 and 4,500 people died in Takhar and Badakhshan provinces. Nearly 7,000 families were affected, and it was estimated that 16,000 houses were destroyed or damaged. Approximately 45,000 people became homeless. More than 30 villages were destroyed, and another 70 were severely damaged. Several thousand animals were killed, and crops and infrastructure were destroyed.

Like many least developed nations, Afghanistan was ill-equipped to face this kind of natural disaster. The country had no forms of protection or hazard microzonation. Houses were mainly built of mud brick with shallow foundation. The villages were built on unstable slopes. Many villages were entirely buried due to the landslides. Aftershocks continued for a month. It was also felt at Mazar-e Sharif, Kabul, Andijan, Samarkand, Islamabad, Peshawar, Rawalpindi and Dushanbe.

== Relief efforts ==
Several problems appeared during the relief operation. The affected region was remote and lacked any modern telecommunication. The local customs prohibited male physicians from examining or speaking to women. There was no available accurate map of the affected region; however, this problem was mitigated as the pilots of the first Tajikistan helicopters had served with the Soviet Armed Forces in the area during the Soviet–Afghan War and were familiar with many of the villages. Relief efforts were also delayed because of blocked roads, bad weather, and political turmoil in the region.

Relief effort by several agencies in Afghanistan was administered from neighboring Pakistan, as many organizations had learned from previous experience not to base too many assets in Kabul or in any other city in Afghanistan. A sub-base for the relief efforts was established in Rostaq in Takhar Province near the Afghanistan-Tajikistan border, which, in spite of a lack of airfields, had open spaces for helicopter operations and a road link to Tajikistan. A worldwide appeal was made for helicopters to assist in the relief operations.

The United Nations (UN) and several non-governmental organizations (NGOs) were involved in the relief efforts of the affected area. A joint relief operation was mounted by the UN, the International Committee of the Red Cross (ICRC), the International Federation of Red Cross and Red Crescent Societies (IFRC), and a number of national and international NGOs.

== See also ==
- List of earthquakes in 1998
- List of earthquakes in Afghanistan
