= 2022 Afghanistan earthquake =

2022 Afghanistan earthquake may refer to:

- January 2022 Afghanistan earthquakes
- June 2022 Afghanistan earthquake
- September 2022 Afghanistan earthquake

== See also ==
- Afghanistan earthquake
