= List of earthquakes in 2022 =

Earthquakes in 2022
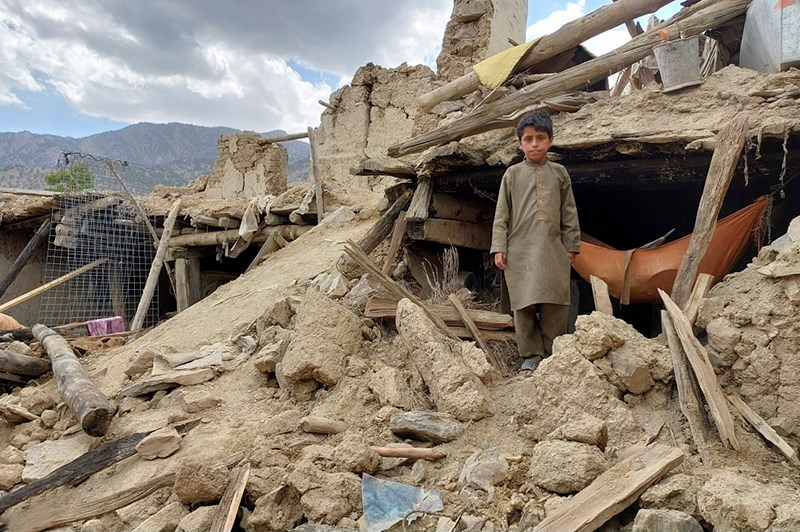
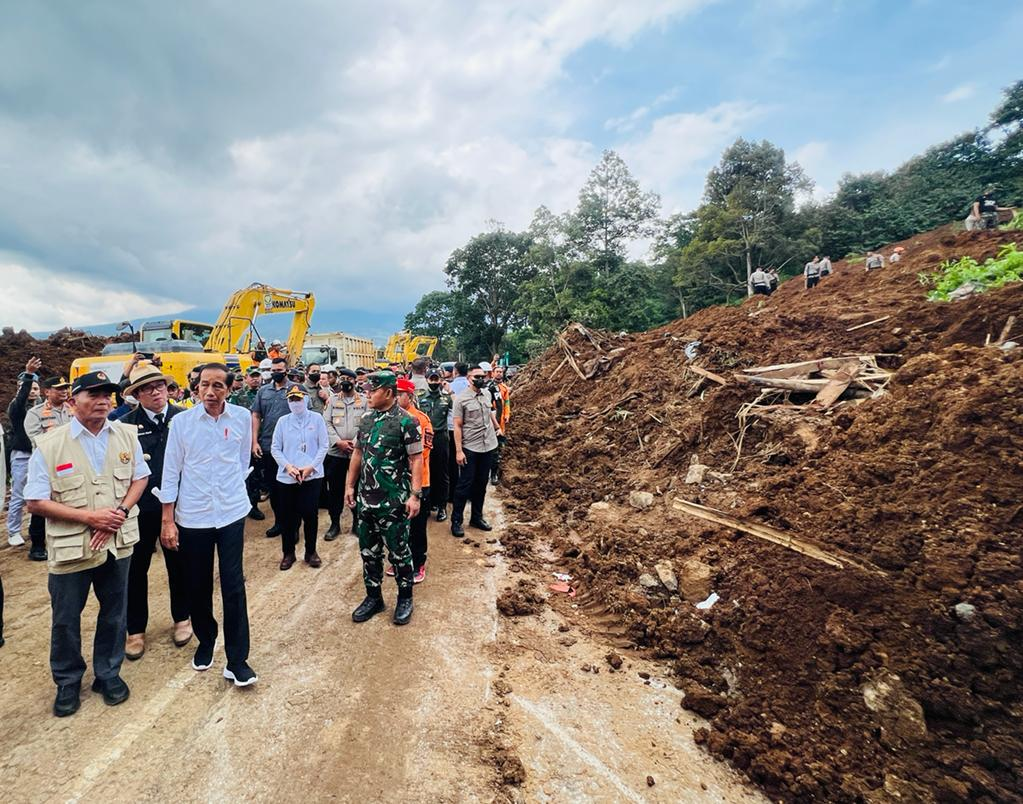
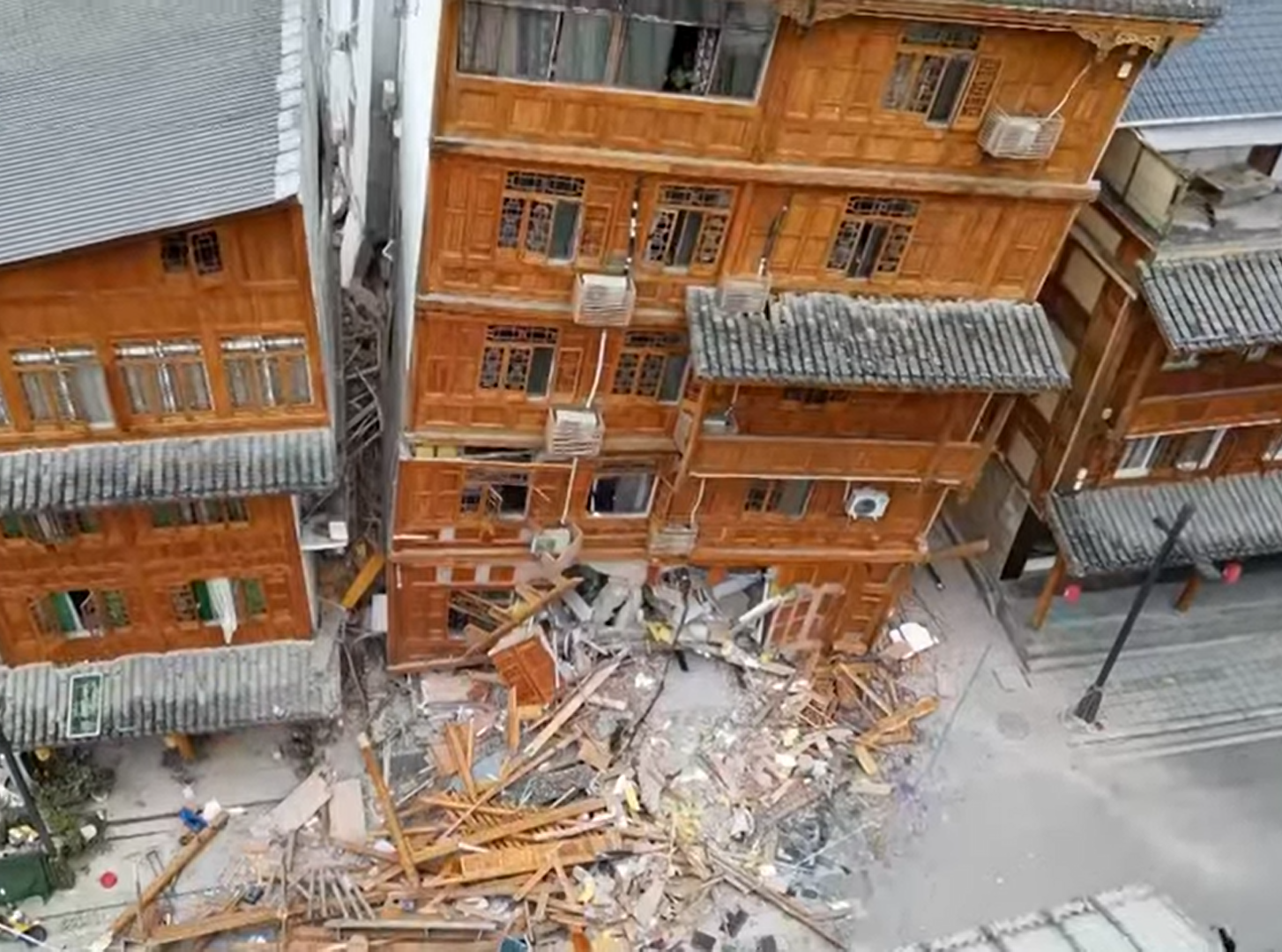
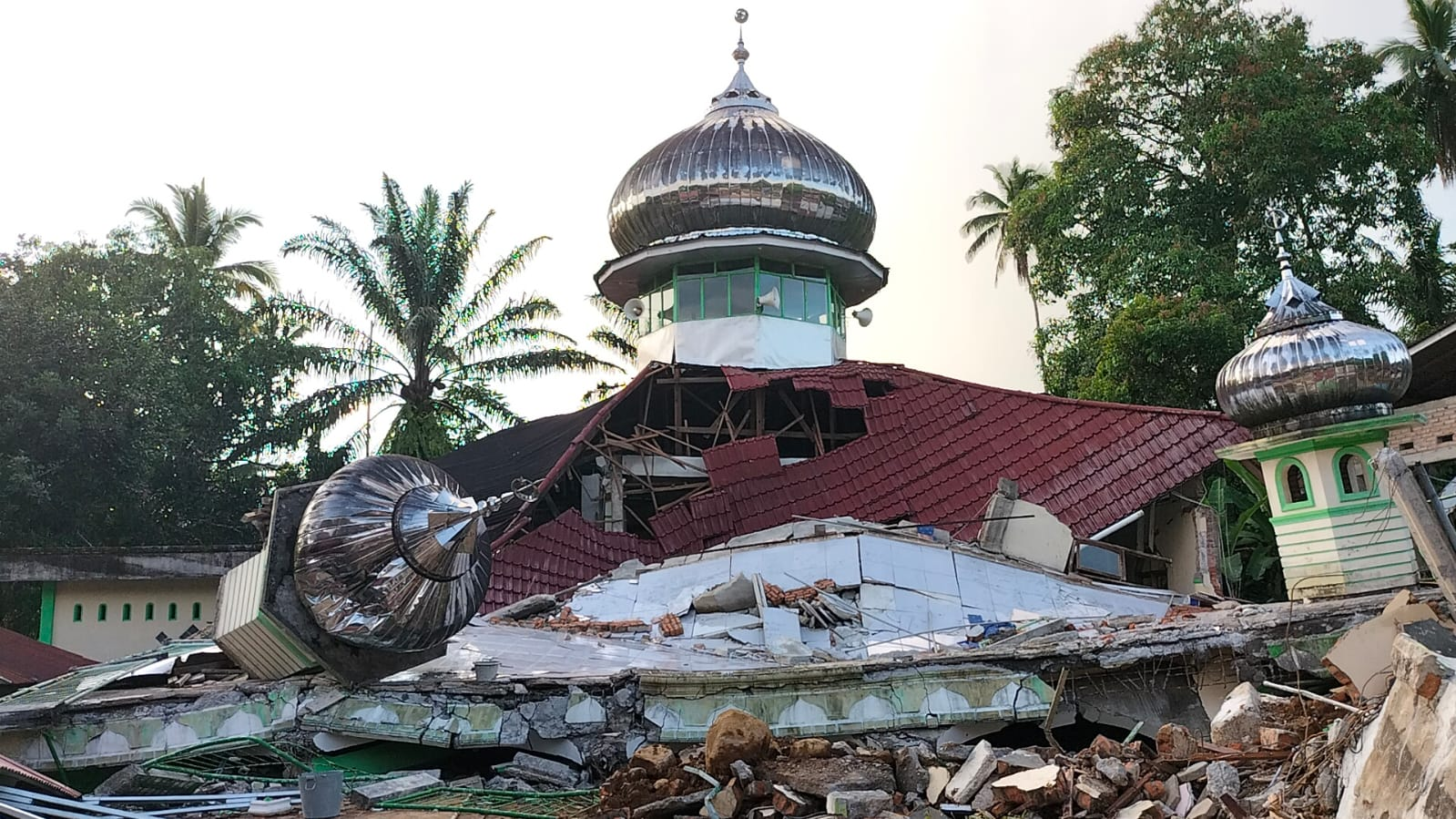
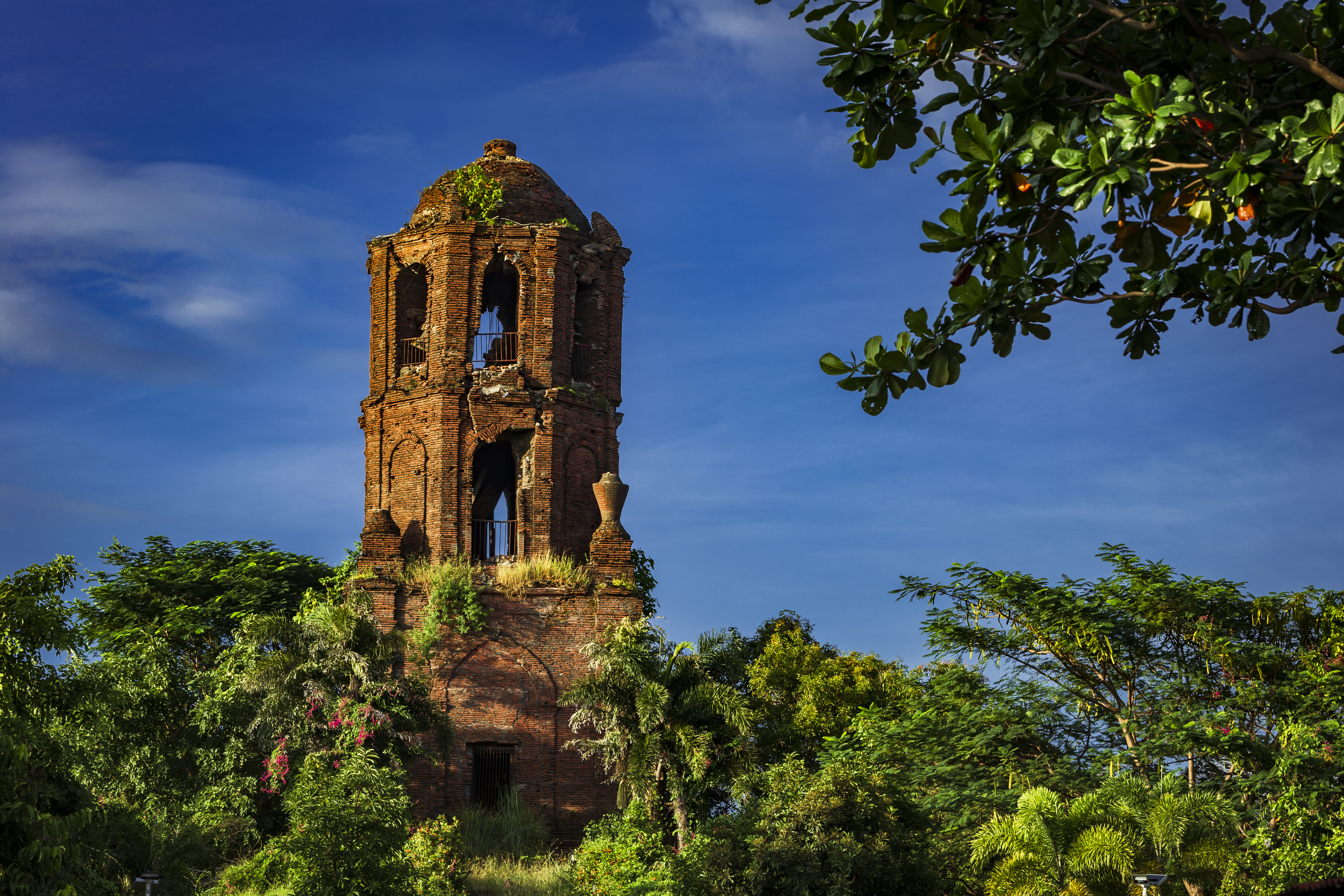
- From top, left to right: A house destroyed by the June 2022 Afghanistan earthquake • Joko Widodo visiting the site of a landslide triggered by the 2022 West Java earthquake • A collapsed hotel after the 2022 Luding earthquake • A mosque destroyed by the 2022 Sumatra earthquake • The old bell tower of the Bantay Church damaged by 2022 Luzon earthquake

Approximate epicenters of notable earthquakes in 2022
- 4.0–5.9 magnitude
- 6.0–6.9 magnitude
- 7.0–7.9 magnitude
- 8.0+ magnitude
- Strongest: 7.6 M_{w} Papua New Guinea; 7.6 M_{w} Mexico
- Deadliest: 6.0 M_{w} Afghanistan; 1,163 deaths
- Total fatalities: 1,777–2,077

Number by magnitude
- 9.0+: 0
- 8.0–8.9: 0
- 7.0–7.9: 11
- 6.0–6.9: 117
- 5.0–5.9: 1,603
- 4.0–4.9: 13,707

This is a list of earthquakes in 2022. Only earthquakes of magnitude 6 or above are included, unless they result in significant damage and/or casualties, or are notable for some other reason. All dates are listed according to UTC time. Maximum intensities are based on the Modified Mercalli intensity scale.

The year 2022 was moderately active for earthquakes, with eleven major events, the majority of them occurring in Oceania. Three deadly events occurred in Afghanistan, with the deadliest event of the year killing over 1,100 in the eastern part of the country near Pakistan. The largest earthquakes occurred in Papua New Guinea and Mexico, with both events measuring 7.6. Deadly events also struck Indonesia, China, Papua New Guinea, the Philippines and Poland.

== Compared to other years ==
Number of earthquakes worldwide for 2012–2022
Magnitude	2012	2013	2014	2015	2016	2017	2018	2019	2020	2021	2022
8.0–9.9	2	2	1	1	0	1	1	1	0	3	0
7.0–7.9	14	17	11	18	16	6	16	9	9	16	11
6.0–6.9	117	123	143	127	131	104	118	135	111	141	117
5.0–5.9	1,546	1,460	1,580	1,413	1,550	1,447	1,671	1,484	1,315	2,046	1,603
4.0–4.9	10,955	11,877	15,817	13,777	13,700	10,544	12,782	11,897	12,135	14,643	13,707
Total	12,635	13,480	17,552	15,336	15,397	12,102	14,589	13,530	13,572	16,849	15,438

Earthquakes in 2022 – M 5.0 or greater (map data)

== By death toll ==
Rank	Death toll	Magnitude	Location	MMI	Depth (km)	Date	Event
1	1,163	6.0	Afghanistan, Khost	IX (Violent)	4.0	22 June	June 2022 Afghanistan earthquake
2	335–635	5.6	Indonesia, West Java	VIII (Severe)	10.0	21 November	2022 West Java earthquake
3	93	6.6	China, Sichuan	IX (Violent)	12.0	5 September	2022 Luding earthquake
4	30	5.3	Afghanistan, Badghis	VI (Strong)	11.4	17 January	January 2022 Afghanistan earthquakes
5	27	6.1	Indonesia, West Sumatra	VIII (Severe)	4.9	25 February	2022 Sumatra earthquake
6	21	7.6	Papua New Guinea, Morobe	VIII (Severe)	116.0	10 September	2022 Papua New Guinea earthquake
7	18	5.1	Afghanistan, Kunar	VII (Very strong)	10.0	4 September	September 2022 Afghanistan earthquake
8	11	7.0	Philippines, Cordillera	VIII (Severe)	33.7	27 July	2022 Luzon earthquake
9	10	2.7	Poland, Silesian Voivodeship	V (Moderate)	5.0	23 April	—

Listed are earthquakes with at least 10 dead.

== By magnitude ==
Rank	Magnitude	Death toll	Location	MMI	Depth (km)	Date	Event
1	7.6	21	Papua New Guinea, Morobe	VIII (Severe)	116.0	10 September	2022 Papua New Guinea earthquake
1	7.6	2	Mexico, Michoacán	VIII (Severe)	26.9	19 September	2022 Michoacán earthquake
3	7.3	4	Japan, Fukushima offshore	VIII (Severe)	41.0	16 March	2022 Fukushima earthquake
3	7.3	0	Tonga, Vava'u offshore	V (Moderate)	37.0	11 November	—
5	7.2	0	Peru, Puno	VI (Strong)	237.0	26 May	—
6	7.0	11	Philippines, Cordillera	VIII (Severe)	33.7	27 July	2022 Luzon earthquake
6	7.0	0	Solomon Islands, Guadalcanal offshore	VII (Very strong)	14.0	22 November	—
6	7.0	0	Vanuatu, Tafea offshore	V (Moderate)	137.0	14 September	—
6	7.0	0	New Caledonia, Loyalty Islands offshore	IV (Light)	10.0	31 March	—
6	7.0	0	South of the Fiji Islands	III (Weak)	660.0	9 November	—
6	7.0	0	Fiji region offshore	III (Weak)	587.2	12 November	—

Listed are earthquakes with at least 7.0 magnitude.

== By month ==
=== January ===
January
- Strongest: 6.8 M_{w} United States
- Deadliest: 5.3 M_{w} Afghanistan; 30 deaths
- Total fatalities: 35

Number by magnitude
- 9.0+: 0
- 8.0–8.9: 0
- 7.0–7.9: 0
- 6.0–6.9: 18
- 5.0–5.9: 148
- 4.0–4.9: 1,292

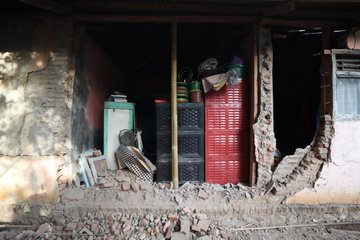
A collapsed wall in Banten, Indonesia

Date	Country and location	M_{w}	Depth (km)	MMI	Notes	Casualties	
Date	Country and location	M_{w}	Depth (km)	MMI	Notes	Dead	Injured
2	China, Yunnan, 99 km (62 mi) east of Shangri-La	5.4	10.0	VI	Thirty people were injured, two of whom are in critical condition, and 7,904 homes were damaged and 1,500 destroyed in Ninglang County.	—	30
3	Vanuatu, Torba offshore, 110 km (68 mi) northwest of Sola	6.0	104.0	IV	—	—	—
3	Taiwan, Hualien offshore, 66 km (41 mi) east of Hualien City	6.2	19.0	IV	Fifteen buildings sustained minor damage in Taipei, such as cracks on walls and tiles falling off walls and ceilings. Power and water services were both disrupted. A car was damaged in Yilan after being hit by a rockfall.	—	—
4	Indonesia offshore, Banda Sea, 284 km (176 mi) east of Katabu	6.0	544.0	II	—	—	—
6	Nicaragua, León offshore, 61 km (38 mi) south of Corinto	6.1	17.0	V	—	—	—
7	Peru, Lima, 6 km (3.7 mi) northwest of Cocachacra	5.6	95.8	V	Some damage was caused in Lima, where twelve buildings were destroyed and rockslides occurred. 39 people were injured, one of them seriously, after jumping and falling from a balcony.	—	39
7	China, Qinghai, 109 km (68 mi) southwest of Jinchang	6.6	13.0	IX	Further information: 2022 Menyuan earthquake	—	9
9	Greece, Western Macedonia, 5 km (3.1 mi) north northwest of Florina	5.5	13.5	VII	In Florina, the facades of buildings fell, cracks on masonry houses appeared, an old uninhabited house in the village of Agia Paraskevi collapsed, and glass windows were shattered. Cracks were reported in a hundred buildings in Bitola, North Macedonia. Two people were injured. Seventeen buildings were also damaged in eastern Albania.	—	2
9	Indonesia, North Maluku, 33 km (21 mi) south southwest of Tobelo	5.4	10.0	VII	Three people were injured.	—	3
10	New Zealand, Kermadec Islands offshore, 526 km (327 mi) northeast of Whangārei	6.2	7.0	V	—	—	—
10	Iraq, Sulaymaniyah, 8 km (5.0 mi) east of Jamjamāl	4.5	10.0	VI	Several buildings were damaged in Chamchamal District.	—	—
11	Cyprus, Paphos offshore, 48 km (30 mi) west northwest of Polis	6.6	21.0	VI	Further information: 2022 Cyprus earthquake	3	1
11	United States, Alaska, Fox Islands offshore, 100 km (62 mi) southeast of Nikolski	6.8	20.0	VI	Spaced an hour apart, these two earthquakes formed a mainshock-aftershock sequence. The first earthquake triggered a tsunami which was observed with heights of 23 cm (0.75 ft).	—	—
11	United States, Alaska, Fox Islands offshore, 53 km (33 mi) southeast of Nikolski	6.6	19.0	V	Spaced an hour apart, these two earthquakes formed a mainshock-aftershock sequence. The first earthquake triggered a tsunami which was observed with heights of 23 cm (0.75 ft).	–	—
14	Indonesia, Banten offshore, 80 km (50 mi) southwest of Labuan	6.6	33.0	VI	At least 226 buildings were destroyed, and at least 3,078 buildings, including 51 schools, 21 mosques, and eight offices were damaged in Pandeglang Regency. A mosque, a hospital, and a wall in East Jakarta mayor's office were cracked. A number of buildings in the Ujung Kulon National Park were damaged or destroyed. In Banten, ten people were injured by falling debris, two of whom are in critical condition.	—	10
14	Albania, Shkodër, 4 km (2.5 mi) southeast of Fushë-Arrëz	4.3	10.0	VI	39 buildings were damaged in Pukë, including a school, a hospital and a museum. The damage is estimated at 5 million euros.	—	—
15	Iran, Kerman, 31 km (19 mi) northeast of Kerman	4.7	10.0	VIII	At least five buildings were damaged in Kerman, and two people were injured.	—	2
16	Papua New Guinea, Bougainville offshore, 75 km (47 mi) west southwest of Panguna	6.1	379.0	III	—	—	—
17	Afghanistan, Badhgis, 45 km (28 mi) east of Qala i Naw	4.9	10.0	–	Further information: January 2022 Afghanistan earthquakes	30	49
17	Afghanistan, Badghis, 45 km (28 mi) east of Qala i Naw	5.3	11.4	VI	Further information: January 2022 Afghanistan earthquakes	30	49
17	Turkey, Kayseri, 3 km (1.9 mi) northwest of Sarıoğlan	4.9	10.0	VII	Cracks appeared in walls of several houses and some livestock were killed by collapsing sheds. Two people were injured after fleeing in panic.	—	2
21	Japan, Ōita offshore, 27 km (17 mi) south southeast of Saiki	6.4	40.0	VII	Power outages occurred in Saiki and water pipes were damaged, flooding roads. At least 13 people were injured, two of them seriously.	—	13
22	Indonesia, North Sulawesi offshore, 234 km (145 mi) southeast of Sarangani, Philippines	6.0	21.0	VI	At least two houses and a church were damaged in Talaud Islands Regency. A construction worker suffered serious injuries after jumping off a building due to panic.	—	1
22	United States, Alaska, Fox Islands offshore, 70 km (43 mi) south of Unalaska	6.2	29.0	VI	—	—	—
23	Iran, East Azerbaijan, 7 km (4.3 mi) west northwest of Tabriz	4.0	10.0	VII	In Tabriz, cracks appeared in the walls of at least five buildings. One person was injured after a fall.	—	1
24	Haiti, Nippes, 4 km (2.5 mi) south of Anse-à-Veau	5.3	10.0	VI	Two people were killed; one in Fonds-des-Nègres by a landslide, the other in Anse-à-Veau by a collapsing wall. Fifty-two people were injured. At least 227 houses were destroyed and 937 were damaged in Nippes. The pair of earthquakes are aftershocks of the 2021 Haiti earthquake.	2	52
24	Haiti, Nippes offshore, 4 km (2.5 mi) east of Anse-à-Veau	5.1	10.0	VI	Two people were killed; one in Fonds-des-Nègres by a landslide, the other in Anse-à-Veau by a collapsing wall. Fifty-two people were injured. At least 227 houses were destroyed and 937 were damaged in Nippes. The pair of earthquakes are aftershocks of the 2021 Haiti earthquake.	2	52
24	Australia, Western Australia, 23 km (14 mi) west of Wagin	4.9	7.4	V	Part of an earthquake swarm. Around twenty buildings had minor damage, such as cracks in walls and ceilings.	—	—
25	South Georgia and the South Sandwich Islands offshore, South Sandwich Islands region	6.0	11.0	III	—	—	—
27	Tonga, Ha'apai offshore, 220 km (140 mi) west northwest of Pangai	6.2	6.2	IV	–	—	—
28	Panama, Chiriquí offshore, 281 km (175 mi) southwest of Arenas	6.0	8.0	III	—	—	—
29	New Zealand, Kermadec Islands offshore, 1,081 km (672 mi) northeast of Whangārei	6.5	8.0	IV	A small tsunami was reported at Boat Cove station on Raoul Island, with heights of around 10 cm (0.33 ft).	—	—

=== February ===
February
- Strongest: 6.8 M_{w} South of the Fiji Islands
- Deadliest: 6.1 M_{w} Indonesia; 27 deaths
- Total fatalities: 33

Number by magnitude
- 9.0+: 0
- 8.0–8.9: 0
- 7.0–7.9: 0
- 6.0–6.9: 10
- 5.0–5.9: 130
- 4.0–4.9: 1,120

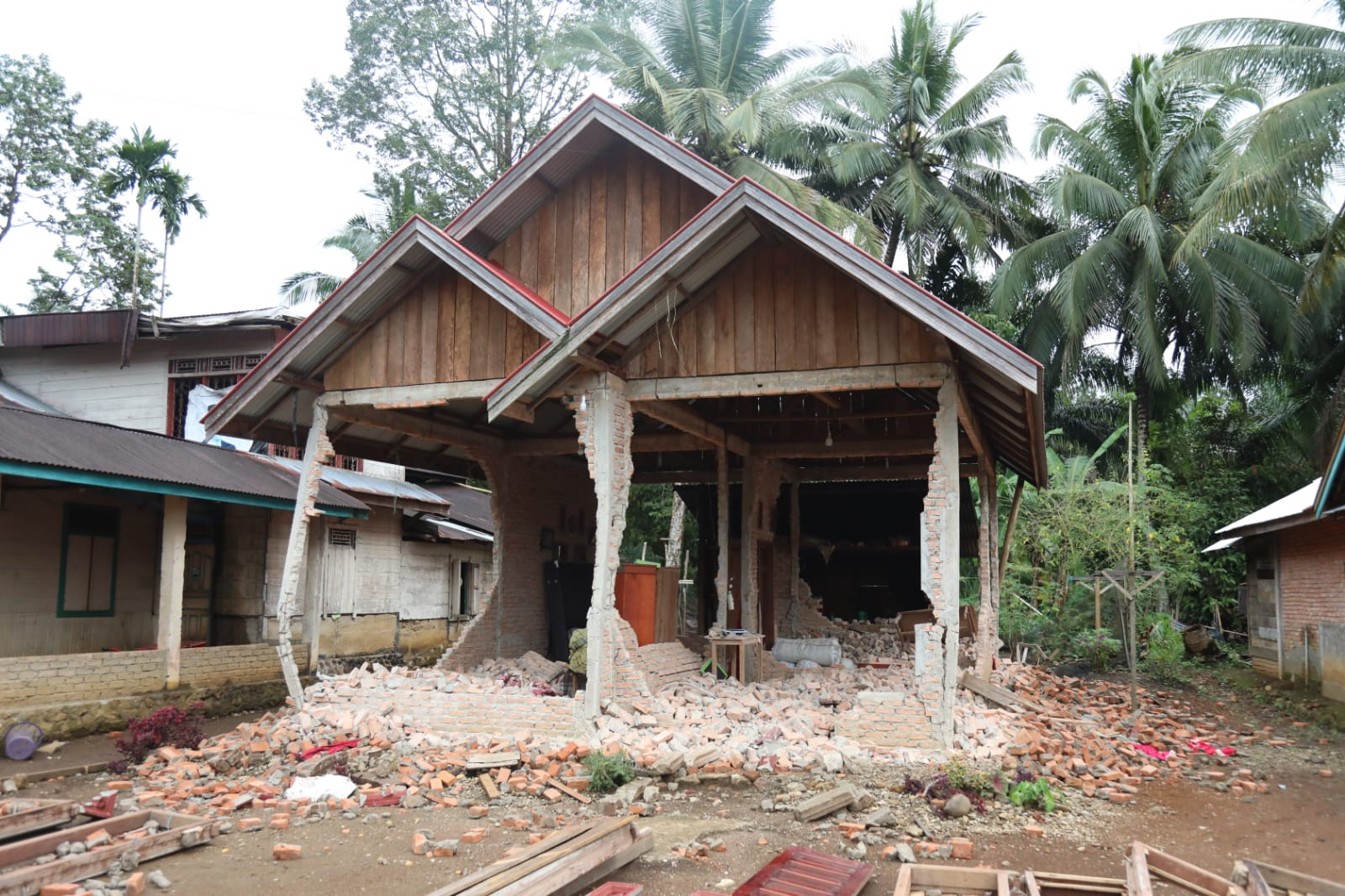
A house destroyed by the 2022 Sumatra earthquake.

Date	Country and location	M_{w}	Depth (km)	MMI	Notes	Casualties	
Date	Country and location	M_{w}	Depth (km)	MMI	Notes	Dead	Injured
1	Indonesia, Maluku offshore, 184 km (114 mi) northeast of Lospalos, Timor Leste	6.0	119.0	IV	—	—	—
3	Peru, Loreto, 49 km (30 mi) northwest of Barranca	6.5	110.0	VI	Eighty houses and seven public buildings were damaged in the Barranca District, while two buildings suffered minor damage in Zamora-Chinchipe Province, Ecuador.	—	—
4	Indonesia, Banten offshore, 71 km (44 mi) west southwest of Pelabuhanratu	5.2	45.9	VI	A school in Lebak Regency was damaged by landslides.	—	—
4	Southeast Indian Ridge	6.3	10.0	—	—	—	—
5	Afghanistan, Badakhshan, 46 km (29 mi) southwest of Ashkāsham	5.8	212.0	IV	Two miners were killed by a landslide in Badakhshan Province. Five houses were destroyed and fifty were damaged in Peshawar, Pakistan, where one person was killed and the minaret of a famous Sufi shrine was tilted.	3	—
7	Poland, Silesia, 4 km (2.5 mi) east southeast of Katowice	4.2	10.0	VII	Three miners were injured by falling rocks.	—	3
8	Central Mid-Atlantic Ridge	6.2	10.0	—	—	—	—
13	Armenia, Lori, 19 km (12 mi) west southwest of Metsavan	5.3	10.0	VI	Fifty buildings were damaged in Armenia, where power outages occurred. In Georgia, cracks appeared in the walls of 21 buildings. In Turkey, two people suffered injuries, and minor damage was caused. It was the largest earthquake in Armenia since 1988.	—	2
13	Guam offshore, 168 km (104 mi) southwest of Merizo Village	6.0	15.0	III	—	—	—
16	Guatemala, Escuintla, 7 km (4.3 mi) southwest of Nueva Concepción	6.2	60.0	VI	Further information: 2022 Guatemala earthquake	3	2
16	South of the Fiji Islands	6.8	535.0	III	—	—	—
21	Antarctica offshore, Balleny Islands region	6.3	14.0	IV	—	—	—
22	Argentina, Jujuy, 58 km (36 mi) west of Abra Pampa	6.0	251.0	IV	—	—	—
23	Colombia, Bolívar, 26 km (16 mi) southwest of Santa Rosa del Sur	5.5	50.7	V	A school was damaged in Santa Rosa del Sur.	—	—
25	Indonesia, West Sumatra, 66 km (41 mi) north northwest of Bukittinggi	6.1	4.9	VIII	Further information: 2022 Sumatra earthquake	27	457

=== March ===
March
- Strongest: 7.3 M_{w} Japan
- Deadliest: 7.3 M_{w} Japan; 4 deaths
- Total fatalities: 6

Number by magnitude
- 9.0+: 0
- 8.0–8.9: 0
- 7.0–7.9: 2
- 6.0–6.9: 13
- 5.0–5.9: 179
- 4.0–4.9: 1,375

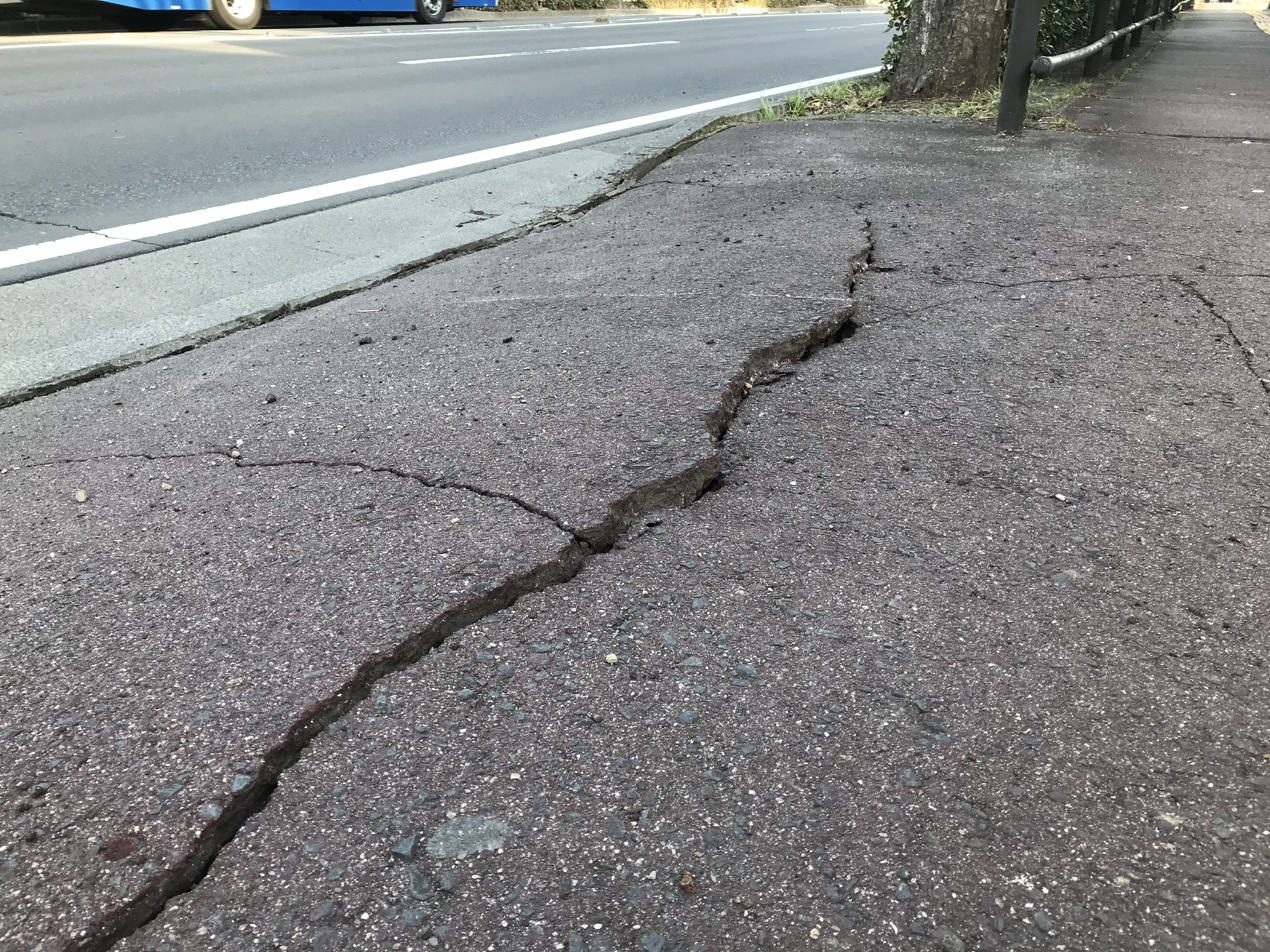
Cracked road in Taihaku, Sendai caused by the 2022 Fukushima earthquake.

Date	Country and location	M_{w}	Depth (km)	MMI	Notes	Casualties	
Date	Country and location	M_{w}	Depth (km)	MMI	Notes	Dead	Injured
2	New Zealand, Kermadec Islands offshore, 951 km (591 mi) northeast of Ngunguru	6.6	24.0	VII	—	—	—
3	Mexico, Veracruz, 15 km (9.3 mi) west northwest of Nopalapan	5.7	109.4	IV	A school in Veracruz was damaged.	—	—
5	Laos, Phôngsali, 85 km (53 mi) north northwest of Phôngsali	4.5	10.0	VII	Five houses were damaged in Yunnan, in neighboring China.	—	—
6	South Georgia and the South Sandwich Islands offshore, South Sandwich Islands region	6.0	15.5	IV	—	—	—
7	Fiji, Lomaiviti offshore, 351 km (218 mi) southeast of Levuka	6.1	581.8	II	—	—	—
12	Indonesia, West Java offshore, 63 km (39 mi) southwest of Pelabuhanratu	5.3	10.0	V	Houses in Sukabumi were damaged, one of which was completely destroyed.	—	—
12	France, Auvergne-Rhône-Alpes, 3 km (1.9 mi) south of Faverges	4.5	2.7	VI	Buildings and chimneys were damaged. In Frontenex, the cross of a church fell.	—	—
13	Philippines, Mimaropa offshore, 67 km (42 mi) northwest of Cabra	6.4	11.0	IV	At least three houses in Lubang sustained damage.	—	—
13	Indonesia, West Sumatra offshore, 168 km (104 mi) west of Pariaman	6.7	21.8	VII	Some damage was caused in South Nias Regency, and one person was slightly injured. Tsunami waves up to 8 cm (0.26 ft) were also reported.	—	1
15	Peru, Arequipa, 16 km (9.9 mi) east southeast of Huambo	4.7	10.0	VI	Foreshock of the 5.5 earthquake a day later. Several houses were damaged in Maca and landslides occurred in Caylloma.	—	—
16	Indonesia, West Java offshore, 80 km (50 mi) southwest of Banjar	5.3	37.0	VI	At least seven buildings were damaged in Cianjur Regency.	—	—
16	Peru, Arequipa, 12 km (7.5 mi) south of Tapay	5.5	10.7	VII	Landslides occurred in Caylloma. Six people were injured.	—	6
16	Pakistan, Gilgit-Baltistan, 67 km (42 mi) southeast of Gilgit	5.1	9.1	VII	Major damage and landslides occurred in the region, blocking roads. One person was killed and nine were injured by falling rocks in the village of Astak.	1	9
16	Japan, Fukushima offshore, 62 km (39 mi) east northeast of Namie	6.0	48.1	IV	Foreshock of the 7.3 quake a few minutes later.	—	—
16	Japan, Fukushima offshore, 57 km (35 mi) east northeast of Namie	7.3	41.0	VIII	Further information: 2022 Fukushima earthquake	4	247
16	Iran, Hormozgan, 59 km (37 mi) north northwest of Bandar Lengeh	5.9	22.0	VII	A few buildings were damaged and electricity was disrupted in Faramarzan and Kukherd. Landslides also occurred in the region. Two people were injured. The earthquake could be also felt in the United Arab Emirates.	—	2
19	Algeria, Béjaïa offshore, 15 km (9.3 mi) northeast of Béjaïa	5.2	10.0	VIII	Over 1,700 buildings, including a school and a hospital, were damaged in Béjaïa. The interior ceiling of a room also fell in. Thirty people were injured, including three students who fell in panic.	—	30
19	Iran, Fars, 91 km (57 mi) southeast of Darab	4.7	10.0	VII	Cracks appeared in the walls of 10 homes. Two people were injured.	—	2
19	Tonga, Eua offshore, 462 km (287 mi) southeast of Ohonua	6.3	21.0	I	—	—	—
20	Philippines, Eastern Visayas, 5 km (3.1 mi) southwest of Burauen	5.3	10.0	VII	39 houses were damaged and one was destroyed in Burauen.	—	—
20	New Zealand, Kermadec Islands offshore, 1,107 km (688 mi) northeast of Whangārei	6.0	47.6	IV	—	—	—
21	Philippines, Zamboanga Peninsula offshore, 10 km (6.2 mi) south of Limaong	3.8	10.0	V	One school suffered damage on Vitali Island.	—	—
21	Norway, Vestland offshore, 138 km (86 mi) west of Florø	5.2	10.0	VI	It is the largest earthquake to hit Norway since 1989. The municipal hall in Modalen Municipality was slightly damaged.	—	—
22	Northern Mid-Atlantic Ridge	6.7	10.0	—	—	—	—
22	Taiwan, Taitung offshore, 62 km (39 mi) south of Hualien City	6.7	24.0	VII	One person was injured by broken glass. A bridge collapsed in Yuli, 230 buildings were damaged and one was destroyed, and power outages occurred. A road cracked in Taitung, and rockfalls blocked roads in Changbin and Donghe.	—	1
23	Haiti, Grand'Anse offshore, 18 km (11 mi) north of Jérémie	5.1	10.0	VIII	Some houses and a church were damaged in Jérémie. Five people suffered minor injuries.	—	5
23	Vanuatu, Sanma offshore, 36 km (22 mi) southeast of Port-Olry	6.0	115.7	IV	—	—	—
24	Indonesia, Maluku, 44 km (27 mi) west of Amahai	4.7	53.8	VII	At least 42 buildings were damaged in Ambon.	—	—
25	Indonesia, Southeast Sulawesi offshore, 39 km (24 mi) east northeast of Kendari	4.7	10.0	V	In Kendari, dozens of homes and a religious monument were damaged. Items were knocked off shelves in shops and supermarkets.	—	—
27	Ecuador, Esmeraldas, 7 km (4.3 mi) southeast of Esmeraldas	5.8	19.0	VII	Power outages and telecommunication disruptions were reported in Esmeraldas. One person died of a cardiac arrest and another was injured. 717 homes collapsed and 7,408 were damaged. Two hospitals were also damaged.	1	1
29	Peru, Apurímac, 7 km (4.3 mi) south of Abancay	4.4	68.4	V	Three homes were destroyed and 32 were damaged in Abancay. 78 people were displaced.	—	—
29	Poland, Lower Silesian Voivodeship	3.0	10.0	—	A mine collapse occurred in Katowice, injuring one person.	—	1
30	New Caledonia, Loyalty Islands offshore, 279 km (173 mi) southeast of Tadine	6.9	10.0	IV	Foreshock of the 7.0 event eight hours later. Small tsunamis were observed, with heights of 6 cm (0.20 ft) in the Ouinne River, 7 cm (0.23 ft) in Tadine, and 2 cm (0.066 ft) in Lifou.	—	—
31	Iran, Khuzestan, 19 km (12 mi) southeast of Aghajari	4.7	10.0	IV	One person was injured.	—	1
31	New Caledonia, Loyalty Islands offshore, 279 km (173 mi) east southeast of Tadine	7.0	10.0	IV	A tsunami with heights of 5 cm (0.16 ft) was detected in Tadine.	—	—
31	New Caledonia, Loyalty Islands offshore, 326 km (203 mi) southeast of Tadine	6.4	20.0	V	Aftershock of the 7.0 earthquake 14 hours earlier.	—	—

=== April ===
April
- Strongest: 6.6 M_{w} Nicaragua
- Deadliest: 2.7 M_{w} Poland; 10 deaths
- Total fatalities: 11

Number by magnitude
- 9.0+: 0
- 8.0–8.9: 0
- 7.0–7.9: 0
- 6.0–6.9: 8
- 5.0–5.9: 128
- 4.0–4.9: 1,224

Date	Country and location	M_{w}	Depth (km)	MMI	Notes	Casualties	
Date	Country and location	M_{w}	Depth (km)	MMI	Notes	Dead	Injured
1	Netherlands, Groningen, 10 km (6.2 mi) west of Delfzijl	2.7	3.0	—	At least 250 buildings were damaged in Loppersum. This earthquake was caused by gas extraction.	—	—
4	Bulgaria, Varna, 10 km (6.2 mi) southeast of Provadia	4.6	10.0	VII	The town hall of Provadia and a church were damaged.	—	—
4	Vanuatu, Shefa offshore, 56 km (35 mi) west northwest of Port Vila	6.0	31.0	V	—	—	—
5	China, Sichuan, 4 km (2.5 mi) southeast of Xunchang	4.6	10.0	VII	In Xingwen County, several roads cracked and a highway collapsed, 1,660 homes were damaged, power outages occurred and rockslides were reported. Train services were disrupted.	—	—
8	Iraq, Wasit, 26 km (16 mi) west of Mehran, Iran	3.6	10.0	III	One person was injured while fleeing in panic in Mehran.	—	1
9	Turkey, Malatya, 7 km (4.3 mi) north northeast of Sincik	5.3	10.0	VIII	A few old houses were destroyed and several unoccupied buildings were damaged in Pütürge.	—	—
9	Vanuatu, Malampa offshore, 63 km (39 mi) west southwest of Norsup	6.3	17.0	V	The earthquake triggered a tsunami with heights of 21 cm (0.69 ft).	—	—
10	Peru, Arequipa, 19 km (12 mi) southeast of Toro	3.9	10.0	III	Around forty houses were destroyed in Madrigal, and 200 people were evacuated.	—	—
13	Papua New Guinea, East New Britain, 28 km (17 mi) west southwest of Kokopo	6.1	149.0	IV	—	—	—
17	Vanuatu, Malampa offshore, 62 km (39 mi) northeast of Norsup	6.1	200.9	IV	—	—	—
18	Indonesia, North Maluku, 31 km (19 mi) west northwest of Tobelo	5.0	19.3	VI	At least 69 buildings were destroyed and 226 were damaged in five villages, including a church. Two people were injured.	—	2
18	Vietnam, Kon Tum, 45 km (28 mi) north northeast of Kon Tum	4.8	10.0	IV	Schools were damaged in Kon Plông district.	—	—
19	Philippines, Davao offshore, 41 km (25 mi) east of Santiago	6.1	19.0	V	Spaced a day apart, these two earthquakes can be considered a doublet.	—	—
20	Philippines, Davao offshore, 50 km (31 mi) southeast of Manay	6.0	19.0	V	Spaced a day apart, these two earthquakes can be considered a doublet.	—	—
21	Nicaragua, León offshore, 58 km (36 mi) west southwest of Masachapa	6.6	25.3	V	Some buildings and a church, which was previously affected by the 1972 earthquake, were damaged and power outages occurred in Managua. A small tsunami with heights of 7 cm (0.23 ft) was also observed.	—	—
22	Bosnia and Herzegovina, Srpska, 13 km (8.1 mi) north northeast of Ljubinje	5.7	10.0	VIII	Further information: 2022 Bosnia and Herzegovina earthquake	1	14
23	Poland, Silesian Voivodeship, 4 km (2.5 mi) northeast of Świerklany Górne	2.7	5.0	V	Ten people were killed in a mining accident in Zofiówka in coal mine.	10	
23	Iran, Fars, 30 km (19 mi) east of Kazerun	4.4	10.0	VI	Ten homes were damaged in the region around the epicentre. One person was injured after jumping out from a window.	—	1
24	Bosnia and Herzegovina, Srpska, 12 km (7.5 mi) north northeast of Ljubinje	4.8	10.0	VI	Aftershock of the 5.7 earthquake two days prior. Further damage was caused, with many buildings, including barracks built during the Austro-Hungarian Empire, being affected.	—	—
27	Poland, Lower Silesia, 6 km (3.7 mi) west southwest of Rudna	4.4	5.0	VI	One person was injured in a mine near Rudna.	—	1
28	Papua New Guinea, Madang offshore, 175 km (109 mi) north northeast of Madang	6.1	10.0	IV	—	—	—

=== May ===
May
- Strongest: 7.2 M_{w} Peru
- Deadliest: 5.4 M_{w} Peru; 2 deaths 4.9 M_{w} Afghanistan; 2 deaths
- Total fatalities: 4

Number by magnitude
- 9.0+: 0
- 8.0–8.9: 0
- 7.0–7.9: 1
- 6.0–6.9: 12
- 5.0–5.9: 132
- 4.0–4.9: 1,013

Date	Country and location	M_{w}	Depth (km)	MMI	Notes	Casualties	
Date	Country and location	M_{w}	Depth (km)	MMI	Notes	Dead	Injured
5	Philippines, Davao offshore, 94 km (58 mi) southeast of Lukatan	6.0	18.0	IV	—	—	—
6	Pakistan, Balochistan, 80 km (50 mi) north of Bela	5.1	10.0	VI	At least 260 buildings were damaged and more than 80 houses were destroyed in the Khuzdar area. One child was injured and 200 families were displaced.	—	1
9	Taiwan, Hualien offshore, 70 km (43 mi) southwest of Yonakuni, Japan	6.2	21.0	IV	—	—	—
9	Papua New Guinea, Madang offshore, 177 km (110 mi) southwest of Lorengau	6.3	10.0	IV	—	—	—
10	Argentina, Jujuy, 85 km (53 mi) north northwest of San Antonio de los Cobres	6.8	220.0	VI	—	—	—
12	Colombia, Valle del Cauca, 10 km (6.2 mi) north of Darien	5.0	88.8	VI	Several houses, two supermarkets, and a terminal were damaged in three towns in Valle del Cauca.	—	—
12	Peru, Lima offshore, 12 km (7.5 mi) west northwest of San Bartolo	5.4	51.2	VII	Two people were indirectly killed, 11 others were injured, four houses collapsed and 17 others were damaged in the Lima-Huaral area.	2	11
17	Iran, Khuzestan, 70 km (43 mi) east northeast of Ramhormoz	4.9	10.0	VI	Many homes damaged.	—	—
19	Australia, Tasmania offshore, 40 km (25 mi) north of Macquarie Island	6.9	10.0	V	—	—	—
20	China, Sichuan, 74 km (46 mi) east of Kangding	4.9	10.0	IV	At least 468 houses were damaged in Hanyuan County. Roads were also blocked by rockfalls. This was an aftershock of the 2013 Lushan earthquake nine years prior.	—	—
21	Philippines, Calabarzon, 1 km (0.62 mi) south of Lian	6.1	129.0	V	—	—	—
22	Tonga, Tongatapu offshore, 855 km (531 mi) southwest of Vaini	6.3	589.5	II	—	—	—
22	Japan, Chiba offshore, 237 km (147 mi) southeast of Katsuura	6.0	15.8	III	—	—	—
24	Afghanistan, Badakhshan, 62 km (39 mi) southeast of Farkhār	4.9	106.2	VI	Several houses in the Jurm District suffered minor damage. Two people died and another was injured when their house collapsed.	2	1
24	Zimbabwe, Matabeleland North, 14 km (8.7 mi) southeast of Binga	4.7	10.0	VIII	Severe damage occurred in some buildings, including a school.	—	—
25	Mexico, Oaxaca, 12 km (7.5 mi) west northwest of Santa María Ecatepec	5.5	12.0	VI	One house was destroyed and a fire occurred at an oil refinery in Salina Cruz. A tsunami was also observed with heights of 47 cm (1.54 ft) in Puerto Chiapas.	—	—
26	Peru, Puno, 1 km (0.62 mi) north of Azángaro	7.2	252.0	VI	Two buildings collapsed and 115 others, including seventeen schools, five hospitals, 87 houses, a church, four tourist sites and a bridge were damaged in the departments of Puno, Arequipa and Ayacucho. A highway was also blocked by a rockslide.	—	—
26	New Caledonia, Loyalty Islands offshore, 460 km (290 mi) south southeast of Tadine	6.6	10.0	III	—	—	—
26	Southern East Pacific Rise	6.2	10.0	—	—	—	—
27	Timor Leste, Lautém offshore, 38 km (24 mi) northeast of Lospalos	6.2	49.0	VI	In Maluku, Indonesia, a house and a school were damaged. The quake was felt as far away as Darwin, Australia.	—	—
27	Peru, Ica, 14 km (8.7 mi) southeast of Santiago	5.5	43.0	IV	Eight people were injured while fleeing in panic, and several buildings, including a shopping mall, three schools and two health facilities in Ica were damaged.	—	8

=== June ===
June
- Strongest: 6.5 M_{w} Brazil
- Deadliest: 6.0 M_{w} Afghanistan; 1,163 deaths
- Total fatalities: 1,173

Number by magnitude
- 9.0+: 0
- 8.0–8.9: 0
- 7.0–7.9: 0
- 6.0–6.9: 6
- 5.0–5.9: 113
- 4.0–4.9: 1,021

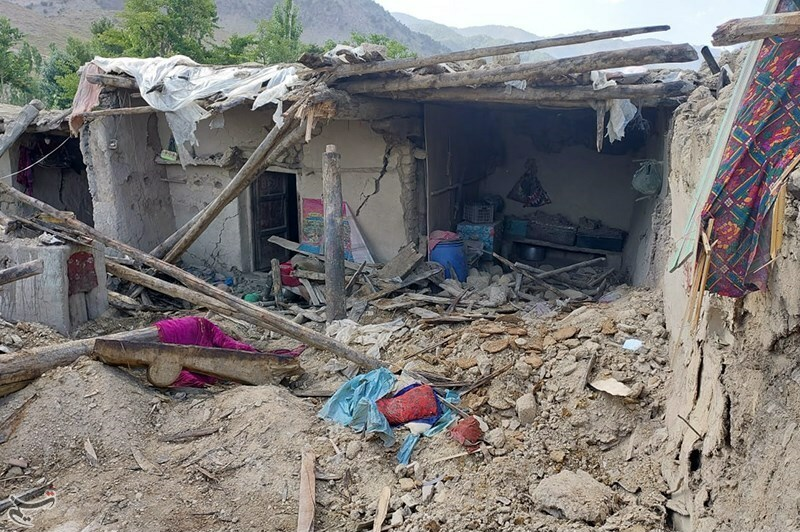
A severely damaged home after the earthquake in Afghanistan.

Date	Country and location	M_{w}	Depth (km)	MMI	Notes	Casualties	
Date	Country and location	M_{w}	Depth (km)	MMI	Notes	Dead	Injured
1	China, Sichuan, 45 km (28 mi) west of Linqiong	5.8	10.0	VII	Further information: 2022 Ya'an earthquake	4	42
4	Kuwait, Al Ahmadi, 25 km (16 mi) south southwest of Al Ahmadi	4.4	10.0	VI	It is the strongest earthquake to hit Kuwait in the last 30 years. There were reports of damage to some buildings.	—	—
4	Tonga, Vavaʻu offshore, 126 km (78 mi) northwest of Neiafu	6.3	237.0	IV	—	—	—
4	Australia, Tasmania offshore, 1,617 km (1,005 mi) south of Geeveston	6.4	10.0	VI	—	—	—
4	United States, Alaska offshore, Rat Islands, 347 km (216 mi) west of Adak	6.3	105.0	V	—	—	—
8	Brazil, Acre, 111 km (69 mi) south southwest of Tarauacá	6.5	621.9	II	—	—	—
8	Indonesia, West Sulawesi offshore, 40 km (25 mi) west southwest of Mamuju	5.8	23.6	V	At least 259 buildings, including a mosque and an office building, were damaged in Mamuju and Majene, some of which were completely destroyed. Seventeen people were injured.	—	17
9	China, Sichuan, 254 km (158 mi) northwest of Tianpeng	5.9	14.1	VII	At least 492 houses were damaged in Hongyuan County, along with several bridges. Power outages also occurred. Six people were injured and 25,790 were evacuated.	—	6
12	Turkey, Van, 29 km (18 mi) northeast of Van	5.2	10.0	V	One house collapsed and twenty others were damaged in Erciş and Van.	—	—
15	Iran, Hormozgan offshore, 21 km (13 mi) northeast of Kish	5.5	10.0	VII	Cracks appeared in around 20 buildings in Bandar Charak, and four people were injured.	—	4
18	United States, Georgia, 7 km (4.3 mi) east of Stillmore	3.9	0.8	IV	It is the largest earthquake to hit the state since 2014. On Hutchinson Island, the earthquake caused land to slump into the Savannah River, seriously damaging the parking garage of a dock situated above.	—	—
19	Japan, Ishikawa, 61 km (38 mi) north northeast of Nanao	5.1	10.0	VI	Damage was observed in Suzu, where items fell off shelves, windows were shattered, and a stone torii gate and the walls of a temple collapsed. At least seven people were injured.	—	7
21	Afghanistan, Paktika, 51 km (32 mi) southwest of Khost	6.0	4.0	IX	Further information: June 2022 Afghanistan earthquake	1,163	2,976
21	Mexico, Jalisco, 1 km (0.62 mi) west of Ciudad Guzmán	2.4	1.0	—	At least 102 houses were damaged, 22 of which were uninhabitable. Over 138 people were affected and 33 were left homeless.	—	—
22	Nepal, Gandaki, 14 km (8.7 mi) east southeast of Chitre	4.6	10.0	IV	A teenager was injured when a house collapsed in Pokhara.	—	1
24	Pakistan, Khyber Pakhtunkhwa, 49 km (30 mi) west of Miran Shah	4.2	10.0	VII	Aftershock of the June 2022 Afghanistan earthquake three days earlier. In Gayan District, Afghanistan, five people were killed and eleven were injured.	5	11
25	Iran, Hormozgan offshore, 30 km (19 mi) northeast of Kīsh	5.6	10.0	VII	One person died from a fall and at least 37 were injured.	1	37
26	Algeria, Oran offshore, 13 km (8.1 mi) north northwest of Aïn el Bya	4.6	10.0	VII	Some homes in Arzew sustained cracks. Eighty people were injured.	—	80
30	Philippines, Cagayan Valley offshore, 49 km (30 mi) north northeast of Namuac	6.0	34.7	V	Some damage was reported in Aparri, where one house collapsed.	—	—

=== July ===
July
- Strongest: 7.0 M_{w} Philippines
- Deadliest: 7.0 M_{w} Philippines; 11 deaths
- Total fatalities: 21

Number by magnitude
- 9.0+: 0
- 8.0–8.9: 0
- 7.0–7.9: 1
- 6.0–6.9: 8
- 5.0–5.9: 71
- 4.0–4.9: 396

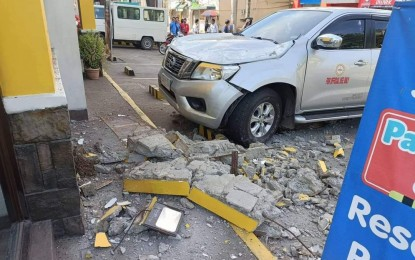
A vehicle damaged by falling debris after the earthquake in Luzon.

Date	Country and location	M_{w}	Depth (km)	MMI	Notes	Casualties	
Date	Country and location	M_{w}	Depth (km)	MMI	Notes	Dead	Injured
1	Iran, Hormozgan, 55 km (34 mi) northeast of Bandar Lengeh	6.0	16.0	VII	Further information: 2022 Hormozgan earthquakes	7	111
1	Iran, Hormozgan, 57 km (35 mi) northeast of Bandar Lengeh	6.0	10.0	VII	Further information: 2022 Hormozgan earthquakes	7	111
3	Iran, Gilan offshore, 37 km (23 mi) north of Astaneh-ye Ashrafiyeh	4.1	10.0	V	An elderly woman was injured after fleeing in panic.	—	1
5	Russia, Kemerovo, 12 km (7.5 mi) north of Mezhdurechensk	4.3	5.0	VI	The earthquake caused rockfalls in Mezhdurechensk, killing two miners and injuring two others.	2	2
11	Vanuatu, Tafea offshore, 82 km (51 mi) east southeast of Port Vila	6.0	10.0	V	—	—	—
12	Mexico, Chihuahua, 14 km (8.7 mi) northeast of San Juanito	4.6	12.2	IV	Three municipalities were affected, with fifteen homes damaged in Maguarichi, a further four in Bocoyna and one in Guerrero.	—	—
12	Chile, Easter Island offshore, 696 km (432 mi) northwest of Hanga Roa	6.8	10.0	III	These two similarly sized earthquakes occurring several seconds apart can be considered as a doublet earthquake.	—	—
12	Chile, Easter Island offshore, 715 km (444 mi) northwest of Hanga Roa	6.6	33.0	–	These two similarly sized earthquakes occurring several seconds apart can be considered as a doublet earthquake.	–	–
13	Peru, Moquegua, 3 km (1.9 mi) southwest of La Capilla	5.5	10.0	VII	Eighty-five adobe homes collapsed, and 558 others were damaged. Landslides occurred, blocking roads. Six people were injured and 85 people were left homeless.	—	6
14	Ecuador, Guayas, 12 km (7.5 mi) southwest of Samborondón	5.7	73.0	IV	At least 96 buildings were damaged, most of them in Guayaquil. In the town of Simón Bolívar, a 16-year-old boy died after being electrocuted by a falling power line. Two others were also injured.	1	2
15	Chile, Aysén offshore, 511 km (318 mi) west southwest of Quellón	6.4	24.5	IV	—	—	—
17	El Salvador, Ahuachapán, 3 km (1.9 mi) west of Atiquizaya	4.2	8.2	V	It is a part of an earthquake swarm. One house collapsed and many others were damaged in Atiquizaya.	—	—
18	Afghanistan, Paktika, 50 km (31 mi) southwest of Khost	5.2	10.0	V	Aftershock of the June 2022 Afghanistan earthquake. Six-hundred houses in the Gayan District were destroyed and 44 people were injured.	—	44
21	Myanmar, Shan, 53 km (33 mi) south of Kengtung	5.9	5.0	VII	In Kengtung, the wall of a school collapsed and some homes were damaged. Wall collapses were also reported in the villages of Naungfa and Katfa.	—	—
23	Iran, Hormozgan, 69 km (43 mi) northeast of Bandar Lengeh	5.6	10.0	VII	Aftershock of the doublet 6.0 earthquakes three weeks prior. Several houses were damaged and rockfalls blocked roads. One person was injured while fleeing in a panic.	—	1
25	Ecuador, Carchi, 10 km (6.2 mi) north of San Gabriel	5.7	2.5	VII	In Ecuador, at least 398 buildings were damaged, 41 of them severely. In neighboring Colombia, especially in the city of Túquerres, one house collapsed and 50 others were damaged. Nine people were injured, three of them suffering fractures and bruises.	—	9
26	Turkey, Kahramanmaraş, 25 km (16 mi) south southeast of Kahramanmaraş	4.0	10.0	VI	Some homes and a hospital collapsed in Kahramanmaraş.	—	—
26	Ecuador, Carchi, 6 km (3.7 mi) south southwest of El Ángel	4.4	10.0	VI	Aftershock of the 5.7 event the day prior. Additional damage was caused in Montúfar, where a previously weakened house collapsed.	—	—
27	Philippines, Cordillera, 13 km (8.1 mi) southeast of Bantay	7.0	33.7	VIII	Further information: 2022 Luzon earthquake	11	615
27	Chile, Antofagasta, 52 km (32 mi) east northeast of Calama	6.2	96.8	V	Some minor damage was caused, such as objects falling off shelves. Rockslides were also reported.	—	—
28	Chile, Antofagasta offshore, 22 km (14 mi) northwest of Tocopilla	6.1	54.0	VII	A police station and a school were damaged in Tocopilla. One person was injured.	—	1
28	India, Chhattisgarh, 16 km (9.9 mi) north northwest of Baikunthpur	4.7	15.7	VI	Five labourers were injured near a mine in Baikunthpur.	—	5
29	Indonesia, Bali offshore, 28 km (17 mi) west northwest of Bedugul	4.4	10.0	IV	40 homes in the Karangasem Regency suffered moderate damage.	—	—
30	Iran, East Azerbaijan, 58 km (36 mi) north of Takab	3.9	10.0	–	Homes in two villages were damaged.	—	—
31	Nepal, Sagarmatha, 27 km (17 mi) west of Bhojpur	5.1	10.0	VI	Two schools and a police station were destroyed, and 475 other structures were damaged in the Khotang District.	—	—
31	Iceland, Southern Peninsula, 1 km (0.62 mi) southeast of Vogar	5.4	10.0	VII	It is the largest in a swarm of 10,000 quakes since 30 July, related to the volcanic eruption at Fagradalsfjall. In Kópavogur, part of a shopping center collapsed. Rockslides were also triggered.	—	—

=== August ===
August
- Strongest: 6.6 M_{w} New Zealand
- Total fatalities: 0

Number by magnitude
- 9.0+: 0
- 8.0–8.9: 0
- 7.0–7.9: 0
- 6.0–6.9: 5
- 5.0–5.9: 111
- 4.0–4.9: 709

Date	Country and location	M_{w}	Depth (km)	MMI	Notes	Casualties	
Date	Country and location	M_{w}	Depth (km)	MMI	Notes	Dead	Injured
10	Japan, Hokkaido, 50 km (31 mi) south southeast of Makubetsu	5.1	4.7	VIII	In Nakagawa, items fell off shelves in supermarkets and falling furniture. Roads were extensively damaged, and nine people were evacuated due to gas leaks.	–	–
14	New Zealand, Kermadec Islands offshore, 661 km (411 mi) northeast of Whitianga	6.6	39.1	VI	–	–	–
14	New Caledonia, Loyalty Islands offshore, 324 km (201 mi) east of Tadine	6.4	78.0	II	–	–	–
22	Indonesia, Bali offshore, 49 km (30 mi) southeast of Nusa Dua	5.4	140.9	IV	A hotel was damaged in South Kuta. In Gianyar, the facade of a school fell. Many houses were damaged to varying extents, and some collapsed in Karangasem Regency. In neighbouring Lombok, the ceiling of a house collapsed, and one person was slightly injured.	–	1
22	Afghanistan, Khost, 47 km (29 mi) southwest of Khost	4.6	35.9	VI	Aftershock of the earthquake in June. In the Gayan District, several previously weakened houses collapsed.	–	–
23	Vietnam, Kon Tum, 43 km (27 mi) north northeast of Kon Tum	4.8	10.0	VI	It is the strongest earthquake in a swarm related to a hydropower plant, and the largest in the area in over a century. In Kon Plông district, at least five houses were damaged, one of them suffering collapsed roofs.	–	–
23	Indonesia, Bengkulu offshore, 117 km (73 mi) south of Pagar Alam	6.2	55.8	IV	In West Lampung Regency, cracks appeared on the floors and walls of some houses. In the Kaur Regency, the ceiling of a house collapsed, several houses and a church sustained cracks. One person suffered head injuries.	–	1
29	Indonesia, West Sumatra offshore, 170 km (110 mi) west southwest of Pariaman	6.2	17.6	VI	Five buildings were damaged in the Mentawai Islands Regency, one of them severely. About 2,300 people were evacuated.	–	–
30	Pacific-Antarctic Ridge	6.3	10.0	–	–	–	–
31	Saudi Arabia, Al Bahah, near Al Bahah	3.6	–	–	Several buildings were damaged in Al Bahah, including a school. Landslides also blocked roads.	–	–

=== September ===
September
- Strongest: 7.6 M_{w} Papua New Guinea; 7.6 M_{w} Mexico
- Deadliest: 6.6 M_{w} China; 93 deaths
- Total fatalities: 146

Number by magnitude
- 9.0+: 0
- 8.0–8.9: 0
- 7.0–7.9: 3
- 6.0–6.9: 14
- 5.0–5.9: 90
- 4.0–4.9: 588

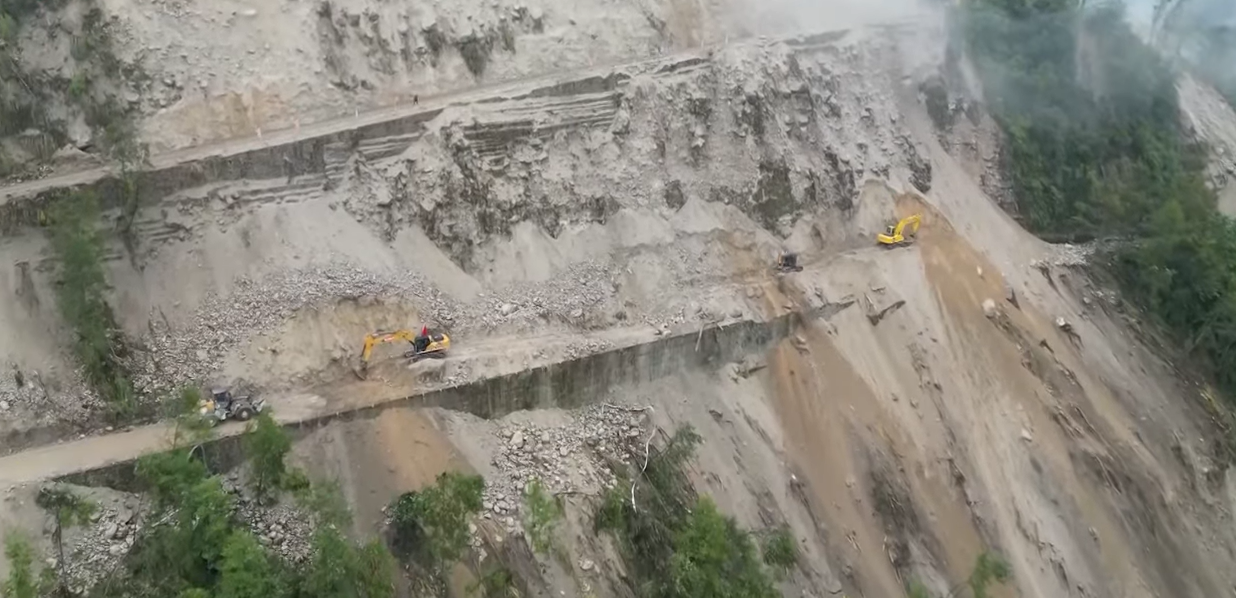
A road blocked by a landslide in Luding County, Sichuan, after the earthquake

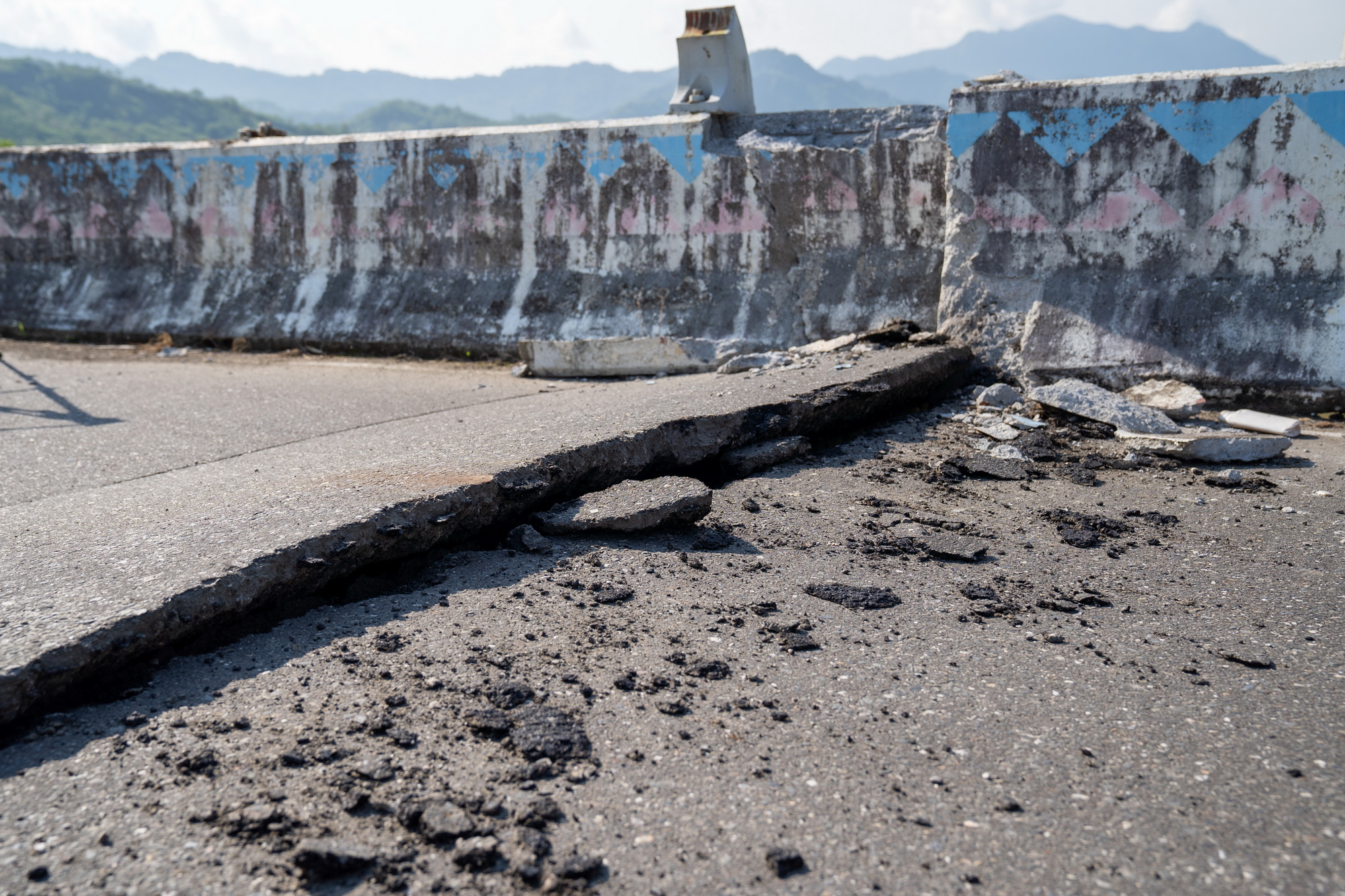
The damaged Baohua Bridge after the mainshock of the 2022 Taitung earthquakes

Date	Country and location	M_{w}	Depth (km)	MMI	Notes	Casualties	
Date	Country and location	M_{w}	Depth (km)	MMI	Notes	Dead	Injured
2	Papua New Guinea, West New Britain, 111 km (69 mi) west northwest of Kandrian	6.1	126.9	V	–	–	–
4	Central Mid-Atlantic Ridge	6.9	10.0	–	–	–	–
4	Afghanistan, Kunar, 34 km (21 mi) northeast of Jalalabad	5.1	10.0	VII	Further information: September 2022 Afghanistan earthquake	18	42
4	Southern East Pacific Rise	6.2	10.0	–	–	–	–
5	China, Sichuan, 43 km (27 mi) southeast of Kangding	6.6	16.0	IX	Further information: 2022 Luding earthquake	93	423
6	Afghanistan, Badakhshan, 30 km (19 mi) southwest of Jurm	4.8	70.8	III	Six people died and nine were injured in Afghanistan's Kunar Province.	6	9
9	Indonesia, Papua, 263 km (163 mi) east southeast of Biak	6.2	18.0	VII	These two similarly sized earthquakes occurring about 30 minutes apart can be considered as a doublet earthquake.	–	–
10	Indonesia, Papua, 260 km (160 mi) east southeast of Biak	6.2	21.0	VII	These two similarly sized earthquakes occurring about 30 minutes apart can be considered as a doublet earthquake.	–	–
10	France, Grand Est, 2 km (1.2 mi) west northwest of Landser	3.9	8.9	V	It is the largest earthquake to be felt in Germany since 2004. Some buildings damaged in Bad Krozingen, Bad Bellingen, and Mulhouse.	–	–
10	Indonesia, West Sumatra offshore, 175 km (109 mi) west southwest Pariaman	6.0	20.0	VI	Two people injured by falling debris in the Mentawai Islands. Some structures received minor damage, and about 200 people evacuated.	–	2
10	Papua New Guinea, Morobe, 66 km (41 mi) east of Kainantu	7.6	116.0	VIII	Further information: 2022 Papua New Guinea earthquake	21	42
14	Vanuatu, Tafea offshore, 209 km (130 mi) south southeast of Isangel	7.0	137.0	V	–	–	–
17	Taiwan, Taitung offshore, 96 km (60 mi) east of Yujing	6.5	10.0	VII	Further information: 2022 Taitung earthquakes	–	8
18	Taiwan, Hualien, 86 km (53 mi) southeast of Lugu	6.9	10.0	IX	Further information: 2022 Taitung earthquakes	1	171
19	Mexico, Michoacán, 37 km (23 mi) southeast of Aquila	7.6	26.9	VIII	Further information: 2022 Michoacán earthquake	2	35
19	Pakistan, Gilgit-Baltistan, 60 km (37 mi) west northwest of Skardu	4.6	10.0	V	Some damage and landslides occurred in the Roundu District, where at least seven people were injured.	–	7
20	Russia, Commander Islands offshore, 253 km (157 mi) east southeast of Ust'-Kamchatsk Staryy	6.0	10.0	VI	–	–	–
22	Mexico, Michoacán, 46 km (29 mi) south southwest of Aguililla	6.8	20.0	VII	Aftershock of the 7.6 quake on 19 September. A building was damaged in Uruapan. Power outages were reported in some areas, and landslides also occurred. In Mexico City, a woman died after falling from the stairs of her home while fleeing in panic, while another person died of a heart attack. In Colima, a child was killed by a gas explosion, while five others were injured. A tsunami was also observed, with heights of 8 cm (0.26 ft).	3	5
22	Italy, Liguria, 1 km (0.62 mi) north of Bogliasco	4.4	10.0	V	A church and 15 other buildings were damaged in Genoa, while train services in the city were also disrupted. It was the largest earthquake in the area since 1887.	–	–
23	Indonesia, Aceh offshore, 40 km (25 mi) southwest of Meulaboh	6.2	42.2	V	Some buildings were slightly damaged.	–	–
23	Chile, Los Lagos offshore, 156 km (97 mi) west northwest of Ancud	6.1	20.0	IV	–	–	–
24	Netherlands, Groningen, 3 km (1.9 mi) south southwest of Spijk	2.7	5.0	V	Fifty-two buildings were damaged.	–	–
27	Turkey, Kars, 21 km (13 mi) west southwest of Susuz	5.3	10.0	VI	Some homes and barns collapsed in Kars and in neighboring Ardahan Province, and three people were injured when walls collapsed.	–	3
28	Indonesia, West Sumatra, 66 km (41 mi) northwest of Bukittinggi	4.5	10.0	–	Some damage was caused in the West Pasaman Regency, where one person was injured.	–	1
28	China, Guangxi, 97 km (60 mi) east northeast of Baise City	4.3	10.0	–	Some buildings were damaged and landslides occurred in Donglan County.	–	–
29	South Georgia and the South Sandwich Islands, offshore, east of the South Sandwich Islands	6.5	11.0	I	–	–	–
30	Indonesia, North Sumatra, 40 km (25 mi) north northeast of Sibolga	5.9	13.2	VII	Two people died of heart attacks and 26 were injured. At least 1,323 buildings were damaged in North Tapanuli Regency, including 19 destroyed by fires. Landslides were also reported.	2	26

=== October ===
October
- Strongest: 6.7 M_{w} Panama
- Total fatalities: 0

Number by magnitude
- 9.0+: 0
- 8.0–8.9: 0
- 7.0–7.9: 0
- 6.0–6.9: 6
- 5.0–5.9: 65
- 4.0–4.9: 443

Date	Country and location	M_{w}	Depth (km)	MMI	Notes	Casualties	
Date	Country and location	M_{w}	Depth (km)	MMI	Notes	Dead	Injured
1	Reykjanes Ridge	6.0	10.0	–	–	–	–
2	China, Hebei, 44 km (27 mi) northwest of Tianchang	4.7	10.0	IV	Some buildings were damaged in the epicentral area, train services were also disrupted.	–	–
5	Iran, West Azerbaijan, 8 km (5.0 mi) east southeast of Khowy	5.6	15.0	VII	Further information: 2022–23 West Azerbaijan earthquakes	–	1,127
5	Peru, Piura, 8 km (5.0 mi) south southeast of Huangala	5.8	35.0	VI	At least 7 houses collapsed, 10 others were damaged, and rockfalls occurred in Sullana. Two people, including a pregnant woman, were injured while fleeing in panic.	–	2
9	Indonesia, Banten offshore, 54 km (34 mi) west of Palabuhanratu	4.9	48.1	III	At least seven houses and a school were damaged in the Lebak Regency.	–	–
9	Central Mid-Atlantic Ridge	6.2	10.0	II	–	–	–
11	Turkey, Osmaniye, 14 km (8.7 mi) north of Osmaniye	5.0	10.0	V	Some houses were damaged in Düziçi, near the epicentre.	–	–
13	Papua New Guinea, New Ireland offshore, 151 km (94 mi) east southeast of Kokopo	6.4	72.0	V	–	–	–
14	United States, Hawaii, 7 km (4.3 mi) south southwest of Pāhala	5.0	9.0	VII	The largest earthquake in a swarm related to the Mauna Loa volcano. In Pāhala, ceilings collapsed and rockfalls occurred. Power outages also affected more than 500 homes.	–	–
16	Costa Rica, Cocos Island offshore	6.3	15.0	IV	–	–	–
19	Thailand, Chiang Mai, 11 km (6.8 mi) north northeast of San Kamphaeng	4.2	2.3	VI	It is the largest earthquake to occur in Chiang Mai province. Three houses, two temples and a school were damaged in Doi Saket district.	–	–
20	Panama, Chiriquí offshore, 62 km (39 mi) south southwest of Boca Chica	6.7	20.0	VI	–	–	–
22	China, Sichuan, 42 km (26 mi) south southeast of Kangding	5.0	12.0	VI	Aftershock of the 2022 Luding earthquake. Additional damage to houses and landslides were reported in Luding County.	–	–
25	South Georgia and the South Sandwich Islands offshore, South Sandwich Islands region	6.3	79.0	V	–	–	–
25	Philippines, Cordillera, 12 km (7.5 mi) east of Dolores	6.4	6.0	VII	Aftershock of the magnitude 7.0 earthquake in July. At least 432 buildings were destroyed and 13,186 others were damaged, rockslides blocked a few roads, and power outages occurred. At least 139 people were injured.	–	139
29	South Korea, North Chungcheong, 9 km (5.6 mi) northeast of Koesan	3.5	9.1	V	At least 19 houses were damaged in Goesan, Chungju, and Eumseong counties.	–	–

=== November ===
November
- Strongest: 7.3 M_{w} Tonga
- Deadliest: 5.6 M_{w} Indonesia; 335–635 deaths
- Total fatalities: 346–646

Number by magnitude
- 9.0+: 0
- 8.0–8.9: 0
- 7.0–7.9: 4
- 6.0–6.9: 11
- 5.0–5.9: 160
- 4.0–4.9: 865

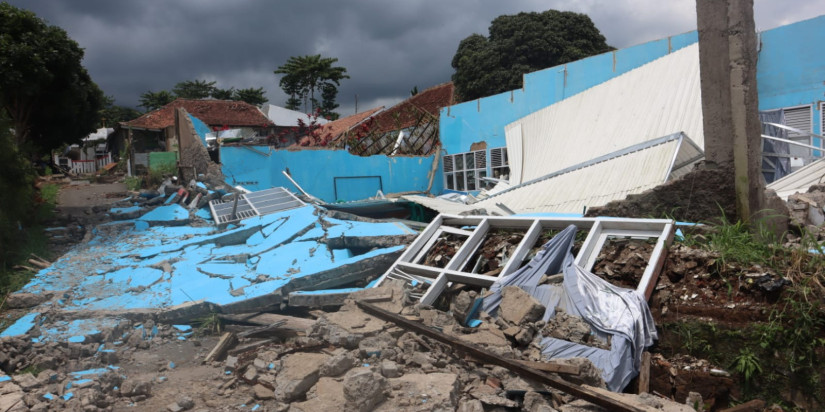
A house destroyed by the 2022 West Java earthquake

Date	Country and location	M_{w}	Depth (km)	MMI	Notes	Casualties	
Date	Country and location	M_{w}	Depth (km)	MMI	Notes	Dead	Injured
2	North Pacific Ocean	6.0	10.0	IV	–	–	–
2	South Georgia and the South Sandwich Islands offshore, South Sandwich Islands region	6.1	10.0	III	–	–	–
4	Turkey, İzmir, 7 km (4.3 mi) east southeast of Karabağlar	4.8	10.0	V	In İzmir, the minaret of a mosque fell, twenty buildings were damaged, and power outages occurred. One person died of a heart-attack and another after falling from a building. Sixty-four people were injured when fleeing in panic, seven of whom were hospitalised.	2	64
4	Mexico, Baja California offshore, 80 km (50 mi) south southwest of Bahía Kino	6.1	10.0	V	–	–	–
8	Nepal, Sudurpashchim, 22 km (14 mi) east of Dipayal	5.7	11.0	VII	Six people were killed when a house collapsed in Doti District, 12 others were injured, 924 houses collapsed, and 5,186 of others were damaged. In the state of Uttarakhand, in neighboring India, one person was injured while fleeing and cracks appeared in several houses.	6	13
9	Italy, Marche offshore, 22 km (14 mi) northeast of Marotta	5.6	8.0	VI	Eleven people were injured, 747 buildings were damaged and train services were disrupted in Ancona. 153 buildings were also damaged in Pesaro Urbino.	–	11
9	Japan, Ibaraki, 6 km (3.7 mi) west southwest of Tsukuba	5.0	56.3	VI	One person was injured after a ceiling collapsed in Kashiwa.	–	1
9	South of the Fiji Islands	6.8	630.4	III	Foreshock of the 7.0 quake 13 minutes later.	–	–
9	South of the Fiji Islands	7.0	660.0	III	–	–	–
9	South of the Fiji Islands	6.6	628.4	II	Aftershock of the 7.0 earthquake 23 minutes prior.	–	–
11	Tonga, Vava'u offshore, 211 km (131 mi) east southeast of Neiafu	7.3	37.0	V	A 12 cm (0.39 ft) tsunami was observed in Pago Pago, American Samoa; 2 cm (0.066 ft) in Nukuʻalofa, Tonga.	–	–
12	Guatemala, Escuintla, 11 km (6.8 mi) southeast of Masagua	5.8	93.7	IV	At least one house collapsed and electricity was disrupted in Comapa.	–	–
12	Fiji region offshore	7.0	587.2	III	–	–	–
12	Nepal, Sudurpashchim, 23 km (14 mi) east northeast of Dipayal	5.2	10.0	V	Aftershock of the 2022 Nepal earthquake. Additional damage was reported in the Bajhang District, and one person died while escaping his home in panic in the neighboring district of Baitadi.	1	–
13	Chile, Biobío offshore, 15 km (9.3 mi) north of Lebu	6.2	18.0	VII	Minor damage to buildings and power outages occurred in Concepción and in Lebu.	–	–
13	Indonesia, West Java, 5 km (3.1 mi) southwest of Cikampek	4.1	11.7	IV	At least six houses were damaged and one collapsed in the West Bandung Regency.	–	–
14	South of the Fiji Islands	6.1	627.4	II	–	–	–
14	Japan, Mie offshore, 84 km (52 mi) south southeast of Toba	6.3	357.4	IV	–	–	–
18	Indonesia, Bengkulu offshore, 202 km (126 mi) southwest of Bengkulu	6.9	25.0	IV	–	–	–
20	Indonesia, East Nusa Tenggara offshore, 34 km (21 mi) south southeast of Kupang	5.1	10.0	VI	At least 30 buildings and several churches were damaged in the Kupang Regency, some of them severely.	–	–
21	Indonesia, West Java, 11 km (6.8 mi) northeast of Sukabumi	5.6	10.0	VIII	Further information: 2022 West Java earthquake	335–635	7,729
22	Solomon Islands, Guadalcanal offshore, 17 km (11 mi) southwest of Malango	7.0	14.0	VII	In Honiara, power outages occurred and many buildings, including an Australian government office and the city's airport were damaged. Four people were injured, one of them after a building collapsed in Burns Creek. A 0.03 m (0.098 ft) tsunami was observed.	–	4
22	Solomon Islands, Guadalcanal offshore, 31 km (19 mi) southwest of Malango	6.0	10.0	V	Aftershock of the 7.0 earthquake approximately 30 minutes earlier.	–	–
22	Mexico, Baja California offshore, 28 km (17 mi) southwest of Las Brisas	6.2	10.0	VII	–	–	–
23	Turkey, Düzce, 16 km (9.9 mi) west of Düzce	6.1	10.0	VIII	Further information: 2022 Düzce earthquake	2	93
29	Greece, Central offshore, 16 km (9.9 mi) northeast of Néa Stíra	4.1	10.0	VI	Many buildings were damaged in Zarakon, some of them severely.	–	–
29	Greece, Central offshore, 14 km (8.7 mi) north of Néa Stíra	4.8	6.3	VI	Many buildings were damaged in Zarakon, some of them severely.	–	–
30	New Zealand, Waikato, 20 km (12 mi) southwest of Taupō	5.3	5.2	VII	In Taupō, items were knocked from shelves and the roof of a shop was damaged, while the section of a wall collapsed away from a house. At the southern end of the township, a 170 m (560 ft) x 20 m (66 ft) section of foreshore collapsed into Lake Taupō. A 1 m (3 ft 3 in) lake tsunami destroyed two pedal boats. This is the largest earthquake in a swarm of hundreds of tremors that started in May.	–	–

=== December ===
December
- Strongest: 6.8 M_{w} Tonga
- Deadliest: 6.4 M_{w} United States; 2 deaths
- Total fatalities: 2

Number by magnitude
- 9.0+: 0
- 8.0–8.9: 0
- 7.0–7.9: 0
- 6.0–6.9: 5
- 5.0–5.9: 135
- 4.0–4.9: 717

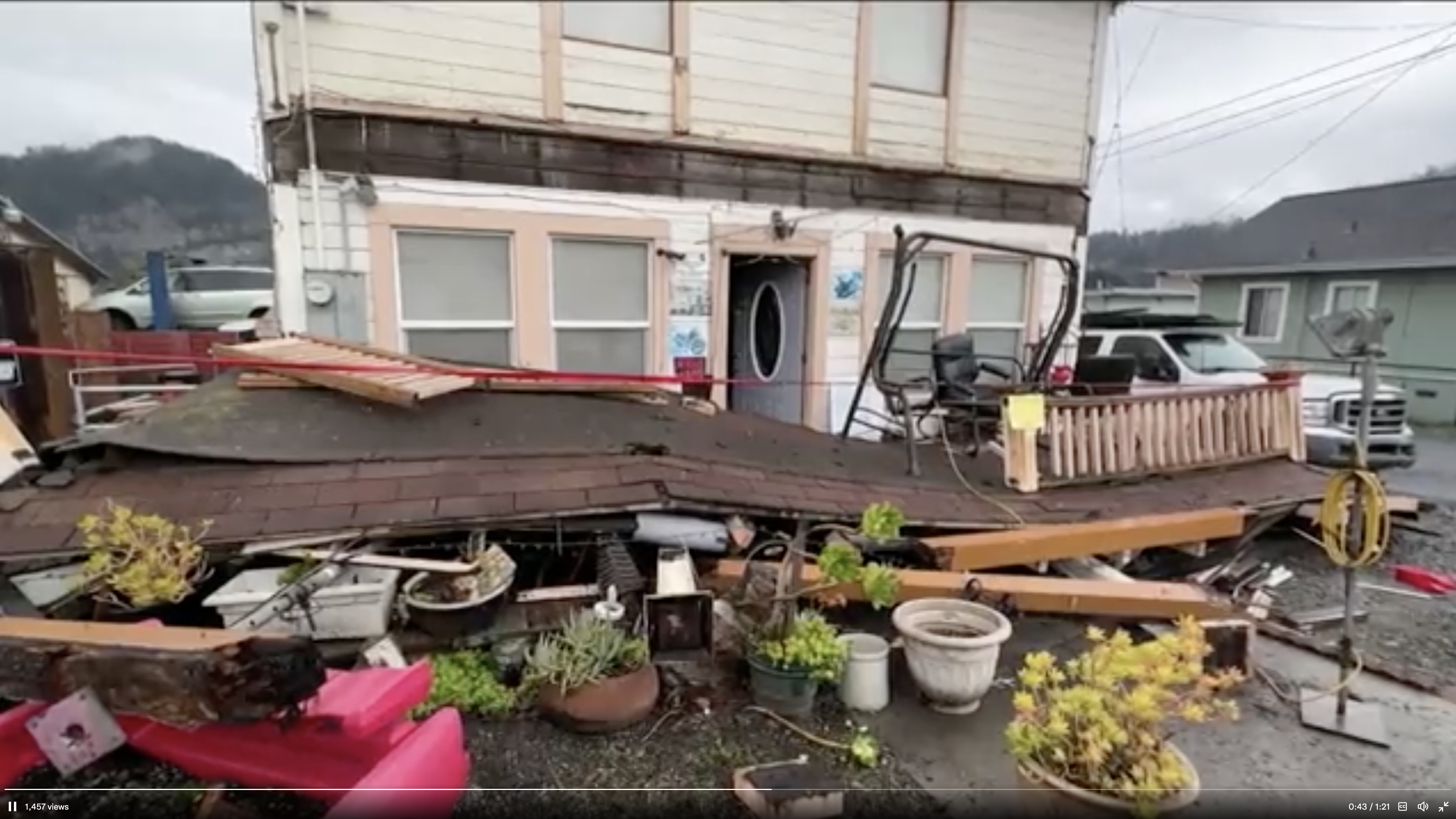
A severely damaged house in Rio Dell, California.

Date	Country and location	M_{w}	Depth (km)	MMI	Notes	Casualties	
Date	Country and location	M_{w}	Depth (km)	MMI	Notes	Dead	Injured
3	Indonesia, West Java, 20 km (12 mi) east southeast of Banjar	5.6	120.0	IV	Many buildings were damaged, including 135 houses and a school in Garut and several others in Cianjur. Two people were slightly injured after the ceiling of their house collapsed.	–	2
4	Tonga, Niuatoputapu offshore, 108 km (67 mi) northeast of Hihifo	6.8	38.0	V	–	–	–
4	Gabon, Moyen-Ogooué Province, 34 km (21 mi) south of Lambaréné	5.5	10.0	VIII	Light damage was observed in Lambaréné.	–	–
7	Philippines, Bicol offshore, 38 km (24 mi) north northeast of Sabang Indan	5.2	9.0	V	At least 22 schools were damaged in Camarines Norte, and at least 40 people were hospitalized due to panic and other health problems.	–	40
8	Indonesia, West Java, 14 km (8.7 mi) northwest of Ciranjang-hilir	5.8	123.7	IV	One house collapsed and 43 others and two schools were damaged in Cianjur and Sukabumi.	–	–
11	Mexico, Guerrero, 3 km (1.9 mi) west northwest of El Ticui	6.0	18.0	VI	Buildings were damaged and power outages affected about 58,000 people in Atoyac de Álvarez.	–	–
11	China, Inner Mongolia, 50 km (31 mi) east of Salaqi	4.6	10.0	II	At least 24 houses were damaged in Hohhot, two of them seriously, and five people were evacuated.	–	–
13	Indonesia, Bali offshore, 21 km (13 mi) north of Amlapura	5.3	10.0	VII	Eight people were injured and 176 buildings were damaged in Karangasem Regency.	–	8
13	Iran, South Khorasan, 46 km (29 mi) north northeast of Tabas	5.1	10.0	VI	Seven villages near Tabas were affected, with over 390 houses damaged in one village alone. Two people were injured.	–	2
14	United States, Alaska offshore, Rat Islands, 324 km (201 mi) west of Adak	6.3	73.0	VI	–	–	–
14	Myanmar, Sagaing, 10 km (6.2 mi) west of Sagaing	4.8	10.0	VI	Many buildings, including some pagodas were damaged in Mandalay, some of them severely, while the ceiling of a school collapsed.	–	–
15	Taiwan, Hualien offshore, 27 km (17 mi) southeast of Hualien City	5.9	12.0	VI	Some buildings were damaged in Hualien City, and five people in Nantou County were injured by rockslides while climbing a mountain.	–	5
18	Turkey, Hatay, 7 km (4.3 mi) northeast of Uzunkavak	4.6	10.0	VI	Five houses were damaged in Kırıkhan, and two minors received slight injuries. At least 50 houses were also damaged in neighboring Syria.	–	2
20	United States, California offshore, 15 km (9.3 mi) west southwest of Ferndale	6.4	17.9	VIII	Further information: 2022 Ferndale earthquake	2	17
21	Indonesia, West Java, 9 km (5.6 mi) south southwest of Kuningan	4.2	10.0	V	Nine houses were damaged in Kuningan Regency, four of them severely.	–	–
24	Iran, Razavi Khorasan, 53 km (33 mi) north northeast of Tabas	5.3	10.0	V	Over 800 houses were destroyed in Korond.	–	–
28	Greece, Central Greece, 6 km (3.7 mi) east of Psachna	5.0	12.3	VI	Twenty houses damaged including 15 in Triada, four in Psachna and one in Kyparissi.	–	–
28	Vanuatu, Tafea offshore, 290 km (180 mi) southeast of Isangel	6.1	10.0	III	–	–	–

== See also ==
- Lists of 21st-century earthquakes
- List of earthquakes 2021–2030
- Lists of earthquakes by year
- Lists of earthquakes
