= 2022 China earthquake =

2022 China earthquake may refer to:

- 2022 Qinghai earthquake, in January 2022
- 2022 Ya'an earthquake, in June 2022

== See also ==
- List of earthquakes in 2022
- List of earthquakes in China
