= 2022 Papua New Guinea earthquake =

Natural disaster in Papua New Guinea

- Location within Papua New Guinea
- UTC time: 2022-09-10 23:46:55
- ISC event: 625210428
- USGS-ANSS: ComCat
- Local date: 11 September 2022
- Local time: 09:46:55
- Magnitude: M_{w} 7.6–7.7
- Depth: 116.0 km (72 mi)
- Epicenter: 6.256°S 146.469°E
- Type: Normal fault
- Areas affected: Papua New Guinea
- Max. intensity: MMI VIII (Severe)
- Casualties: 21 dead, 42 injured

On 11 September 2022, an earthquake of moment magnitude 7.6–7.7 struck Papua New Guinea, in the northern part of Morobe Province. The normal faulting earthquake occurred with a hypocenter depth of 116.0 km (72.1 mi) beneath the Finisterre Range. A maximum perceived Modified Mercalli intensity of VIII (Severe) was estimated. Shaking was widely felt across the country and even in neighbouring Indonesia. At least 21 people died and 42 were injured, mostly due to landslides.

== Background and tectonics ==
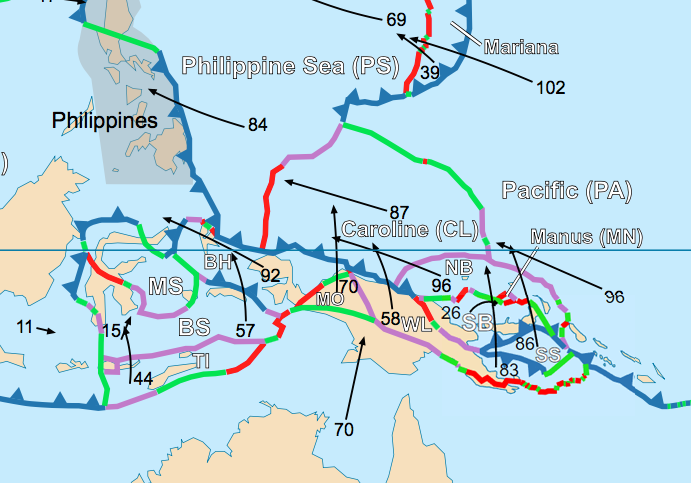
Map of tectonic features around New Guinea

The earthquake occurred in a tectonically complex region where the Australian plate moves east-north-east-wards relative to the Pacific plate. It moves at a velocity of about 100 mm (4 in) a year. Earthquakes in this region are generally associated with the large-scale convergence of these two major plates and with the complex interactions of several associated microplates, most notably the South Bismarck plate, the Solomon Sea microplate, and the Woodlark plate.

The earthquake struck deep beneath the Finisterre Range, a large mountain range mainly consisting of volcaniclastics and volcanic strata that were uplifted 3.7 million years ago. The mountain range is prone to landslides caused by rain and earthquakes. In 1993, a series of highly destructive earthquakes struck the range.

Papua New Guinea is one of the most seismically active areas in the world. It is estimated that over 100 earthquakes of magnitude five or greater occur each year in the country. The seismic vulnerability of Papua New Guinea was recognised in 1982 following the development of hazard maps. However, these maps often underestimated the true level of danger. Current building codes in the country were based on outdated information. Most buildings are constructed with masonry, and are not resistant to earthquakes.

== Earthquake ==
The earthquake measured 7.6 on the W-phase moment magnitude (M_{ww}) scale at a depth of 116.0 km (72 mi) by the United States Geological Survey (USGS). Meanwhile, GEOSCOPE measured it at moment magnitude 7.7 (M_{w}) at a depth of 39 km (24 mi) while the European-Mediterranean Seismological Centre measured it at 7.6 (M_{w}) with a depth of 80 km (50 mi). It was the result of normal faulting at an intermediate depth along either a west northwest–east southeast striking and shallow north–northeast dipping plane or an east striking and steep south dipping plane. The USGS said that normal faulting events of this size are typically about 75 km (47 mi) × 30 km (19 mi) in size (length × width). Considered an intermediate-depth earthquake, such events represent deformation within subducted slabs rather than at the shallow plate interface between subducting and overriding tectonic plates. They typically cause less damage on the ground surface above their foci than is the case with similar-magnitude shallow-focus earthquakes, but large intermediate-depth earthquakes may be felt at great distances from their epicenters. Deep-focus earthquakes, those with focal depths greater than 300 km, also occur beneath Papua New Guinea and the Bismarck Sea to the northeast.

== Impact ==
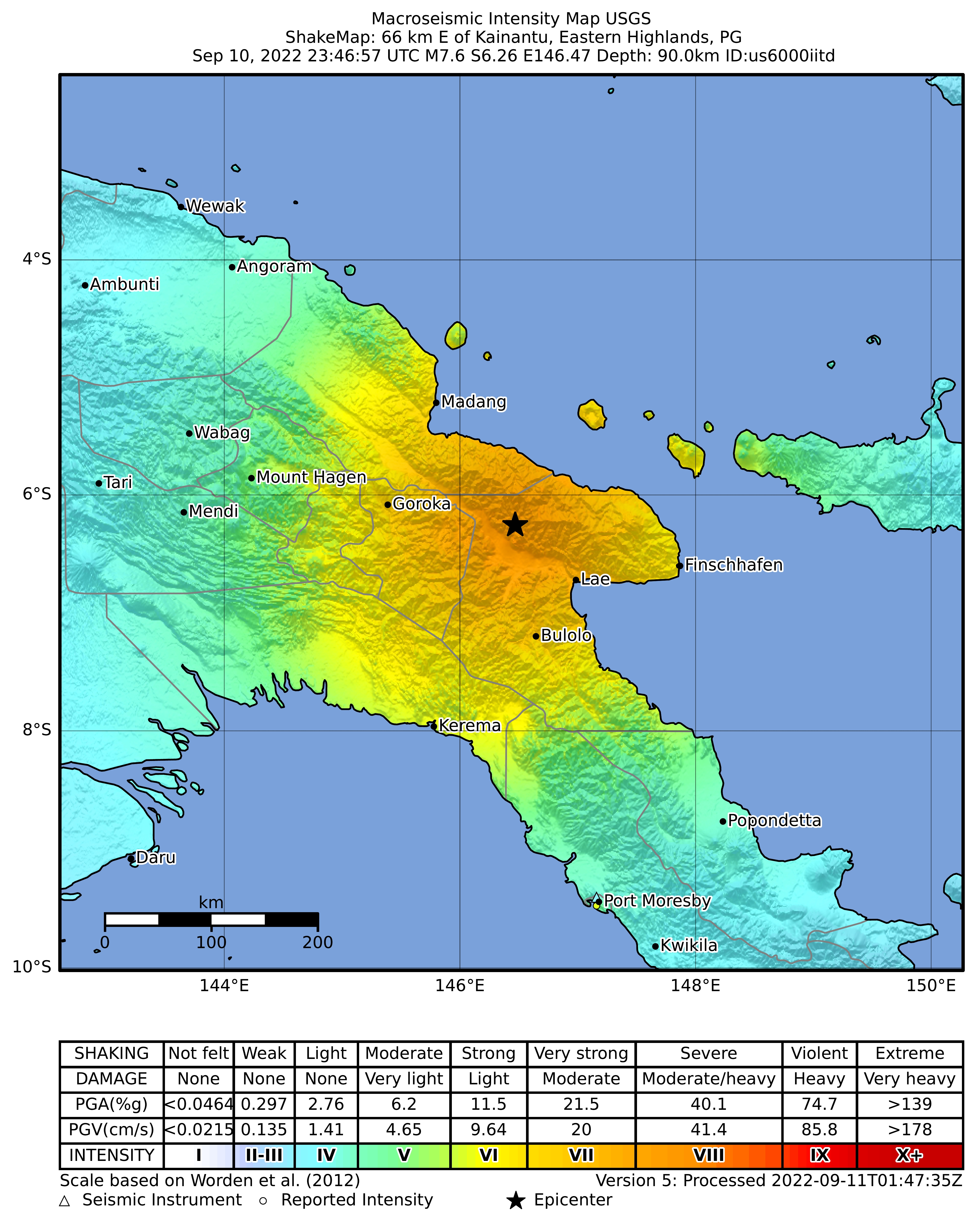
ShakeMap created by the USGS

A total of 21 people were reported killed and at least 42 were injured. Eleven of the deaths occurred in Morobe Province, with five deaths in Madang and five more in the Eastern Highlands. Prime Minister James Marape stated that the extent of destruction and casualties were unknown, and that multiple regions were impacted. According to Kessy Sawang, a local politician, there was serious and a potential for more casualties in settlements around the Finisterre Range and along the coast. She added that many people and homes had been engulfed by landslides. An official at Port Moresby, the nation's capital, said that damage was likely significant for an earthquake of this size. Three deaths were reported at Wau, a gold-mining town. The Morobe Provincial Disaster Director, Charley Masange, reported injuries from collapsed structures and debris. Medical facilities, houses, roads and major highways were damaged. One person was killed in the Rai Coast District due to a landslide. In Kabwum, three people were killed and many were injured. Buildings collapsed in the district and some survivors were airlifted. Officials said that miners were buried by a landslide near Lae. Four people were killed in the Nawae District, including a man who died during a rockfall. A 16-year-old girl was killed by rockfalls in Roku village.

An aerial survey of Morobe province by Mission Aviation Fellowship revealed landslides but damage was limited. Most homes in the mountainous villages remained intact. Inhabitants in the town reported "very strong shaking". Damage consisted of cracked roads, damaged buildings and cars, and items falling off supermarket shelves. Broken pipelines and falling rubble was reported in Kainantu, a town of 10,000 people. There, shaking lasted for over a minute. The mountainous region where there are scattered villages and tens of thousands of inhabitants, may also have been affected. At the University of Goroka, a seven-storey dormitory building sustained large cracks and window awnings fell. Ten students of the university were injured and over 150 were displaced. Shaking was felt across the entire country. It was also felt in the cities of Merauke, Jayapura and Wamena in Indonesia's Papua province.

The Ramu hydropower station at Kainantu was damaged, leading to a complete power outage across Madang and Morobe provinces. Power supply facilities across the region, including in Lae and Madang, were also damaged. The Kumul submarine cable network linking Port Moresby and Madang, as well as the Pipe Pacific Cable linking Port Moresby and Sydney were disrupted. Multiple damage were reported on the cables, causing interruption to Internet services. Cable disruption affected the New Guinea Highlands, Islands and Momase regions. The Highlands Highway was damaged, particularly at Markham and Ramu. An aerial reconnaissance of the Finisterre Range found active landslides. Landslides were also suspected in Rai Coast District, near the earthquake epicenter. A high-voltage power pylon fell, causing a bushfire that burned five homes. At least 15 homes at a government village in Madang were damaged or collapsed. The roof of a cathedral in the city was also damaged. Many inhabitants elsewhere across the province became homeless. In the city of Madang itself, 389 homes were destroyed and 10 people were injured. In Mangiang, Umi/Atzera Rural LLG, 23 houses collapsed. A total of 1,076 houses were damaged or destroyed in the earthquake.

== Response ==
At 23:55 UTC, the Pacific Tsunami Warning Center issued a tsunami threat message warning of the potential for dangerous tsunami waves along the coasts of Papua New Guinea and Indonesia, within 1,000 km (620 mi) of the epicenter. The PTWC announced on 00:25 UTC that the tsunami threat was over. However, it noted that "minor sea level fluctuations in some coastal areas" were possible. The USGS estimated that "some casualties and damage are possible and the impact should be relatively localized" on its PAGER service. Fearing a tsunami, coastal inhabitants evacuated to higher ground after reporting a drop in sea level.

Small airline companies and missionary groups helped airlift injured survivors out of jungle communities. A participant in the operations said that the landscape relief and weather is making airlifting survivors a challenge. Prime Minister Marape instructed national and provincial disaster groups to survey the damage. He added that the degree of damage was expected to be less than that caused by the 2018 earthquake. The K92 mining company in Kainantu temporarily ceased operations to conduct an inspection of the site and ensure the safety of workers. No major damage was reported. However, pumps and pipelines were slightly damaged. Operations resumed after eight hours to repair the damaged equipment. Damage assessments were being made at Yonki Dam.

More than 150 displaced students at the University of Goroka were temporarily housed in the villages of Okiyufa, Asariufa and North Goroka, and also in classrooms. The university also prevented students from entering the damaged dormitory. At Bulolo, an official said that damage was still being assessed on 13 September. Rockfalls were still being reported. Many survivors in the rural mountain communities were still waiting to be rescued by volunteers and private flight companies. DataCo PNG Ltd said that damage evaluation and restoration works were being made along its submarine cable system. They added that customers may experience interruptions in the Eastern Highlands, Lae and Kokopo regions. Schools in Morobe were advised to report damage to district development officials so assistance could be provided, however, no such reports were made yet.

District government officials of Madang and Morobe gathered to discuss plans in distributing relief efforts. The damage extent was still being assessed and affected communities continue to be identified. Officials said food distribution and other essential supplies would be a priority. Authorities in Kabwum said that they were unable to provide assistance because government buildings were destroyed during election violence. Prime Minister Marape said that 10 million Kina would be provided to fund relief efforts.

== See also ==
- List of earthquakes in 2022
- List of earthquakes in Papua New Guinea
