= September 2022 Afghanistan earthquake =

2022 earthquake in Kunar Province, Afghanistan

- Location within Afghanistan
- UTC time: 2022-09-04 21:57:35
- ISC event: 624749335
- USGS-ANSS: ComCat
- Local date: September 5, 2022
- Local time: 02:27
- Magnitude: 5.1 M_{w}
- Depth: 10 km (6.2 mi)
- Epicenter: 34.662°N 70.701°E
- Fault: Reverse
- Max. intensity: MMI VII (Very strong)
- Casualties: 18 dead, 42 injured

On September 5, 2022, a reverse faulting earthquake with a moderate magnitude of 5.1 struck Kunar Province, Afghanistan, close to the city of Jalalabad.

== Tectonic setting ==
Much of Afghanistan is situated in a broad zone of continental deformation within the Eurasian Plate. Seismic activity in Afghanistan is influenced by the subduction of the Arabian Plate to the west and the oblique subduction of the Indian Plate in the east. The subduction rate of the Indian Plate along the continental convergent boundary is estimated to be 39 mm/yr or higher. Transpression due to the plates interacting is associated with high seismicity within the shallow crust. Seismicity is detectable to a depth of 300 km (190 mi) beneath Afghanistan due to plate subduction. These earthquakes beneath the Hindu Kush are the result of movement on faults accommodating detachment of the subducted crust. Within the shallow crust, the Chaman Fault represents a major transform fault associated with large shallow earthquakes that forms the transpressional boundary between the Eurasian and Indian Plates. This zone consists of seismically active thrust and strike-slip faults that have accommodated crustal deformation since the beginning of the formation of the Himalayan orogeny. These earthquakes tend to display strike-slip faulting due to its abundance and high deformation rate.

== Impact ==
At least 18 people died and 42 others were injured. It was felt in Nangarhar, Kunar, Laghman, Kabul and other nearby provinces. The Ministry of Information and Culture said that at least nine fatalities were reported in the Mazar Dara and Shalat areas of Nurgal District in Kunar province. Three people from the district were also injured. Some of the injured were students of Nangarhar University who attempted to escape their dormitory by leaping out of windows. Over a dozen homes were said to be destroyed, most of which were in the province's Nurgal District. Some were previously damaged by flooding that killed over 600 people. In Laghman, 15 homes were totally or partially destroyed and two people were injured.

== See also ==
- List of earthquakes in 2022
- List of earthquakes in Afghanistan
- 2025 Kunar earthquake
