= 2022 Qinghai earthquake =

2022 Earthquake centered in Menyuan, Qinghai province, China

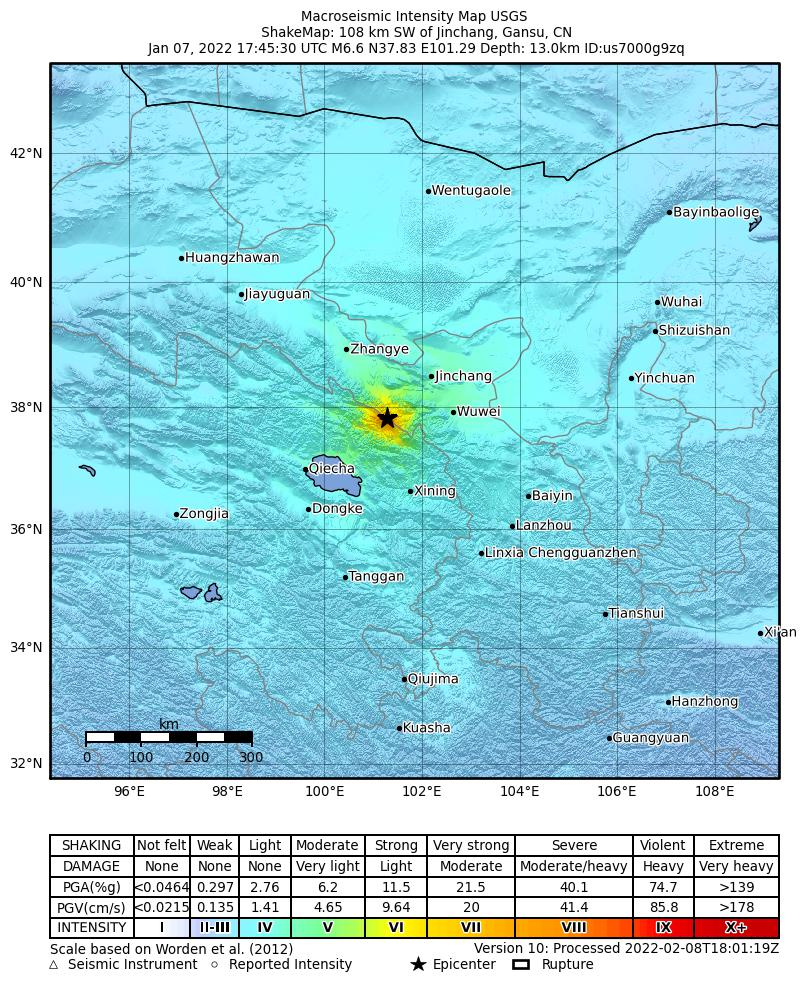

- Location within China
- UTC time: 2022-01-07 17:45:30
- ISC event: 621668769
- USGS-ANSS: ComCat
- Local date: 8 January 2022
- Local time: 01:45 CST (UTC+8)
- Magnitude: 6.6 M_{w} 6.9 M_{s}
- Depth: 13 km (8.1 mi)
- Epicenter: 37.811°N 101.275°E
- Fault: Haiyuan Fault
- Areas affected: China
- Total damage: 3.25 billion yuan (US$510 million)
- Max. intensity: CSIS IX MMI IX (Violent)
- Casualties: 9 injured

On January 8, 2022, a magnitude 6.6 earthquake struck Menyuan County, Qinghai Province near the border with Gansu Province, China. It was the largest earthquake in China since the 2021 Maduo earthquake.

== Earthquake ==
The earthquake occurred as a result of shallow (10 km depth) strike-slip faulting at the northeastern Tibetan Plateau. It ruptured a fault located near the Qilian Mountains. The geological structure responsible was the Lenglongling Fault, a segment of the Haiyuan Fault System. The rupture was mostly confined to 0–8 km within the upper crust. A maximum slip of 3.5 m was estimated at 4 km depth. Surface ruptures were observed for a length of 22 km, and the maximum surface displacement was 2.1 m. The evaluated maximum Modified Mercalli intensity was IX (Violent) near the rupture zone. Intensity VI (Strong) was felt over an area of at least 23,417 km^{2}.

By January 17, 2022, at least 584 aftershocks were recorded, and the largest measured M_{w}5.3. The aftershocks were distributed along a 40 km-long zone trending east–west. Many were detected at depths of 7–14 km, beneath the main rupture area. Only a few aftershocks were detected within 5 km of the crust.

== Damage and injuries ==
The earthquake damaged at least 137 homes and collapsed two walls in Zhangye. Four people in Menyuan Hui Autonomous County suffered minor injuries while evacuating. In total, nine people were reported to be injured, eight of them were discharged from hospitals by the following day. The economic loss amounted to be 3.25 billion yuan (US$510 million).

Some bridges and tunnels on the Lanzhou–Xinjiang high-speed railway sustained serious damage and traffic was halted until repairs could be completed. The Great Wall of China was also damaged by the quake. A 2 m (6 ft 7 in) section of the wall in Shandan County, built during the Ming Dynasty, collapsed. As of January 2022, repair and restoration work on this section was underway.

== See also ==
- List of earthquakes in 2022
- List of earthquakes in China
- 1932 Changma earthquake
