= Montúfar Canton =

- Canton
- Flag

- Location of Carchi Province in Ecuador.

- Location of MontúfarCanton, Carchi Province
- Coordinates: 0°36′36″N 77°50′24″W
- Country: Ecuador
- Province: Carchi Province

Area
  - Total: 379.7 km^{2} (146.6 sq mi)

Population (2022 census)
  - Total: 29,590
  - Density: 77.93/km^{2} (201.8/sq mi)
- Time zone: UTC-5 (ECT)

Montúfar Canton is a canton of Ecuador, located in Carchi Province. Its capital is the city of San Gabriel. The canton's population in the 2001 census was 28,576 and was 30,511 in the 2010 census.

Montúfar is located in the Andes of northern Ecuador. Its capital of San Gabriel has an elevation of 2,878 metres (9,442 ft) above sea level.

The canton is subdivided into the parishes of Chitán de Navarrete, Cristóbal Colón, Fernández Salvador, La Paz, Piartal, and San Gabriel.

== Demographics ==
Ethnic groups as of the Ecuadorian census of 2010:

- Mestizo 93.5%
- White 2.5%
- Afro-Ecuadorian 2.2%
- Indigenous 1.2%
- Montubio 0.3%
- Other 0.2%
