= Chamchamal District =

Chamchamal District قەزای چەمچەماڵ
- District
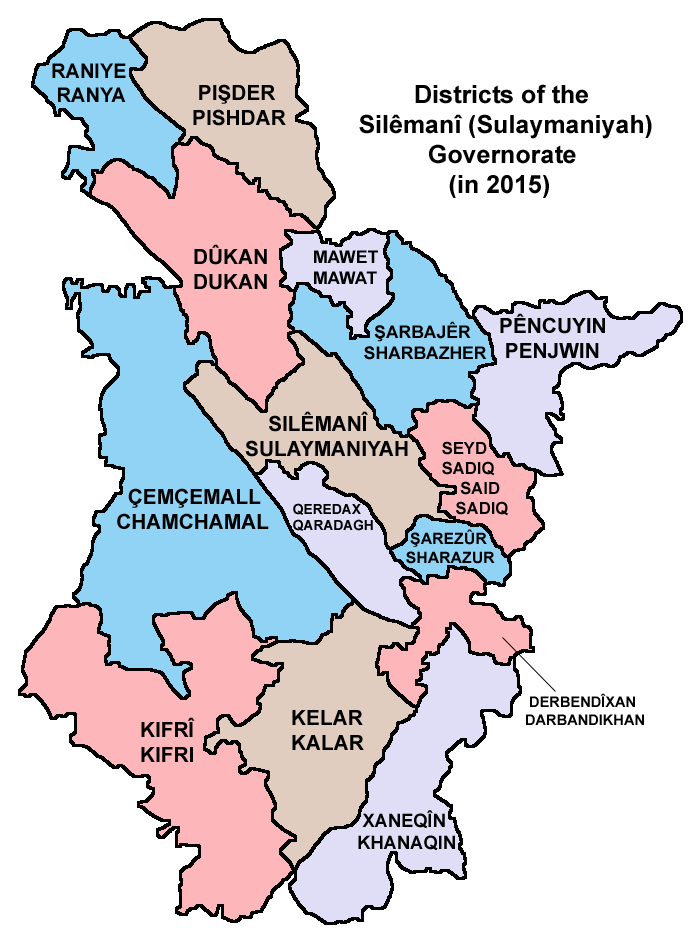
- Districts of the Sulaymaniyah Governorate
- Country: Iraq
- Autonomous region: Kurdistan
- Governorate: Sulaymaniyah
- Time zone: UTC+3 (AST)

Chamchamal District (Kurdish: قەزای چەمچەماڵ, romanized: Qezay Çemçemal) is a district of the Sulaymaniyah Governorate in the Kurdistan Region of Iraq. In the last Iraqi census conducted in 2024, the district had a population of 109,502.
