= San Gabriel, Ecuador =

San Gabriel
- City and parish
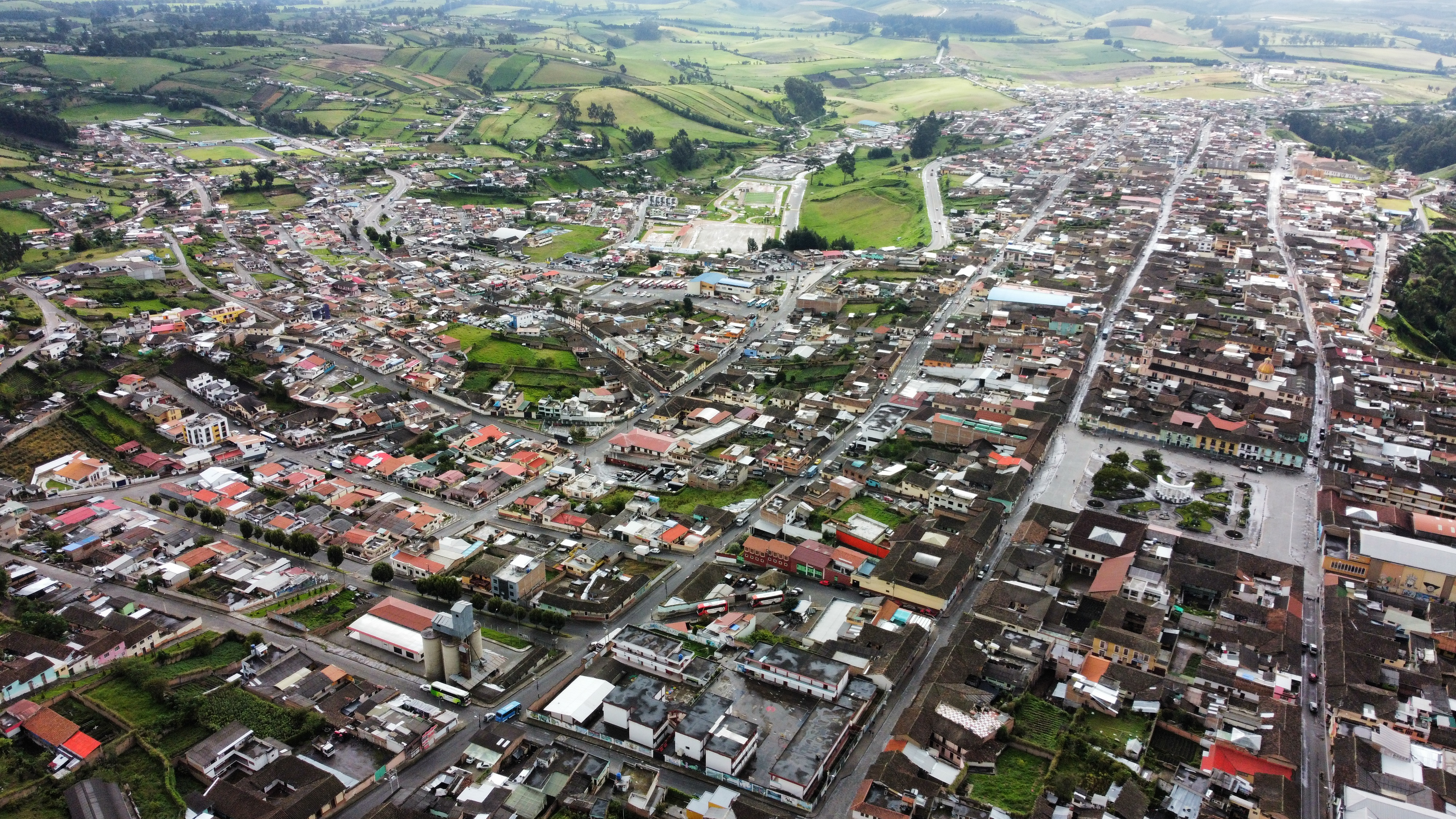
- Aerial view of San Gabriel

- Location within Ecuador
- Coordinates: 0°35′54″N 77°50′07″W
- Country: Ecuador
- Province: Carchi
- Canton: Montúfar Canton

Area
  - City: 4.19 km^{2} (1.62 sq mi)
  - Parish: 145.5 km^{2} (56.2 sq mi)

Population (2022 census)
  - City: 14,497
  - Density: 3,460/km^{2} (8,960/sq mi)
  - Parish: 20,576
  - Parish density: 141.4/km^{2} (366.3/sq mi)
- Climate: Csb

San Gabriel is a name of the capital city of San Gabriel parish in Montúfar Canton in Carchi Province of Ecuador. The city and parish are located in the Andes, at an elevation of 2,878 metres (9,442 ft) above sea level.

The city of San Gabriel had a population of 12,575 in 2001 and 14,487 in the 2010 census. The parish had a population of 19,230 in 2001 and 21,096 in the census of 2010.

San Gabriel was designated a Pueblo Mágico (magical town) by the Ecuadorian Ministry of Tourism (MINTUR) in 2019. It is one of the country's five original Pueblos Mágicos.

== Climate ==
Climate data for San Gabriel, elevation 2,860 m (9,380 ft), (1971–2000)
Month	Jan	Feb	Mar	Apr	May	Jun	Jul	Aug	Sep	Oct	Nov	Dec	Year
Mean daily maximum °C (°F)	17.2 (63.0)	17.2 (63.0)	17.4 (63.3)	17.5 (63.5)	17.4 (63.3)	16.2 (61.2)	15.4 (59.7)	15.4 (59.7)	16.8 (62.2)	17.7 (63.9)	18.0 (64.4)	17.6 (63.7)	17.0 (62.6)
Mean daily minimum °C (°F)	6.2 (43.2)	6.4 (43.5)	6.5 (43.7)	7.0 (44.6)	6.9 (44.4)	6.2 (43.2)	5.8 (42.4)	5.8 (42.4)	6.0 (42.8)	6.4 (43.5)	6.6 (43.9)	6.7 (44.1)	6.4 (43.5)
Average precipitation mm (inches)	63.0 (2.48)	83.0 (3.27)	82.0 (3.23)	113.0 (4.45)	56.0 (2.20)	60.0 (2.36)	53.0 (2.09)	36.0 (1.42)	47.0 (1.85)	98.0 (3.86)	115.0 (4.53)	92.0 (3.62)	898 (35.36)
Average relative humidity (%)	83	83	83	89	84	87	84	83	82	82	83	84	84
Source: FAO

== Notable people ==
- Olavo Yépez, (1937-2021), chess master.

== Sources ==
- World-Gazetteer.com
