= January 2022 Afghanistan earthquakes =

Earthquake in Afghanistan

- Location within Afghanistan
- UTC time: 2022-01-17 11:40:08
- ISC event: 621723883
- USGS-ANSS: ComCat
- ComCat
- Local date: January 17, 2022
- Local time: 16:10
- Magnitude: 4.9 M_{w}
- 5.3 M_{w}
- Depth: 10.0 km (6.2 mi)
- Epicenter: 34.946°N 63.580°E
- Areas affected: Western Afghanistan
- Total damage: Severe
- Max. intensity: MMI VI (Strong)
- Casualties: 30 dead, 49 injured

An earthquake measuring M_{w} 4.9, followed by a 5.3 M_{w} mainshock struck Badghis Province, Afghanistan, on January 17, 2022. The earthquake led to a large number of casualties for the tremor's magnitude, with 30 dead and 49 injured. The earthquake destroyed hundreds of homes in northwestern Afghanistan.

== Tectonic setting ==
Afghanistan is situated within the broad and complex zone of collision between the Arabian plate, the Indian plate and the Eurasian plate. The western part of the country is subdivided into the North Afghan Platform to the north and a series of accreted terranes to the south. The North Afghan Platform has remained relatively tectonically stable since the Variscan Orogeny during the Late Palaeozoic, when it became part of Eurasia. To the south there is a collage of continental fragments and magmatic arcs that have been progressively accreted, particularly in the Mesozoic period. The boundary between these two crustal areas is the major right-lateral strike-slip Harirud (or Herat) Fault, which is far less seismically active than the Chaman Fault that runs through the east of the country. To the north of the Harirud Fault, the near parallel Band-e Turkestan Fault does show signs of recent activity, also in a right-lateral sense.

== Earthquake ==
The epicenter was located near the border with Turkmenistan. It was initially reported with a magnitude of 5.6. It was revised to 5.3 a few hours later. A foreshock with a magnitude of 4.9 occurred at 09:05 UTC, about 9 km (5.6 mi) to the southeast. According to the International Seismological Centre, the earthquake's focal mechanism corresponded to reverse faulting on a north–south striking plane.

== Impact ==
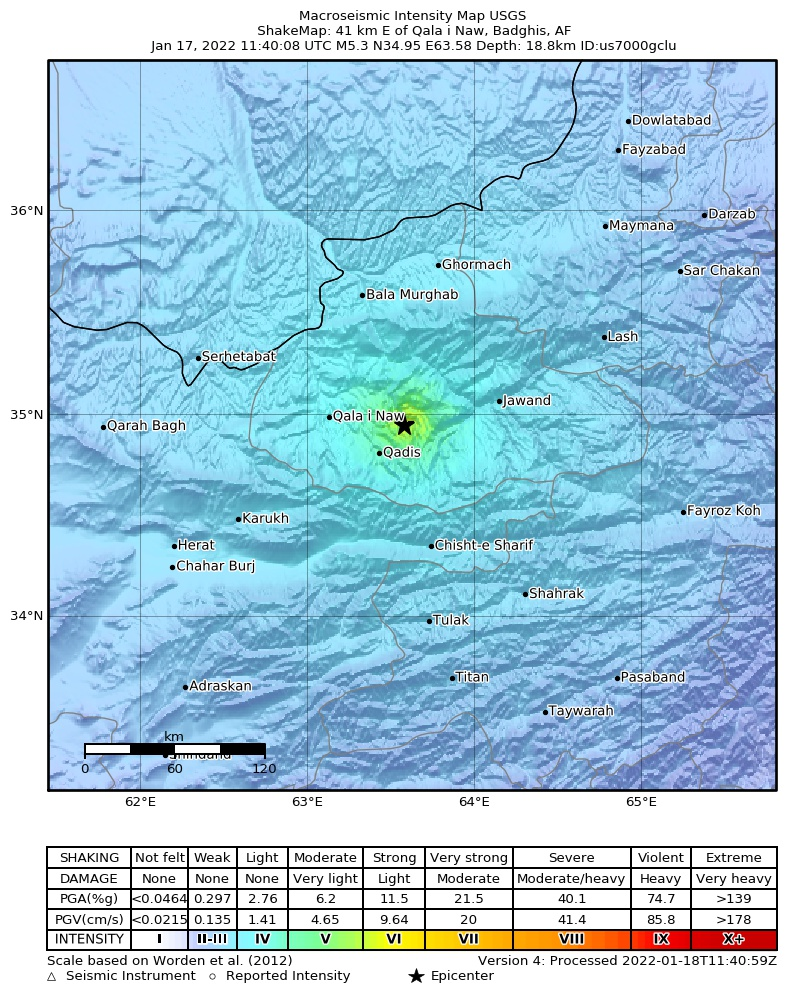
ShakeMap created by the USGS for the second earthquake.

More than 700 homes were destroyed in the earthquake. At least thirty people, including nine women and children, were killed in the earthquake by collapsing homes in Qadis District, half of whom died in the village of Badruk. 49 people suffered injuries and were treated at the hospital.

On the day of the earthquake, the death toll was confirmed to be 12, and rose to 22 a few hours later, then 26. The following day, it rose to 27. It rose to 28 on January 19. On February 1, the final toll reached 30. The reason that so many died was that the earthquake was shallow, and its location was in the west of the country, which makes this a rare event for Afghanistan. The more active east experienced a 5.8 magnitude earthquake three weeks later, killing only two.

In the provincial capital Qala e Naw, where the Modified Mercalli intensity was IV (Light), cracks were observed in the walls of some homes but no major damage was reported.

Afghanistan is already in the grip of a humanitarian disaster, worsened by the Taliban takeover of the country in August 2021 when Western countries froze international aid and access to assets held abroad.

The Minaret of Jam, an 800-year-old UNESCO World Heritage Site, was damaged by the earthquake. Bricks fell from the 65 m (213 ft) tall tower, which, after the earthquake, is at risk of collapsing.

=== Response ===
Rescue workers faced difficulties reaching the affected area due to the lack of roads limiting access. A provincial official in Badghis said between 700 and 1,000 homes were damaged or destroyed. A team of individuals from the Taliban was also at the site to assist in relief efforts. Rescue operations continued into January 19 when workers had spent two nights searching for survivors trapped beneath the rubble. Survivors sought refuge in tents and shelters while some slept in the open. The Taliban said food, aid and tents were being provided to affected residents.

== See also ==
- List of earthquakes in Afghanistan
- List of earthquakes in 2022
