= 1585 Aleutian Islands earthquake =

16th-century seismic event in the North Pacific Ocean

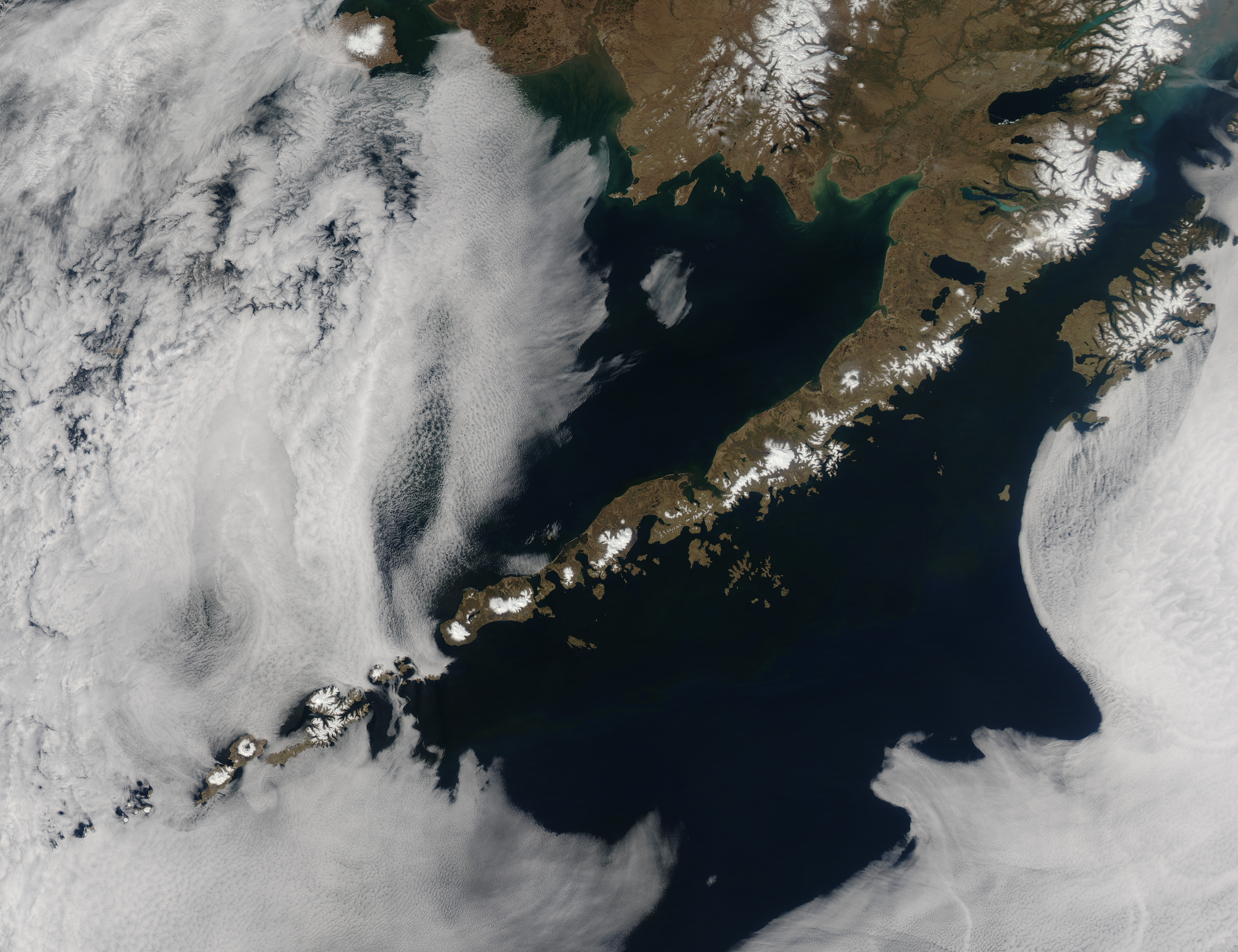
- The epicenter of the earthquake is thought to have been in the eastern Aleutian Islands.
- Local date: 11 June 1585
- Magnitude: 9.25 M_{w}
- Epicenter: Aleutian subduction zone
- Type: Megathrust
- Areas affected: Hawaii, Alaska; Sanriku, Japan
- Tsunami: Yes
- Casualties: Many native people in Hawaii killed

The 1585 Aleutian Islands earthquake is the presumed source of a tsunami along the Sanriku coast of Japan on 11 June 1585, known only from vague historical accounts and oral traditions. The event was initially misdated to 1586, which led to it being associated with the deadly earthquakes in Peru and Japan of that year. A megathrust earthquake on the Aleutian subduction zone in the North Pacific Ocean was hypothesized as the tsunami's source. Paleotsunami evidence from shoreline deposits and coral rocks in Hawaii suggest that the 1585 event was a large megathrust earthquake with a moment magnitude (M_{w}) as large as 9.25.

== Background ==
In 1586, a legend emerged in Japan describing a wave measuring up to two meters which struck near Tokura village in the Motoyoshi District of Miyagi Prefecture. Surviving historical accounts from the period are ambiguous or incomplete, which has made it difficult to identify the tsunami's specific origin. The tsunami was dubbed the "orphan tsunami" or "ghost tsunami" due to the uncertainties regarding the event.

=== Tsunami event ===
According to Kenji Satake, a Japanese seismologist, the legend of the 1586 tsunami should be disregarded because it was a false event. There was no historical documentation of a tsunami striking the Sanriku coast in that year.

In the aftermath of the deadly 1960 Valdivia earthquake in Chile and the associated tsunami in Japan, Seishi Ninomiya, a researcher at Tohoku University, gathered historical accounts of tsunamis along the Sanriku coasts and matched up the tsunami from the 1586 legend with a corresponding earthquake in Peru on 9 July that same year. The 8.1 M_{w} Peru earthquake of 1586 ruptured an estimated 175-kilometre (109 mi) long section of the Peru-Chile megathrust. Historical descriptions of the tsunami that struck locally in Callao reported two very different heights, 3.7 and 24 metres (12 and 79 ft). The latter was determined to be an exaggeration of the tsunami height after much evaluation; a more accurate estimate for the 1586 Peru tsunami is 5 metres (16 ft). Further modelling of the Peru tsunami by a group of researchers in 2006 was unsuccessful in accurately matching the historical descriptions of the wave heights in Peru and Japan. Large tsunamis originating in Chile have been reported in Japan due to the orientation of the tsunami source, but Peru-sourced tsunamis are usually weaker because they are not directed towards Japan, suggesting that the claim of a Peru tsunami causing the 1586 event in Japan is incorrect.

In another tsunami catalog compiled after the 1933 Sanriku earthquake, the author referenced a 1903 publication which stated that a tsunami occurred on 11 June 1585, or Tensho 13th year, 5th month and 14th day. Meanwhile, another tsunami event on 18 January 1586, was recorded, possibly associated with the 1586 Tenshō earthquake (ja). Because the Tenshō earthquake occurred in 1586, the Sanriku tsunami was incorrectly dated to 1586, coincidentally matching the Peru quake as well.

=== Hawaiian culture ===
The Hawaiian Islands have been known to be hit with large, distant-sourced tsunamis and locally sourced megatsunamis. The last known megatsunami occurred more than 10,000 years ago. Throughout the Holocene, tsunamis have repeatedly struck the islands leaving behind evidence of inundation in the form of deposits. Historical legends passed down by the natives have also described tsunamis hitting the island. One of these tsunamis struck Kāne'ohe Bay on the island of Oahu. Archaeological and historical evidences showed that the tsunami occurred sometime between 1040 and 1280 A.D.

A chant composed between 1500 and 1600 described a tsunami-like event occurring on the western coast of Molokai. The chant is believed to be the oldest record of a tsunami in Hawaii.

"The sun shines brightly at Kalaeola which sank into the sea. A huge wave came and killed its inhabitants, scattering them and leaving only Papala'au; their cries are all about."

=== Future threat ===
At least 24 to 40 metres (79 to 131 ft) of slip has been accumulated since the earthquake of 1585 and it is possible for another event of a similar magnitude to occur. If a tsunami were generated, it would require just 4.5 hours of travel time to reach the Hawaiian Islands.

== Evidence ==
=== Hawaii ===
A study of the northwestern coast of Kauaʻi in 2002 discovered evidence of a large tsunami in a layer of buried sand, similar to the tsunami deposits found after the 1946 earthquake.

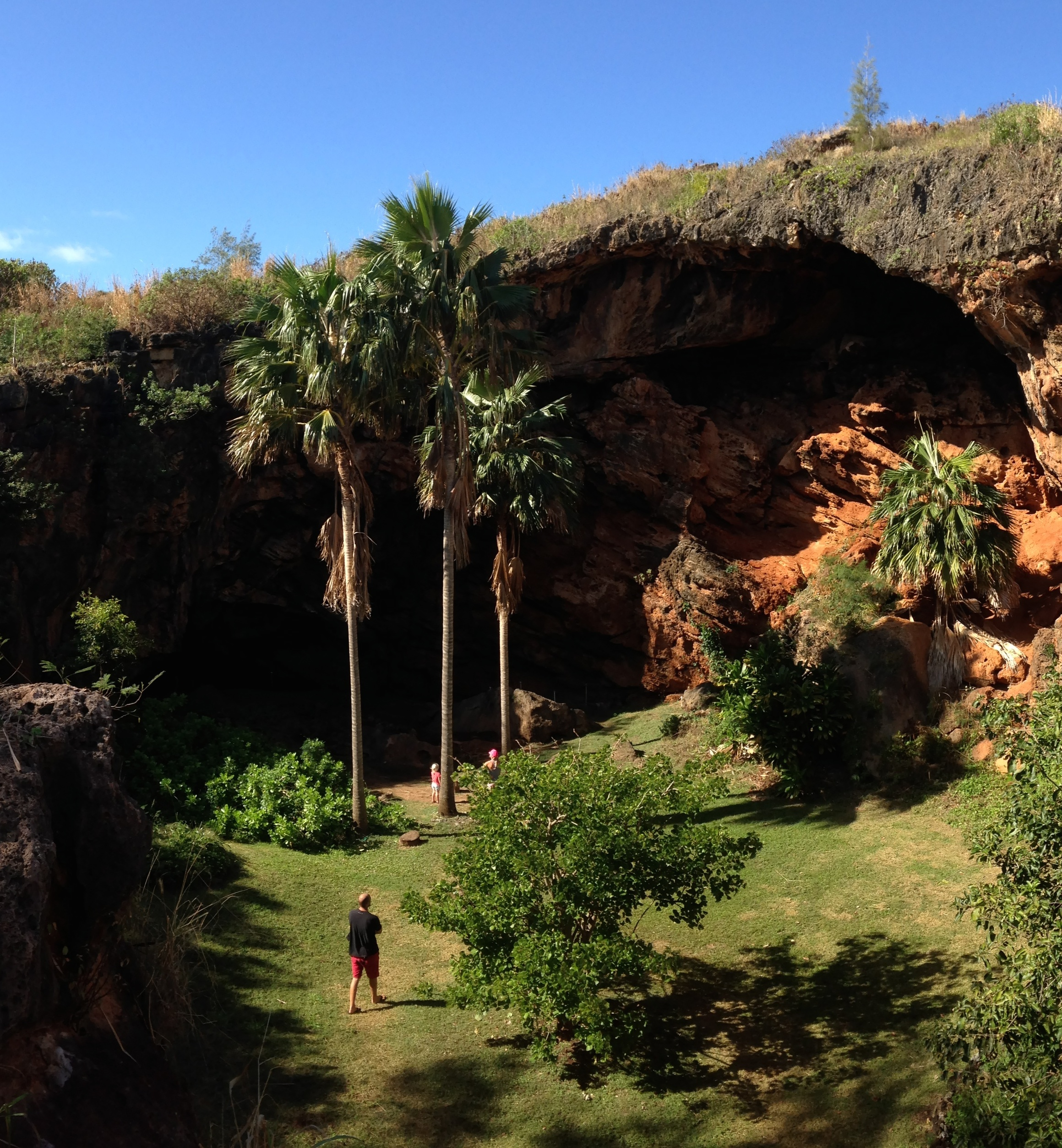
The Makauwahi Cave where there is evidence of a major tsunami-like event in the 16th century.

Earlier in 2001, at Makauwahi Sinkhole in the Makauwahi Cave complex, on the southern coast of Kauaʻi, researchers uncovered a 0.8 to 1-meter layer of deposit during an excavation of the site. The sinkhole is 30 to 35 meters wide and walls 6 to 25 meters high. The allochthonous deposit, consisting of stones and fragmented aeolianite were sourced from a distant location, confirming the occurrence of a major tsunami-like event in the Hawaiian Islands. The state of these boulders, cobbles, gravel, and sand, severely fractured and angular, concluded that they formed during one intense event. Dating of the deposits presented a time period of 1430–1665 A.D..

In a 2014 study of the site led by Rhett Butler, researchers from the University of Hawaiʻi at Mānoa, National Tropical Botanical Garden and Pacific Tsunami Warning Center found the same deposit, 0.8 meters thick. They also measured the bottom of the sinkhole at 7.2 meters above the mean sea level, and location of the sinkhole 100 meters from the coast. The deposit volume is also estimated to be 600 cubic meters.

Based on the location in which the deposit was found, the tsunami must be a very significant event. The layer deposited in the sinkhole was sourced by a tsunami much larger than anything generated by the largest Pacific earthquakes. The largest run-up height in modern times was from the 1960 Valdivia earthquake which tsunami run-up measured 3 meters. None of the recent tsunamis have been able to reach and inundate the Makauwahi Sinkhole, which lies 7.2 meters above sea level at a distance of 100 meters from the shore.

Further research in 2017 revisited the sinkhole to radiocarbon date plant materials in the deposit and found that the tsunami inundation occurred between 1425 and 1660 A.D. Together with the required tsunami run-up heights, the tsunami may have been associated with the misdated Sanriku tsunami of 1586.

=== Elsewhere ===
The Sanriku orphan tsunami may have been associated with deposited materials near Sendai City, Miyagi, which could not be explained by nearby earthquakes. Inscriptions on a monument at Tokura village said that the tsunami struck the northeastern coast of Japan with a height of 1 to 2 meters.

There is paleotsunami evidence in nine locations in Oregon, Washington and British Columbia to show that a tsunami occurred near the Cascadia subduction zone prior to the 1700 event. The next prior event in Cascadia was a less energetic tsunami event inferred to have taken place between 1402 and 1502, with an uncertainty of ± 20 years. This rules out Cascadia as the cause of the 1585 tsunami. Dating of the event however, strongly supported the Aleutian Islands as being the tsunami source.

The closest known historical earthquakes from 1585 to 1586 were the 1604 Arica, 1587 Guayllabamba and 1575 Valdivia earthquakes, which all generated tsunamis along the South American coast. However, no tsunamis from these events were ever measured on the Japanese coasts.

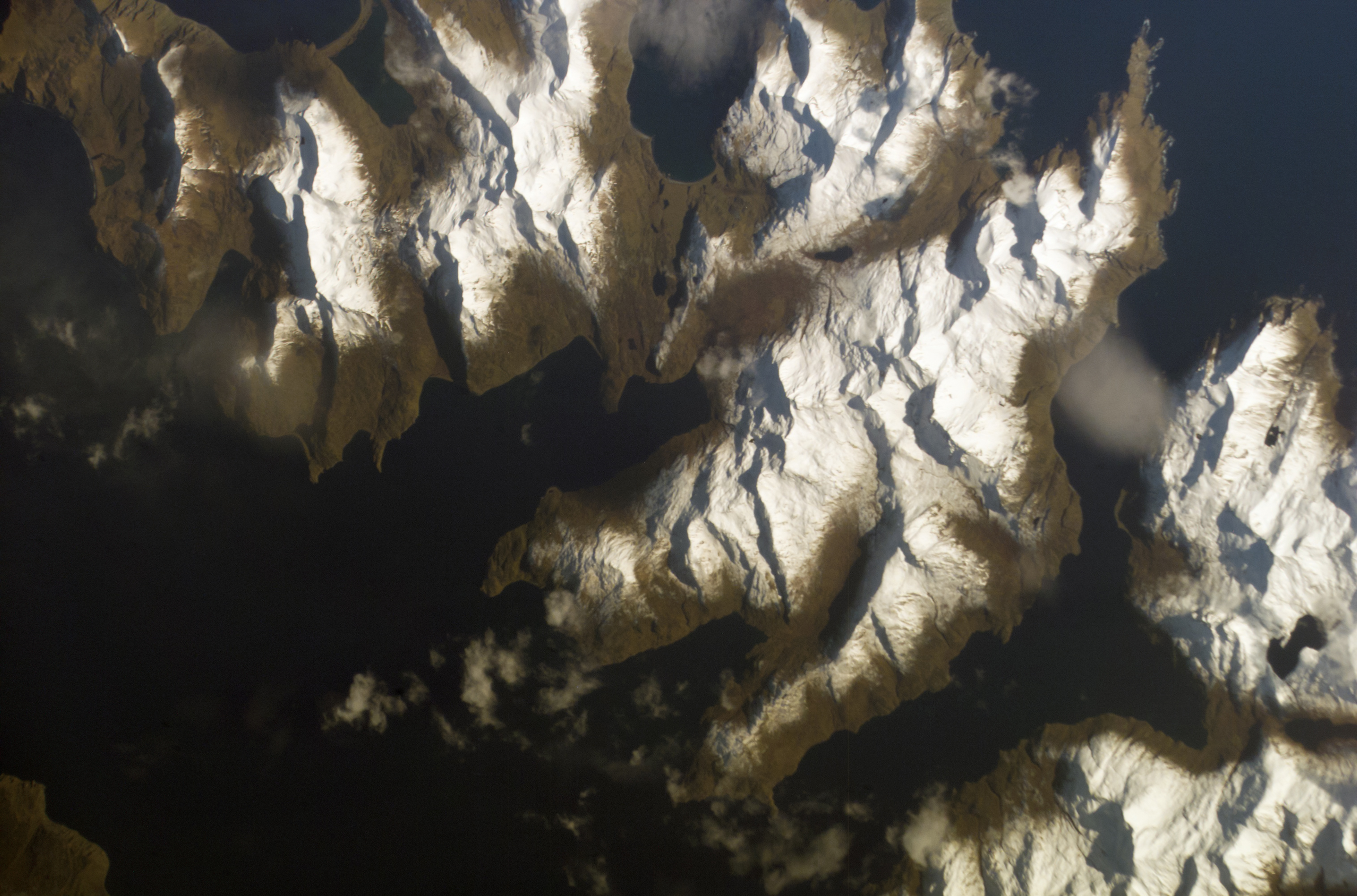
Sedanka Island from space

Paleotsunami studies on Sedanka Island near Amaknak Island found five large tsunami events before 1957. One of these tsunami deposits was found up to one kilometer inland and up to 18 meters above sea level. This tsunami event has been dated at 1530–1665 A.D.

== Earthquake ==
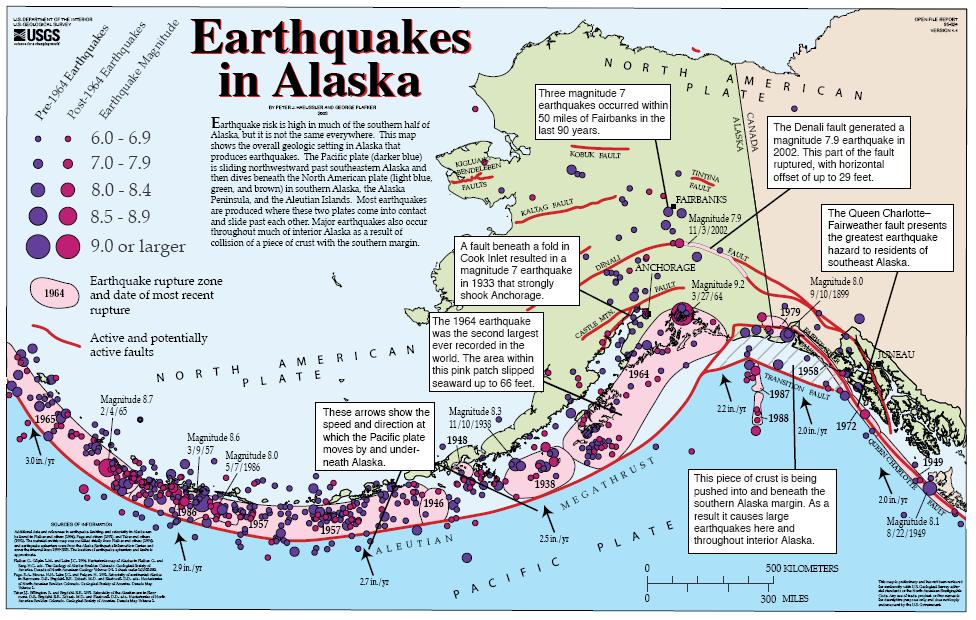
The Aleutian-Alaska megathrust, source of the 1585 earthquake and tsunami

The Aleutian Islands lie near a convergent plate boundary where the Pacific plate meets the North American plate. The location where the plates converge is marked on the ocean floor by the Aleutian Trench. The Pacific plate dives beneath the North American plate along the Aleutian subduction zone which extends for approximately 4,000 km. The subduction zone is a large thrust fault capable of generating large megathrust earthquakes, sometimes tsunamigenic. The 1946 Aleutian Islands earthquake and 1964 Alaska earthquake, measuring 8.6 M_{w} and 9.2 M_{w} respectively, are examples of earthquakes on the subduction zone; both resulted in devastating tsunamis.

In the same 2014 study led by Butler, researchers simulated the tsunami from a 9.25 M_{w} earthquake in the eastern Aleutian Islands, west of the earthquake rupture. The rupture area is 100 km by 600 km with an average slip of 35 meters on the megathrust. Their model was found to be sufficient to inundate the sinkhole. Along the Pacific Northwest coast, the tsunami measured a maximum of 9 meters while the mean height was 3.5 meters. The orientation of the megathrust with respect to the Hawaiian Islands allowed for much directivity of the tsunami energy. The results of the model did not rule out the possibility of other distant tsunami source locations. However, such events would have to greatly exceed the fault slip seen in other historically large events.

== See also ==
- 1700 Cascadia earthquake
- List of tsunamis
- List of earthquakes in Alaska
- List of earthquakes in the United States
