= List of earthquakes 2021–present =

Earthquakes in 2021–2030
- Strongest: Russia; 8.8 M_{w}
- Deadliest: Turkey; 7.8 M_{w} 59,488–62,013 deaths
- Total fatalities: 78,088–81,187

Number by magnitude
- 9.0+: 0
- 8.0–8.9: 4
- 7.0–7.9: 72
- 6.0–6.9: 619
- 5.0–5.9: 8,960

The following is a list of significant earthquakes from 2021–2030, listing earthquakes of magnitude 7 and above, or which caused human fatalities. Deaths due to earthquake-caused tsunamis are included.

For lists of earthquakes by country, which may include smaller and less destructive events than those listed here, see Lists of earthquakes by country.

== 2021 ==
Date	Time (UTC)	Place	Lat.	Long.	Fatalities	Magnitude	Comments	Source
January 14, 2021	18:28	(Indonesia) Sulawesi, Indonesia see 2021 West Sulawesi earthquake	-2.976	118.901	105	6.2	M_{w} (USGS) Centred 32km south of Mamuju, Indonesia, at a depth of 18.0km.	
January 21, 2021	12:23	Pulau–Pulau Talaud, Indonesia	5.007	127.517	0	7.0	M_{w} (USGS) Centred 210km SE of Pondaguitan, Philippines, at a depth of 95.8km.	
February 3, 2021	08:25	Sulawesi, Indonesia	-3.009	118.964	1	4.9	M_{b} (USGS) Centred 37km SSE of Mamuju, Indonesia, at a depth of 10.0km.	
February 10, 2021	13:19	(New Caledonia) Southeast of the Loyalty Islands see 2021 Loyalty Islands earthquake	-23.054	171.601	0	7.7	M_{w} (USGS) Centred 418km WNW of Tadine, Loyalty Islands, New Caledonia, at a depth of 10.0km.	
February 12, 2021	17:01	(China) Tajikistan–Xinjiang border region	38.132	73.569	1	5.9	M_{w} (USGS) Centred 35km west of Murghob, Tajikistan, at a depth of 91.6km.	
February 13, 2021	14:07	Near the east coast of Honshu, Japan see 2021 Fukushima earthquake	37.745	141.749	1	7.1	M_{w} (USGS) Centred 72km ENE of Namie, Japan, at a depth of 49.9km.	
March 1, 2021	22:57	Northern Colombia	6.239	-76.098	3	5.1	M_{w} (USGS) Centred 9km SSE of Urrao, Colombia, at a depth of 10.0km.	
March 3, 2021	10:16	Greece see 2021 Larissa earthquake	39.755	22.176	1	6.3	M_{w} (USGS) Centred 9km west of Týrnavos, Greece, at a depth of 8.0km.	
March 4, 2021	13:27	Off the east coast of the North Island of New Zealand	-37.563	179.444	0	7.3	M_{w} (USGS) Centred 174km NE of Gisborne, New Zealand, at a depth of 20.8km.	
March 4, 2021	17:41	Kermadec Islands, New Zealand see 2021 Kermadec Islands earthquakes	-29.665	-177.834	0	7.4	M_{w} (USGS) Centred 970km NNE of 'Ohonua, ʻEua, Tonga, at a depth of 53.1km.	
March 4, 2021	19:28	Kermadec Islands, New Zealand see 2021 Kermadec Islands earthquakes	-29.735	-177.282	0	8.1	M_{w} (USGS) Centred 962.5km NNE of 'Ohonua, ʻEua, Tonga, at a depth of 26.5km.	
March 20, 2021	09:09	Near the east coast of Honshu, Japan see March 2021 Miyagi earthquake	38.475	141.607	0	7.0	M_{w} (USGS) Centred 27km ENE of Ishinomaki, Japan, at a depth of 54.0km.	
March 23, 2021	21:14	Southern Xinjiang, China	41.812	81.155	3	5.4	M_{w} (USGS) Centred 100km NE of Aksu, China, at a depth of 10.0km.	
April 10, 2021	07:00	Java, Indonesia see 2021 East Java earthquake	-8.562	112.519	10	6.0	M_{w} (USGS) Centred 44km SSW of Gongdanglegi Kulon, Indonesia, at a depth of 82.3km.	
April 28, 2021	02:21	Assam, India see 2021 Assam earthquake	26.782	92.436	2	6.0	M_{w} (USGS) Centred 9km NNW of Dhekiajuli, India, at a depth of 34.0km.	
May 21, 2021	13:48	Yunnan, China see 2021 Dali earthquake	25.761	100.008	3	6.1	M_{w} (USGS) Centred 28km NW of Dali, China, at a depth of 10.0km.	
May 21, 2021	18:04	Southern Qinghai, China see 2021 Maduo earthquake	34.586	98.255	20	7.3	M_{w} (USGS) Centred 389.4km NE of Xining, Qinghai, China, at a depth of 10.0km.	
May 24, 2021	08:37	(Democratic Republic of the Congo) Lac Kivu region, Congo–Rwanda–Uganda	-1.591	29.229	1	4.7	M_{b} (USGS) Centred 9km north of Goma, Democratic Republic of the Congo, at a depth of 10.0km. The fatality is a Rwandan.	
June 10, 2021	08:54	Lake Tanganyika region, Democratic Republic of the Congo	-3.086	28.259	2	5.0	M_{w} (USGS) Centred 87km SW of Kabare, Democratic Republic of the Congo, at a depth of 10.0km.	
June 23, 2021	02:54	Near the coast of central Peru see 2021 Mala earthquake	-12.687	-76.721	1	5.8	M_{w} (USGS) Centred 10km WSW of Mala, Peru, at a depth of 50.6km.	
July 10, 2021	02:14	Afghanistan–Tajikistan border region see 2021 Rasht earthquake	38.959	70.572	5	5.8	M_{w} (USGS) Centred 18km ESE of Rasht, Tajikistan, at a depth of 16.6km.	
July 26, 2021	12:09	Sulawesi, Indonesia	-0.748	121.931	2	6.3	M_{w} (USGS) Centred 99km WNW of Luwuk, Indonesia, at a depth of 11.0km.	
July 29, 2021	06:15	Alaska Peninsula, United States see 2021 Chignik earthquake	55.325	-157.841	0	8.2	M_{w} (USGS) Centred 104km SE of Perryville, Alaska, United States, at a depth of 32.2km.	
August 11, 2021	17:46	Mindanao, Philippines see 2021 Davao Oriental earthquake	6.455	126.742	1	7.1	M_{w} (USGS) Centred 63km east of Pondaguitan, Philippines, at a depth of 65.6km.	
August 12, 2021	18:32	(South Georgia and the South Sandwich Islands) South Sandwich Islands region see 2021 South Sandwich Islands earthquakes	-57.596	-25.187	0	7.5	M_{w} (USGS) Centred 2453.5km SSW of Edinburgh of the Seven Seas, Tristan da Cunha, Saint Helena, at a depth of 63.3km.	
August 12, 2021	18:35	(South Georgia and the South Sandwich Islands) South Sandwich Islands region see 2021 South Sandwich Islands earthquakes	-58.416	-25.321	0	8.1	M_{w} (USGS) Centred 2536.1km SSW of Edinburgh of the Seven Seas, Tristan da Cunha, Saint Helena, at a depth of 48.3km.	
August 14, 2021	12:29	Haiti region see 2021 Haiti earthquake	18.434	-73.482	2,248 dead 329 missing	7.2	M_{w} (USGS) Centred 13km SSE of Petit Trou de Nippes, Haiti, at a depth of 10.0km.	
August 22, 2021	21:33	(South Georgia and the South Sandwich Islands) South Sandwich Islands region see 2021 South Sandwich Islands earthquakes	-60.291	-24.895	0	7.1	M_{w} (USGS) Centred 2545.2km east of Tolhuin, Tierra del Fuego, Argentina, at a depth of 14.0km.	
August 26, 2021	02:14	Sulawesi, Indonesia	-0.854	121.523	1	5.5	M_{w} (USGS) Centred 104km NE of Poso, Indonesia, at a depth of 8.0km.	
September 8, 2021	01:47	Near the coast of Guerrero, Mexico see 2021 Guerrero earthquake	16.982	-99.773	13	7.0	M_{w} (USGS) Centred 20.7km NE of Acapulco de Juárez, Guerrero, Mexico, at a depth of 20.0km.	
September 15, 2021	20:33	(China) Sichuan–Chongqing border region see 2021 Luxian earthquake	29.182	105.391	3	5.4	M_{w} (USGS) Centred 52km WSW of Yongchuan, China, at a depth of 10.0km.	
September 27, 2021	06:17	Crete, Greece see 2021 Arkalochori earthquake	35.252	25.260	1	6.0	M_{w} (USGS) Centred 7km NNW of Thrapsanón, Greece, at a depth of 8.7km.	
October 2, 2021	06:29	Vanuatu region	-21.104	174.895	0	7.3	M_{w} (USGS) Centred 452.5km SW of Nadi, Western, Fiji, at a depth of 535.8km.	
October 6, 2021	22:01	Pakistan see 2021 Balochistan earthquake	30.220	68.014	42	5.9	M_{wb} (USGS) Centred 15.2km NNE of Harnai, Balochistan, Pakistan, at a depth of 9.0km.	
October 15, 2021	20:18	Bali region, Indonesia see 2021 Bali earthquake	-8.328	115.465	4	4.7	M_{w} (USGS) Centred 16km NNE of Banjar Wangsian, Indonesia, at a depth of 10.0km.	
November 14, 2021	12:07	Southern Iran see 2021 Hormozgan earthquakes	27.721	56.065	2	6.0	M_{wb} (USGS) Centred 62km NNW of Bandar Abbas, Iran, at a depth of 7.0km.	
November 14, 2021	12:08	Southern Iran see 2021 Hormozgan earthquakes	27.736	56.077	2	6.3	M_{b} (USGS) Centred 64km NNW of Bandar Abbas, Iran, at a depth of 10.0km.	
November 28, 2021	10:52	Northern Peru see 2021 Northern Peru earthquake	-4.490	-76.846	12	7.5	M_{w} (USGS) Centred 42km NNW of Barranca, Peru, at a depth of 112.5km.	
December 14, 2021	03:20	Flores Sea see 2021 Flores earthquake	-7.630	122.231	1	7.3	M_{w} (USGS) Centred 112km north of Maumere, Indonesia, at a depth of 16.1km.	
December 29, 2021	18:25	Kepulauan Barat Daya, Indonesia	-7.592	127.581	0	7.3	M_{w} (USGS) Centred 121km NNE of Lospalos, Timor Leste, at a depth of 166.9km.	

== 2022 ==
Date	Time (UTC)	Place	Lat.	Long.	Fatalities	Magnitude	Comments	Source
January 11, 2022	01:07	Cyprus region see 2022 Cyprus earthquake	35.229	31.944	3	6.6	M_{w} (USGS) Centred 48km WNW of Pólis, Cyprus, at a depth of 21.0 km. All fatalities were from Egypt.	
January 17, 2022	11:40	Western Afghanistan see January 2022 Afghanistan earthquake	34.946	63.580	30	5.3	M_{w} (USGS) Centred 41km east of Qala i Naw, Afghanistan, at a depth of 18.8 km.	
January 24, 2022	13:16	Haiti region	18.458	-73.337	2	5.3	M_{w} (USGS) Centred 4km south of Anse-à-Veau, Haiti, at a depth of 10.0 km.	
January 24, 2022	14:06	Haiti region	18.499	-73.297	2	5.1	M_{w} (USGS) Centred 5km east of Anse-à-Veau, Haiti, at a depth of 10.0 km.	
February 5, 2022	04:16	Afghanistan–Tajikistan–Pakistan region	36.445	71.117	3	5.8	M_{w} (USGS) Centred 45km SW of Ashkāsham, Afghanistan, at a depth of 209.1 km.	
February 16, 2022	07:12	Guatemala see 2022 Guatemala earthquake	14.193	-91.297	3	6.2	M_{w} (USGS) Centred 0km SSE of Nueva Concepción, Guatemala, at a depth of 83.6 km.	
February 25, 2022	01:39	(Indonesia) Western Sumatra, Indonesia see 2022 Sumatra earthquake	0.233	100.106	27	6.1	M_{w} (USGS) Centred 66km NNW of Bukittinggi, Indonesia, at a depth of 12.3 km.	
March 16, 2022	13:35	Northwestern Kashmir	35.682	75.038	1	5.1	M_{w} (USGS) Centred 68km NW of Skardu, Pakistan, at a depth of 9.1 km.	
March 16, 2022	14:36	(Japan) Near the east coast of Honshu, Japan see 2022 Fukushima earthquake	37.702	141.58	4	7.3	M_{w} (USGS) Centred 57km ENE of Namie, Japan, at a depth of 63.1 km.	
March 27, 2022	04:28	Near the coast of Ecuador	0.909	-79.589	1	5.8	M_{w} (USGS) Centred 9km SE of Esmeraldas, Ecuador, at a depth of 26.5 km.	
March 31, 2022	05:44	(New Caledonia) Southeast of the Loyalty Islands	-22.579	170.354	0	7.0	M_{w} (USGS) Centred 279km ESE of Tadine, New Caledonia, at a depth of 10.0km.	
April 22, 2022	21:07	Bosnia and Herzegovina region see 2022 Bosnia and Herzegovina earthquake	43.061	18.176	1	5.7	M_{w} (USGS) Centred 14km NNE of Ljubinje, Bosnia and Herzegovina, at a depth of 10.0km.	
April 23, 2022	01:39	Poland	50.057	18.628	10	2.7	M_{L} (USGS) Centred 4km NE of Świerklany Górne, Poland, at a depth of 5.0km. All fatalities were underground miners.	
May 12, 2022	21:55	(Peru) Near the coast of central Peru see 2022 Chilca earthquake	-12.360	-76.890	2	5.4	M_{w} (USGS) Centred 11km WNW of San Bartolo, Peru, at a depth of 55.9km.	
May 24, 2022	07:11	Hindu Kush region, Afghanistan	36.118	70.293	2	4.9	M_{b} (USGS) Centred 63km SE of Farkhār, Afghanistan, at a depth of 106.2km.	
May 26, 2022	12:02	Southern Peru	-14.863	-70.308	0	7.2	M_{w} (USGS) Centred 13km WNW of Azángaro, Peru, at a depth of 217.8km.	
June 1, 2022	09:00	(China) Western Sichuan, China see 2022 Ya'an earthquake	30.416	102.989	4	5.8	M_{w} (USGS) Centred 45km west of Linqiong, China, at a depth of 10.0km.	
June 21, 2022	20:54	Afghanistan–Pakistan border region see June 2022 Afghanistan earthquake	33.092	69.514	1,052~1,163	6.0	M_{wb} (USGS) Centred 51km SW of Khōst, Afghanistan, at a depth of 10.0km. Most of the destruction took place in Afghanistan.	
June 24, 2022	01:43	Afghanistan–Pakistan border region	33.007	69.543	5	4.2	M_{b} (USGS) Centred 49km west of Miran Shah, Pakistan, at a depth of 10.0km.	
June 25, 2022	03:37	Southern Iran	26.725	54.261	1	5.6	M_{w} (USGS) Centred 30km NE of Kīsh, Iran, at a depth of 10.0km.	
July 1, 2022	21:32	(Iran) Southern Iran see 2022 Hormozgan earthquakes	26.935	55.254	7	6.0	M_{w} (USGS) Centred 55km NE of Bandar–e Lengeh, Iran, at a depth of 16.0km.	
July 1, 2022	23:25	(Iran) Southern Iran see 2022 Hormozgan earthquakes	26.899	55.321	7	6.0	M_{wb} (USGS) Centred 57km NE of Bandar–e Lengeh, Iran, at a depth of 10.0km.	
July 5, 2022	08:47	Southwestern Siberia, Russia	53.807	88.093	2	4.3	M_{b} (USGS) Centred 12km north of Mezhdurechensk, Russia, at a depth of 5.0km. All fatalities are underground miners.	
July 14, 2022	22:30	Near the coast of Ecuador	-2.040	-79.811	1	5.7	M_{w} (USGS) Centred 12km SW of Samborondón, Ecuador, at a depth of 73.0km.	
July 27, 2022	00:43	(Philippines) Luzon, Philippines see 2022 Luzon earthquake	17.521	120.818	11	7.0	M_{w} (USGS) Centred 11km NE of Bantay, Philippines, at a depth of 33.7km.	
September 4, 2022	21:57	Hindu Kush region, Afghanistan see September 2022 Afghanistan earthquake	34.662	70.702	18	5.1	M_{w} (USGS) Centred 34km NE of Jalalabad, Afghanistan, at a depth of 10.0km.	
September 5, 2022	04:52	(China) Western Sichuan, China see 2022 Luding earthquake	29.726	102.279	93 dead 25 missing	6.6	M_{w} (USGS) Centred 43km SE of Kangding, China, at a depth of 10.0km.	
September 6, 2022	07:04	Hindu Kush region, Afghanistan	36.649	70.629	6	4.8	M_{b} (USGS) Centred 30km SW of Jurm, Afghanistan, at a depth of 70.8km.	
September 10, 2022	23:46	Eastern New Guinea region, Papua New Guinea see 2022 Papua New Guinea earthquake	-6.256	146.469	21	7.6	M_{w} (USGS) Centred 66km east of Kainantu, Papua New Guinea, at a depth of 90.0km.	
September 14, 2022	11:04	(New Caledonia) Southeast of the Loyalty Islands	-21.191	170.240	0	7.0	M_{w} (USGS) Centred 208km SSE of Isangel, Vanuatu, at a depth of 144.9km.	
September 18, 2022	06:44	(Taiwan) Taiwan see 2022 Taitung earthquakes	23.159	121.316	1	6.9	M_{w} (USGS) Centred 86km SE of Lugu, Taiwan, at a depth of 10.0km.	
September 19, 2022	18:05	(Mexico) Michoacán, Mexico see 2022 Michoacán earthquake	18.455	-102.956	2	7.6	M_{w} (USGS) Centred 35km SSW of Aquila, Mexico, at a depth of 26.9km.	
September 22, 2022	06:16	(Mexico) Michoacán, Mexico see 2022 Michoacán earthquake	18.263	-102.955	3	6.8	M_{w} (USGS) Centred 55km SSW of Aquila, Mexico, at a depth of 20.0km.	
September 30, 2022	19:28	Northern Sumatra, Indonesia	2.109	98.928	2	5.9	M_{w} (USGS) Centred 43km NNE of Sibolga, Indonesia, at a depth of 21.2km.	
November 4, 2022	00:29	Western Turkey	38.357	27.218	2	4.8	M_{wr} (USGS) Centred 7km ESE of Karabağlar, Turkey, at a depth of 10.0km.	
November 8, 2022	20:27	Nepal see 2022 Nepal earthquake	29.274	81.149	6	5.7	M_{w} (USGS) Centred 20km east of Dipayal, Nepal, at a depth of 18.1km.	
November 9, 2022	09:51	South of the Fiji Islands	-26.044	178.381	0	7.0	M_{w} (USGS) Centred 849km SW of Vaini, Tongatapu, Tonga, at a depth of 665.3km.	
November 11, 2022	10:48	Tonga region	-19.318	-172.100	0	7.3	M_{w} (USGS) Centred 211km ESE of Neiafu, Tonga, at a depth of 24.8km.	
November 12, 2022	07:09	Fiji region	-20.116	-178.36	0	7.0	M_{w} (USGS) Centred 333.9km SE of Levuka, Eastern, Fiji, at a depth of 587.2km.	
November 12, 2022	14:27	Nepal see 2022 Nepal earthquake	29.330	81.168	1	5.2	M_{w} (USGS) Centred 23km ENE of Dipayal, Nepal, at a depth of 10.0km.	
November 21, 2022	06:21	(Indonesia) Java, Indonesia see 2022 West Java earthquake	-6.853	107.095	335~635 dead 5 missing	5.6	M_{w} (USGS) Centred 18km WSW of Ciranjang–hilir, Indonesia, at a depth of 10.0km.	
November 22, 2022	02:03	Solomon Islands	-9.812	159.596	0	7.0	M_{w} (USGS) Centred 18km SW of Malango, Solomon Islands, at a depth of 15.0km.	
November 23, 2022	01:08	(Turkey) Western Turkey see 2022 Düzce earthquake	40.836	30.983	2	6.1	M_{w} (USGS) Centred 15km west of Düzce, Turkey, at a depth of 10.0km.	
December 20, 2022	10:34	(United States) Near the coast of northern California, United States see 2022 Ferndale earthquake	40.525	-124.423	2	6.4	M_{w} (USGS) Centred 15km WSW of Ferndale, California, United States, at a depth of 17.9km.	

== 2023 ==
Date	Time (UTC)	Place	Lat.	Long.	Fatalities	Magnitude	Comments	Source
January 8, 2023	12:32	Vanuatu	-14.938	166.878	0	7.0	M_{w} (USGS) Centred 23km WNW of Port–Olry, Vanuatu, at a depth of 27.7km.	
January 9, 2023	17:47	(Indonesia) Pulau Pulau Tanimbar, Indonesia see 2023 Maluku earthquake	-7.049	130.038	0	7.6	M_{w} (USGS) Centred 339.3km WSW of Tual, Maluku, Indonesia, at a depth of 105.1km.	
January 12, 2023	09:37	Poland–Czech Republic–Slovakia Border Region	49.865	18.568	1	2.8	M_{L} (USGS) Centred 2km NW of Karviná, Czech Republic, at a depth of 5.0km.	
January 18, 2023	06:06	Molucca Sea	2.735	127.060	0	7.0	M_{wc} (USGS) Centred 153km NW of Tobelo, Indonesia, at a depth of 28.6km.	
January 24, 2023	08:58	Nepal	29.597	81.652	4	5.4	M_{b} (USGS) Centred 62km NW of Jumla, Nepal, at a depth of 20.3km.	
January 28, 2023	18:14	Turkey–Iran border region see 2022–23 West Azerbaijan earthquakes	38.425	44.899	3	5.9	M_{w} (USGS) Centred 14km SSW of Khowy, Iran, at a depth of 10.0km.	
February 6, 2023	01:17	Central Turkey see 2023 Turkey–Syria earthquakes	37.166	37.032	59,488~62,013 dead 140 missing	7.8	M_{w} (USGS) Centred 26km east of Nurdağı, Turkey, at a depth of 17.9km.	
February 6, 2023	10:24	Central Turkey see 2023 Turkey–Syria earthquakes	38.024	37.203	59,488~62,013 dead 140 missing	7.5	M_{w} (USGS) Centred 4km SSE of Ekinözü, Turkey, at a depth of 10.0km.	
February 8, 2023	18:58	Lebanon – Syria region	34.153	36.232	1 dead 1 missing	4.1	M_{b} (USGS) Centred 16km north of Baalbek, Lebanon, at a depth of 10.0km. The fatality was reported in Syria.	
February 9, 2023	06:28	Near the north coast of Papua, Indonesia	-2.635	140.557	4	5.1	M_{w} (USGS) Centred 9km WSW of Abepura, Indonesia, at a depth of 22.0km.	
February 20, 2023	17:04	Turkey–Syria border region	36.109	36.017	11	6.3	M_{w} (USGS) Centred 3km SSW of Uzunbağ, Turkey, at a depth of 16.0km.	
February 27, 2023	09:04	Eastern Turkey	38.229	38.283	2	5.2	M_{w} (USGS) Centred 8km SSE of Yeşilyurt, Turkey, at a depth of 10.0km.	
March 16, 2023	00:56	(New Zealand) Kermadec Islands region	-30.115	-176.112	0	7.0	M_{w} (USGS) Centred 982.8km south of 'Ohonua, ʻEua, Tonga, at a depth of 22.1km.	
March 18, 2023	17:12	(Ecuador) Near the coast of Ecuador see 2023 Guayas earthquake	-2.837	-79.844	18	6.8	M_{w} (USGS) Centred 8km NNW of Baláo, Ecuador, at a depth of 65.8km.	
March 21, 2023	16:47	(Afghanistan) Hindu Kush region, Afghanistan see 2023 Badakhshan earthquake	36.523	70.979	21	6.5	M_{w} (USGS) Centred 40km SSE of Jurm, Afghanistan, at a depth of 187.6km.	
March 31, 2023	17:01	Afghanistan–Pakistan border region	30.396	66.726	3	3.5	M_{b} (USGS) Centred 32km SW of Pishin, Pakistan, at a depth of 10.0km.	
April 2, 2023	18:04	New Guinea, Papua New Guinea see 2023 Papua New Guinea earthquake	-4.326	143.159	8	7.0	M_{w} (USGS) Centred 39km ESE of Ambunti, Papua New Guinea, at a depth of 70.0km.	
April 14, 2023	09:55	Java, Indonesia	-6.026	112.033	1	7.0	M_{w} (USGS) Centred 96km north of Tuban, Indonesia, at a depth of 594.0km.	
April 24, 2023	00:41	Kermadec Islands, New Zealand	-29.955	-177.838	0	7.1	M_{w} (USGS) Centred 921.1km NNE of Hicks Bay, Gisborne, New Zealand, at a depth of 49.0km.	
April 24, 2023	20:00	Kepulauan Batu, Indonesia	-0.781	98.534	0	7.1	M_{w} (USGS) Centred 170 km SSE of Teluk Dalam, Indonesia, at a depth of 15.5km.	
May 5, 2023	05:42	(Japan) Near the west coast of Honshu, Japan see 2023 Ishikawa earthquake	37.540	137.305	1	6.2	M_{w} (USGS) Centred 49.5km NE of Anamizu, Ishikawa, Japan, at a depth of 8.7km.	
May 10, 2023	16:02	Tonga	-15.600	-174.608	0	7.6	M_{w} (USGS) Centred 95km WNW of Hihifo, Tonga, at a depth of 210.1km.	
May 19, 2023	02:57	(New Caledonia) Southeast of the Loyalty Islands	-23.185	170.763	0	7.7	M_{w} (USGS) Centred 339.7km east of Vao, South Province, New Caledonia, at a depth of 18.0km.	
May 20, 2023	01:51	(New Caledonia) Southeast of the Loyalty Islands	-23.062	170.456	0	7.1	M_{w} (USGS) Centred 306.6km east of Vao, South Province, New Caledonia, at a depth of 36.0km.	
May 28, 2023	05:49	Afghanistan–Tajikistan–Pakistan region	36.608	71.066	1	5.3	M_{w} (USGS) Centred 35km SE of Jurm, Afghanistan, at a depth of 228.0km.	
June 6, 2023	09:11	Haiti region	18.702	-74.235	4	4.9	M_{w} (USGS) Centred 9km NE of Les Abricots, Haiti, at a depth of 10.0km.	
June 7, 2023	09:53	Near the south coast of Myanmar	16.861	95.542	3	4.8	M_{b} (USGS) Centred 18km NW of Maubin, Myanmar, at a depth of 10.0km.	
June 15, 2023	18:06	South of the Fiji Islands	-22.982	-177.208	0	7.2	M_{w} (USGS) Centred 280km SW of Houma, Tonga, at a depth of 167.4km.	
June 30, 2023	12:57	Java, Indonesia	-8.653	110.018	1	5.9	M_{w} (USGS) Centred 83km SSW of Srandakan, Indonesia, at a depth of 71.0km.	
July 16, 2023	06:48	Alaska Peninsula, United States	54.460	-160.760	0	7.2	M_{w} (USGS) Centred 98km south of Sand Point, Alaska, United States, at a depth of 32.6km.	
August 17, 2023	17:04	Colombia see 2023 central Colombia earthquakes	4.418	-73.511	2	6.1	M_{w} (USGS) Centred 16km north of Cumaral, Colombia, at a depth of 10.0km.	
August 17, 2023	17:17	Colombia see 2023 central Colombia earthquakes	4.214	-73.607	2	5.6	M_{w} (USGS) Centred 2km east of Restrepo, Colombia, at a depth of 10.0km.	
August 28, 2023	19:55	(Indonesia) Bali Sea	-6.788	116.548	0	7.1	M_{w} (USGS) Centred 181km NNE of Gili Air, Indonesia, at a depth of 513.5km.	
September 8, 2023	22:11	(Morocco) Morocco see 2023 Al Haouz earthquake	31.110	-8.440	2,960	6.8	M_{w} (USGS) Centred 56km west of Oukaïmedene, Morocco, at a depth of 18.5km.	
September 18, 2023	03:10	Northern Italy	44.045	11.684	1	5.1	M_{w} (USGS) Centred 5km SW of Tredozio, Italy, at a depth of 10.0km.	
October 3, 2023	09:21	Nepal	29.499	81.253	1	5.7	M_{w} (USGS) Centred 40km NE of Dipayal, Nepal, at a depth of 20.1km.	
October 7, 2023	06:41	(Afghanistan) Western Afghanistan see 2023 Herat earthquakes	34.610	61.924	1,482	6.3	M_{w} (USGS) Centred 33km NNE of Zindah Jān, Afghanistan, at a depth of 14.0km.	
October 7, 2023	07:12	(Afghanistan) Western Afghanistan see 2023 Herat earthquakes	34.574	61.904	1,482	6.3	M_{w} (USGS) Centred 29km NNE of Zindah Jān, Afghanistan, at a depth of 10.0km.	
October 7, 2023	08:34	Eastern New Guinea region, Papua New Guinea	-5.600	146.132	1	6.7	M_{w} (USGS) Centred 56km SE of Madang, Papua New Guinea, at a depth of 53.5km.	
October 7, 2023	08:40	Eastern New Guinea region, Papua New Guinea	-5.507	146.198	1	6.9	M_{w} (USGS) Centred 55km SE of Madang, Papua New Guinea, at a depth of 76.0km.	
October 11, 2023	00:41	(Afghanistan) Western Afghanistan see 2023 Herat earthquakes	34.557	62.045	3	6.3	M_{w} (USGS) Centred 27km NNW of Herāt, Afghanistan, at a depth of 9.0km.	
October 15, 2023	03:36	(Afghanistan) Western Afghanistan see 2023 Herat earthquakes	34.609	62.112	4	6.3	M_{w} (USGS) Centred 30km NNW of Herāt, Afghanistan, at a depth of 6.3km.	
November 3, 2023	18:02	Nepal see 2023 Nepal earthquake	28.848	82.187	153	5.7	M_{w} (USGS) Centred 46km east of Dailekh, Nepal, at a depth of 16.5km.	
November 8, 2023	04:53	Banda Sea	-6.456	129.513	0	7.1	M_{w} (USGS) Centred 340.8km SSE of Ambon, Maluku, Indonesia, at a depth of 10.0km.	
November 17, 2023	08:14	(Philippines) Mindanao, Philippines see 2023 Sarangani earthquake	5.587	125.051	11	6.7	M_{w} (USGS) Centred 26km WSW of Burias, Philippines, at a depth of 78.0km.	
November 22, 2023	02:48	Halmahera, Indonesia	1.799	127.166	1	6.0	M_{w} (USGS) Centred 94km west of Tobelo, Indonesia, at a depth of 102.0km.	
December 2, 2023	14:37	(Philippines) Mindanao, Philippines see December 2023 Mindanao earthquake	8.527	126.416	3	7.6	M_{w} (USGS) Centred 21.3km NE of Hinatuan, Caraga, Philippines, at a depth of 32.8km.	
December 7, 2023	12:56	Vanuatu	-20.659	169.206	0	7.1	M_{w} (USGS) Centred 123km south of Isangel, Vanuatu, at a depth of 48.4km.	
December 18, 2023	15:59	(China) Gansu–Qinghai border region, China see 2023 Jishishan earthquake	35.743	102.827	151	5.9	M_{w} (USGS) Centred 37km WNW of Linxia Chengguanzhen, China, at a depth of 10.0km.	

== 2024 ==
Date	Time (UTC)	Place	Lat.	Long.	Fatalities	Magnitude	Comments	Source
January 1, 2024	07:10	(Japan) Near the west coast of Honshu, Japan see 2024 Noto earthquake	37.498	137.242	656 dead 2 missing	7.5	M_{w} (USGS) Centred 42km NE of Anamizu, Japan, at a depth of 10.0km.	
January 13, 2024	23:17	Albania	40.983	19.769	1	4.5	M_{wr} (USGS) Centred 7km NE of Lushnjë, Albania, at a depth of 28.6km.	
January 19, 2024	11:26	Colombia	4.719	-75.871	1	5.6	M_{w} (USGS) Centred 5km SE of Cartago, Colombia, at a depth of 60.7km.	
January 22, 2024	18:09	(China) Kyrgyzstan–Xinjiang border region see 2024 Uqturpan earthquake	41.269	78.649	3	7.0	M_{w} (USGS) Centred 129km WNW of Aykol, China, at a depth of 13.0km.	
February 28, 2024	00:48	Java, Indonesia	-6.750	107.680	1	2.9	M_{w} (EMSC) Centred 10km NE of Lembang, Indonesia, at a depth of 10.0km.	
March 4, 2024	18:38	Western Turkey	39.970	27.446	1	4.3	M_{wr} (USGS) Centred 21km NE of Hamdibey, Turkey, at a depth of 15.0km.	
March 23, 2024	20:22	(Papua New Guinea) New Guinea, Papua New Guinea see 2024 East Sepik earthquake	-4.139	143.159	5	6.9	M_{w} (USGS) Centred 38km ENE of Ambunti, Papua New Guinea, at a depth of 40.2km.	
April 2, 2024	23:58	(Taiwan) Taiwan see 2024 Hualien earthquake	23.819	121.562	19 dead 1 missing	7.4	M_{w} (USGS) Centred 18km SSW of Hualien City, Taiwan, at a depth of 34.8km.	
April 27, 2024	16:29	Java, Indonesia	-8.033	107.275	1	6.1	M_{w} (USGS) Centred 94km south of Banjar, Indonesia, at a depth of 61.6km.	
June 18, 2024	09:54	Northeastern Iran	35.192	58.514	4	4.9	M_{b} (USGS) Centred 6km SE of Kāshmar, Iran, at a depth of 10.0km.	
June 28, 2024	05:36	Near the coast of southern Peru	-15.811	-74.445	0	7.2	M_{w} (USGS) Centred 8km west of Atiquipa, Peru, at a depth of 28.0km.	
July 11, 2024	02:13	Moro Gulf, Mindanao, Philippines	6.065	123.161	0	7.1	M_{w} (USGS) Centred 106km WSW of Sangay, Philippines, at a depth of 620.1km.	
July 11, 2024	06:16	Poland	50.136	18.474	1	2.9	M_{L} (USGS) Centred 3km north of Jejkowice, Poland, at a depth of 8.5km. The fatality is an underground miner.	
July 19, 2024	01:50	Chile–Argentina border region	-23.047	-67.782	1	7.4	M_{w} (USGS) Centred 45km ESE of San Pedro de Atacama, Chile, at a depth of 117.4km. The fatality is a Chilean.	
August 8, 2024	07:42	(Japan) Kyushu, Japan see 2024 Hyūga-nada earthquake	31.719	131.527	0	7.1	M_{w} (USGS) Centred 20km NE of Nichinan, Japan, at a depth of 25.0km.	
August 12, 2024	20:56	Syria	35.127	37.015	2	5.0	M_{b} (USGS) Centred 13km NNW of As Salamīyah, Syria, at a depth of 10.0km.	
August 17, 2024	19:10	Off the east coast of the Kamchatka Peninsula, Russia	52.924	160.141	0	7.0	M_{w} (USGS) Centred 102km east of Petropavlovsk–Kamchatsky, Russia, at a depth of 29.0km.	
August 20, 2024	01:15	Southwestern Kashmir	34.146	74.262	1	5.1	M_{b} (USGS) Centred 10km SW of Bāramūla, India, at a depth of 23.0km.	
August 20, 2024	01:22	Southwestern Kashmir	34.145	74.304	1	5.1	M_{b} (USGS) Centred 7km SSW of Bāramūla, India, at a depth of 16.4km.	
September 7, 2024	01:51	Bali region, Indonesia	-8.431	115.313	1	4.8	M_{b} (USGS) Centred 10km NNE of Ubud, Indonesia, at a depth of 35.8km.	
September 18, 2024	02:41	(Indonesia) Java, Indonesia see 2024 West Java earthquake	-7.242	107.566	2	5.0	M_{w} (USGS) Centred 15km ESE of Banjar, Indonesia, at a depth of 10.0km.	
December 5, 2024	18:44	Off the coast of Northern California, United States	40.374	-125.022	0	7.0	M_{w} (USGS) Centred 62.6km west of Petrolia, California, United States, at a depth of 10.0km.	
December 17, 2024	01:47	(Vanuatu) Vanuatu see 2024 Port Vila earthquake	-17.686	168.034	14	7.3	M_{w} (USGS) Centred 30km west of Port-Vila, Vanuatu, at a depth of 57.1km.	

== 2025 ==
Date	Time (UTC)	Place	Lat.	Long.	Fatalities	Magnitude	Comments	Source
January 3, 2025	17:01	(Ethiopia) Ethiopia see 2024–25 Ethiopian earthquakes	9.358	40.346	2	5.5	M_{w} (USGS) Centred 45km NNE of Āwash, Ethiopia, at a depth of 10.0km.	
January 4, 2025	00:52	(Ethiopia) Ethiopia see 2024–25 Ethiopian earthquakes	9.500	40.156	2	5.7	M_{w} (USGS) Centred 56km SSE of Abomsa, Ethiopia, at a depth of 8.0km.	
January 7, 2025	01:05	(China) Western Xizang, China see 2025 Tibet earthquake	28.639	87.361	126~400	7.1	M_{w} (USGS) Centred 93.9km NE of Lobuche, Province 1, Nepal, at a depth of 10.0km.	
January 27, 2025	02:06	Poland	50.056	18.488	1	3.2	M_{L} (USGS) Centred 1km NE of Radlin, Poland, at a depth of 5.0km.	
February 8, 2025	23:23	Cayman Islands region	17.702	-82.456	0	7.6	M_{w} (USGS) Centred 209km SSW of George Town, Cayman Islands, at a depth of 10.0km.	
March 17, 2025	22:23	Northern Sumatra, Indonesia	1.898	99.135	1	5.4	M_{w} (USGS) Centred 43km ENE of Sibolga, Indonesia, at a depth of 50.5km.	
March 28, 2025	06:20	Myanmar see 2025 Myanmar earthquake	22.001	95.925	5,456 dead 538 missing	7.7	M_{w} (USGS) Centred 14.8km NNW of Sagaing, Sagaing, Myanmar, at a depth of 10.0km.	
March 30, 2025	12:18	Tonga	-20.329	-173.907	0	7.0	M_{w} (USGS) Centred 73km SE of Pangai, Tonga, at a depth of 29.0km.	
April 13, 2025	04:24	Kyrgyzstan–Tajikistan border region	39.014	70.663	1	5.8	M_{w} (USGS) Centred 25km east of Rasht, Tajikistan, at a depth of 12.6km.	
April 23, 2025	09:49	(Turkey) Western Turkey see 2025 Istanbul earthquake	40.805	28.148	1	6.2	M_{w} (USGS) Centred 24km SE of Marmara Ereğlisi, Turkey, at a depth of 7.2km.	
May 2, 2025	12:58	Drake Passage	-56.782	-68.209	0	7.4	M_{w} (USGS) Centred 219km south of Ushuaia, Tierra del Fuego, Argentina, at a depth of 10.0km.	
May 17, 2025	15:54	Myanmar	21.400	96.038	2	5.1	M_{w} (USGS) Centred 24km SSW of Kyaukse, Myanmar, at a depth of 10.0km.	
May 22, 2025	19:52	Southern Sumatra, Indonesia	-4.005	102.290	1	5.7	M_{w} (USGS) Centred 22km south of Bengkulu, Indonesia, at a depth of 68.1km.	
June 2, 2025	23:17	Dodecanese Islands, Greece	36.747	28.232	1	5.8	M_{w} (USGS) Centred 5km south of İçmeler, Turkey, at a depth of 74.0km. The fatality was reported in Turkey.	
June 15, 2025	16:35	(Peru) Near the coast of central Peru see 2025 Callao earthquake	-12.147	-77.315	2	5.6	M_{w} (USGS) Centred 23km WSW of Callao, Peru, at a depth of 53.5km.	
July 8, 2025	21:41	Guatemala see 2025 Guatemala earthquakes	14.437	-90.661	7	5.7	M_{w} (USGS) Centred 3km NW of San Vicente Pacaya, Guatemala, at a depth of 10.0km.	
July 10, 2025	03:34	Haryana – Delhi region, India	28.607	76.582	2	4.5	M_{b} (USGS) Centred 7km west of Jhajjar, India, at a depth of 10.0km.	
July 15, 2025	20:57	Myanmar	21.973	96.071	1	4.7	M_{b} (USGS) Centred 1km west of Mandalay, Myanmar, at a depth of 32.0km.	
July 16, 2025	20:37	Alaska Peninsula, United States	54.549	-160.472	0	7.3	M_{w} (USGS) Centred 87.4km south of Sand Point, Alaska, United States, at a depth of 20.1km.	
July 20, 2025	06:49	(Russia) Off the east coast of the Kamchatka Peninsula, Russia see 2025 Kamchatka earthquake	52.909	160.787	0	7.4	M_{w} (USGS) Centred 145km east of Petropavlovsk–Kamchatsky, Kamchatka, Russia, at a depth of 10.0km.	
July 28, 2025	22:10	Macquarie Island region, Australia	-57.605	157.039	0	7.0	M_{w} (USGS) Centred 1437.9km SW of Bluff, Southland, New Zealand, at a depth of 31.0km.	
July 29, 2025	21:25	Guatemala	14.055	-89.883	2	5.7	M_{w} (USGS) Centred 7km SSE of Comapa, Guatemala, at a depth of 10.6km.	
July 29, 2025	23:24	(Russia) Off the east coast of the Kamchatka Peninsula, Russia see 2025 Kamchatka earthquake	52.530	160.165	1	8.8	M_{w} (USGS) Centred 119.1km ESE of Petropavlovsk–Kamchatsky, Kamchatka, Russia, at a depth of 20.7km. The fatality took place in Japan.	
July 31, 2025	21:34	Chile–Argentina border region	-34.031	-70.404	6	5.0	M_{b} (USGS) Centred 28km NE of Machalí, Chile, at a depth of 10.0km.	
August 10, 2025	16:53	(Turkey) Western Turkey see 2025 Balıkesir earthquake	39.312	28.069	2	6.1	M_{w} (USGS) Centred 10km SSW of Bigadiç, Turkey, at a depth of 10.0km.	
August 11, 2025	19:26	Poland	50.178	18.615	1	2.1	M_{L} (USGS) Centred 1km SE of Wilcza, Poland, at a depth of 5.0km.	
August 16, 2025	22:38	(Indonesia) Sulawesi, Indonesia see 2025 Sulawesi earthquake	-1.282	120.727	2	5.8	M_{w} (USGS) Centred 12km NNW of Poso, Indonesia, at a depth of 8.0km.	
August 22, 2025	02:16	Drake Passage	-60.186	-61.821	0	7.5	M_{w} (USGS) Centred 706.9km SSE of Tolhuin, Tierra del Fuego, Argentina, at a depth of 10.8km.	
August 31, 2025	19:17	(Afghanistan) Hindu Kush region, Afghanistan see 2025 Kunar earthquake	34.706	70.793	2,217	6.0	M_{w} (USGS) Centred 37km WSW of Asadābād, Afghanistan, at a depth of 8.0km.	
September 4, 2025	16:56	(Afghanistan) Hindu Kush region, Afghanistan see 2025 Kunar earthquake	34.719	70.791	2	5.6	M_{w} (USGS) Centred 36km WSW of Asadābād, Afghanistan, at a depth of 10.0km.	
September 13, 2025	02:37	(Russia) Near the east coast of the Kamchatka Peninsula, Russia see 2025 Kamchatka earthquake	53.104	160.294	0	7.4	M_{w} (USGS) Centred 111km east of Petropavlovsk–Kamchatsky, Russia, at a depth of 39.5km.	
September 14, 2025	07:12	Northern Colombia	6.949	-76.173	1	5.4	M_{w} (USGS) Centred 5km north of Uramita, Colombia, at a depth of 50.2km.	
September 18, 2025	18:58	(Russia) Near the east coast of the Kamchatka Peninsula, Russia see 2025 Kamchatka earthquake	53.193	160.513	0	7.8	M_{w} (USGS) Centred 127km east of Petropavlovsk–Kamchatsky, Russia, at a depth of 19.5km.	
September 24, 2025	22:21	(Venezuela) Trujillo, Venezuela see 2025 Zulia earthquakes	9.922	-70.717	1	6.2	M_{w} (USGS) Centred 24km ENE of Mene Grande, Venezuela, at a depth of 7.8km.	
September 25, 2025	03:51	(Venezuela) Trujillo, Venezuela see 2025 Zulia earthquakes	9.927	-70.692	1	6.3	M_{w} (USGS) Centred 27km ENE of Mene Grande, Venezuela, at a depth of 14.0km.	
September 30, 2025	13:59	(Philippines) Leyte, Philippines see 2025 Cebu earthquake	11.136	124.127	79	6.9	M_{w} (USGS) Centred 10km east of Bateria, Philippines, at a depth of 10.0km.	
October 10, 2025	01:43	(Philippines) Mindanao, Philippines see 2025 Davao Oriental earthquakes	7.265	126.755	10	7.4	M_{w} (USGS) Centred 20km east of Santiago, Philippines, at a depth of 58.1km.	
October 10, 2025	20:29	Drake Passage	-60.196	-61.799	0	7.6	M_{w} (USGS) Centred 708.4 km SSE of Tolhuin, Tierra del Fuego, Argentina, at a depth of 8.8km.	
October 11, 2025	16:18	Ethiopia	13.790	39.866	1	5.6	M_{w} (USGS) Centred 53km NE of Mek'ele, Ethiopia, at a depth of 10.0km.	
November 2, 2025	20:29	(Afghanistan) Central Afghanistan see 2025 Balkh earthquake	36.550	67.374	31	6.2	M_{w} (USGS) Centred 29km SE of Mazār-e Sharīf, Afghanistan, at a depth of 28.0km.	
November 21, 2025	04:38	Bangladesh see 2025 Bangladesh earthquake	23.808	90.649	10	5.4	M_{w} (USGS) Centred 14km SSW of Narsingdi, Bangladesh, at a depth of 27.0km.	
December 6, 2025	20:41	Southern Yukon Territory, Canada	60.359	-139.546	0	7.0	M_{w} (USGS) Centred 90.7km north of Yakutat, Alaska, United States, at a depth of 10.0km.	
December 8, 2025	14:15	Hokkaido, Japan region see 2025 Aomori earthquake	41.043	142.141	0	7.6	M_{w} (USGS) Centred 74.5km ENE of Misawa, Aomori, Japan, at a depth of 44.1km.	
December 27, 2025	15:05	Taiwan region	24.657	122.041	1	6.6	M_{w} (USGS) Centred 31km ESE of Yilan, Taiwan, at a depth of 67.5km.	

== 2026 ==
Date	Time (UTC)	Place	Lat.	Long.	Fatalities	Magnitude	Comments	Source
January 2, 2026	13:58	(Mexico) Near the coast of Guerrero, Mexico see 2026 Guerrero earthquake	16.902	-99.303	2	6.5	M_{w} (USGS) Centred 4km NNW of Rancho Viejo, Mexico, at a depth of 35.0km.	
January 19, 2026	06:21	Northwestern Kashmir see 2026 Gilgit–Baltistan earthquake	36.706	74.449	2	5.6	M_{w} (USGS) Centred 47km NNW of Barishal, Pakistan, at a depth of 35.0km.	
February 5, 2026	18:06	(Indonesia) Java, Indonesia see 2026 Pacitan earthquake	-8.787	111.226	1	5.8	M_{w} (USGS) Centred 94km SW of Trenggalek, Indonesia, at a depth of 40.0km.	
February 22, 2026	16:57	Sabah, Malaysia	6.854	116.294	0	7.1	M_{w} (USGS) Centred 57km NNW of Kota Belud, Malaysia, at a depth of 629.0km.	
March 24, 2026	04:37	Tonga	-18.668	-175.560	0	7.5	M_{w} (USGS) Centred 166km west of Neiafu, Tonga, at a depth of 229.5km.	
March 30, 2026	08:44	Vanuatu	-15.314	167.562	0	7.3	M_{w} (USGS) Centred 48km ENE of Luganville, Vanuatu, at a depth of 121.3km.	
April 1, 2026	22:48	Molucca Sea see 2026 North Maluku earthquake	1.117	126.297	1	7.4	M_{w} (USGS) Centred 126km WNW of Ternate, Indonesia, at a depth of 35.0km.	
April 3, 2026	16:12	(Afghanistan) Hindu Kush region, Afghanistan see 2026 Jorm earthquake	36.548	70.852	12	5.8	M_{w} (USGS) Centred 35km south of Jurm, Afghanistan, at a depth of 186.4km.	
April 20, 2026	07:52	(Japan) Near the east coast of Honshu, Japan see 2026 Sanriku earthquake	39.994	142.995	0	7.4	M_{w} (USGS) Centred 98km ENE of Miyako, Japan, at a depth of 25.0km.	
May 17, 2026	16:21	(China) Guangxi, China see 2026 Liuzhou earthquakes	24.419	109.249	2	5.0	M_{w} (USGS) Centred 19km WNW of Liuzhou, China, at a depth of 10.0km.	
May 18, 2026	13:44	(China) Guangxi, China see 2026 Liuzhou earthquakes	24.499	109.267	2	5.1	M_{w} (USGS) Centred 24km NW of Liuzhou, China, at a depth of 10.0km.	
May 26, 2026	14:05	Pakistan	32.645	73.295	1	4.6	M_{b} (USGS) Centred 12km NE of Malakwal City, Pakistan, at a depth of 33.0km.	
June 7, 2026	23:37	(Philippines) Mindanao, Philippines see 2026 Mindanao earthquake	5.592	125.047	107 dead 7 missing	7.8	M_{w} (USGS) Centred 26km SW of Kablalan, Philippines, at a depth of 55.2km.	
June 16, 2026	03:27	(Indonesia) Sulawesi, Indonesia see 2026 Central Sulawesi earthquake	-1.117	120.199	3	6.7	M_{w} (USGS) Centred 43km ESE of Palu, Indonesia, at a depth of 10.0km.	
June 16, 2026	09:06	Northern Qinghai, China	37.889	95.403	1	6.3	M_{w} (USGS) Centred 260km SSE of Dunhuang, China, at a depth of 10.0km.	
June 17, 2026	13:29	Poland	50.272	18.762	1	2.3	M_{L} (USGS) Centred 2km NNE of Przyszowice, Poland, at a depth of 5.0km.	
June 24, 2026	22:04	Near the coast of Venezuela see 2026 Venezuela earthquakes	10.436	-68.528	6,509 dead ??,??? missing	7.2	M_{w} (USGS) Centred 23km SE of Yumare, Venezuela, at a depth of 20.3km.	
June 24, 2026	22:05	Near the coast of Venezuela see 2026 Venezuela earthquakes	10.435	-68.472	6,509 dead ??,??? missing	7.5	M_{w} (USGS) Centred 28km SE of Yumare, Venezuela, at a depth of 10.0km.	
July 12, 2026	13:46	Minahasa, Sulawesi, Indonesia	1.137	121.421	2	5.4	M_{b} (USGS) Centred 194km WNW of Gorontalo, Indonesia, at a depth of 35.0km.	
July 17, 2026	14:48	Near the coast of Chiapas, Mexico	14.604	-92.952	0	7.3	M_{w} (USGS) Centred 58km WSW of Puerto Madero, Mexico, at a depth of 18.6km.	
July 19, 2026	02:24	(Peru) Central Peru see 2026 Huancayo earthquake	-12.043	-75.301	6	5.5	M_{w} (USGS) Centred 2km WSW of Sicaya, Peru, at a depth of 10.0km.	
July 28, 2026	07:27	(Japan) Kyushu, Japan see 2026 Kumamoto earthquake	32.682	130.722	38	6.8	M_{w} (USGS) Centred 5.2km east of Uto, Kumamoto, Japan, at a depth of 10.0km.	
August 3, 2026	00:00	Egypt	30.292	32.627	1	5.0	M_{w} (USGS) Centred 36km NNE of Suez, Egypt, at a depth of 10.0km.	
August 7, 2026	05:08	Eastern Sichuan, China	28.505	104.752	1	5.1	M_{b} (USGS) Centred 6km NNE of Xunchang, China, at a depth of 10.0km.	
August 7, 2026	23:11	(Peru) Central Peru see 2026 Huancayo earthquake	-12.124	-75.524	1	4.7	M_{b} (USGS) Centred 17km WNW of Yanacancha, Peru, at a depth of 10.0km.	
August 10, 2026	12:34	Colombia see 2026 Colombia earthquake	4.860	-76.256	335 dead 111 missing	7.4	M_{w} (USGS) Centred 4km SSW of San José del Palmar, Colombia, at a depth of 116.1km.	
August 14, 2026	21:58	(Indonesia) Flores region, Indonesia see 2026 Flores earthquake	-8.336	121.345	136	7.8	M_{w} (USGS) Centred 66km NNW of Ende, Indonesia, at a depth of 10.0km.	
August 15, 2026	16:25	Minahasa, Sulawesi, Indonesia	0.172	120.268	1	5.8	M_{w} (USGS) Centred 127km NNE of Palu, Indonesia, at a depth of 65.0km.	
August 17, 2026	00:46	(Indonesia) Flores region, Indonesia see 2026 Flores earthquake	-8.265	121.464	2	5.5	M_{w} (USGS) Centred 67km NNW of Ende, Indonesia, at a depth of 5.2km.	
August 19, 2026	22:45	(Indonesia) Flores region, Indonesia see 2026 Flores earthquake	-8.342	120.544	1	5.7	M_{w} (USGS) Centred 31km NNE of Ruteng, Indonesia, at a depth of 10.0km.	
October 3, 2026	22:55	Sumbawa region, Indonesia	-9.567	118.908	1	5.9	M_{w} (USGS) Centred 39km WSW of Tambolaka, Indonesia, at a depth of 46.0km.	
October 6, 2026	16:53	Uttaranchal, India	30.042	79.547	5	5.1	M_{b} (USGS) Centred 31km NW of Bāgeshwar, India, at a depth of 16.5km.	
October 9, 2026	17:56	Panama see 2026 Panama earthquake	7.587	-80.769	2	7.7	M_{w} (USGS) Centred 12km WSW of Pitaloza Arriba, Panama, at a depth of 12.6km.	
October 17, 2026	05:06	Pakistan	28.018	66.171	1	5.7	M_{w} (USGS) Centred 48km WNW of Khuzdar, Pakistan, at a depth of 10.0km.	
October 22, 2026	14:33	(China) Xizang–Qinghai border region, China see 2026 Tibet earthquake	32.380	93.780	16	7.0	M_{w} (USGS) Centred 191km ENE of Nagqu, China, at a depth of 18.0km.	

All times are UTC, unless otherwise stated
ML = Richter magnitude scale
Mw = Moment magnitude
M_{b} = Body wave magnitude
HRV = Harvard University (Global CMT)
USGS = United States Geological Survey

== See also ==
- List of earthquakes 2001–2010
- List of earthquakes 2011–2020
