= 1784 Peru earthquake =

Megathrust earthquake in Peru

- Location within Peru
- Local date: 13 May 1784
- Local time: 07:35
- Magnitude: M_{w} 8.4
- Epicenter: 16.5°S 72.0°W
- Areas affected: Colonial Peru
- Max. intensity: MMI X (Extreme)
- Tsunami: Yes
- Casualties: 400

The 1784 Peru earthquake occurred at 07:35 local time on 13 May with a moment magnitude of 8.4 and maximum Mercalli intensity of X (Extreme). It affected southern Peru and generated a tsunami of 2–4 m (6 ft 7 in – 13 ft 1 in); the region was previously affected by magnitude 8.0 or greater earthquakes in 1604 and 1687.

== Tectonic setting ==
Off the coasts of Peru and Chile, the Nazca plate subducts underneath the South American plate along the Peru-Chile Trench. At the location of the earthquake, the convergence rate between the two plates is 6.0 cm (2 in) per year. Large earthquakes at the plate boundary are relatively common, with similar large events occurring in 1687, 1784, 1868, and 2001. In the area of the earthquake, the Nazca Ridge functions as a semi-persistent rupture barrier. This inhibits the ability for most earthquakes to continue rupturing through this area. As a result, this earthquake cycle is considered to be bimodal, which means that the recurring earthquake is either a large (up to M_{w} 8.5) or a truly giant (M_{w} 9.0) earthquake. Only the 1604 and 1868 events are considered to have been the latter truly colossal events.

== Earthquake ==
The earthquake ruptured about 300 km (190 mi) of the subduction zone in southern Peru with an estimated moment magnitude of 8.4. The earthquake was smaller in magnitude with the events of 1604 and 1868. The seismic intensity distribution was similar to that of a M_{w} 8.4 earthquake in the same area on 23 June 2001, suggesting both earthquakes ruptured the same segment of the subduction zone with comparable rupture areas.

== Impact ==
Damage occurred from Caravelí to Arica; destruction also occurred in Sihuas, Vitor, Huchumayo, and Camaná. In Arequipa, the earthquake killed at least 54 people and injured 500, while the total number of deaths did not exceed 500. Many buildings and homes sustained heavy damage; of the 2,069 homes in the city, only 72 resisted the shaking. Within 100 km (62 mi) of the city, many towns also experienced destruction. It was preceded by foreshocks at 02:00 and 05:00, and many aftershocks followed. The mainshock produced 4.5 to 5 minutes of shaking that occurred in a south to north direction, and three shocks were felt. The first phase, lasting 2 minutes, was a strong swaying motion; many people managed to escape from their buildings during this phase. The next phase, described as a swirling motion, lasted 1 minute, causing buildings to collapse and stones dislodged form the middle of walls. The final shock destroyed what buildings remained after the second phase.

== See also ==
- List of earthquakes in Peru
- List of historical earthquakes
