= 1604 Arica earthquake =

Southern Peru Earthquake and Pacific Ocean Tsunami

- UTC time: 1604-11-24 18:30:00
- ISC event
- USGS-ANSS
- Local date: November 24, 1604
- Local time: 13:30
- Magnitude: M_{w} 8.7–9.0 (Note: M_{w} 8.7–9.0 M_{s} 8.0–8.5 M_{t} 8.8–9.0 M_{uk} 9.0)
- Depth: 30 km (19 mi)
- Epicenter: 18.5°S 70.4°W
- Fault: Peru-Chile Trench
- Type: Megathrust
- Areas affected: Arica (now part of Chile), Arequipa, Peru
- Max. intensity: MMI XI (Extreme)
- Tsunami: Yes
- Casualties: 100+

The 1604 Arica earthquake is an earthquake that occurred at 1:30 pm on November 24, 1604, offshore Arica, Chile (formerly part of the Spanish Empire). The estimated magnitude range is M_{s} 8.0–8.5 and up to M_{w} 8.7–9.0 and M_{t} 8.8–9.0. It had a destructive tsunami and destroyed most of Southern Peru, including Arica and Arequipa. 1,200–2,800 km (750–1,740 mi) of coastline was affected by the tsunami. The recorded effects of this earthquake are very similar to those for the 1868 Arica event, suggesting a similar magnitude and rupture area of the megathrust between the subducting Nazca plate and the overriding South American plate. Tsunami deposits have been identified on the Chatham Islands that are likely to have been caused by a trans-Pacific tsunami caused by the 1604 earthquake.

== Tectonic setting ==
Off the coasts of Peru and Chile, the Nazca plate subducts underneath the South American plate along the Peru-Chile Trench. At the location of the earthquake, the convergence rate between the two plates is 6.0 cm (2 in)/year. Large events at the plate boundary are relatively common, with similar large earthquakes occurring in 1687, 1784, 1868, and 2001. In the area of the earthquake, the Nazca Ridge functions as a semi-persistent rupture barrier. This inhibits the ability for most earthquakes to continue rupturing through this area. As a result, this earthquake cycle is considered to be bimodal, which means that the release of stress in the fault is in both major m8.5+ events, or in smaller m8.0 events along the fault over time. Only the 1604 and 1868 events are considered to have been above a magnitude of 9.

== Earthquake ==
Little is known about the earthquake, but it is interpreted to be similar in size and faulting to the 1868 Arica earthquake. The cities of Arequipa, Tacna, and Moquegua experienced shaking of Modified Mercalli Intensity VIII, while Cuzco and Ica experienced VI shaking. Shaking was strongly felt in Lima. The rupture length is thought to be between 400–450 km (249–280 mi) long. It is believed that the 1604 event was unable to rupture north of the Nazca Ridge, which means that only the absolute largest earthquakes (such as 1868) can pass through this semi-persistent rupture barrier.

== Tsunami ==
The tsunami was widespread and impacted many countries. The tsunami, along with the 1868 event, is considered one of "the greatest historical tsunami events along the Perú-Chile Trench" and "among the greatest tsunamis ever observed in the Pacific ocean". Tsunami run-ups height were estimated to be around 16 m (52 ft) high. It was recorded along at least 1,200 km (746 mi) and potentially up to 2,800 km (1,740 mi) of coastline in South America between Lima and Concepción. Weak waves arrived in Northern Peru. At Arica, the tsunami inundated up to 10 km (6.2 mi) inland. In Oceania, the Chatham Islands have recorded what is very likely evidence of tsunami from this event as well.

== Damage ==
Arica was destroyed and rebuilt after the earthquake, while Arequipa was so severely damaged that only the San Francisco monastery remained standing. Camaná, Moquegua, and Tacna suffered major devastation. In Pausa, a majority of houses were destroyed. In Pisco, only certain parts of the town experienced major damage. The city of Ica was slightly damaged despite being far from the rupture area. Landslides reportedly occurred between the latitudes of 15.5 and 18.5S. Other ground deformations such as cracks and liquefactions occurred as well. Damage was reported across the Pacific Ocean. Overall, damages from the earthquake were comparable to the 1868 earthquake.

== See also ==
- 1868 Arica earthquake
- List of earthquakes in Peru

== Bibliography ==
- Comte, Diana; Pardo, M. (1 March 1991). "Reappraisal of great historical earthquakes in the Northern Chile and Southern Peru seismic gaps". Natural Hazards. 4 (1): 23–44. Bibcode:1991NatHa...4...23C. doi:10.1007/BF00126557. S2CID 140190546.
- Dorbath, L.; Cisternas, A.; Dorbath, C. (1 June 1990). "Assessment of the size of large and great historical earthquakes in Peru". Bulletin of the Seismological Society of America. 80 (3): 551–576.
- Giovanni, Melissa K.; Beck, Susan L.; Wagner, Lara (6 November 2002). "The June 23, 2001 Peru earthquake and the southern Peru subduction zone". Geophysical Research Letters. 29 (21): 14-1 – 14-4. Bibcode:2002GeoRL..29.2018G. doi:10.1029/2002GL015774.
- Goff, J.; Nichol, S.; Chagué-Goff, C.; Horrocks, M.; McFadgen, B.; Cisternas, M. (2010). "Predecessor to New Zealand's largest historic trans-South Pacific tsunami of 1868 AD". Marine Geology. 275 (1–4): 155–165. Bibcode:2010MGeol.275..155G. doi:10.1016/j.margeo.2010.05.006.
- Kulikov, Evgueni A.; Rabinovich, Alexander B.; Thomson, Richard E. (June 2005). "Estimation of Tsunami Risk for the Coasts of Peru and Northern Chile". Natural Hazards. 35 (2): 185–209. Bibcode:2005NatHa..35..185K. doi:10.1007/s11069-004-4809-3. S2CID 140620121.
- Lomnitz, C. (2004). "Major Earthquakes of Chile: A Historical Survey, 1535–1960". Seismological Research Letters. 75 (3): 368–378. Bibcode:2004SeiRL..75..368L. doi:10.1785/gssrl.75.3.368.
- Loveless, J. P.; Pritchard, M. E.; Kukowski, N. (22 November 2010). "Testing mechanisms of subduction zone segmentation and seismogenesis with slip distributions from recent Andean earthquakes". Tectonophysics. 495 (1–2): 15–33. Bibcode:2010Tectp.495...15L. doi:10.1016/j.tecto.2009.05.008. ISSN 0040-1951.
- Okal, E.A.; Borrero, J.C.; Synolakis, C.E. (2006). "Evaluation of Tsunami Risk from Regional Earthquakes at Pisco, Peru". Bulletin of the Seismological Society of America. 96 (5): 1634–1648. Bibcode:2006BuSSA..96.1634O. doi:10.1785/0120050158.
- Spiske, Michaela; Piepenbreier, Jens; Benavente, Carlos; Kunz, Alexander; Bahlburg, Heinrich; Steffahn, Jens (14 August 2013). "Historical tsunami deposits in Peru: Sedimentology, inverse modeling and optically stimulated luminescence dating". Quaternary International. 305: 31–44. Bibcode:2013QuInt.305...31S. doi:10.1016/j.quaint.2013.02.010. ISSN 1040-6182.
- Villegas-Lanza, J. C.; Chlieh, M.; Cavalié, O.; Tavera, H.; Baby, P.; Chire-Chira, J.; Nocquet, J.-M. (24 September 2016). "Active tectonics of Peru: Heterogeneous interseismic coupling along the Nazca megathrust, rigid motion of the Peruvian Sliver, and Subandean shortening accommodation". J. Geophys. Res. Solid Earth. 121 (10): 7371–7394. Bibcode:2016JGRB..121.7371V. doi:10.1002/2016JB013080. hdl:20.500.12816/2358. S2CID 132735222.
- Wong, Ivan; Dober, Mark; Pezzopane, Silvio; Thomas, Patricia; Terra, Fabia (1 January 2012). Seismic hazard above the South America subduction zone in Southern Peru (PDF). 15th World Conference on Earthquake Engineering, Lisbon, Portugal.
