= 2021 Mala earthquake =

6.0 magnitude earthquake in Mala, Lima, Peru

Coordinates: 12.684°S 76.735°W

- The Jorge Chávez airport damaged by the earthquake

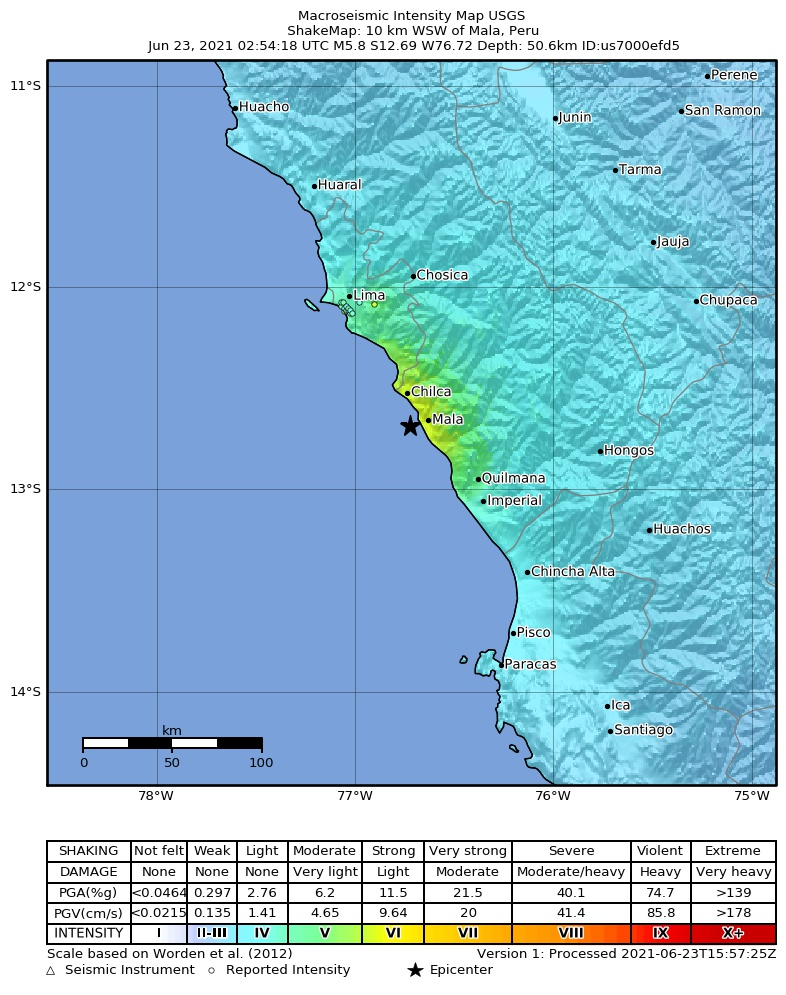
- Shakemap of the earthquake
- UTC time: 2021-06-23 02:54:18
- ISC event: 620541246
- USGS-ANSS: ComCat
- Local date: June 22, 2021
- Local time: 21:54:18
- Duration: 95 seconds
- Magnitude: 5.9 M_{w} 6.0 M_{L}
- Depth: 50.6 km 32 km 45 km
- Areas affected: Lima Metropolitana and Cañete Province
- Max. intensity: MMI VI (Strong)
- Casualties: 1 dead, 20 injured

The 2021 Mala earthquake, with a Richter magnitude of 6.0 and moment magnitude of 5.9, struck on June 22, 2021, at 21:54:18 local time (UTC−5) with an epicenter off the coast of Mala in the department of Lima. Following the main event, there were more than 15 aftershocks, with the largest being a magnitude 4.8 event at 07:03 local time on June 23.

Centro Sismológico Nacional
(@Sismos_Peru_IGP)
tweeted:

Spanish:

IGP/CENSIS/RS 2021-0363

Fecha y Hora Local: 22 June 2021 21:54:18
Magnitud: 6.0
Profundidad: 32 km
Latitud: -12.77
Longitud: -76.91
Intensidad: V-VI Mala

Referencia: 33 km al SO de Mala, Cañete – Lima

Translation:

IGP/CENSIS/RS 2021-0363
Local date: June 22, 2021, 21:54:18
Magnitude: 6.0
Depth: 32 km
Latitude: -12.77
Longitude: -76.91
Intensity: V-VI in Mala
Reference: 33 km at southwest Mala, Cañete Province – Lima

June 22, 2021

Initially, the earthquake was 5.8 magnitude (M_{L}), it was revised by the Instituto Geofísico del Perú (IGP) to 6.0 M_{L}. It was felt strongly in Lima. The earthquake affected the Lima metropolitan area and the Cañete Province, killing a six-year-old boy due to a cardiorespiratory arrest, confirmed 1 day after the earthquake.

== Tectonic setting ==
Peru lies above the destructive boundary where the Nazca plate is being subducted beneath the South American plate along the line of the Peru–Chile Trench. The two plates are converging towards each other at a rate of about 78mm or 3 inches per year.

== Damage ==
Some streets in Lima and Cañete Province were closed due to landslides in the houses, including the Costa Verde which closed due to one. Due to the earthquake, the Instituto Geofísico del Perú programmed an earthquake drill for June 29, 2021, at 10:00 a.m. (UTC−05:00).

In the Jorge Chávez International Airport and a Plaza Vea supermarket reported some damage to ceilings and items falling off shelves. In the Costa Verde, rockslides were reported.

== See also ==
- 2014 Peru earthquake
- List of earthquakes in 2021
- List of earthquakes in Peru
- 2022 Chilca earthquake – a M_{w} 5.4 earthquake that also impacted the Lima area.
