= List of earthquakes in Peru =

Map of earthquakes in Peru 1900– (map data)

Earthquakes in Peru are common occurrences as the country is located in a seismic zone. The interface between the Nazca and South American tectonic plates is located near the Peruvian coast. The South American plate is moving over the Nazca plate at a rate of 77 mm (3.0 in) per year.

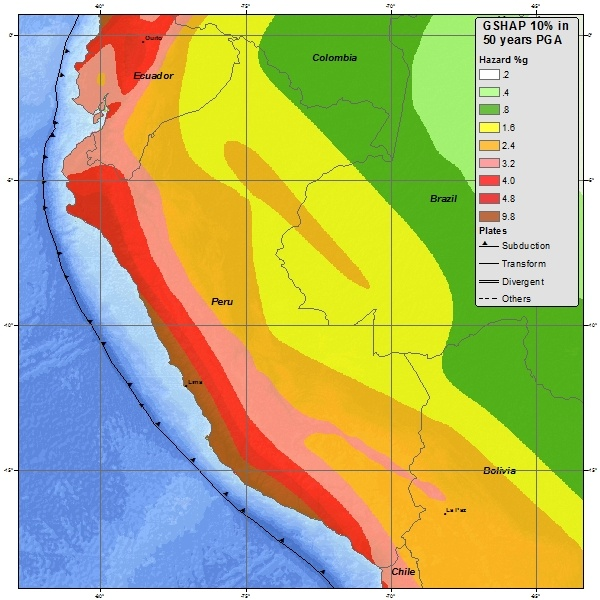
Seismic hazard map in Peru

This earthquakes occur as thrust faulting on the interface between the two plates, with the South American plate moving towards the sea over the Nazca plate. The same process has caused the rise of the Andes mountain range and the creation of the Peru–Chile Trench, as well as volcanism in the Peruvian highlands.

== Geology of Peru ==
The oldest rocks in Peru date to the Precambrian and are more than two billion years old. Along the southern coast, granulite and charnockite shows reworking by an ancient orogeny mountain-building event. Situated close to the Peru-Chile Trench, these rocks have anomalously high strontium isotope ratios, which suggest recent calc-alkaline volcanism.

In the Eastern Cordillera of Peru, Precambrian magmatism in the Huanaco region produced ultramafic, mafic and felsic rocks, including serpentinite, meta-diorite, meta-gabbro, meta-tonalite and diorite and granite that intruded after the first phase of orogenic tectonic activity.

The Grenville orogeny had a major impact in Peru. The basement of the Central Andean orogeny includes the rocks of the Arequipa Massif, which reach granulite grade on the sequence of metamorphic facies and formed around 1.9 billion years ago. Zircon grains in these rocks match those in Labrador, Greenland and Scotland, indicating that much of western South America originated as a promontory of the proto-North American continent Laurentia.

== Earthquakes ==
Notable earthquakes in Peruvian history include the following:

Date	Location	Mag.	MMI	Deaths	Injuries	Notes	Citations
2026-07-19	Junín	5.5 M_{w}	VII	6	200	Severe damage	
2025-12-27	Chimbote	6.2 M_{w}	VI		53	Moderate damage	
2025-06-15	Callao	5.6 M_{w}	VI	2	135	Severe damage	
2024-06-28	Arequipa	7.2 M_{w}	VIII		20	Moderate damage	
2023-03-18	Tumbes	6.8 M_{w}	VII	2	Several	Severe damage in Tumbes	
2022-07-13	Moquegua	5.5 M_{w}	VII		6	Moderate damage	
2022-05-27	Ica	5.5 M_{w}	IV		8	Minor damage	
2022-05-26	Puno	7.2 M_{w}	VII		87	Moderate damage	
2022-05-12	Lima	5.5 M_{w}	VII	2	11	Moderate damage	
2022-03-16	Arequipa	5.5 M_{w}	VII		6	Severe damage	
2022-02-03	Loreto	6.5 M_{w}	VI			Minor damage/Intermediate depth	
2021-11-28	Loreto	7.5 M_{w}	VIII	12	136	Severe damage/Intermediate depth	
2021-07-30	Piura	6.2 M_{w}	VII		721	Severe damage	
2021-06-22	Lima	5.9 M_{w}	VI	1	20	Moderate damage	
2020-06-07	Ancash	4.5 M_{w}	IV	1			
2019-05-26	Loreto	8.0 M_{w}	VIII	2	30	Intermediate depth	
2019-03-01	Puno	7.0 M_{w}	VII	1	2		
2018-08-24	Madre de Dios	7.1 M_{w}	III			Great depth	
2018-01-14	Arequipa	7.1 M_{w}	VII	2	139		
2016-12-01	Puno	6.2 M_{w}	VII	1	17	40 houses damaged in Lampa Province	
2016-08-15	Arequipa	5.5 M_{w}		9	68	605 homes destroyed	
2015-11-25	Ucayali	7.6 M_{w}	V				
2015-11-25	Madre de Dios	7.6 M_{w}	IV				
2014-09-27	Cusco	5.0 M_{w}	VII	8		60 homes damaged	
2013-09-25	Arequipa	7.1 M_{w}	VIII			190 homes damaged	
2012-01-30	Ica	6.4 M_{w}	VI		119	Buildings damaged	
2011-10-28	Huancavelica	6.9 M_{w}	VII	1			
2011-08-24	Ucayali	7.0 M_{w}	VI	1	20	Buildings damaged	
2007-08-15	Ica	8.0 M_{w}	IX	595	2,291	Extreme damage	
2005-09-26	San Martín	7.5 M_{w}	VI	20	266	Buildings damaged	
2001-07-07	Arequipa	7.6 M_{w}	VII	3		Aftershock	
2001-06-23	Arequipa	8.4 M_{w}	IX	74–145	2,713	Tsunami 7 m (23 ft)	
1996-11-12	Ica	7.7 M_{w}	VIII	24		Severe damage	
1996-02-21	Nazca	7.4 M_{w}	V	12		Moderate damage	
1993-04-18	Lima	6.3 M_{w}		10			
1991-04-04	Loreto	6.5 M_{w}	IX	100		Severe damage	
1990-05-29	Amazonas	6.8 M_{w}	VIII	300		Great damage in Moyobamba	
1986-04-06	Cuzco	6.1 M_{w}	VII	27			
1986-01-11	Ancash	5.1 M_{w}	IV	1		Moderate damage/landslides	
1979-02-16	Arequipa	6.8 M_{w}	VIII	100		Severe damage	
1974-10-03	Lima	8.1 M_{w}	IX	78	2,400		
1970-12-10	Tumbes	7.6 M_{s}	X	82	350	Moderate damage	
1970-05-31	Ancash	7.9 M_{w}	VIII	66,794–70,000	50,000	Extreme damage, Major landslide	
1970-02-14	Huanuco	6.1 M_{w}		14			
1969-10-01	Junin	6.9 M_{w}		635		Severe damage	
1966-10-17	Lima	8.1 M_{w}	IX	100			
1963-08-15	Puno	7.7 M_{uk}			1	Great depth	
1960-11-20	Lambayeque	7.8 M_{w}	VIII	13		Tsunami 9 m (30 ft)	
1960-01-15	Ica	7.1 M_{w}	VII		1	Minor damage	
1960-01-13	Arequipa	7.8 M_{s}	X	63	200	Moderate damage	
1958-01-15	Arequipa	7.0 M_{w}		69			
1953-12-12	Tumbes	7.5 M_{w}	VIII	7	20		
1950-05-21	Cuzco	7.0 M_{w}		1,625		Severe damage	
1947-11-01	Junin	7.6 M_{w}		1,242			
1946-11-10	Ancash	7.3 M_{w}	IX	1,400			
1943-01-30	Cuzco	6.5 M_{w}		252			
1942-08-24	Ica	8.2 M_{w}	IX	30		Tsunami 1.6 m	
1940-05-24	Lima	8.2 M_{w}		562		Severe damage in Lima	
1937-12-24	Pasco	6.8 M_{w}		194			
1928-05-14	Chachapoyas	7.2 M_{w}	X	1,928			
1922-10-11	Arequipa	7.2 M_{w}				Intermediate depth	
1922-01-17	Loreto	7.9 M_{w}	IV			Shallow Earthquake	
1921-12-18	Loreto	7.3 M_{w}	III			Shallow Earthquake	
1917-05-21	Arequipa	6.1 M_{w}		32			
1914-12-04	Ayacucho	6.7 M_{w}		400			
1914-02-26	Arequipa	7.2 Mb				Shallow Earthquake	
1913-11-04	Apurímac	6.5 M_{w}		253			
1913-08-06	Arequipa	7.9 M_{s}	X	2	3	Great Damage	
1906-12-26	Tacna	7.9 M_{s}				Shallow Earthquake	
1906-09-28	Loreto	7.5 Mb	VI			Shallow Earthquake	
1877-05-09	Tarapacá	8.8 M_{w}	XI	2,385		Major Tsunami	
1869-08-24	Arequipa	8.4 M_{s}					
1868-08-13	Arica	9.0 M_{w}	XI	25,000		Extreme damage, Major tsunami 16 m (52 ft)	
1828-03-30	Lima	8.3 M_{s}		162			
1821-07-10	Arequipa	8.2 M_{s}	VII				
1784-03-13	Arequipa	8.4 M_{w}	X	400		Tsunami 2–4 m (6 ft 7 in – 13 ft 1 in)	
1746-10-28	Lima, Callao	9.0 M_{w}	XI	5,941		Tsunami 24 m (79 ft)	
1725-01-06	La Libertad	7.6 M_{w}		5,000			
1716-02-11	Ica	8.6 M_{uk}	X				
1716-02-06	Arequipa	8.8 M_{uk}	IX				
1678-06-18	Lima	8.4 M_{s}	IX	3			
1687-10-20	Ica	8.7 M_{w}	X	5,000		Major tsunami	
1655-11-13	Lima	8.8 M_{s}	IX				
1650-05-12	Cuzco	7.7 M_{w}		460			
1650-03-31	Arica	7.0 M_{s}		5,000			
1650-03-31	Cuzco	8.1 M_{uk}	X				
1630-11-27	Lima	8.1 M_{uk}	VII			Moderate damage	
1619-02-14	La Libertad	8.6 M_{s}		350			
1615-09-16	Arica	8.8 M_{s}				Small tsunami	
1609-10-20	Lima	8.6 M_{uk}	VIII				
1604-11-24	Arica	8.5 M_{w}		1,200			
1600-02-28	Arequipa	8.1 M_{uk}	X				
1600-02-19	Arequipa	7.9 M_{uk}	XI	1,500			
1590	Arequipa	7.7 M_{s}	VII				
1586-07-09	Lima	8.6 M_{w}		22			
1584-03-17	Lima	8.4 M_{s}	VII				
1582-08-15	Arequipa	7.8 M_{uk}	VII				
1582-01-22	Arequipa	8.2 M_{s}	X				
1555-11-15	Lima	8.4 M_{uk}	VII			Major tsunami	
1513-01-01	Arequipa	8.7 M_{uk}	VIII				
1471	Arequipa	8.0 M_{uk}	IX				
The inclusion criteria for adding events are based on WikiProject Earthquakes' notability guideline that was developed for stand alone articles. The principles described are also applicable to lists. In summary, only damaging, injurious, or deadly events should be recorded.

== See also ==
- Geography of Peru
