= 2025 Callao earthquake =

Earthquake in Lima, Peru

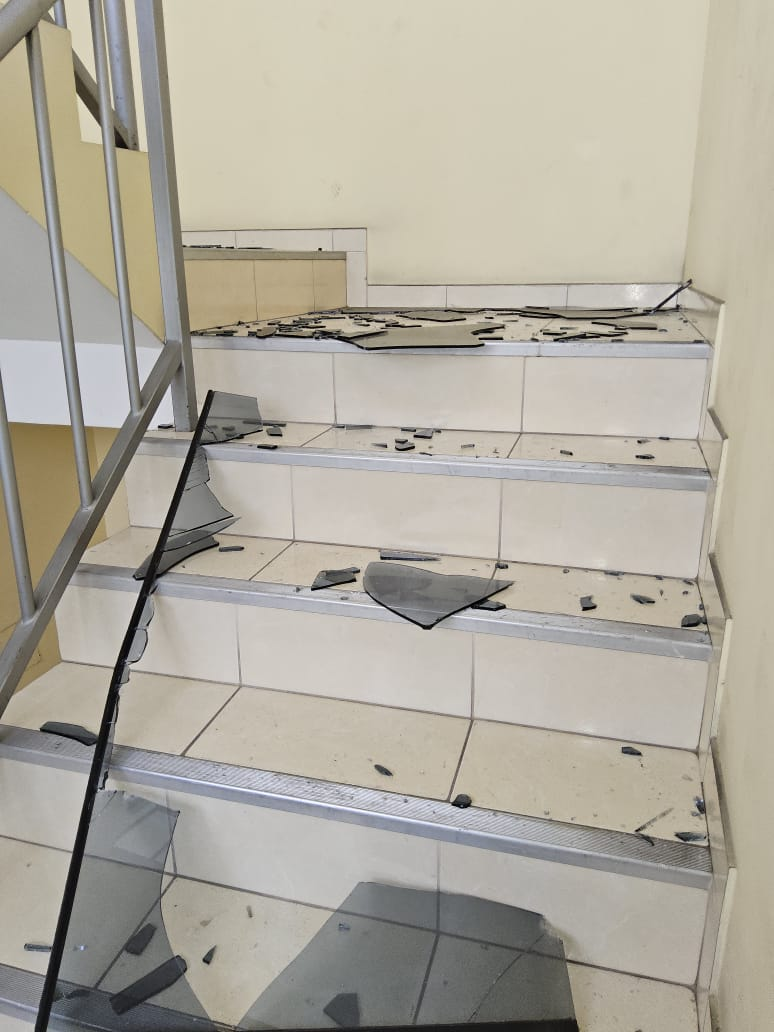
- Damage to a building in Lima

- Location within Peru Location within South America
- UTC time: 2025-06-15 16:35:23
- ISC event: 643530105
- USGS-ANSS: ComCat
- Local date: 15 June 2025
- Local time: 11:35:23 PET (UTC-5)
- Duration: 30 seconds
- Magnitude: M_{w} 5.6
- Depth: 40 km (25 mi)
- Epicenter: 12.166°S 77.442°W
- Areas affected: Lima metropolitan area, Peru
- Max. intensity: MMI VI (Strong)
- Aftershocks: 4.2 M_{w} and 3.6 M_{w}
- Casualties: 2 deaths, 135 injuries

On 15 June 2025, at 11:35:23 PET (16:35 UTC), a M_{w} 5.6 earthquake struck 37 km (23 mi) from the city of Callao in Peru, which is a part of the Lima metropolitan area. The earthquake killed two people and injured 135 others.

== Tectonic setting ==
Peru is located above the destructive boundary where the Nazca plate is being subducted beneath the South American plate along the line of the Peru–Chile Trench. The two plates are converging towards each other at a rate of about 78 mm or (3 inches) per year.

== Earthquake ==
Moment of the earthquake captured by a CCTV camera in a market in Villa el Salvador, Lima.

The earthquake had an epicenter located in the Pacific Ocean, 37 km (23 mi) from the city of Callao which is part of the Lima metropolitan area. It struck 40 km (25 mi) below the surface, and had a maximum Modified Mercalli intensity of VI (Strong) in San Isidro and V (Moderate) in Callao, Vitarte, Santiago de Surco, Lima, Urb. Santo Domingo and La Molina, and IV (Light) in Chosica and Huacho. The earthquake was followed 28 minutes later by a magnitude 3.6 aftershock. Another aftershock with a magnitude of 4.2 occurred the following day at 12:40 local time. According to the president of the department of the Geophysical Institute of Peru, at least four aftershocks minimally perceptible to humans had been recorded by June 16. However, this number increased to five on June 17 after a 3.7 magnitude earthquake was recorded shortly after midnight near the Ancón District in Lima.

== Damage and casualties ==
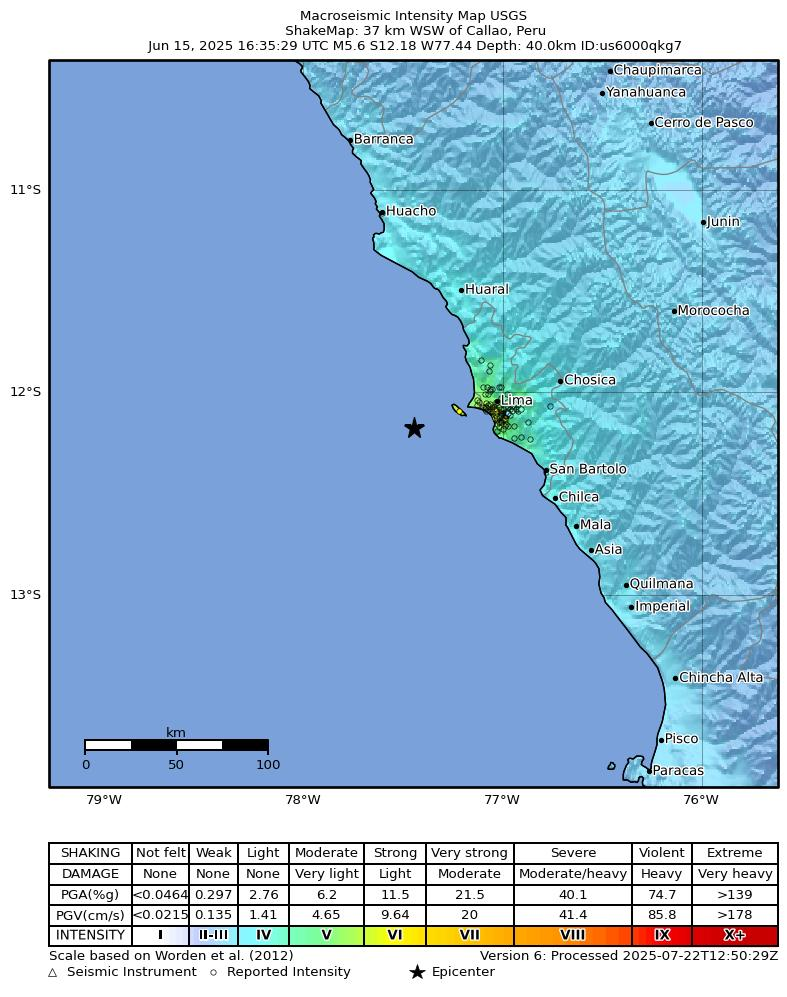
USGS ShakeMap showing the earthquake's intensity

One man in the Independencia District of Lima was killed after a wall collapsed onto his vehicle, another died in Callao, and 135 others were injured by the earthquake. Four houses were destroyed, 17 others were severely damaged, and 147 others were affected in the provinces of Callao, Lima, Huaura, Huaral and Huarochirí. Additionally, 94 schools, 37 health centers, eight care centers, a museum, 14 public offices and the Huaca Pucllana archaeological site and a road were damaged. Walls and roofs of homes and buildings, including a police station collapsed, and several malls and shopping centers were damaged in parts of Lima, where power and telephone services was cut for several hours. Landslides and rockfalls occurred in several areas including one which blocked the Costa Verde highway. A Peruvian Primera División soccer match between Deportivo Garcilaso and Sporting Cristal was briefly halted due to a nearby landslide, although no major damage was reported at the Estadio Alberto Gallardo, where the match was being played. Lima and Callao Metro service was temporarily paralyzed and a structure belonging to the Metropolitano's Balta Station collapsed. A Sunday Mass at Metropolitan Cathedral of Lima, led by cardinal Carlos Castillo Mattasoglio, had to be briefly evacuated due to the earthquake.

== See also ==
- List of earthquakes in 2025
- List of earthquakes in Peru
