= 1586 Lima–Callao earthquake =

Earthquake and tsunami in Peru

- Local date: 9 July 1586
- Magnitude: M_{w} 8.1; M_{t} 8.5
- Epicenter: 12.3°S 77.7°W
- Areas affected: Peru
- Max. intensity: MMI X (Extreme)
- Tsunami: 5 meters
- Casualties: 22 dead

The 1586 Lima–Callao earthquake (Spanish: Terremoto de Lima y Callao de 1586) was an earthquake that occurred on July 9 along the coast of Peru, near the capital Lima. A section of the Peruvian coast, stretching from Caravelí to Trujillo, north to south, was severely damaged by the earthquake. Major destruction occurred in the capital city Lima as well. The estimated moment magnitude (M_{w}) 8.1 earthquake triggered a locally damaging tsunami up to 5 m (16 ft). This was the first major earthquake to strike the city of Lima since its establishment in 1535.

== Tectonic setting ==
The coast of Peru lies a 7,000-km-long convergent boundary where the oceanic Nazca Plate subducts or dives beneath the continental South American Plate. The Peru–Chile Trench marks the location where the two plates meet and converge. Subduction at the plate boundary rate varies throughout the 7,000 km length, at 65 mm/yr towards the north, and up to 80 mm/yr in the south. The presence of active subduction can produce large earthquakes when elastic energy along the plate boundary (megathrust) is released suddenly after decades or centuries of accumulated strain. Earthquakes rupturing the megathrust are known as megathrust earthquakes; capable of generating tsunamis when there is sufficient and sudden uplift of the seafloor, in turn lead to the sudden displacement of the sea.

== Descriptions ==
The shock from the quake was felt at 19:00 local time on July 9, a Wednesday. The shock was accompanied by loud noises which frightened many residents, driving them out of their homes. Most residents were able to evacuate in time during the earthquake, such that the death toll was small, although there were many individuals that suffered injuries. When the quake struck, many of the residents were already out in the streets or gardens where they were safe from collapse. Damage and effects from the earthquake occurred over a 1,000 km long by 120 km wide area near the coast. The earthquake was also felt in the cities Cusco and Huánuco.

The earthquake reportedly caused the collapse of the towers of a cathedral in the city of Lima. Significant rockslides occurred at Cerro San Cristobal (es) in the Rímac District of Lima Province. The earthquake also severely damaged the residence of Fernando Torres de Portugal y Mesía, the then viceroy of Peru. Ground fissures formed in the city when the shaking was ongoing.

The associated tsunami was documented by the viceroy of Peru in which he said the waves picked up and smashed homes, and inundated up to 250 meters inland. Even when the waves retreated, parts of the city remained so flooded, it was impossible to ride a horse through them. At Callao, the earthquake and tsunami destroyed many docks and warehouses. Ships were dragged far inland during the tsunami inundation. Many trees and bushes were uprooted from the ground and deposited far inland by the tsunami.

== Earthquake characteristics ==
The 1586 earthquake ruptured a 175-km-long section of the Peru-Chile subduction zone, similar in size to the 1974 earthquake. The shock had an estimated moment magnitude (M_{w}) of 8.1, and a tsunami magnitude (M_{t}) of 8.5.

=== Tsunami ===
Older descriptions of the tsunami having a height of 24 to 26 meters have been debunked and concluded as exaggerations. A more accurate height of the tsunami has been estimated at 5 meters.

The tsunami was also confused as being an orphan tsunami reported along Japan's Sanriku coast due to erroneous cataloging of historical tsunamis, which also led to the confusion that it was from the 1586 Tenshō earthquake; a large Japanese earthquake. The presence of a tsunami at the Sanriku coast however, was reported in June 1585, now thought to be from the 1585 Aleutian Islands earthquake. At a monument in Tokura village near the Sanriku coast in Miyagi Prefecture, a stone monument stated that a tsunami between 1 and 2 meters in height struck the coast; the tsunami has been inferred to be of the 1585 event. Modelling of the tsunami from the 1586 earthquake in Peru suggest the tsunami was approximately 6 cm.

== See also ==
- List of earthquakes in Peru
- List of megathrust earthquakes
