= Nazca Ridge =

Submarine ridge off the coast of Peru

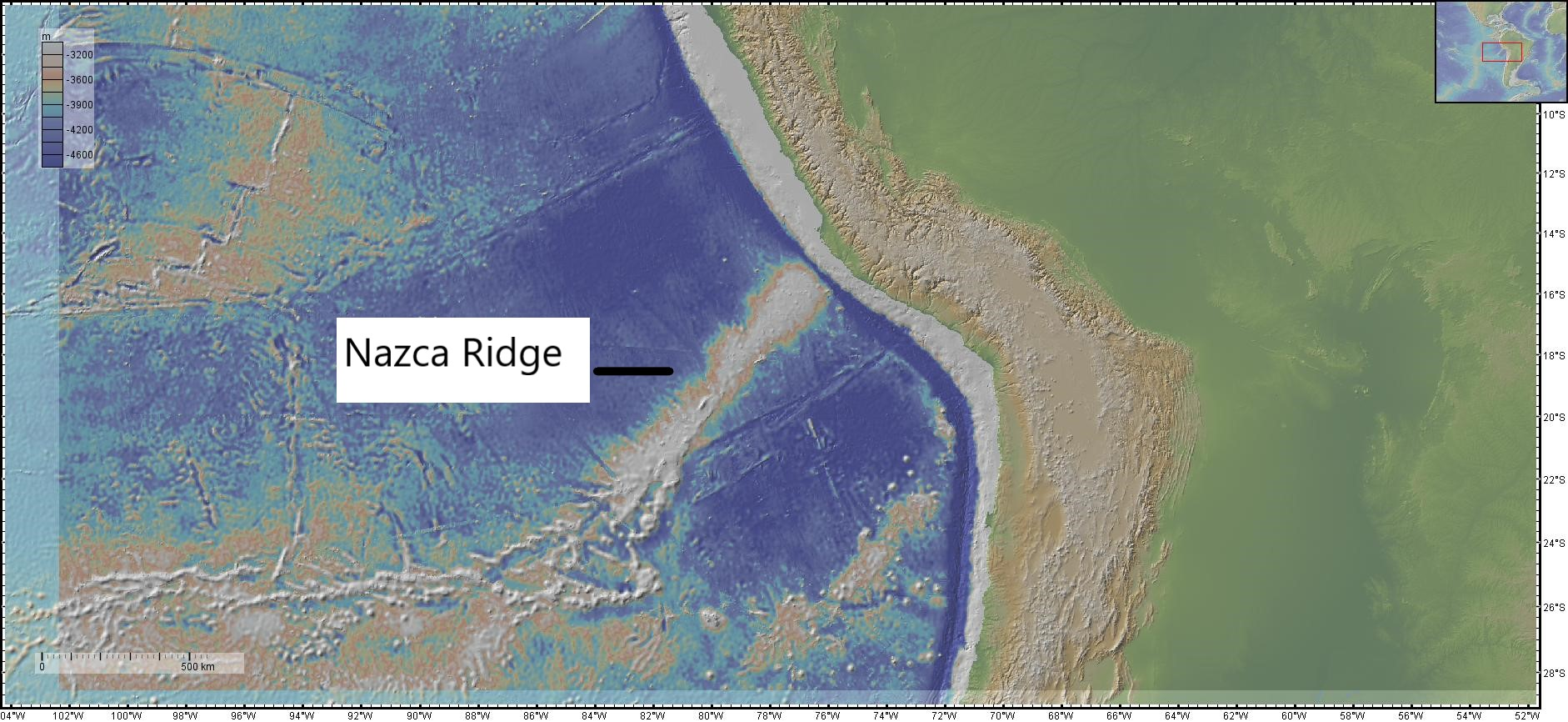
Map showing the location of Nazca Ridge off the west coast of Peru

The Nazca Ridge is a submarine ridge, located on the Nazca plate off the west coast of South America. This plate and ridge are currently subducting under the South American plate at a convergent boundary known as the Peru-Chile Trench at approximately 7.7 cm (3.0 in) per year. The Nazca Ridge began subducting obliquely to the collision margin at 11°S, approximately 11.2 Ma, and the current subduction location is 15°S. The ridge is composed of abnormally thick basaltic ocean crust, averaging 18 ±3 km thick. This crust is buoyant, resulting in flat slab subduction under Peru. This flat slab subduction has been associated with the uplift of Pisco Basin and the cessation of Andes volcanism and the uplift of the Fitzcarrald Arch on the South American continent approximately 4 Ma.

== Morphology ==
The Nazca Ridge is approximately 200 km (120 mi) wide, 1,100 km (680 mi) long, and has 1,500 m (4,900 ft) of bathymetric relief. The gradient of the slopes is 1-2 degrees. The ridge is located at a depth of 4,000 m (13,000 ft) below sea level, above the carbonate compensation depth. It is blanketed in a thin covering of 300 to 400 m (980 to 1,310 ft) thick pelagic calcareous ooze. Based on Rayleigh wave analysis, the ridge has an average crustal thickness of 18 ± 3 km, but could have a localized maximum thickness up to 35 km (22 mi). This is abnormally thick for oceanic crust. By comparison, the underlying Nazca plate adjacent to the ridge ranges from 6 to 8 km (3.7 to 5.0 mi) thick, and is comparable to the worldwide average of around 7 km (4.3 mi) thick.

== Formation ==
Based on basalt ages, the portion of the Nazca Ridge that is currently exposed dates from 31 ± 1 Ma at the Peru-Chile trench, to 23 ± 1 Ma where the Nazca Ridge and Easter Seamount Chain are adjacent. Basalt composition has also been used to show that the Nazca Ridge and Easter Seamount Chain formed from the same magma source, with the formation of the Easter Seamount Chain occurring after the Nazca plate changed direction. Formation began along the Pacific-Farallon/Nazca spreading center, and has been attributed to hot spot volcanism. There is some debate as to where this hot spot was originally located however, with locations near Easter Island and Salas y Gomez both being proposed. The ridge is primarily composed of mid-ocean ridge basalt, which erupted on the Nazca plate when the plate was already 5-13 Ma old. Based on isotopic ratios and rare earth element composition, it is estimated that the magma was sourced at approximately 95 km depth from a 7% partial melt. The Nazca Ridge has a conjugate feature on the Pacific plate, the Tuamotu Plateau. Magnetic anomalies have shown that there was symmetrical spreading at the Pacific-Farallon/Nazca center, so the Tuamotu Plateau can be used as a proxy for the pre-subducted Nazca Ridge geometry.

== Subduction and migration history ==
The Nazca plate began subducting into the Peru-Chile trench 11.2 Ma at 11°S. Due to the oblique orientation of the ridge to the Nazca-South American plate collision zone, the ridge has migrated south along the active margin to its current location at 15°S. Based on Tuamotu Plateau mirror relationship, it is estimated that 900 km (560 mi) of the Nazca Ridge has already subducted. The speed of migration has slowed over time, with the ridge migrating at 7.5 cm (3.0 in) per year until 10.8 Ma, then slowing to 6.1 cm (2.4 in) per year from 10.8-4.9 Ma. The current ridge migration rate is 4.3 cm (1.7 in) per year. The current plate subduction rate is 7.7 cm (3.0 in) per year.

== Continental margin interaction ==
The ridge is buoyant, resulting in flat slab subduction of the Nazca plate underneath Peru. Buoyancy is related to crustal age, and the buoyancy effect can be seen in oceanic crust aged from 30-40 Ma. The Nazca plate is dated to 45 Ma where it subducts into the Peru-Chile trench. The extreme thickness of the buoyant ridge is responsible for the flat slab subduction of the older underlying plate. Modelling has shown that this type of subduction is only concurrent with submarine ridges, and accounts for approximately 10% of convergent boundaries. The most recent estimate of the subduction angle for the Nazca plate is 20° to a depth of 24 km (15 mi) at 110 km (68 mi) inland. At 80 km (50 mi) depth, approximately 220 km (140 mi) inland, the plate shifts to a horizontal orientation, and continues to travel horizontally for up to 700 km (430 mi) inland, before resuming subduction into the asthenosphere.

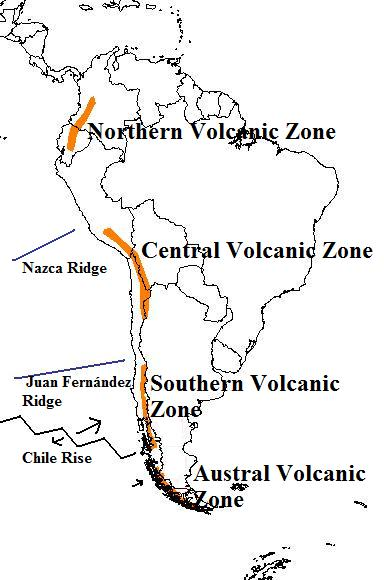
Image showing the lack of continental volcanism adjacent to subducting ridges

Large magnitude earthquakes occur in association with the area around the Nazca Ridge subduction zone, known at the Peru megathrust. These include, but are not limited to, a magnitude 8.1 earthquake in 1942, a magnitude 8.0 earthquake in 1970, a magnitude 7.7 earthquake in 1996, a magnitude 8.4 earthquake in 2001, and a magnitude 8.0 earthquake in 2007. Earthquake records for this area of subduction go back to 1586. All of these ruptures were located either on the coast of Peru or within the Peru-Chile Trench between 9°S and 18°S, coincidental with the subducting Nazca Ridge, and include both intraplate and interplate rupturing. No large earthquakes have been located between 14°S and 15.5°S, where the bathymetric high of the ridge is subducting. Interplate earthquakes do not occur in direct conjunction with the Nazca Ridge.

There has been little geomorphic affect to the Peru-Chile trench due to the ridge subduction beyond a shallowing from 6,500 to 5,000 m (21,300 to 16,400 ft) above the ridge location. However, this is a tectonic erosion margin. There is no accretionary wedge forming in the trench, and what sediment is found there is from continental sources, based on fossil assemblage. The calcareous ooze blanketing Nazca Ridge is completely subducted. Crustal erosion of the forearc basin has resulted in the loss of 110 km (68 mi) of the South American plate since 11 Ma.

The forearc basin of Pisco located above the subducting ridge has experienced uplift since the Late Pliocene or Pleistocene an uplift that is attributed to the subduction of the Nazca Ridge.

=== Influence in Amazon tectonics ===
The flat slab subduction associated with the Nazca Ridge has been linked to the cessation of volcanism in the Andes Mountains at about 4 Ma. The subduction has also been linked with the formation of the Fitzcarrald Arch, which is a 400,000 km^{2} (150,000 mi^{2}), 400 to 600 m (1,300 to 2,000 ft) high, domed topographic feature that defines the Amazon drainage Basin. Studies indicate that the uplift of the arch also began 4 Ma.

The uplift of the Fitzcarrald Arch intersects with the Andes Mountains where there is a shift from high-gradient topography to the low-gradient Amazon Basin. This topographic uplift effectively divides the Amazon drainage basin into three sub-basins, the Ucayali to the northwest, the Acre to the northeast, and the Madre De Dios to the southeast. It's hypothesized that significant modifications to sedimentary, erosional, and hydrological processes have resulted from the uplift of the Fitzcarrald Arch. Evolutionary paths for freshwater fish began to diverge in the Amazon sub-basins at approximately 4 Ma as well. The uplift of the Fitzcarrald Arch could also be the catalyst that led to these differing evolutionary paths, effectively isolating fish populations from each other.
