= 2014 Peru earthquake =

- Location within Peru
- UTC time: 2014-09-28 02:35:22
- ISC event: 605416848
- USGS-ANSS: ComCat
- Local date: September 27, 2014
- Local time: 21:35 local time (UTC-5)
- Magnitude: 4.9 M_{w}
- Depth: 6 km (3.7 mi)
- Epicenter: 13.78°S 71.88°W
- Type: Oblique-slip
- Areas affected: Andes village, Cusco Region, Peru
- Max. intensity: MMI VII (Very strong)
- Landslides: Yes
- Aftershocks: 3.6 M_{L} Sept 28 at 03:04
- Casualties: 8 dead

An earthquake struck near Misca, Peru at 21:35 local time on September 27. The shock had a moment magnitude of 4.9 and a maximum Mercalli intensity of VII (Very strong). The focal mechanism displayed primarily normal motion with a small left-lateral component. The event resulted in the deaths of 8 people and damaged or destroyed 60 homes in the region, with rock slides and power failures affecting the epicentral area.

Misca, a remote Andean village, was most affected by the quake. The small village experienced the collapse of around 45 homes. Four children and four adults were killed according to emergency workers. The president of Peru, President Ollanta Humala added that Misca, which was also 90% damaged, had been erected directly on a geological fault line and should be rebuilt in a different location after proper geographical survey of the area.

== See also ==
- List of earthquakes in 2014
- List of earthquakes in Peru
