= 1942 Peru earthquake =

- Location within Peru
- UTC time: 1942-08-24 22:50:31
- ISC event: 900444
- USGS-ANSS: ComCat
- Local date: August 24, 1942
- Local time: 17:50
- Magnitude: M_{w} 8.2
- Depth: 35 km (22 mi)
- Epicenter: 14.98°S 74.92°W
- Type: Megathrust
- Areas affected: Peru
- Max. intensity: MMI IX (Violent)
- Casualties: 30

The 1942 Peru earthquake occurred on August 24 at 17:50 local time and was located near the border of the departments of Ica and Arequipa, Peru. It had a magnitude of M_{w} 8.2 or M_{s} 8.4.

== Earthquake ==
This is a megathrust earthquake which ruptured part of the boundary between the Nazca plate and the South American plate. In this area, the Nazca plate is subducting beneath the South America Plate with a convergence vector of about 7.6 cm/yr. Much of the rupture zone of the 1942 earthquake overlapped with that of the 1996 Nazca earthquake. The rupture zone of the 1942 earthquake was about 40 km longer than that of the 1996 earthquake. The epicenter of the 1942 earthquake was very close to, but slightly southeast of, that of the 1996 earthquake. The energy released by the 1942 earthquake was about 2.5×10^{17} Nm.

=== Damage ===
The earthquake caused 30 deaths and 25 injuries. Building damage was noteworthy in the epicentral area. About 30% of the buildings in the city of Nazca were ruined. There were slides in the hills. The intensity reached IX (Violent).

=== Tsunami ===
This earthquake triggered a tsunami. In Callao, the amplitude of the oscillations of the tsunami was 1.6 m. In Lomas, the sea receded more than 200 m, and then it flooded the settlement with injuries reported.

== See also ==
- List of earthquakes in 1942
- List of earthquakes in Peru
