= 1687 Peru earthquake =

Seismic event

- Location within Peru
- Local date: 20 October 1687
- Magnitude: 8.7 M_{w}
- Epicenter: 15°12′S 75°54′W
- Areas affected: Peru
- Tsunami: Yes
- Casualties: 5,000

The 1687 Peru earthquake occurred at 11:30 UTC on 20 October 1687. It had an estimated magnitude of 8.4–8.7 and caused severe damage to Lima, Callao and Ica. It triggered a tsunami and overall, about 5,000 people died.

== Tectonic setting ==
The earthquake occurred along the boundary between the Nazca plate and the South American plate. The earthquake is likely to be a result of thrust faulting, caused by the subduction of the Nazca plate beneath the South American plate.

The coastal parts of Peru and Chile have a history of great megathrust earthquakes originating from this plate boundary, such as the 1960 Valdivia earthquake.

== Damage ==
The port of Pisco was completely destroyed by the tsunami, with at least three ships being swept over the remains of the town.

== Characteristics ==
The earthquake was probably followed by another large event further to the south. A magnitude of 8.7 has been estimated from tsunami runup heights and by comparison with the earthquake of 1974.

The tsunami was reported in Japan where it produced runups of tens of metres.

== Economic impact ==
Chile's history of exporting cereals to Peru dates back to the 1687 earthquake which coincided with both an earthquake with a stem rust epidemic in Peru. Given that Chilean soil and climatic conditions were better for cereal production than those of Peru and Chilean wheat was cheaper and of better quality than Peruvian wheat the 1687 events have been deemed only a detonant factor for exports to start.

In the 16th and 17th century, the principal wine growing area of the Americas was in the central and southern coast of Peru. In Peru, the largest wine-making centre was in the area of Ica and Pisco. The earthquake destroyed wine cellars and mud containers used for wine storage. This event marked a permanent decline in Peruvian winemaking.

== See also ==
- List of earthquakes in Peru
- List of historical earthquakes

== Sources ==
1. Beck, Susan L; Nishenko, Stuart P (1990). "Variations in the mode of great earthquake rupture along the Central Peru Subduction Zone". Geophysical Research Letters. 17 (11): 1969–1972. Bibcode:1990GeoRL..17.1969B. doi:10.1029/gl017i011p01969.
2. Collier, Simon; Sater, William F (2004), "1 – Colonial foundations, 1540–1810", A History of Chile: 1808–2002, CUP, p. 10, ISBN 978-0521534840
3. Cortés Olivares, Hernán F (2005). "El origen, producción y comercio del pisco chileno, 1546–1931" (PDF). Universum (in Spanish). 20 (2). Universidad de Talca, Chile: Instituto de Estudios Humanísticos: 42–81. doi:10.4067/S0718-23762005000200005.
4. Huertas Vallejos, Lorenzo (2004). "Historia de la producción de vinos y piscos en el Perú". Universum (in Spanish). 19 (2). Universidad de Talca, Chile: Instituto de Estudios Humanísticos: 44–61. doi:10.4067/S0718-23762004000200004.
5. Lacoste, Pablo (2004). "La vid y el vino en América del Sur: el desplazamiento de los polos vitivinícolas (siglos XVI al XX)". Universum (in Spanish). 19 (2). Universidad de Talca, Chile: Instituto de Estudios Humanísticos: 62–93. doi:10.4067/S0718-23762004000200005.
6. Okal, Emile A; Borrero, José C; Synolakis, Costas E (2006). "Evaluation of Tsunami Risk from Regional Earthquakes at Pisco, Peru" (PDF). Bulletin of the Seismological Society of America. 96 (5): 1634–1648. Bibcode:2006BuSSA..96.1634O. doi:10.1785/0120050158.
7. Villalobos, Sergio; Silva, Osvaldo; Silva, Fernando; Estellé, Patricio (1974), Historia de Chile (in Spanish), Chile: Editorial Universitaria, pp. 155–160
