= Peru–Chile Trench =

Oceanic trench in the Pacific Ocean off South America

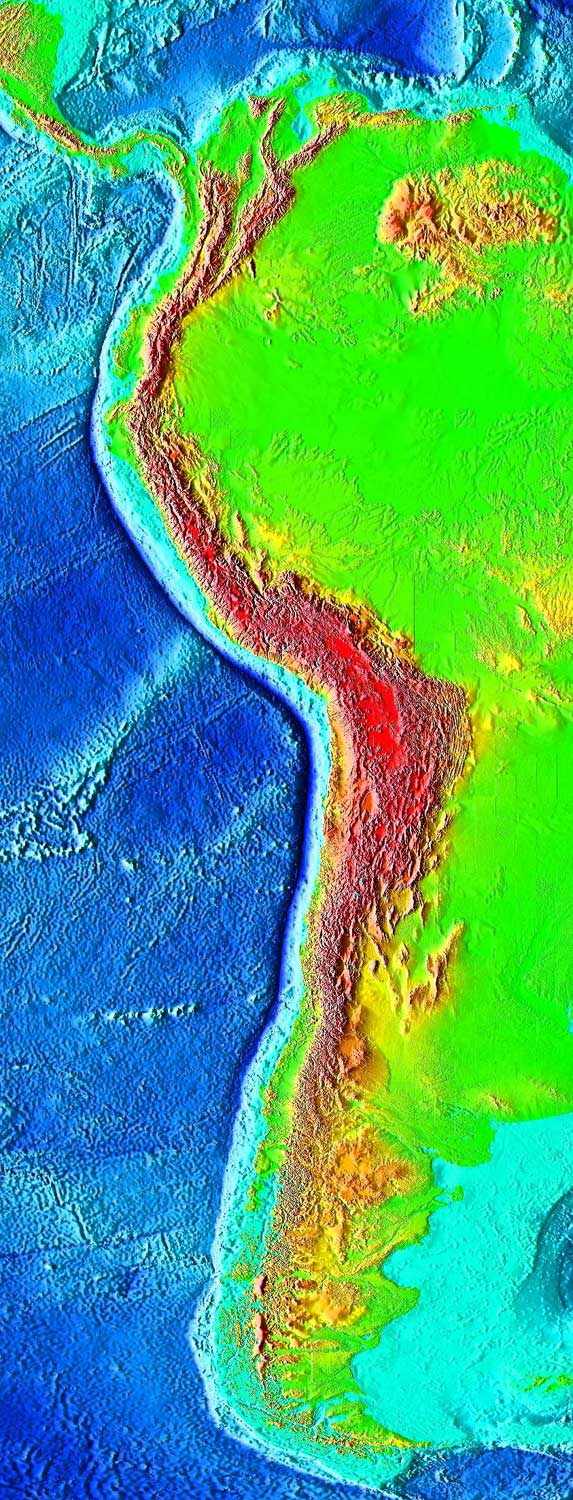
Peru–Chile Trench

The Peru–Chile Trench, also known as the Atacama Trench, is an oceanic trench in the eastern Pacific Ocean, about 160 kilometres (99 mi) off the coast of Peru and Chile. It reaches a maximum depth of 8,065 m (26,460 ft) below sea level in Richards Deep (23°10′45″S 71°18′41″W) and is approximately 5,900 km (3,666 mi) long; its mean width is 64 km (40 mi) and it covers an expanse of some 590,000 km^{2} (230,000 mi^{2}).

The trench delineates the boundary between the subducting Nazca plate and the overriding South American plate.

== Geology ==
The trench is a result of a convergent plate boundary, where the eastern edge of the oceanic Nazca plate is being subducted beneath the continental South American plate. The trench is also a part of the Chile triple junction, an unusual junction that consists of a mid-oceanic ridge and the Chile Rise being subducted under the South American plate at the Peru–Chile Trench. Two seamount ridges within the Nazca plate enter the subduction zone along this trench: the Nazca Ridge and the Juan Fernández Ridge.

From the Chile triple junction to Juan Fernández Ridge the trench is filled with 2.0–2.5 kilometres (1.2–1.6 mi) of sediments, creating a flat bottom topography. Sediments are mainly turbidites interspersed with oceanic deposits of clay, volcanic ash, and siliceous ooze.

The Peru–Chile Trench, the forearc and the western edge of the central Andean plateau (Altiplano), delineate the dramatic "Bolivian Orocline" that defines the Andean slope of southern Peru, northern Chile, and Bolivia.

== Oceanography ==
Most of the time, the trade winds drive surface waters offshore near the equator, driving the Humboldt Current from the tip of southern Chile to northern Peru. This current is associated with upwelling of deep, nutrient-rich water off the coast of Peru. At times, El Niño disrupts the usual wind pattern and lessens the upwelling. The consequent loss of nutrient causes fish kills.

== Biology ==
In 2018, three new species of snailfish were discovered thriving in the depths of the Atacama Trench.

In 2023, a predatory amphipod was discovered in the Atacama Trench.

== Associated seismicity ==
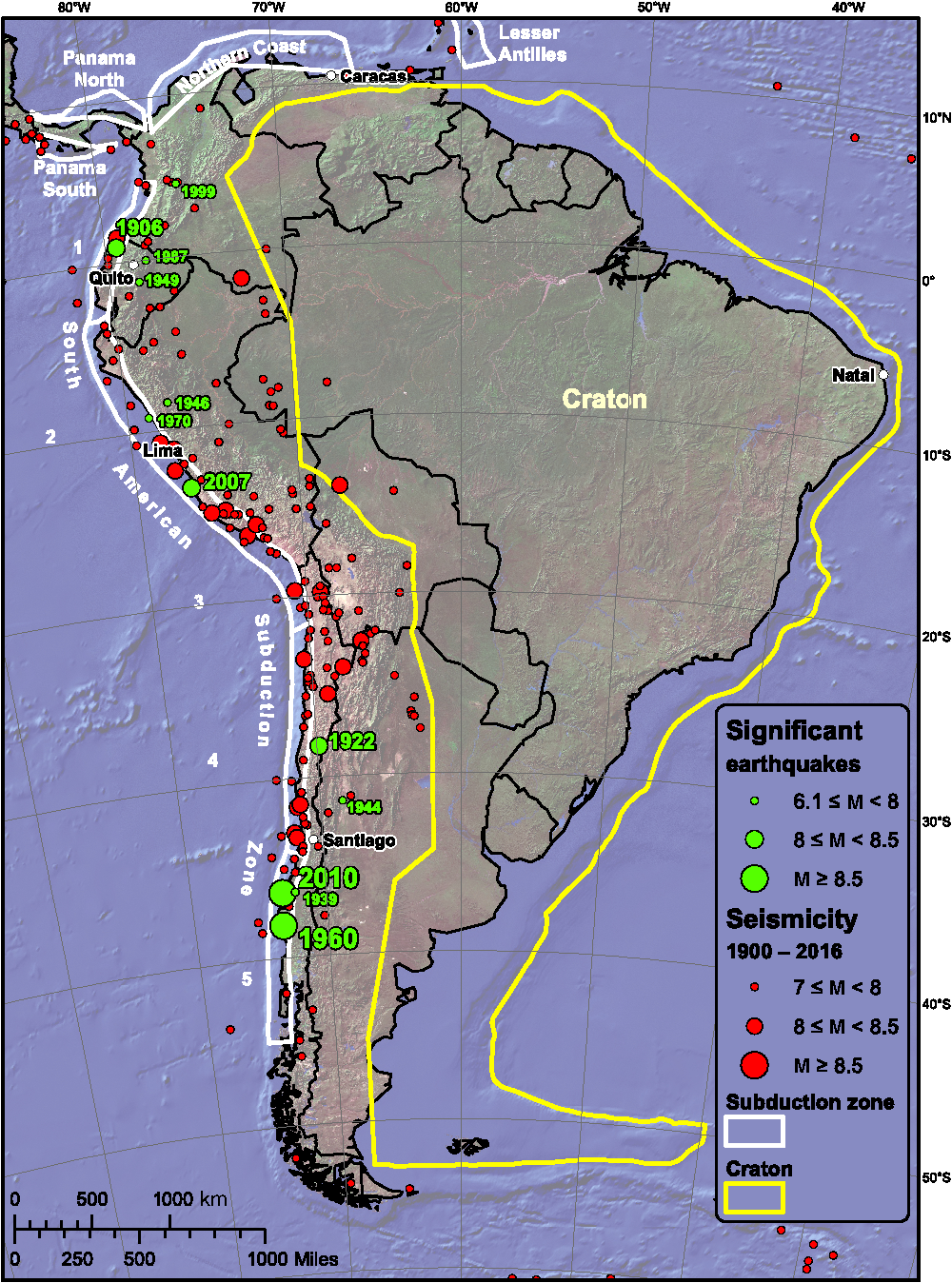
Significant Earthquake Faults and damaging earthquakes over the past century along the South American Subduction Zone

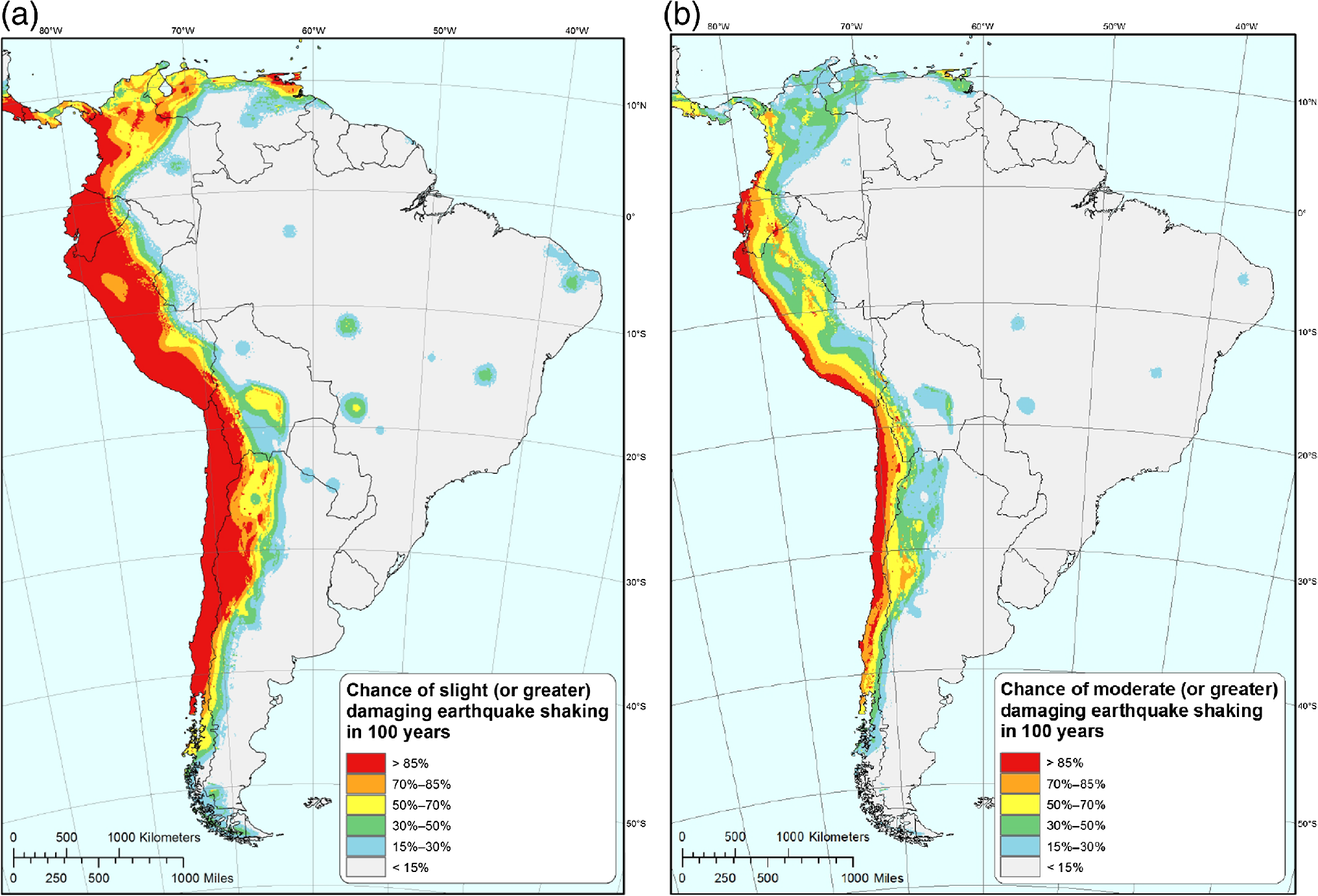
South America showing 100-year earthquake shaking projections.

The subduction of the Nazca plate below the South American plate along the Chile-Peru Trench is associated with numerous earthquakes. Several of these earthquakes are notable for their size, associated tsunamis, and landslides.

- 1570 Concepcion earthquake: M_{w} ~8.3
- 1687 Peru earthquake: M_{w} ~8.7
- 1730 Valparaíso earthquake M_{s} ~8.7
- 1746 Lima–Callao earthquake: M_{w} ~8.7
- 1868 Arica earthquake: M_{w} ~9.0
- 1877 Offshore Tarapaca, Peru: M_{w} ~8.3
- 1906 Valparaíso earthquake
- 1942 Peru earthquake: M_{w} 8.2 event associated with a tsunami, the rupture dimensions and epicenter are similar to those of a 1996 earthquake
- 1960 Valdivia earthquake: At M_{w} 9.5, the largest earthquake ever recorded on the earth
- November 1960 Peru earthquake: This event had a long source duration, leading to a significant discrepancy between different moment calculation methods (M_{s} 6.75 vs M_{w} 7.8)
- 1970 Ancash earthquake: This M_{w}7.9 event triggered a landslide with large snow and ice components, killing ~68,000 people
- 2001 southern Peru earthquake: M_{w} 8.4
- 2005 Tarapacá earthquake
- 2007 Tocopilla earthquake
- 2007 Peru earthquake: M_{w} 8.0
- 2010 Chile earthquake: M_{w} 8.8 event associated with a tsunami
- 2010 Pichilemu earthquakes
- 2014 Iquique earthquake
- 2015 Illapel earthquake

== See also ==
- Oceanic trench
- Pacific Ring of Fire
