= List of earthquakes in 2021 =

Earthquakes in 2021
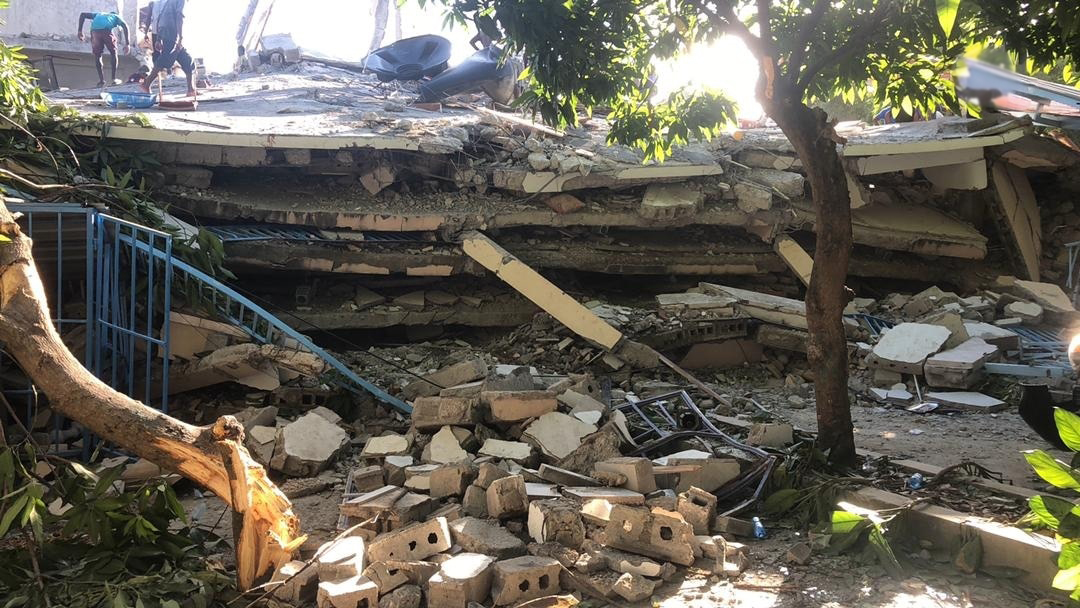
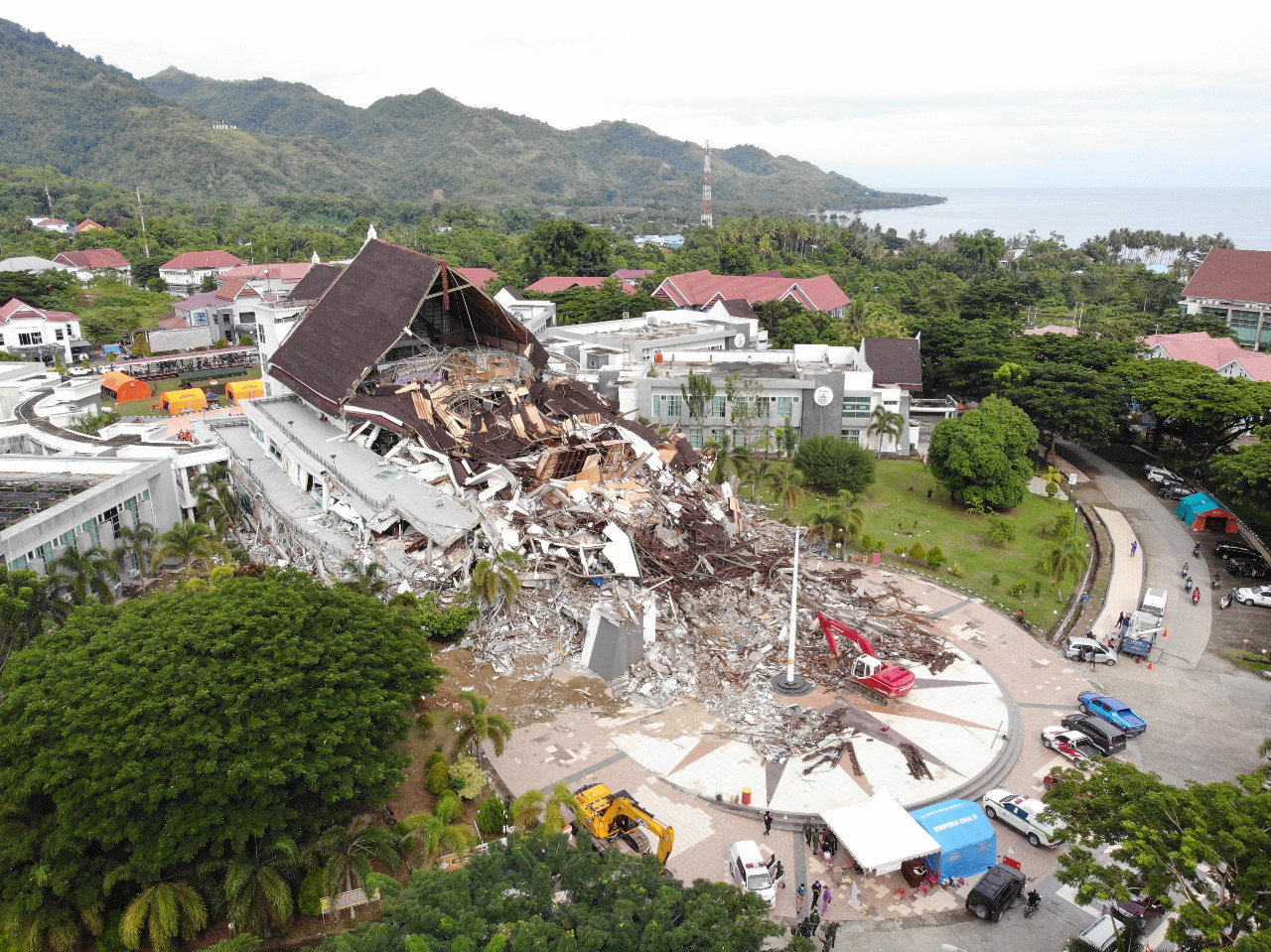
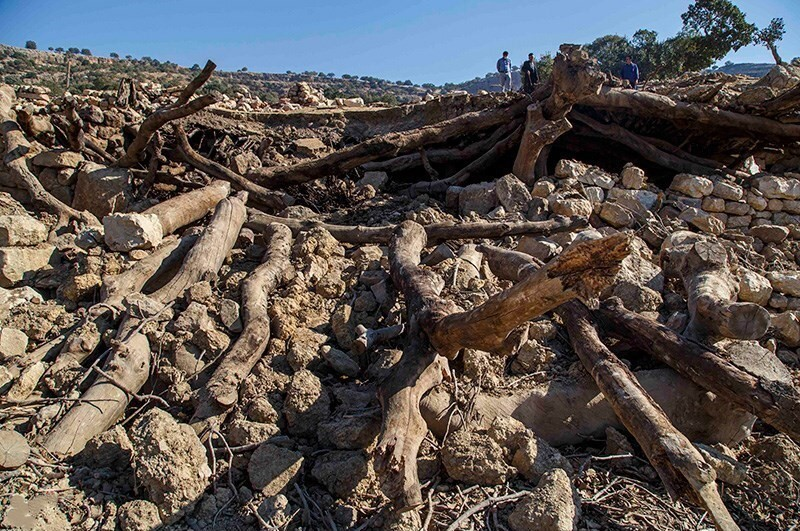
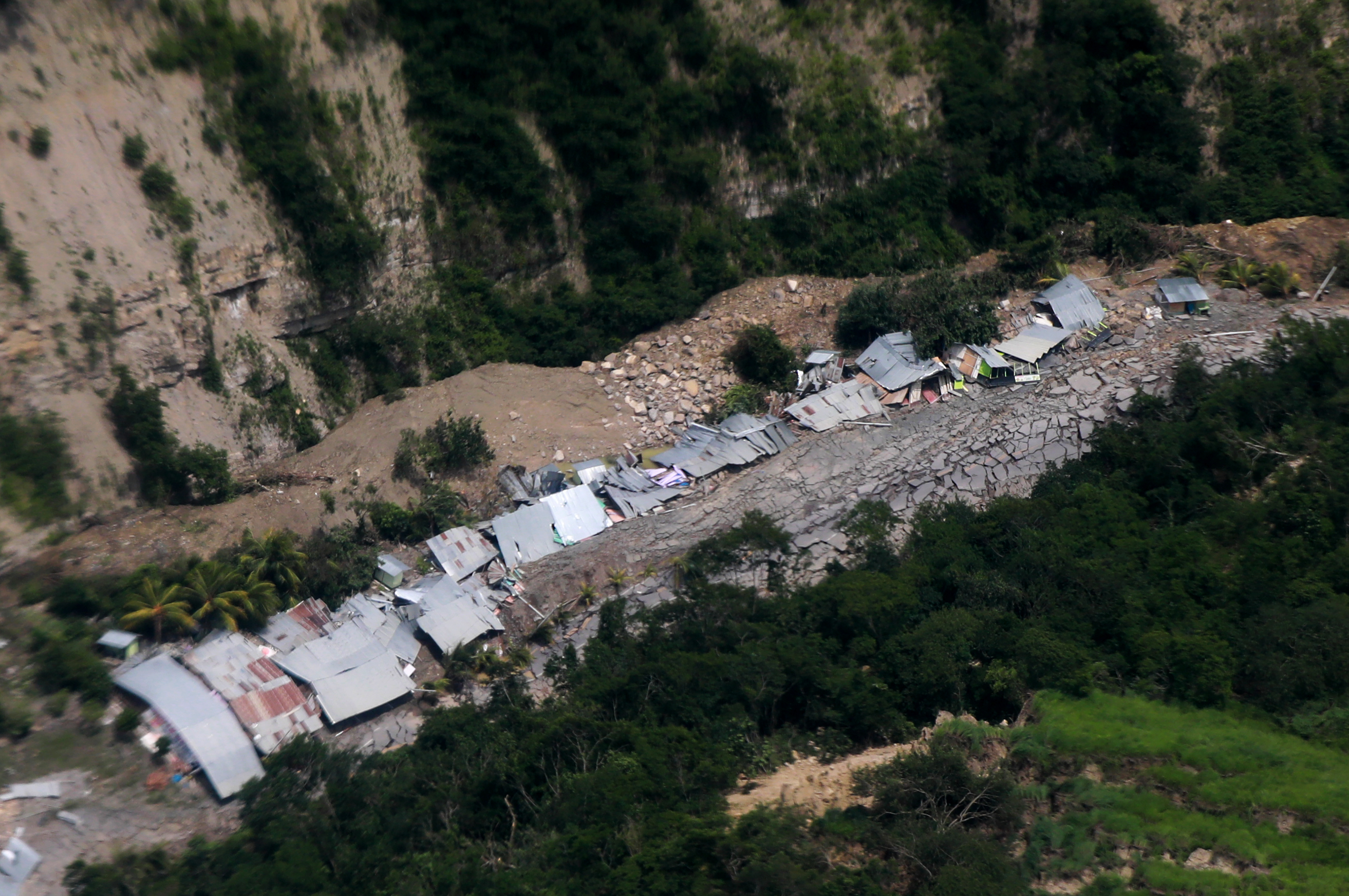
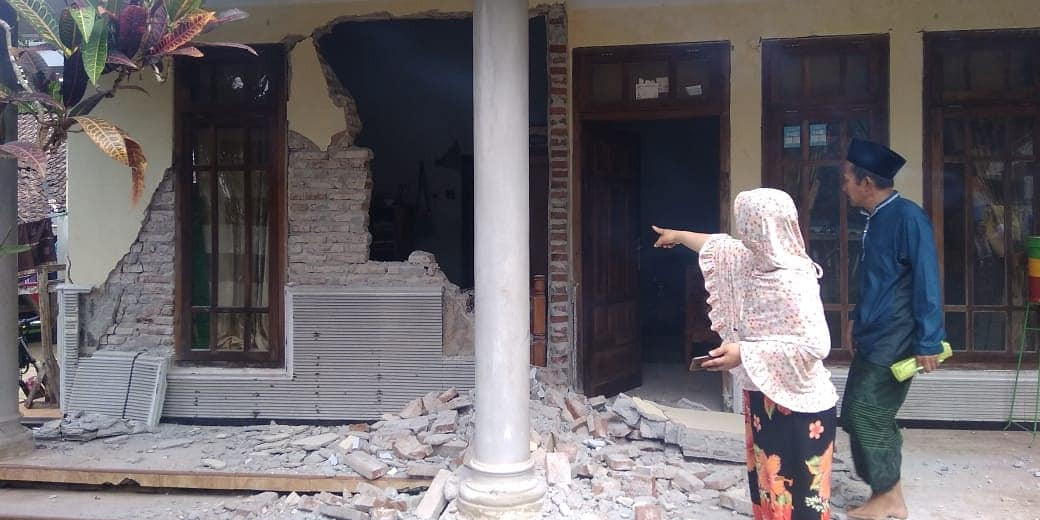
- From top, left to right: A building razed by the 2021 Haiti earthquake • West Sulawesi's gubernatorial building after the 2021 West Sulawesi earthquake • Destruction in Seresht, Iran • Collapsed homes and landslides triggered by the 2021 Northern Peru earthquake • Moderate damage to a house caused by the 2021 East Java earthquake

Approximate epicenters of notable earthquakes in 2021
- 4.0–5.9 magnitude
- 6.0–6.9 magnitude
- 7.0–7.9 magnitude
- 8.0+ magnitude
- Strongest: 8.2 M_{w} United States
- Deadliest: 7.2 M_{w} Haiti; 2,248 deaths
- Total fatalities: 2,491

Number by magnitude
- 9.0+: 0
- 8.0–8.9: 3
- 7.0–7.9: 17
- 6.0–6.9: 141
- 5.0–5.9: 2,046
- 4.0–4.9: 14,643

This is a list of earthquakes in 2021. Only earthquakes of magnitude 6 or above are included, unless they result in damage and/or casualties, or are notable for some other reason. All dates are listed according to UTC time. Maximum intensities are indicated on the Mercalli intensity scale.

The year 2021 was a very active period for global seismicity, with 19 major earthquakes, three of which were over 8.0, and was also the most seismically active since 2007. There were a total of 2,476 fatalities, with the majority from a M 7.2 in Haiti. Fatalities occurred in every month of the year. Earthquake activity was lowest in June, while August was the most active and deadliest month. Major events also took place in Indonesia, Japan, China, Pakistan, Mexico and Peru. A M 7.3 quake in China was the most intense event of the year (MMI X, Extreme). A rare 5.9 magnitude earthquake struck Victoria, Australia in September.

== Compared to other years ==
Number of earthquakes worldwide for 2011–2021
Magnitude	2011	2012	2013	2014	2015	2016	2017	2018	2019	2020	2021
8.0–9.9	1	2	2	1	1	0	1	1	1	0	3
7.0–7.9	19	14	17	11	18	16	6	16	9	9	17
6.0–6.9	187	117	123	143	124	127	104	118	135	112	141
5.0–5.9	2,486	1,546	1,460	1,580	1,413	1,550	1,447	1,671	1,484	1,319	2,046
4.0–4.9	13,129	10,955	11,877	15,817	13,777	13,700	10,544	12,782	11,897	12,216	14,658
Total	15,822	12,635	13,480	17,552	15,336	15,397	12,102	14,589	13,530	13,654	16,864

Map of earthquakes in 2021 - M 5.0 or greater (map data)

== By death toll ==
Rank	Death toll	Magnitude	Location	MMI	Depth (km)	Date	Event
1	2,248	7.2	Haiti, Nippes	VIII (Severe)	10.0	August 14	2021 Haiti earthquake
2	105	6.2	Indonesia, West Sulawesi	VI (Strong)	18.0	January 15	2021 West Sulawesi earthquake
3	42	5.9	Pakistan, Balochistan	VII (Very Strong)	9.0	October 6	2021 Balochistan earthquake
4	20	7.3	China, Qinghai	X (Extreme)	10.0	May 21	2021 Maduo earthquake
5	13	7.0	Mexico, Guerrero	VIII (Severe)	20.0	September 7	2021 Guerrero earthquake
6	12	7.5	Peru, Loreto	VIII (Severe)	112.5	November 28	2021 Northern Peru earthquake
7	10	6.0	Indonesia, East Java offshore	V (Moderate)	67.0	April 10	2021 East Java earthquake

Listed are earthquakes with at least 10 dead.

== By magnitude ==
Rank	Magnitude	Death toll	Location	MMI	Depth (km)	Date	Event
1	8.2	0	United States, Alaska offshore, Aleutian Islands	VII (Very strong)	32.2	July 29	2021 Chignik earthquake
2	8.1	0	New Zealand, Kermadec Islands offshore	VIII (Severe)	26.5	March 4	2021 Kermadec Islands earthquakes
2	8.1	0	South Georgia and the South Sandwich Islands offshore	VII (Very strong)	22.8	August 12	2021 South Sandwich Islands earthquakes
4	7.7	0	New Caledonia offshore, southeast of the Loyalty Islands	IV (Light)	10.0	February 10	2021 Loyalty Islands earthquake
5	7.5	12	Peru, Loreto	VIII (Severe)	112.5	November 28	2021 Northern Peru earthquake
5	7.5	0	South Georgia and the South Sandwich Islands offshore	VI (Strong)	63.3	August 12	2021 South Sandwich Islands earthquakes
7	7.4	0	New Zealand, Kermadec Islands offshore	VII (Very strong)	55.6	March 4	2021 Kermadec Islands earthquakes
7	7.4	0	South Georgia and the South Sandwich Islands offshore	-	26.0	August 12	-
8	7.3	20	China, Qinghai	X (Extreme)	10.0	May 21	2021 Maduo earthquake
8	7.3	1	Indonesia offshore, Flores Sea	VI (Strong)	18.4	December 14	2021 Flores earthquake
8	7.3	0	New Zealand, Gisborne offshore	VI (Strong)	10.0	March 4	-
8	7.3	0	Indonesia, Maluku offshore	VII (Very Strong)	166.9	December 29	-
8	7.3	0	Vanuatu region offshore	IV (Light)	535.8	October 2	-
13	7.2	2,248	Haiti, Nippes	VIII (Severe)	10.0	August 14	2021 Haiti earthquake
14	7.1	3	Japan, Miyagi offshore	VIII (Severe)	49.9	February 13	2021 Fukushima earthquake
14	7.1	1	Philippines, Mindanao offshore	VII (Very Strong)	55.1	August 11	2021 Davao Oriental earthquake
14	7.1	0	South Georgia and the South Sandwich Islands offshore	IV (Light)	6.0	August 22	-
17	7.0	13	Mexico, Guerrero	VIII (Severe)	12.6	September 8	2021 Guerrero earthquake
17	7.0	0	Japan, Miyagi offshore	VII (Very strong)	54.0	March 20	March 2021 Miyagi earthquake
17	7.0	0	Indonesia, North Sulawesi offshore	VI (Strong)	80.0	January 21	-

Listed are earthquakes with at least 7.0 magnitude.

== By month ==
=== January ===
January
- Strongest: 7.0 M_{w} Indonesia
- Deadliest: 6.2 M_{w} Indonesia; 105 deaths
- Total fatalities: 105

Number by magnitude
- 9.0+: 0
- 8.0–8.9: 0
- 7.0–7.9: 1
- 6.0–6.9: 11
- 5.0–5.9: 136
- 4.0–4.9: 1,021

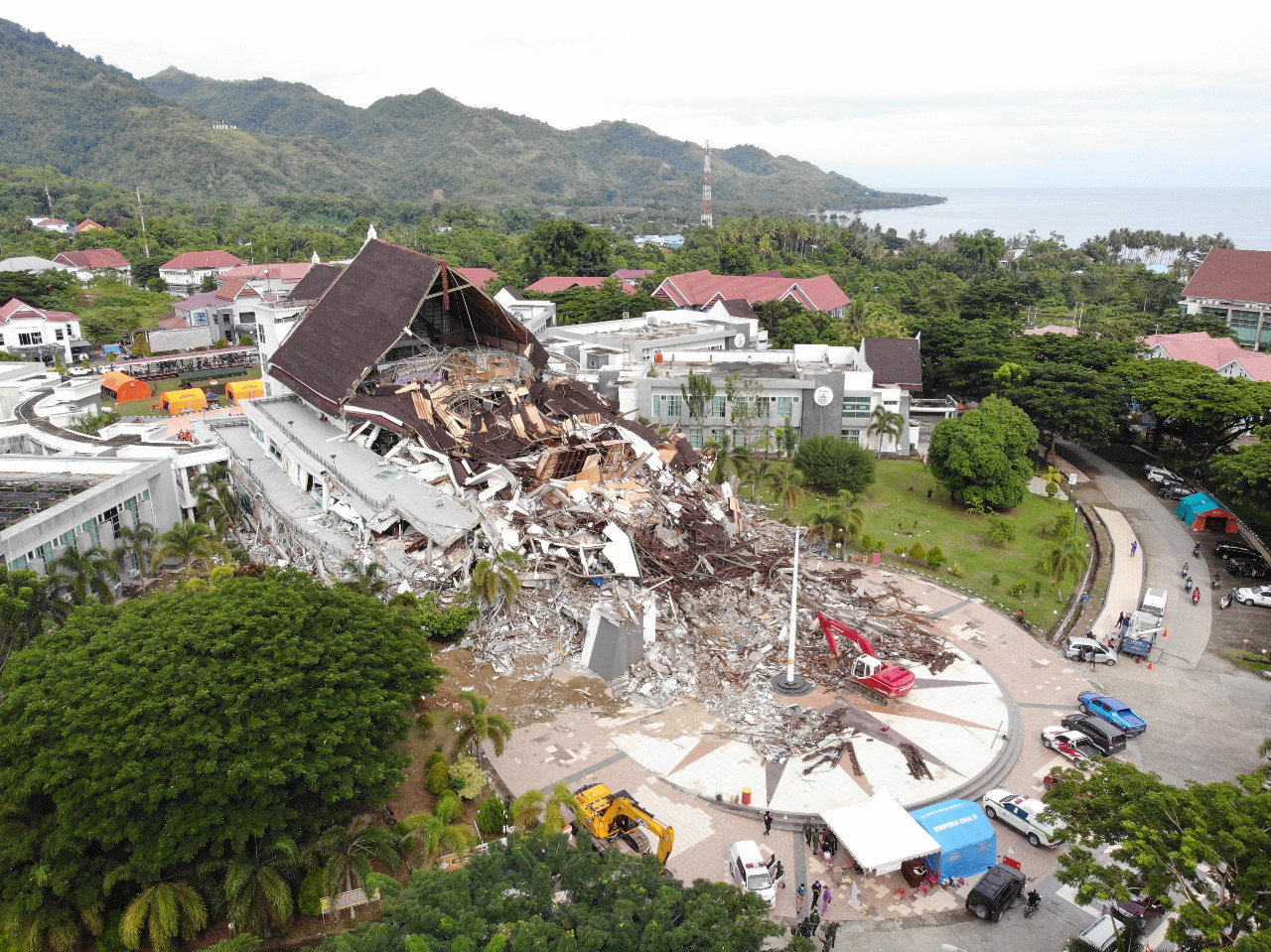
Drone view of West Sulawesi's Governor's Office Building, which collapsed due to the main shock on January 14.

Date	Country and location	M_{w}	Depth (km)	MMI	Notes	Casualties	
Date	Country and location	M_{w}	Depth (km)	MMI	Notes	Dead	Injured
3	Indonesia, Central Sulawesi, 138 km (86 mi) northwest of Kendari	5.0	10.0	VI	Some buildings were damaged in Morowali Regency. One person was injured.	-	1
3	United States, Alaska offshore, Aleutian Islands, 231 km (144 mi) west southwest of Adak	6.1	21.0	VI	-	-	-
6	New Zealand offshore, Kermadec Islands	6.2	37.1	IV	-	-	-
6	Croatia, Sisak-Moslavina, 3 km (1.9 mi) west of Petrinja	4.7	10.0	VIII	Aftershock of the 2020 Petrinja earthquake. Several buildings previously weakened by the December 29 event sustained additional damage.	-	-
6	Indonesia, Gorontalo offshore, 53 km (33 mi) south southwest of Gorontalo	6.1	148.0	IV	-	-	-
8	New Zealand offshore, Kermadec Islands	6.3	224.0	IV	-	-	-
8	Vanuatu, Tafea offshore, 146 km (91 mi) south southeast of Isangel	6.1	113.0	IV	-	-	-
10	Argentina, Jujuy, 32 km (20 mi) northwest of San Antonio de los Cobres	6.1	217.0	IV	-	-	-
10	Vanuatu, Malampa offshore, 50 km (31 mi) east of Lakatoro	6.1	160.0	IV	-	-	-
10	Turkey, Ankara, 11 km (6.8 mi) west of Kalecik	4.3	10.0	VII	Cracks appeared in several buildings.	-	-
11	Mongolia, Khövsgöl, 29 km (18 mi) south southwest of Khankh	6.7	10.0	IX	Further information: 2021 Khövsgöl earthquake	-	59
14	Indonesia, West Sulawesi, 33 km (21 mi) south of Mamuju	5.7	18.0	VII	Foreshock of the 6.2 quake a few hours later. Two houses and an emergency center were damaged in Mamuju. One person sustained injuries.	-	1
14	Indonesia, West Sulawesi, 32 km (20 mi) south of Mamuju	6.2	18.0	VI	Further information: 2021 West Sulawesi earthquake	105	6,489
15	Iran, Hormozgan, 50 km (31 mi) northeast of Bandar-e Lengeh	5.5	8.0	VII	At least 190 houses were damaged in Kong, and one person was injured.	-	1
16	Algeria, Oran offshore, 20 km (12 mi) northwest of Oran	3.2	40.0	-	In Oran, an old building partially collapsed.	-	-
19	Argentina, San Juan, 28 km (17 mi) southwest of Pocito	6.4	16.9	VII	Over 3,000 houses were destroyed and 30,000 others were damaged in San Juan province. Power disruptions were reported as well as landslides and damaged roads. Twenty people were injured, one of them seriously.	-	20
21	Indonesia, North Sulawesi offshore, 40 km (25 mi) northeast of Talaud Islands	7.0	80.0	VI	A few buildings in Talaud Islands Regency were damaged. In the neighboring Philippines, nine buildings, including three schools and two health facilities, were damaged on the island of Mindanao.	-	-
23	China, Yunnan, 57 km (35 mi) southwest of Xunchang	4.9	10.0	VI	Over a hundred homes received minor damage near the epicenter, and four people were injured by falling roof tiles.	-	4
23	Spain, Andalusia, 2 km (1.2 mi) west southwest of Santa Fe	4.2	10.0	V	Part of an earthquake swarm. Some houses were slightly damaged in Atarfe. One elderly man was injured by a fallen chimney.	-	1
23	Antarctica offshore, South Shetland Islands	6.9	9.8	V	Small tsunami waves were observed with a maximum height of 4 cm (1.6 in). A building was damaged at a Chilean scientific base in Antarctica.	-	-
24	New Zealand, Bay of Plenty, 16 km (9.9 mi) east of Rotorua	5.1	10.0	VI	It was a part of an earthquake swarm. Ten buildings were damaged in Lake Rotomā.	-	-
31	Guyana, Upper Takutu-Upper Essequibo, 82 km (51 mi) south southeast of Lethem	5.5	5.4	VI	The strongest earthquake ever recorded in Guyana. lt was felt in the states of Roraima and Amazonas in Brazil. Two homes destroyed and many others damaged in the Katoonarib area.	-	-

=== February ===
February
- Strongest: 7.7 M_{w} New Caledonia
- Deadliest: 7.1 M_{w} Japan; 3 deaths
- Total fatalities: 5

Number by magnitude
- 9.0+: 0
- 8.0–8.9: 0
- 7.0–7.9: 2
- 6.0–6.9: 14
- 5.0–5.9: 254
- 4.0–4.9: 1,183

Date	Country and location	M_{w}	Depth (km)	MMI	Notes	Casualties	
Date	Country and location	M_{w}	Depth (km)	MMI	Notes	Dead	Injured
3	West Chile Rise	6.7	10.0	IV	-	-	-
3	Indonesia, West Sulawesi, 37 km south southeast of Mamuju	4.9	10.0	VI	Aftershock of the 2021 West Sulawesi earthquake. Further damage and a 61-year-old man was killed.	1	-
3	Guinea, Kindia, 41 km northwest of Kindia	5.0	10.0	VI	Many buildings were damaged in the Kindia region.	-	-
5	Armenia, Gegharkunik, 9 km southwest of Vahan	5.2	10.0	VII	Many houses were damaged, some which were left uninhabitable.	-	-
7	Philippines, Davao, 9 km west of Magsaysay	6.0	16.0	VII	Further information: 2021 Davao del Sur earthquake	-	14
7	Papua New Guinea, Manus offshore, 193 km southwest of Lorengau	6.3	10.0	IV	-	-	-
9	Turkey, Konya, 15 km northwest of Tuzlukçu	4.8	10.0	VIII	Three houses in Tuzlukçu were damaged.	-	-
10	New Caledonia offshore, southeast of the Loyalty Islands	6.1	11.0	-	Foreshock of the 7.7 quake one hour later.	-	-
10	Indonesia, Bengkulu offshore, 216 km south southwest of Bengkulu	6.3	10.0	IV	-	-	-
10	New Caledonia offshore, southeast of the Loyalty Islands	6.1	10.0	-	Foreshock of the 7.7 quake eighteen minutes later.	-	-
10	New Caledonia offshore, southeast of the Loyalty Islands	7.7	10.0	IV	Further information: 2021 Loyalty Islands earthquake	-	-
10	New Caledonia offshore, southeast of the Loyalty Islands	6.1	11.7	-	Aftershocks of the 7.7 quake a few hours earlier.	-	-
10	New Caledonia offshore, southeast of the Loyalty Islands	6.1	14.0	-	Aftershocks of the 7.7 quake a few hours earlier.	-	-
10	New Caledonia offshore, southeast of the Loyalty Islands	6.3	12.0	III	Aftershocks of the 7.7 quake a few hours earlier.	-	-
11	New Caledonia offshore, southeast of the Loyalty Islands	6.0	10.0	-	Aftershocks of the 7.7 quake a few hours earlier.	-	-
12	Tajikistan, Gorno-Badakhshan, 37 km west of Murghob	5.9	99.0	IV	In Pakistan, dozens of buildings cracked in Muzaffarabad, and in Haripur District, a woman fell and died while she was running in a panic, and six other people were injured. In Kupwara district, in India's Jammu and Kashmir, at least 19 houses cracked, while in Kazakhstan, several buildings were damaged in Taraz.	1	6
13	Armenia, Ararat, Hovtashen	4.9	10.0	VI	The earthquake was felt in the capital Yerevan, where more than 3,000 buildings were reported to have been damaged, and some collapsed. At least 27 people were injured.	-	27
13	Japan, Miyagi offshore, 73 km east northeast of Namie	7.1	44.1	VIII	Further information: 2021 Fukushima earthquake	3	185
16	Vanuatu, Shefa offshore, 77 km west of Port Vila	6.2	5.6	IV	Cracks appeared in the dormitory of a school in Port Vila.	-	-
17	Greece, Central Region, 11 km north of Kamárai	5.5	5.3	VIII	One building was damaged in Patras.	-	-
17	Iran, Isfahan, 27 km northwest of Yasuj	5.4	10.0	VII	Further information: 2021 Sisakht earthquake	-	63
17	New Caledonia offshore, southeast of the Loyalty Islands	6.1	12.6	-	Aftershock of the 7.7 quake on February 10.	-	-
18	Vanuatu, Tafea offshore, 135 km south southwest of Port Vila	6.2	14.0	IV	-	-	-
18	France, Wallis and Futuna offshore, 158 km east southeast of Alo	6.1	3.7	IV	-	-	-
24	Iran, Isfahan, 26 km northwest of Yasuj	4.9	10.0	V	Aftershock of the 2021 Sisakht earthquake. Additional damage and fourteen people were injured due to panic.	-	14
26	Indonesia, North Maluku, 147 km south of Sofifi	5.0	10.0	-	Many buildings, including a hospital and several government buildings were damaged in South Halmahera Regency. Three people were injured.	-	3

=== March ===
March
- Strongest: 8.1 M_{w} New Zealand
- Deadliest: 5.3 M_{w} China; 3 deaths 5.1 M_{w} Colombia; 3 deaths
- Total fatalities: 7

Number by magnitude
- 9.0+: 0
- 8.0–8.9: 1
- 7.0–7.9: 3
- 6.0–6.9: 14
- 5.0–5.9: 340
- 4.0–4.9: 1,749

Date	Country and location	M_{w}	Depth (km)	MMI	Notes	Casualties	
Date	Country and location	M_{w}	Depth (km)	MMI	Notes	Dead	Injured
1	Colombia, Antioquia, 20 km southwest of Urrao	5.1	10.0	VI	Various houses were damaged and some destroyed in Antioquia. One person died in Medellín after falling from a roof during the earthquake, while another died from a heart attack, and another died from a landslide at Retiro, and at least 6 people were injured.	3	6
3	Greece, Thessalia, 9 km west of Týrnavos	6.3	8.0	VIII	Further information: 2021 Larissa earthquake	1	11
4	New Zealand, Gisborne offshore, 174 km northeast of Gisborne	7.3	10.0	VI	At least 27 buildings were damaged in Gisborne. A tsunami warning was issued for Gisborne District from Hicks Bay to Tokomaru Bay, along with nearby river estuaries, then lifted. Tsunami waves with heights up to 28 cm (11 in) were observed in East Cape, New Zealand.	-	-
4	Vanuatu, Torba offshore, 69 km north northeast of Port Olry	6.1	173.3	IV	-	-	-
4	New Zealand, Kermadec Islands offshore	7.4	43.0	VII	Foreshock of the 8.1 quake a few hours later. Tsunami waves with heights up to 31 cm (12 in) were observed in Raoul Island, New Zealand.	-	-
4	New Zealand, Kermadec Islands offshore	8.1	28.9	VIII	Further information: 2021 Kermadec Islands earthquake	-	Several
4	New Zealand, Kermadec Islands offshore	6.1	10.0	III	Aftershock of the 8.1 quake one hour earlier.	-	-
4	Greece, Thessalia, 11 km east of Verdikoussa	5.8	10.0	VIII	Aftershock of the 6.3 quake the day before. Additional damage and some empty houses collapsed.	-	-
4	New Zealand, Kermadec Islands offshore	6.5	10.0	III	Aftershocks of the 8.1 quake a few hours earlier.	-	-
5	New Zealand, Kermadec Islands offshore	6.3	17.0	IV	Aftershocks of the 8.1 quake a few hours earlier.	-	-
5	New Zealand, Kermadec Islands offshore	6.2	10.0	III	Aftershocks of the 8.1 quake a few hours earlier.	-	-
6	New Zealand, Gisborne offshore, 179 km northeast of Gisborne	6.3	13.0	V	Aftershock of the 7.3 quake on March 4.	-	-
6	New Zealand, Kermadec Islands offshore	6.1	10.3	IV	Aftershocks of the 8.1 quake on March 4.	-	-
6	New Zealand, Kermadec Islands offshore	6.2	10.0	VI	Aftershocks of the 8.1 quake on March 4.	-	-
6	New Zealand, Kermadec Islands offshore	6.1	10.0	VI	Aftershocks of the 8.1 quake on March 4.	-	-
6	Peru, Arequipa, 17 km east southeast of Iray	4.9	10.0	VI	About 70 adobe houses were damaged in Huambo district, and 10 were destroyed. Some landslides also blocked roads.	-	-
11	Tanzania, Mara, 25 km south southwest of Tarime	4.8	10.0	V	Around 50 students were injured in a stampede caused by the earthquake in Kisii, in neighbouring Kenya.	-	50
14	South Georgia and the South Sandwich Islands offshore, South Sandwich Islands region	6.0	10.0	III	-	-	-
14	Turkmenistan, Ahal, 39 km southwest of Baharly	4.5	10.0	V	One house collapsed and 65 others were damaged in Raz and Jargalan County, in neighboring Iran.	-	-
16	Russia, Kamchatka offshore, 176 km south southeast of Ust’-Kamchatsk Staryy	6.6	22.1	V	-	-	-
18	Algeria, Bejaia offshore, 20 km north northeast of Bejaïa	6.0	8.0	VII	At least 1,789 buildings were damaged in 12 provinces, most of them slightly. Twelve people were injured while fleeing in a panic, and also by jumping through windows. A small tsunami was also observed, with heights of 6 cm (0.20 ft) in the Balearic Islands.	-	12
19	China, Tibet, 95 km northeast of Nagqu	5.7	8.0	VII	At least 4,753 houses were damaged or destroyed in Tibet, including some office blocks which suffered cracked walls.	-	-
20	Mexico, Guerrero, 7 km north of Marquelia	5.7	28.3	VI	Two homes cracked in the municipality of Ayutla de los Libres. Another three residences had fractured walls. Trees were downed and a roof detached off of a structure.	-	-
20	Australia offshore, west of Macquarie Island	6.1	10.0	II	-	-	-
20	Japan, Miyagi offshore, 27 km east northeast of Ishinomaki	7.0	54.0	VII	Further information: March 2021 Miyagi earthquake	-	11
21	Germany, Baden-Württemberg, 3.1 km northwest of Albstadt	3.9	16.0	-	Three buildings were damaged in Albstadt.	-	-
23	Greece, Western Macedonia, 20 km northeast of Kónitsa	4.4	10.0	II	The earthquake damaged four buildings in the nearby village of Samaria, including two churches and a school.	-	-
23	China, Xinjiang, 100 km northeast of Aksu	5.3	10.0	VI	Three people were killed and 65 houses were damaged, livestock sheds also collapsed.	3	-

=== April ===
April
- Strongest: 6.6 M_{w} South Sandwich Islands
- Deadliest: 6.0 M_{w} Indonesia; 10 deaths
- Total fatalities: 12

Number by magnitude
- 9.0+: 0
- 8.0–8.9: 0
- 7.0–7.9: 0
- 6.0–6.9: 14
- 5.0–5.9: 130
- 4.0–4.9: 1,134

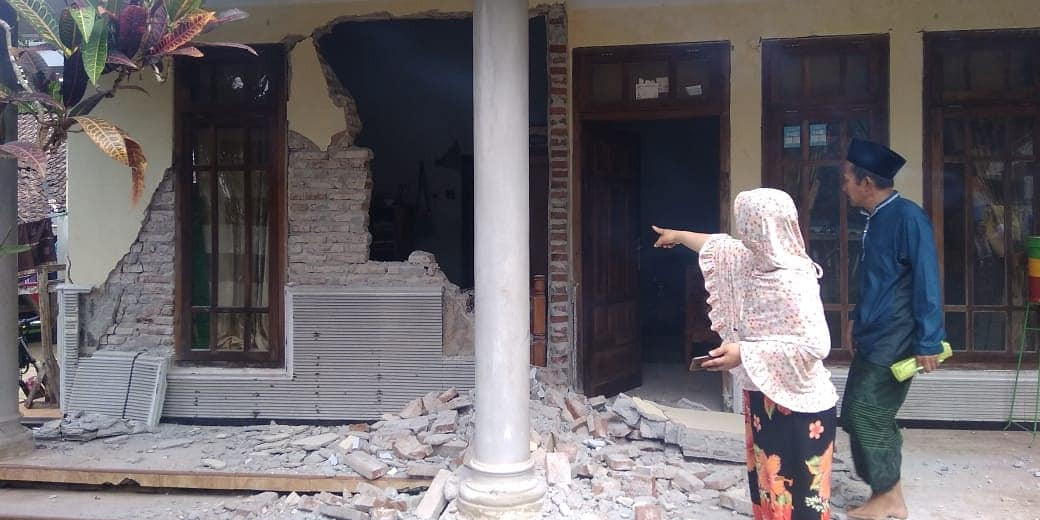
Damage to the exterior of a building in Malang Regency.

Date	Country and location	M_{w}	Depth (km)	MMI	Notes	Casualties	
Date	Country and location	M_{w}	Depth (km)	MMI	Notes	Dead	Injured
1	New Zealand, Kermadec Islands offshore	6.5	20.0	IV	Aftershock of the 8.1 quake on March 4.	-	-
1	Algeria, Guelma, 20 km west southwest of Guelma	4.8	10.0	VII	Some houses were badly damaged in Guelma province, and rockslides occurred.	-	-
1	Tonga offshore, Fiji region	6.0	595.0	II	-	-	-
3	South Georgia and the South Sandwich Islands offshore, east of South Sandwich Islands	6.6	10.0	I	-	-	-
4	Namibia, Kunene, 68 km north northwest of Khorixas	5.4	6.0	VII	Some structural damage was reported, and many houses suffered cracks.	-	-
5	New Zealand, Gisborne offshore, 193 km northeast of Gisborne	6.1	10.0	V	Aftershock of the 7.3 quake on March 4.	-	-
6	Iraq, Sulaymaniyah, 6 km northeast of Baynjiwayn	5.2	9.3	VII	Some 302 houses were damaged in Marivan, in neighbouring Iran. Four people were injured.	-	4
7	New Zealand, Kermadec Islands offshore	6.1	10.0	III	Aftershock of the 8.1 quake on March 4.	-	-
10	Indonesia, East Java offshore, 45 km south of Sumberpucung	6.0	67.0	V	Further information: 2021 East Java earthquake	10	104
10	Philippines offshore, Celebes Sea, 168 km south southwest of Sarangani	6.1	311.3	III	-	-	-
10	Papua New Guinea, Madang offshore, 195 km north of Madang	6.0	10.0	IV	-	-	-
18	Iran, Bushehr, 24 km north northeast of Bandar-e Genāveh	5.8	8.0	VIII	Over 400 homes were damaged in Bandar Ganaveh, and five people were injured.	-	5
20	Indonesia, North Sumatra offshore, 255 km south of Sinabang	6.1	9.0	IV	-	-	-
24	Tonga, Ha'apai offshore, 223 km west northwest of Pangai	6.5	301.0	IV	These two earthquakes of the same intensity in a day can be considered a doublet earthquake.	-	-
25	Tonga, Tongatapu offshore, 205 km west southwest of Haveluloto	6.5	246.0	IV	These two earthquakes of the same intensity in a day can be considered a doublet earthquake.	-	-
27	Papua New Guinea, East Sepik offshore, 174 km east northeast of Angoram	6.1	10.0	IV	-	-	-
27	Indonesia, West Java, 60 km west southwest of Banjar	5.0	57.4	IV	Two unoccupied homes in the Sukabumi Regency collapsed while five other houses were severely damaged. There were no casualties reported.	-	-
28	India, Assam, 9 km north northwest of Dhekiajuli	6.0	34.0	VI	Further information: 2021 Assam earthquake	2	12
29	New Zealand, Kermadec Islands offshore	6.1	10.0	III	Aftershock of the 8.1 quake on March 4.	-	-

=== May ===
May
- Strongest: 7.3 M_{w} China
- Deadliest: 7.3 M_{w} China; 20 deaths
- Total fatalities: 24

Number by magnitude
- 9.0+: 0
- 8.0–8.9: 0
- 7.0–7.9: 1
- 6.0–6.9: 12
- 5.0–5.9: 128
- 4.0–4.9: 1,196

Date	Country and location	M_{w}	Depth (km)	MMI	Notes	Casualties	
Date	Country and location	M_{w}	Depth (km)	MMI	Notes	Dead	Injured
1	Japan, Miyagi offshore, 38 km east southeast of Ishinomaki	6.9	47.3	VI	Three people were injured by the strong shaking.	-	3
2	Indonesia, West Sumatra, 160 km south southwest of Padang	5.5	21.0	V	An emergency room at a hospital in the Mentawai Islands Regency suffered cracks.	-	-
5	Indonesia, West Sumatra, 137 km south southwest of Padang	5.7	23.1	V	The earthquake caused further damage at the same hospital, affected by May 2 event. Several electric generators were affected, resulting in power outages.	-	-
7	Australia offshore, west of Macquarie Island	6.0	10.0	-	-	-	-
7	Iran, Kordestan, 27 km north northwest of Paveh	4.4	10.0	-	Fifty homes were damaged and one collapsed in Sarvabad.	-	-
7	Fiji, Lau offshore	6.1	378.6	III	-	-	-
12	El Salvador, Sonsonate offshore, 55 km southwest of Acajutla	6.0	22.0	IV	-	-	-
12	(France) Mauritius - Reunion region	6.7	10.0	III	-	-	-
12	Peru, Ica, 1 km southeast of Pampa de Tate	5.5	34.3	V	Twelve buildings were damaged in Ica.	-	-
13	Panama, Chiriquí offshore, 151 km south southeast of Punta de Burica	6.0	10.0	IV	-	-	-
13	Japan, Miyagi offshore, 73 km east northeast of Namie	6.0	32.0	IV	Aftershock of the 2021 Fukushima earthquake.	-	-
14	Indonesia, North Sumatra offshore, 260 km south of Sinabang	6.7	11.0	IV	-	-	-
15	Italy, Umbria, 1 km southeast of Cipolleto	4.1	10.8	-	Ten houses were damaged, with cracks in walls.	-	-
17	Iran, North Khorasan, 55 km west southwest of Bojnurd	5.4	10.0	VII	At least 46 houses were destroyed and over 1,900 others were damaged, and 32 people were injured.	-	32
18	Nepal, Gandaki, 35 km east of Pokhara	5.3	10.0	V	Around two dozen houses were damaged, and six people suffered injuries.	-	6
19	Southern East Pacific Rise	6.7	10.0	I	-	-	-
19	China, Yunnan, 24 km west of Dali	4.6	10.0	-	Foreshock of the 2021 Dali earthquake. At least 1,301 homes were damaged, and over 8,000 people were evacuated.	-	-
21	China, Yunnan, 25 km northwest of Dali	6.1	9.0	IX	Further information: 2021 Dali earthquake	3	32
21	China, Qinghai, 388 km southwest of Xining	7.3	10.0	X	Further information: 2021 Maduo earthquake	0-20	19-300
21	France, Wallis and Futuna offshore, 253 km south southeast of Alo	6.5	10.0	VII	-	-	-
21	Indonesia, East Java, 29 km south southwest of Sumberpucung	5.7	107.9	IV	More than 600 buildings were damaged in East Java, including 14 public health clinics and seven Mosques. Three people were injured.	-	3
23	Democratic Republic of the Congo, Nord-Kivu, 2 km northeast of Goma	4.5	10.0	IV	Two houses collapsed and many others were damaged in Rubavu, Rwanda.	-	-
24	Democratic Republic of the Congo, Nord-Kivu, 9 km north of Goma	4.7	10.0	-	Several buildings collapsed in Goma. One person was killed in Rubavu, Rwanda.	1	-
25	Rwanda, Northern Province, 19 km west southwest of Musanze District	4.7	10.0	VIII	At least 267 houses collapsed while 859 buildings, including several schools, as well as several roads were damaged in the Rubavu District of Rwanda. In neighboring Goma, Democratic Republic of the Congo, the earthquake flattened several buildings and ten people, including three children were injured by falling debris.	-	10
31	United States, Alaska, 73 km north of Chickaloon	6.1	43.9	VI	Minor damage was reported in Greater Anchorage, such as objects falling off shelves.	-	-

=== June ===
June
- Strongest: 6.5 M_{w} New Zealand
- Deadliest: 5.0 M_{w} Democratic Republic of the Congo; 2 deaths
- Total fatalities: 3

Number by magnitude
- 9.0+: 0
- 8.0–8.9: 0
- 7.0–7.9: 0
- 6.0–6.9: 2
- 5.0–5.9: 104
- 4.0–4.9: 1,092

Date	Country and location	M_{w}	Depth (km)	MMI	Notes	Casualties	
Date	Country and location	M_{w}	Depth (km)	MMI	Notes	Dead	Injured
1	Argentina, San Juan, 23 km northwest of San Agustín de Valle Fértil	4.8	44.8	V	Several buildings were damaged in Valle Fértil.	-	-
3	Indonesia offshore, Molucca Sea, 132 km west southwest of Ternate	6.2	26.0	IV	-	-	-
7	Philippines, Western Visayas, 18 km west southwest of Jayubó	4.7	10.0	VI	Various houses sustained major damage in Valderrama, Antique due to massive cracks and fissures that formed during the event and aftershocks.	-	-
10	Democratic Republic of Congo, South Kivu, 87 km southwest of Kabare	5.0	10.0	V	Various old houses collapsed in Bukavu district, trapping some people under the rubble. Two children were killed by a falling wall, and three prisoners were injured.	2	3
10	China, Yunnan, 23 km southwest of Longquan	5.0	10.0	VII	Two people were injured and more than 2,000 houses were damaged.	-	2
12	China, Yunnan, 68 km southeast of Myitkyina, Myanmar	4.9	10.0	-	At least 413 buildings were damaged, seven of them collapsed.	-	-
14	Philippines Northern Mindanao, 5 km northwest of Don Carlos	5.7	5.9	VII	At least 29 homes destroyed and 1,156 others damaged in the Don Carlos-Kalilangan-Pangantucan area.	-	-
16	Indonesia, Maluku offshore, 71 km east southeast of Amahai	5.9	7.0	VI	Homes in three villages were damaged by the earthquake. A 50 cm (1.6 ft) high tsunami added to the damage. The tsunami was determined to have been triggered by an underwater landslide.	-	-
16	China, Qinghai	5.5	10.0	VII	Four homes sustained cracks in walls.	-	-
20	New Zealand, Kermadec Islands offshore	6.5	25.0	IV	Aftershock of the 8.1 quake on March 4.	-	-
23	Peru, Cañete offshore, 11 km west southwest of Mala	5.9	50.1	VII	Further information: 2021 Mala earthquake	1	20
23	Argentina, Mendoza, 26 km west northwest of Mendoza	4.6	19.0	IV	Some houses were damaged and one collapsed in Las Heras, roads were also cut by rockslides.	-	-
24	Afghanistan, Parwan, 10 km southwest of Charikar	5.1	16.2	V	22 people were injured when fleeing in panic.	-	22
26	France, Grand Est, 2 km southeast of Hœrdt	4.1	2.5	IV	Cracks were reported in walls and roof tiles were damaged.	-	-
26	Turkey, Bingöl, 8 km east of Yayladere	5.4	3.1	VI	Several houses in four villages were damaged in Elazığ, and an elderly woman was injured.	-	1
27	Indonesia, Yogyakarta offshore, 55 km southeast of Pundong	5.1	85.5	V	Several homes were damaged in Gunungkidul.	-	-

=== July ===
July
- Strongest: 8.2 M_{w} United States
- Deadliest: 5.7 M_{w} Tajikistan; 5 deaths
- Total fatalities: 7

Number by magnitude
- 9.0+: 0
- 8.0–8.9: 1
- 7.0–7.9: 0
- 6.0–6.9: 11
- 5.0–5.9: 134
- 4.0–4.9: 1,151

Date	Country and location	M_{w}	Depth (km)	MMI	Notes	Casualties	
Date	Country and location	M_{w}	Depth (km)	MMI	Notes	Dead	Injured
2	Fiji region	6.1	599.6	II	-	-	-
4	Chile, Atacama offshore, 89 km west of Vallenar	6.0	22.0	VI	-	-	-
7	Laos, Sainyabuli, 53 km northeast of Chiang Klang, Thailand	4.7	10.0	IV	In Nan province, Thailand, a local school suffered cracks on one of its supporting beams.	-	-
8	United States, California, 32 km south southwest of Smith Valley	6.0	7.5	VII	The earthquake triggered rockslides in California and Nevada. It is the largest earthquake to strike California since the 2019 Ridgecrest earthquake two years prior.	-	-
10	Indonesia offshore, Molucca Sea, 215 km northwest of Tobelo	6.1	43.6	IV	-	-	-
10	Tajikistan, Districts under Central Government Jurisdiction, 18 km east southeast of Rasht	5.7	12.8	VII	Further information: 2021 Rasht earthquake	5	30
17	Panama, Chiriquí offshore, 130 km south of Punta de Burica	6.1	9.1	IV	Foreshock of the 6.7 earthquake on July 21.	-	-
18	Iran, Bushehr, 49 km north of Borazjan	5.4	9.0	VII	Some damage in towns near the epicentre, such as Kazerun.	-	-
21	Papua New Guinea offshore, Bismarck Sea, 150 km southwest of Lorengau	6.0	8.7	IV	-	-	-
21	Peru, Cajamarca, 7 km south southeast of San Ignacio	4.9	31.9	VI	16 buildings were destroyed and 45 others were damaged in the districts of San Ignacio and Tabaconas. A 12-year-old girl was injured and 50 people were left homeless.	-	1
21	Panama, Chiriquí offshore, 68 km south of Punta de Burica	6.7	10.0	VI	Power was cut in Puerto Armuelles, and at least one house was damaged. Three houses were also damaged in neighboring Costa Rica.	-	-
23	Philippines, Calabarzon offshore, 17 km south of Calatagan	6.7	110.0	V	Two people injured, three homes collapsed and 61 others damaged. A landslide occurred near Calatagan and some items were knocked off shelves in convenience stores. A sinkhole appeared beside a house in a barangay in Taal after the earthquake.	-	2
24	New Zealand, Kermadec Islands offshore	6.1	10.0	III	Aftershock of the M8.1 quake on March 4.	-	-
26	Indonesia, Central Sulawesi offshore, 97 km west northwest of Luwuk	6.3	11.0	VI	Power outages were caused and many residents evacuated due to fear of a potential tsunami. An elderly man died of shock and another died after a motorbike accident during the earthquake. Two homes were seriously damaged while in another five, damage was moderate. Damage was also reported in one school and three worship locations.	2	-
29	United States, Alaska offshore, Aleutian Islands, 105 km southeast of Perryville	8.2	35.0	VII	Further information: 2021 Chignik earthquake	-	-
29	Myanmar, Sagaing, 46 km northeast of Shwebo	5.5	10.0	VII	A brick wall collapsed in Yae Oo town of the Sagaing Division. In the Chanayethazan Township of Mandalay, a monastery partially collapsed.	-	-
30	Peru, Piura, 9 km east southeast of Sullana	6.2	34.4	VII	Moderate damage was reported near the epicenter, where various old houses were damaged, as well as Piura Cathedral. A total of 721 residents suffered injuries. Two adults and a child had serious injuries after falling from height.	-	721

=== August ===
August
- Strongest: 8.1 M_{w} South Sandwich Islands
- Deadliest: 7.2 M_{w} (Haiti) Haiti; 2,248 deaths
- Total fatalities: 2,250

Number by magnitude
- 9.0+: 0
- 8.0–8.9: 1
- 7.0–7.9: 5
- 6.0–6.9: 14
- 5.0–5.9: 316
- 4.0–4.9: 1,887

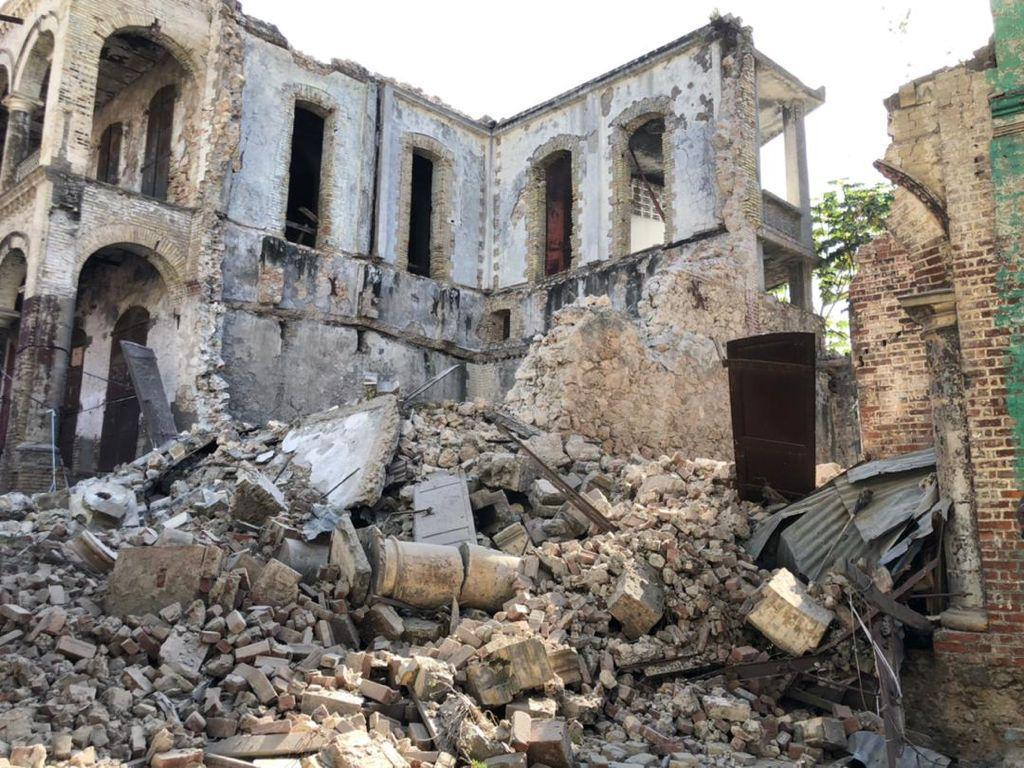
A destroyed building in Les Cayes, Haiti.

Date	Country and location	M_{w}	Depth (km)	MMI	Notes	Casualties	
Date	Country and location	M_{w}	Depth (km)	MMI	Notes	Dead	Injured
2	Indonesia, West Papua offshore, 182 km northeast of Tual	6.0	10.0	IV	-	-	-
3	India, Andaman and Nicobar Islands offshore, 339 km south southeast of Port Blair	6.1	10.0	IV	-	-	-
4	China, Guangxi, 58 km southeast of Baise City	4.5	13.8	-	Over 500 houses and some roads were damaged in Debao County. Electricity was also disrupted.	-	-
11	Indonesia, North Sumatra, 11 km southeast of Padangsidempuan	4.8	10.0	II	Two buildings were damaged in the North Padang Lawas Regency.	-	-
11	Philippines, Davao offshore, 60 km east northeast of Pondaguitan	7.1	55.1	VII	Further information: 2021 Davao Oriental earthquake	1	-
12	South Georgia and the South Sandwich Islands offshore, South Sandwich Islands region	7.5	47.2	VI	Further information: 2021 South Sandwich Islands earthquakes	-	-
12	South Georgia and the South Sandwich Islands offshore, South Sandwich Islands region	8.1	22.8	VII	Further information: 2021 South Sandwich Islands earthquakes	-	-
12	South Georgia and the South Sandwich Islands offshore, South Sandwich Islands region	7.4	35.0	-	Aftershocks of the 8.1 earthquake an hour earlier.	-	-
12	South Georgia and the South Sandwich Islands offshore, South Sandwich Islands region	6.1	35.0	IV	Aftershocks of the 8.1 earthquake an hour earlier.	-	-
12	South Georgia and the South Sandwich Islands offshore, South Sandwich Islands region	6.0	35.0	IV	Aftershocks of the 8.1 earthquake an hour earlier.	-	-
12	Russia, Kemerovo Oblast, 34 km northeast of Karagayla	5.0	10.0	V	Some buildings were damaged in Novokuznetsk.	-	-
12	Spain, Andalusia, 2 km west of Santa Fe	4.6	10.0	VII	The strongest earthquake to hit the region since 1984. One house partially collapsed, and cracks in walls appeared in some others.	-	-
13	South Georgia and the South Sandwich Islands offshore, South Sandwich Islands region	6.1	10.0	IV	Aftershock of the 8.1 earthquake 16 hours earlier.	-	-
14	United States, Alaska offshore, Aleutian Islands, 117 km southeast of Perryville	6.9	21.0	V	Aftershock of the 8.2 earthquake on July 29.	-	-
14	Haiti, Nippes	7.2	10.0	VIII	Further information: 2021 Haiti earthquake	2,248	12,763
16	South Georgia and the South Sandwich Islands offshore, South Sandwich Islands region	6.9	14.0	IV	Aftershocks of the 8.1 earthquake on August 12.	-	-
17	South Georgia and the South Sandwich Islands offshore, South Sandwich Islands region	6.1	47.1	IV	Aftershocks of the 8.1 earthquake on August 12.	-	-
18	Vanuatu, Sanma offshore, 17 km north of Port Olry	6.9	93.0	VII	-	-	-
18	South Georgia and the South Sandwich Islands offshore, South Sandwich Islands region	6.0	28.0	IV	Aftershocks of the 8.1 earthquake on August 12.	-	-
22	South Georgia and the South Sandwich Islands offshore, South Sandwich Islands region	6.6	11.0	IV	Aftershocks of the 8.1 earthquake on August 12.	-	-
22	South Georgia and the South Sandwich Islands offshore, South Sandwich Islands region	7.1	14.0	IV	Aftershocks of the 8.1 earthquake on August 12.	-	-
24	Russia, Kuril Islands offshore, 223 km southwest of Severo-Kurilsk	6.0	31.0	IV	-	-	-
24	Honduras, Santa Bárbara, 11 km north northeast of Pinalejo	5.2	7.8	VI	Several buildings, including a school and a hospital, were damaged in Santa Rita and San Pedro Sula.	-	-
26	Indonesia, Central Sulawesi offshore, 106 km northeast of Poso	5.7	8.0	VII	A collapsing house crushed one person to death, while 39 people suffered injuries. At least 297 houses suffered damage.	1	39
31	Tanzania, Shinyanga, 33 km northeast of Masumbwe	4.8	10.0	V	Cracks were observed in walls of some houses, and one person suffered injuries.	-	1
31	New Zealand, Kermadec Islands offshore, 989 km south southwest of 'Ohonua, Tonga	6.4	16.0	IV	Aftershock of the 8.1 quake on March 4.	-	-
31	Turkey, Kütahya, 19 km west of İhsaniye	5.1	10.0	V	Fifteen homes collapsed in Altıntaş. Bricks were dislodged and fell from a balcony and chimneys. The earthquake destroyed a barn and caused solar panels on a roof to explode.	-	-

=== September ===
September
- Strongest: 7.0 M_{w} Mexico
- Deadliest: 7.0 M_{w} Mexico; 13 deaths
- Total fatalities: 17

Number by magnitude
- 9.0+: 0
- 8.0–8.9: 0
- 7.0–7.9: 1
- 6.0–6.9: 8
- 5.0–5.9: 133
- 4.0–4.9: 1,183

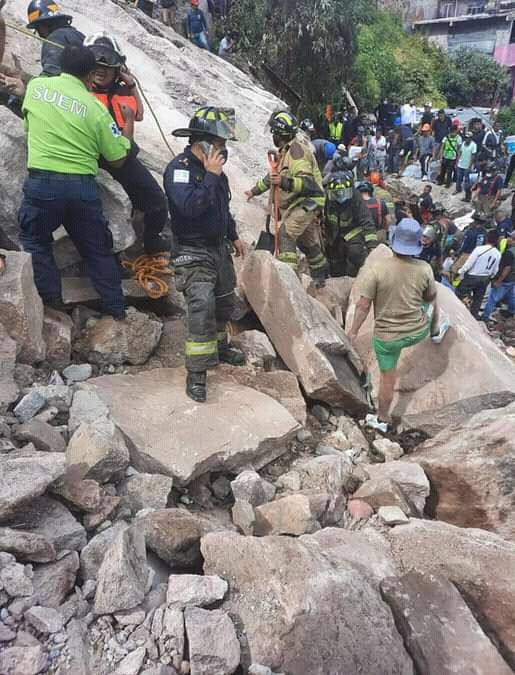
Rescue workers searching the rubble of a collapsed building in Cerro del Chiquihuite, Mexico.

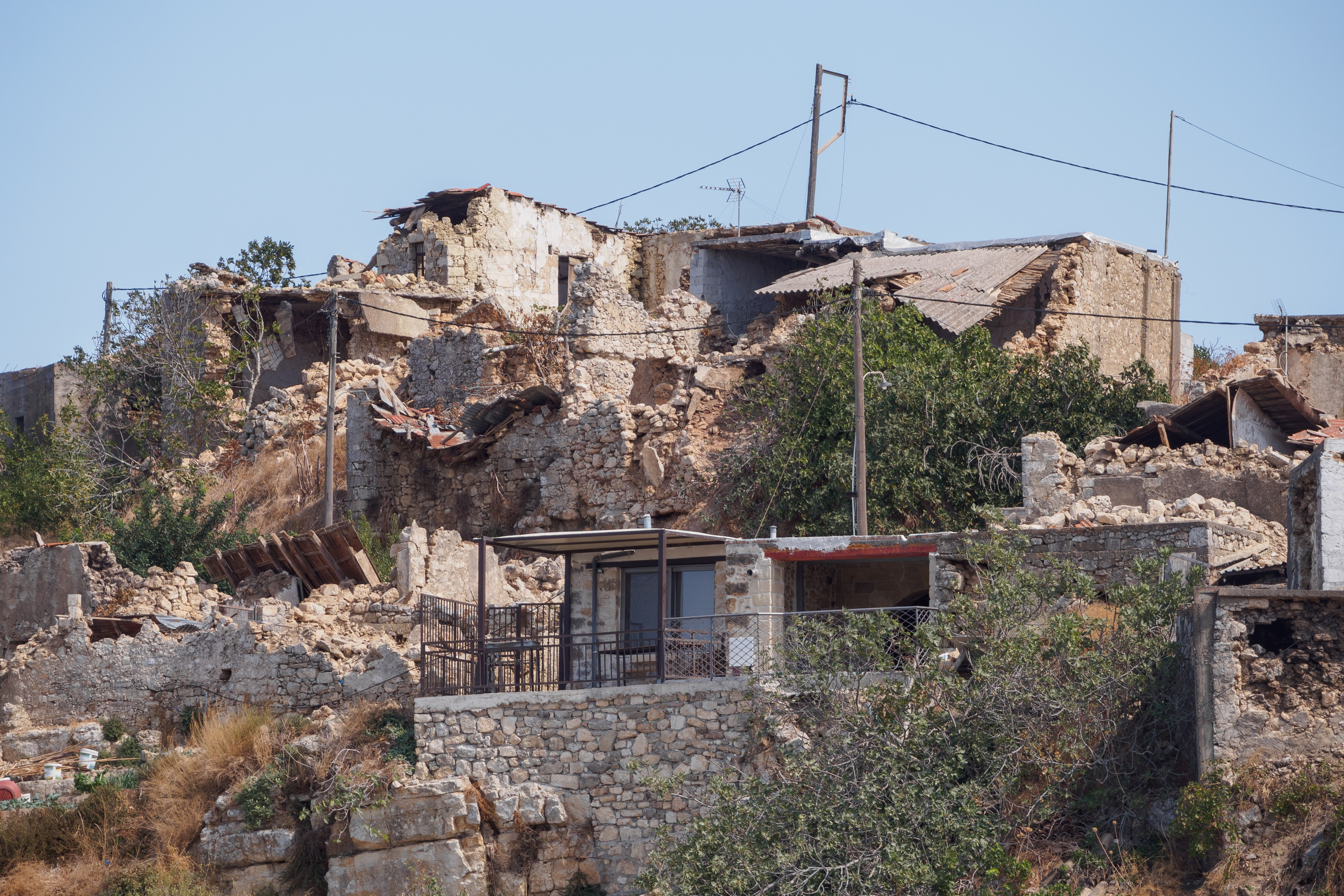
Damage to buildings in Crete, Greece during the 2021 Arkalochori earthquake.

Date	Country and location	M_{w}	Depth (km)	MMI	Notes	Casualties	
Date	Country and location	M_{w}	Depth (km)	MMI	Notes	Dead	Injured
7	Tonga, Haʻapai offshore, 185 km west northwest of Pangai	6.0	10.0	IV	-	-	-
8	Mexico, Guerrero, Acapulco	7.0	20.0	VIII	Further information: 2021 Guerrero earthquake	13	23
13	Iran, Razavi Khorasan, 38 km east northeast of Quchan	5.1	10.0	V	At least 623 houses collapsed and 226 others were damaged in 42 villages around the epicenter. At least 23 people were injured during the quake.	-	23
13	Argentina, Salta, 79 km northwest of San Antonio de los Cobres	6.2	193.4	IV	-	-	-
13	Indonesia, North Maluku, 153 km south of Sofifi	4.6	10.0	-	One house was severely damaged in Bancan.	-	-
15	China, Sichuan, 52 km southeast of Neijiang	5.4	7.1	VII	Further information: 2021 Luxian earthquake	3	146
18	Papua New Guinea, Oro, 117 km south southeast of Popondetta	5.3	20.3	VI	The quake caused flooding which destroyed some food gardens and a bridge.	-	-
19	Peru, Arequipa, 5 km southeast of Huambo	4.6	10.0	IV	Six homes were damaged in Maca District.	-	-
19	Iran, Isfahan, 41 km northwest of Yasuj	4.3	10.0	II	Aftershock of the 2021 Sisakht earthquake. Some buildings were damaged in Yasuj.	-	-
20	Russia, Kuril Islands offshore	6.1	25.0	IV	-	-	-
21	Chile, Biobío offshore, 81 km northwest of Arauco	6.4	12.5	V	-	-	-
21	Australia, Victoria, 39 km south of Mount Buller	5.9	12.0	VII	Further information: 2021 Mansfield earthquake	-	1
22	Nicaragua, Chinandega offshore, 78 km southwest of Jiquilillo	6.5	30.7	V	-	-	-
24	United States, Alaska offshore, Aleutian Islands, 187 km west southwest of Adak	6.1	39.6	V	-	-	-
27	Greece, Crete, 6 km north of Thrapsanón	6.0	6.0	VII	Further information: 2021 Arkalochori earthquake	1	35
28	Indonesia, Central Java, 9 km north northwest of Bumiayu	3.0	10.0	-	At least 23 houses in 2 districts of Brebes Regency were damaged, 4 of them seriously. A hill suffered a 150-meter-long crack.	-	-
28	Greece, Crete, 9 km southwest of Arkalochóri	5.3	10.0	V	Aftershock of the 6.0 earthquake a day earlier. Some homes collapsed.	-	-
29	Argentina, Mendoza, 32 km east southeast of San Martín	4.9	30.0	VI	Some houses were damaged or destroyed in Rivadavia.	-	-
29	Japan, Niigata offshore, 241 km northwest of Nanao	6.1	367.7	III	-	-	-
29	Philippines, Soccksargen, 20 km southeast of Lake Sebu	4.0	5.0	-	Several houses, schools, and other buildings were damaged in T'Boli. At least four hot springs also appeared after the earthquake.	-	-

=== October ===
October
- Strongest: 7.3 M_{w} Vanuatu
- Deadliest: 5.9 M_{w} Pakistan; 42 deaths
- Total fatalities: 46

Number by magnitude
- 9.0+: 0
- 8.0–8.9: 0
- 7.0–7.9: 1
- 6.0–6.9: 10
- 5.0–5.9: 102
- 4.0–4.9: 1,035

Date	Country and location	M_{w}	Depth (km)	MMI	Notes	Casualties	
Date	Country and location	M_{w}	Depth (km)	MMI	Notes	Dead	Injured
1	Iran, Bushehr, 24 km north of Genāveh	4.9	10.0	VI	Three people were injured.	-	3
2	Vanuatu region offshore	7.3	535.8	IV	-	-	-
2	Mid-Indian Ridge	6.0	10.0	-	-	-	-
2	Philippines, Mimaropa, 11 km northeast of Tuban	5.4	8.7	VII	The walls of five homes collapsed, with damage totaling ₱208,000.	-	-
4	Iran, Khuzestan, 61 km northeast of Masjed Soleymān	5.5	13.0	VI	At least eight people were injured and over 3,000 buildings were damaged in Kuhrang County.	-	8
4	South Georgia and the South Sandwich Islands offshore, South Sandwich Islands region	6.2	10.0	IV	Aftershock of the 8.1 earthquake on August 12.	-	-
5	Japan, Iwate offshore, 48 km north northeast of Miyako	5.7	55.0	V	Three people had minor injuries and at least one building was damaged.	-	3
6	Croatia, Split-Dalmatia County, 10 km east of Otok	4.9	10.0	VI	Some buildings were damaged in Split, and a landslide was reported in Trilj.	-	-
6	Pakistan, Balochistan, 11 km north northeast of Harnai	5.9	9.0	VII	Further information: 2021 Balochistan earthquake	42	300
6	Argentina, Salta, 21 km northeast of El Galpón	5.0	10.0	IV	Some damage in supermarkets, and two people were hospitalized.	-	2
7	Japan, Chiba, 5 km southwest of Chiba	5.9	62.0	VII	Further information: 2021 Chiba earthquake	-	51
8	Iran, Khuzestan, 59 km northeast of Masjed Soleymān	5.1	10.0	IV	Three people were injured when fleeing in panic.	-	3
9	Peru, Arequipa, 4 km northwest of Madrigal	5.7	14.2	VI	More than 140 houses were damaged, seven of them seriously.	-	-
9	Vanuatu region offshore	6.9	520.4	III	Aftershock of the 7.3 earthquake on October 2.	-	-
10	Pakistan, Balochistan, 6 km south of Harnai	4.5	10.0	III	Aftershock of the 2021 Balochistan earthquake. Six people were injured and there was additional damage.	-	6
10	United States, Hawaii offshore, 27 km south southwest of Naalehu	6.2	35.1	VII	This was the strongest earthquake in the US state since the 2018 Hawaii earthquake. In Naalehu, objects fell off shelves and cracks appeared in drywalls. Rockfalls were also reported in the Halemaʻumaʻu Crater.	-	-
11	United States, Alaska offshore, 112 km east of Chignik	6.9	51.6	VI	Aftershock of the 8.2 earthquake on July 29.	-	-
11	India, Karnataka, 7 km northeast of Shahabad	4.3	10.0	IV	Thirty houses collapsed and ten others were damaged in Kalaburagi.	-	-
12	Greece, Crete, 4 km southwest of Palekastro	6.4	20.0	VIII	Further information: 2021 Lasithi earthquake	-	-
13	Argentina, Santa Cruz, 2 km northeast of El Calafate	5.4	10.0	VII	Cracks in walls and roads at El Calafate city. Rockslides were also reported.	-	-
14	China, Inner Mongolia, 180 km west northwest of Tongliao	4.4	10.0	-	At least 958 buildings were damaged in Ar Horqin Banner. At least 1,000 people were affected.	-	-
15	Solomon Islands, Isabel offshore, 146 km west southwest of Buala	6.4	22.6	VI	Two houses were destroyed and 23 others were damaged in Gatokae Island. One person was injured after the canteen of a school collapsed.	-	1
15	Indonesia, Bali, 18 km north northeast of Banjar Wangsian	4.7	10.0	VIII	Further information: 2021 Bali earthquake	4	73
16	Iran, Kerman, 16 km south of Shahrak-e Pābedānā	4.8	10.0	-	At least 3,530 buildings were damaged. There were reports of collapsed walls and broken windows in Bob-Tangol and in Taleghani.	-	-
18	Vanuatu, Torba offshore, 67 km west northwest of Sola	6.2	96.5	V	-	-	-
21	Tonga offshore, south of the Fiji Islands	6.1	497.2	II	-	-	-
22	Indonesia, East Java offshore, 53 km southwest of Dampit	4.9	72.9	IV	Several buildings were damaged in Blitar. The earthquake also destroyed a local mosque.	-	-
22	Indonesia, Central Java, 15 km west of Salatiga	2.9	10.0	-	It is the largest earthquake in a swarm related to Mount Telomoyo. Several buildings were damaged.	-	-
24	Taiwan, Yilan, 21 km south southeast of Yilan	6.2	64.5	VI	A woman in Hualien County was injured by falling rocks. The Taipei Metro was temporarily suspended.	-	1
29	Albania, Dibër, 9 km northeast of Bulqizë	4.7	10.0	VI	At least 16 homes were damaged.	-	-

=== November ===
November
- Strongest: 7.5 M_{w} Peru
- Deadliest: 7.5 M_{w} Peru; 12 deaths
- Total fatalities: 14

Number by magnitude
- 9.0+: 0
- 8.0–8.9: 0
- 7.0–7.9: 1
- 6.0–6.9: 17
- 5.0–5.9: 116
- 4.0–4.9: 1,084

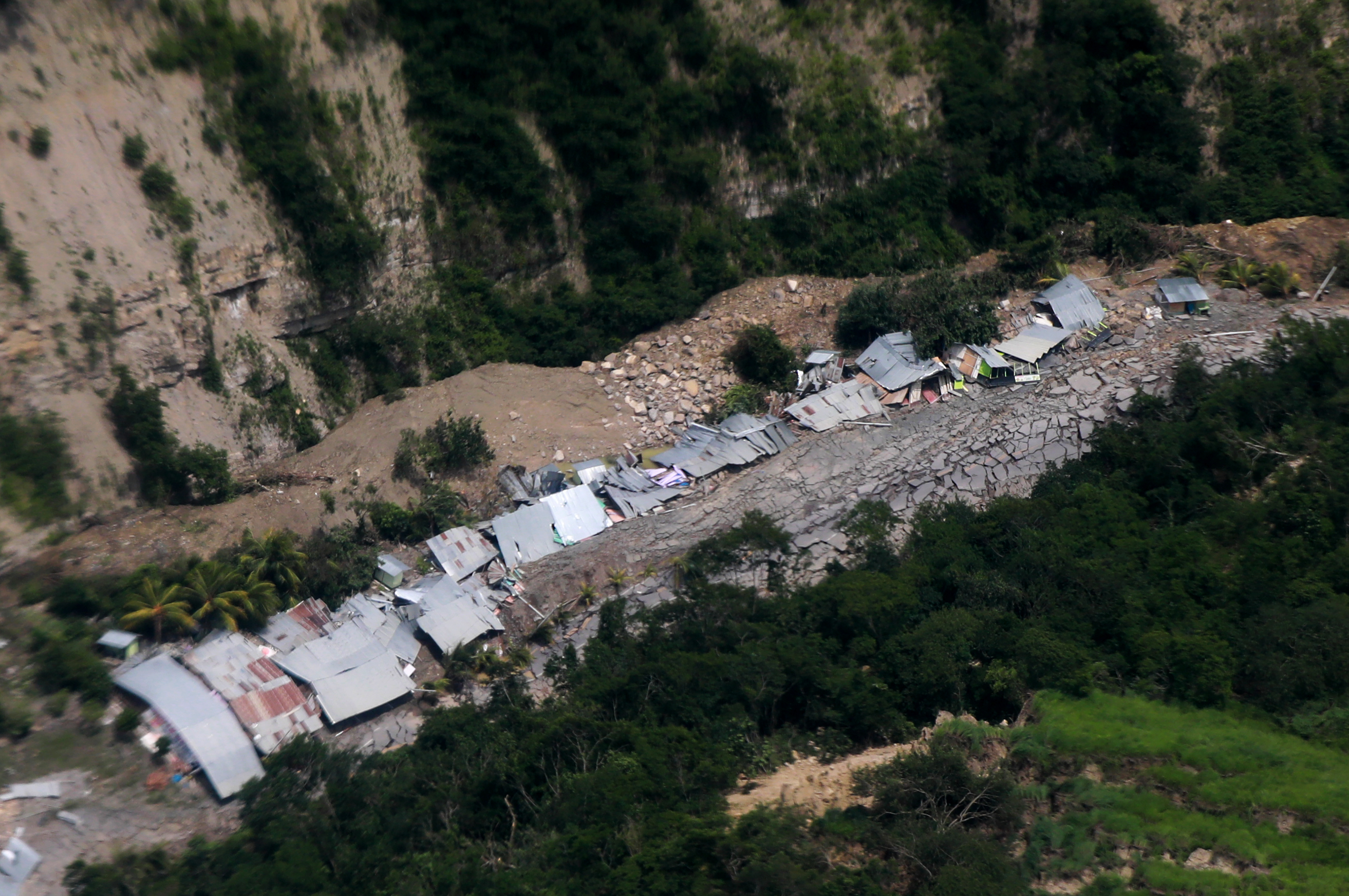
The destruction of the earthquake in Peru

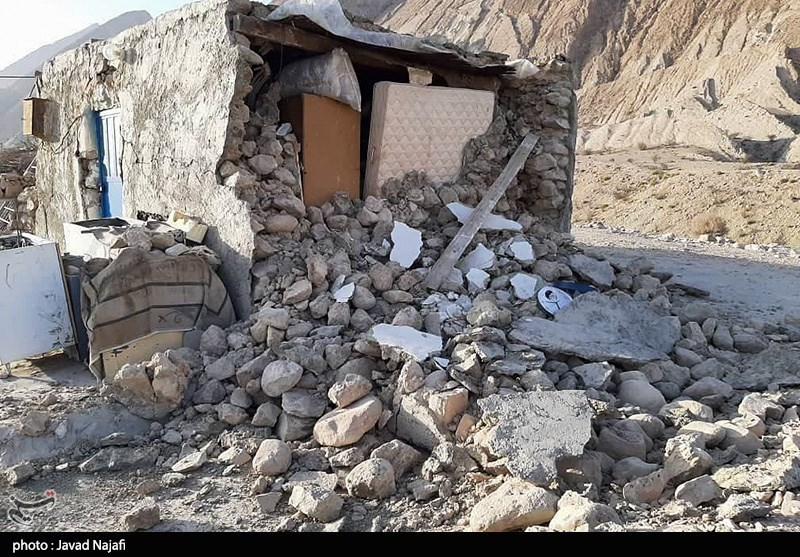
Damage to a building in Iran by the earthquake.

Date	Country and location	M_{w}	Depth (km)	MMI	Notes	Casualties	
Date	Country and location	M_{w}	Depth (km)	MMI	Notes	Dead	Injured
1	South Georgia and the South Sandwich Islands offshore, South Sandwich Islands region	6.0	22.0	IV	Aftershock of the 8.1 earthquake on August 12.	-	-
1	Indonesia, North Sumatra offshore, 255 km south of Sinabang	6.0	15.3	IV	-	-	-
4	Indonesia, Maluku, 65 km northeast of Amahai	5.7	18.0	VI	At least 26 homes in the Central Maluku Regency were damaged.	-	-
4	Pakistan, Sind, 22 km southeast of Jati	4.9	10.0	III	Cracks appeared in some buildings in Lakhpat, in neighboring India.	-	-
6	Indonesia, North Sulawesi offshore, 154 km of Gorontalo	6.0	39.9	V	-	-	-
8	Turkey, Konya, 22 km southeast of Derbent	5.1	10.0	V	Three buildings were destroyed and 151 were damaged in Kızılören, Küçükmuhsine Sefaköy and Tepekent. Two people were injured after falling from stairs.	-	2
9	Nicaragua, Carazo offshore, 61 km south of Masachapa	6.3	35.0	V	-	-	-
10	Japan, Ryukyu Islands offshore, 184 km southeast of Hirara	6.6	10.0	IV	-	-	-
10	Indonesia, Papua offshore, 182 km southwest of Nabire	6.0	10.0	V	-	-	-
14	Iran, Hormozgan, 62 km north northwest of Bandar Abbas	6.0	9.0	VII	Further information: 2021 Hormozgan earthquakes	2	98
14	Iran, Hormozgan, 62 km north northwest of Bandar Abbas	6.4	10.0	IX	Further information: 2021 Hormozgan earthquakes	2	98
15	South Indian Ocean	6.0	10.0	-	-	-	-
18	Papua New Guinea, New Ireland offshore, 189 km southeast of Kokopo	6.2	36.3	IV	-	-	-
19	Turkey, Erzurum, 23 km northwest of Karayazı	5.1	6.2	VII	At least 55 houses and 35 barns collapsed in several villages near the epicentre. Two people were injured.	-	2
20	Azerbaijan, Shirvan, 12 km northeast of Shamakhi	5.0	10.0	VI	A house was damaged in Agsu.	-	-
25	Solomon Islands, Santa Cruz Islands offshore, 77 km east of Lata	6.1	10.0	VII	-	-	-
26	Myanmar, Chin, 20 km west southwest of Falam	6.2	43.0	VIII	In Hakha, Myanmar, the ceiling of a church partially collapsed. In Bangladesh, one person was injured after jumping off the second floor of a building at Chittagong University, and a four-storey apartment tilted to its side and struck a neighbouring building in Chawkbazar Thana.	-	1
28	Peru, Loreto, 43 km north northwest of Barranca	7.5	126.0	VIII	Further information: 2021 Northern Peru earthquake	12	136
29	Japan, Izu Islands offshore, 484 km southeast of Katsuura	6.3	6.1	III	-	-	-
30	Papua New Guinea, New Ireland offshore, 112 km southeast of Kavieng	6.3	10.0	V	-	-	-
30	Papua New Guinea, New Ireland offshore, 113 km northwest of Rabaul	6.1	10.0	IV	Aftershock of the 6.3 earthquake a minute earlier.	-	-

=== December ===
December
- Strongest: 7.3 M_{w} Indonesia; Two events
- Deadliest: 7.3 M_{w} Indonesia; 1 death
- Total fatalities: 1

Number by magnitude
- 9.0+: 0
- 8.0–8.9: 0
- 7.0–7.9: 2
- 6.0–6.9: 12
- 5.0–5.9: 153
- 4.0–4.9: 928

Date	Country and location	M_{w}	Depth (km)	MMI	Notes	Casualties	
Date	Country and location	M_{w}	Depth (km)	MMI	Notes	Dead	Injured
3	Japan, Kansai, 9 km southwest of Gobō	5.2	11.3	VI	Two homes suffered minor damage and broken windows were reported in Wakayama. Five people were injured.	-	5
3	Chile, Easter Island offshore, 295 km west southwest of Hanga Roa	6.1	10.0	III	-	-	-
3	South Georgia and the South Sandwich Islands offshore, South Sandwich Islands region	6.0	9.9	III	Aftershock of the 8.1 earthquake on August 12.	-	-
4	Indonesia offshore, Philippine Sea, 259 km north of Tobelo	6.0	174.3	IV	-	-	-
5	Peru, Lambayeque, 14 km west northwest of Mochumi	4.1	60.0	-	One house collapsed and nine others were damaged in the Incahuasi District. Two people were left homeless.	-	-
5	Turkey, Van, 18 km southeast of Ercis	4.9	19.4	VII	Several buildings cracked in Van.	-	-
6	China, Qinghai, 297 km southwest of Xining	4.8	10.0	VI	At least 415 houses were damaged in Gadê County.	-	-
9	Japan, Kagoshima offshore, 119 km north northeast of Naze	6.0	7.0	V	-	-	-
9	Poland, Lower Silesia, 6 km east southeast of Polkowice	4.0	5.0	IV	Five miners were injured in the Lubin mine.	-	5
11	Chile, Coquimbo, 39 km north of La Serena	5.7	53.3	V	Some rockfalls were reported in the region, causing some road damage.	-	-
11	Indonesia, Barat Daya Islands offshore, 248 km northeast of Lospalos, Timor Leste	5.4	13.0	VI	Foreshock of the 7.3 earthquake on December 29. Sixteen buildings were damaged and thirteen were destroyed in Damar Island.	-	-
12	Australia offshore, west of Macquarie Island	6.6	10.0	-	-	-	-
14	Indonesia offshore, Flores Sea, 112 km north of Maumere	7.3	18.4	VI	Further information: 2021 Flores earthquake	1	173
15	Indonesia, East Java offshore, 36 km southeast of Kencong	4.8	10.0	VI	Six people injured, one home collapsed, and 45 others damaged in Jember Regency.	-	6
16	Indonesia, Barat Daya Islands offshore, 247 km northeast of Lospalos, Timor Leste	5.6	10.0	VI	Seven houses and a church were damaged in Damar Island.	-	-
16	South Georgia and the South Sandwich Islands offshore, South Sandwich Islands region	6.0	15.0	III	Aftershock of the 8.1 earthquake on August 12.	-	-
18	South Africa offshore, Prince Edward Islands region	6.0	10.0	-	-	-	-
19	Fiji, Bua offshore, 88 km west of Labasa	6.2	10.0	VI	-	-	-
19	Laos, Sainyabuli province, 53 km northwest of Sainyabuli	5.5	10.0	VII	In Thailand, the main Buddha image of the Phumin Temple in Mueang Nan District, was damaged. Many houses in the area were also affected.	-	-
20	Argentina, Salta, 40 km north of Burruyacú	5.0	10.0	IV	Several buildings were damaged in Rosario de la Frontera, including a school and a nursing home.	-	-
20	United States, California offshore, 7 km north of Petrolia	6.2	27.0	VII	Some minor damage was reported, such as cracks in roads and broken glass. The earthquake also triggered a number of small landslides, and brought down a factory roof.	-	-
21	Haiti, Grand'Anse, 9 km west southwest of Corail	4.4	12.5	V	Aftershock of the 2021 Haiti earthquake. Additional damage and 150 people were injured.	-	150
22	Mexico, Jalisco, offshore, 217 km southwest of La Cruz de Loreto	6.0	10.0	IV	-	-	-
23	Morocco, Tanger-Tetouan-Al Hoceima, 4 km west northwest of Imzouren	4.8	10.0	VI	Extensive damage was reported in Al Hoceïma, such as collapsed walls.	-	-
23	India, Andhra Pradesh	3.5	10.0	-	Around forty houses suffered cracks in Tamil Nadu.	-	-
24	Laos, Phongsaly Province, 88 km north northwest of Phongsali	5.7	9.5	VII	Some twenty houses were damaged in Laos. In Yunnan, China, the wall of a school collapsed and the ceiling of an office building fell. Ten people were injured.	-	10
26	Fiji, Lau offshore, 140 km east of Levuka	6.1	626.5	II	-	-	-
27	Pakistan, Gilgit-Baltistan, 60 km southeast of Gilgit	5.2	10.0	V	Nine people were injured and at least 450 homes were destroyed at the Roundu District of Skardu. Water and power services were also disrupted.	-	9
28	Algeria, Skikda, 15 km south southwest of Skikda	4.3	11.6	III	Various buildings suffered material damage in Skikda.	-	-
29	Indonesia, Maluku offshore, 125 km north northeast of Lospalos, Timor Leste	7.3	165.5	VII	Twelve homes were damaged and two collapsed in the Maluku Barat Daya Regency. Seven homes and irrigations damaged, and landslides occurred in Venilale, East Timor. Six houses damaged in Darwin, Australia.	-	-

== See also ==
- List of earthquakes 2021–2030
- Lists of 21st-century earthquakes
- Lists of earthquakes by year
- Lists of earthquakes
