= 2021 Hormozgan earthquakes =

Earthquakes in Iran

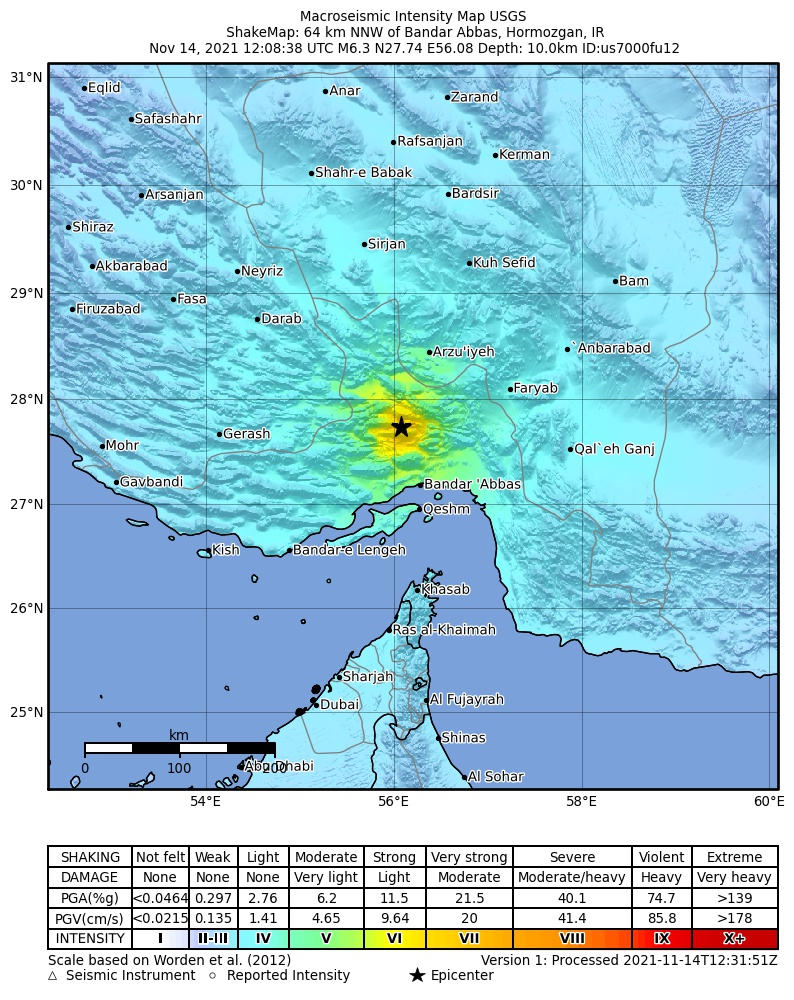

- Location within Iran
- UTC time: 2021-11-14 12:07:03; 2021-11-14 12:08:38
- ISC event: 621403058; 621403060
- USGS-ANSS: ComCat; ComCat
- Local date: November 14, 2021
- Local time: 15:37:03; 15:38:38
- Magnitude: 6.0 M_{wb} 6.4 M_{wb}
- Depth: 9 km (5.6 mi) 10 km (6.2 mi)
- Epicenter: 27.717°N 56.067°E
- Total damage: US$165 million
- Max. intensity: MMI IX (Violent)
- Peak acceleration: 0.58 g
- Landslides: Yes
- Casualties: 2 dead, 98 injured

The 2021 Hormozgan earthquakes was a doublet earthquake event in Iran that occurred on November 14, 2021, with magnitudes of 6.0 and 6.4 on the moment magnitude scale. The two quakes occurred just a minute and a half apart, killing 2 people and injuring a further 100.

== Tectonic setting ==
Bandar Abbas lies at the southern margin of the collision zone between the Eurasian plate and the Arabian plate. This collision has created the well known Zagros Mountains and the Iranian Plateau. The main fault system that runs through the Zagros Range is the Zagros fold and thrust belt, which has caused many destructive earthquakes in Iran over the years.

== Earthquakes ==
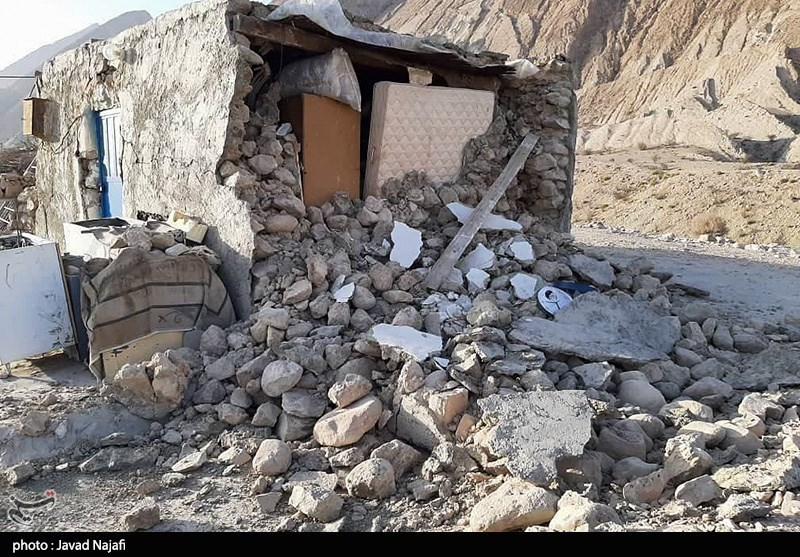
Damage to a building.

The first quake was initially measured at magnitude 6.1, but was later revised to 6.0 by the United States Geological Survey. A minute and a half later, the second quake happened. It was initially measured at magnitude 6.4 by the Iranian Seismological Center but was revised to 6.3 later. This event is considered a doublet earthquake because there were two earthquakes of similar size occurring in the same area a short time apart. The second earthquake had an intensity of IX (Violent) on the Modified Mercalli intensity scale. The quakes were felt as far away as Dubai as well, however not much damage was caused there due to the low intensity of shaking in the area.

== Impact ==
The earthquake triggered a landslide in the mountains of the Geno Biosphere Reserve in the Hormozgan province. Two people were killed; one by a falling utility pole, and the other died while running from his home. A total of 98 people were injured mostly due to widespread panic and some were injured from falling debris.

The total cost of damage is estimated at 700 trillion Iranian tomans ($US 165 million). In the city of Fin in Bandar Abbas County, roughly 2,125 structures were destroyed and 1,025 damaged. An official said that the worst damage was in the villages Gishan Gharbi, Ab Shirin and Rudshour.

== See also ==
- List of earthquakes in 2021
- List of earthquakes in Iran
- 2021 Sisakht earthquake − another Iranian earthquake that happened in the same year.
- 2022 Hormozgan earthquakes – another earthquake sequence in the same region.
