= Alvania bartschi =

Scientific classification
- Kingdom: Animalia
- Phylum: Mollusca
- Class: Gastropoda
- Subclass: Caenogastropoda
- Order: Littorinimorpha
- Family: Rissoidae
- Genus: Alvania
- Species: †A. bartschi

Binomial name
- †Alvania bartschi Olsson, 1942

Species of gastropod

Alvania bartschi is an extinct species of minute sea snail, a marine gastropod mollusc or micromollusk in the family Rissoidae.

== Description ==
The length of the shell attains 1.25 mm, its diameter is 0.8 mm.

== Distribution ==
Fossils of this species were found in late Pleistocene strata at Punta Piedra on the Burica Peninsula, Panama.
