= 2021 Khövsgöl earthquake =

Earthquake in Mongolia

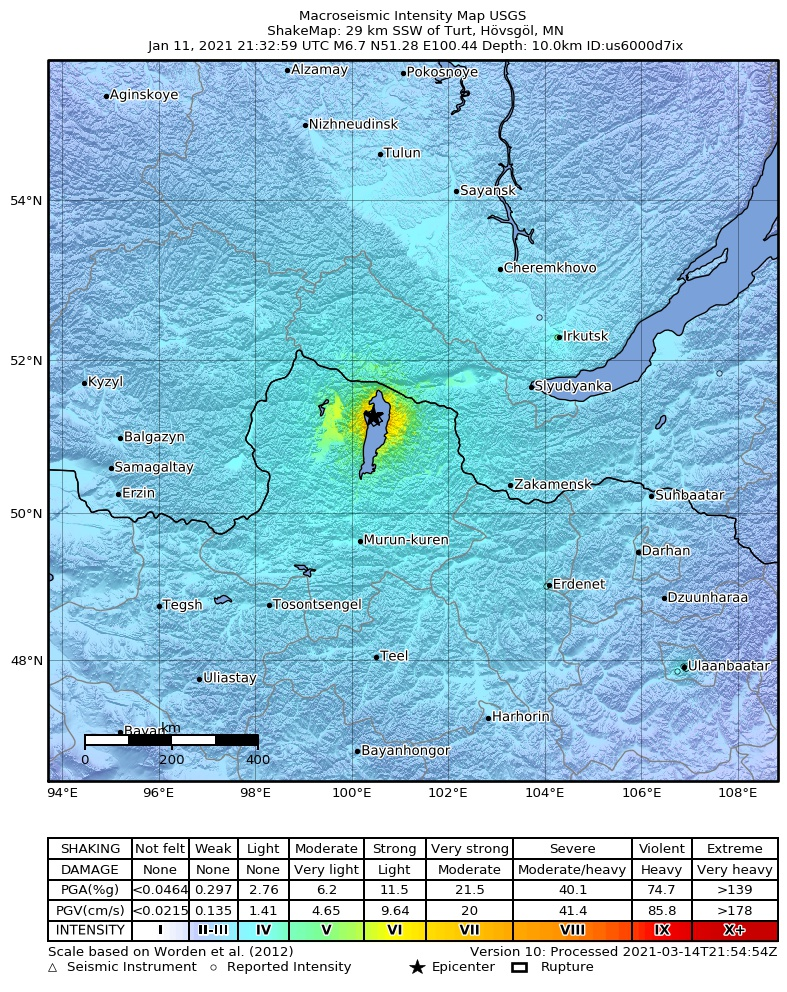

- Location within Mongolia
- UTC time: 2021-01-11 21:32:59
- ISC event: 619647426
- USGS-ANSS: ComCat
- Local date: January 12, 2021
- Local time: 05:32
- Magnitude: 6.7 M_{w} 6.9 M_{L}
- Depth: 10.0 km (6.2 mi)
- Epicenter: 51.281°N 100.438°E
- Areas affected: Mongolia; Russia
- Max. intensity: MMI IX (Violent)
- Casualties: 59 injured

The 2021 Khövsgöl earthquake was a magnitude 6.7 earthquake that occurred on January 12, 2021. It was located about 50 km south of the Russian border in the Khövsgöl Lake.

== Tectonic setting ==
Mongolia has complicated tectonic and structural geology, belonging to the Mongolian-Okhotsk Mobile Zone, between the Siberian Platform and Chinese Platform. The basement rocks formed during the Paleozoic in the Precambrian as Riphean age ophiolite formations experienced rifting from 1.7 to 1.6 billion years ago and again around 800 million years ago. The closing of a late Proterozoic ocean generated the ophiolites and the oldest basement rock. The Baikalides and Altaid mountain belts represent the accretion of island arcs into the Paleozoic. The collision of small microcontinents like Amuria and the large collision between Asia and Gondwana in the Mesozoic and Cenozoic had a major impact on the region. Crustal extension created the Mongolian Plateau, while rifting, crustal thinning, block faulting and basalt eruptions produced terrain very similar to the Basin and Range province in the western United States. One of the strongest earthquakes in Mongolia was the 1957 Bayanhongor earthquake, which measured M_{w} 8.1 and caused 30 fatalities.

== Earthquake ==
The earthquake was the largest in Mongolia since a 7.0 event in 1967. It was initially reported as 6.8 M_{w}, before being downgraded to 6.7. It was located about 50 km from the Mongolian town of Turt, and 55 km from the Russian border. According to PAGER, 17,000 people felt moderate to strong shaking. It was felt as far away as Irkutsk and Cheremkhovo in Russia.

It was assigned a maximum Modified Mercalli intensity of IX (Violent). It was felt as far as eastern and western Siberia. The earthquake occurred due to shallow oblique-normal faulting beneath the lake along the Khuvsgul Fault. It is the largest recorded earthquake on the fault, which has the potential to generate 7.0–7.5 earthquakes. Rupture occurred on the 45°, east-dipping fault, and propagated at a speed of 2 km/s. The estimated rupture area was 40 × 20 km^{2}, and two zones of significant slip were detected. An average slip of 1 meter was inferred.

=== Aftershocks ===
At least 7 aftershocks above magnitude 5 were recorded by the USGS, With the strongest being a magnitude 5.6 on May 3, 2021.

== Damage and casualties ==
220 public buildings around Khövsgöl lake and as far south as Mörön were damaged with cracked walls and broken windows, while two houses were completely destroyed. Although no one was killed, 59 people were injured and some had to be treated for symptoms such as heart problems and high blood pressure. Eight buildings were damaged in parts of Russia closest to the epicentre.

== See also ==
- List of earthquakes in 2021
