= 2022 Hormozgan earthquakes =

2022 earthquakes in Hormozgan Province, Iran

- Location within Iran
- UTC time: 2022-07-01 21:32:08
- 2022-07-01 23:25:14
- ISC event: 624504922
- 624504901
- USGS-ANSS: ComCat
- ComCat
- Local date: 2 July 2022
- Local time: 02:02
- 03:55
- Magnitude: 6.0 M_{w}
- 6.0 M_{w}
- Depth: 16.0 km (9.9 mi); 9.0 km (5.6 mi)
- Epicenter: 26.899°N 55.321°E
- Fault: Zagros fold and thrust belt
- Type: Doublet; Reverse
- Max. intensity: MMI VII (Very strong)
- Aftershocks: At least 12; strongest is 5.7 M_{w}
- Casualties: 7 dead, 111 injured

The 2022 Hormozgan earthquakes were doublet earthquakes that struck southern Iran on 1 July 2022. The earthquakes, which occurred around two hours apart, killed seven people and injured dozens more.

== Tectonic setting ==
Hormozgan province lies at the southern margin of the collision zone between the Eurasian Plate and the Arabian Plate. This collision lead to the creation of the Zagros Mountains and the Iranian Plateau. The main fault system that runs through the Zagros Range is the Zagros fold and thrust belt, which has been responsible for causing many earthquakes in Iran over the years.

== Earthquake ==
This earthquake is part of a sequence of earthquakes on 1 July 2022, in southern Iran that began with a magnitude 6.0, followed by a magnitude 5.7 aftershock two hours later, and a magnitude 6.0 earthquake one minute after the magnitude 5.7 earthquake. The first two events were initially reported as 6.1 magnitude, while the third was an initial 6.2. They were revised down several hours later. Earthquake sequences similar to this one have previously occurred in the Zagros Mountains, with a similar sequence occurring in November 2021.

=== Aftershocks ===
By 3 July, there were twelve aftershocks, the strongest of which was 5.7 M_{w}. On 23 July, two more aftershocks occurred, measuring 5.4 and 5.6 M_{w}. The two quakes caused further damage to houses, and caused one indirect injury.

=== Intensity ===
Modified Mercalli intensities in selected locations
MMI	Locations
MMI VII (Very strong)	Sayeh Khvosh
MMI VI (Strong)	Bandar Khamir, Bandar Lengeh
MMI V (Moderate)	Bandar Abbas
MMI IV (Light)	Sharjah, Ras al-Khaimah, Ajman, Minab

The earthquakes had a maximum intensity of VII (Very strong). The strongest shaking was reported in the provinces of Hormozgan and Fars. The earthquake was felt throughout the Middle East in countries such as the United Arab Emirates, Oman, Saudi Arabia, Bahrain and Qatar, as well as parts of Pakistan and Afghanistan, which were severely affected by a more deadly earthquake 10 days earlier.

=== Other events ===
Two offshore earthquakes occurred in the same province near the town of Kish a month before the July events. The earthquakes measured 5.5 and 5.6 on the moment magnitude scale, and occurred at a depth of 10.0 km. The first earthquake injured four and damaged 20 buildings. The latter caused one death and 37 injuries.

Another earthquake, measuring magnitude 5.9 struck the same area on 16 March of that same year. It caused two injuries and minor damage in several villages.

== Impact ==
Twelve towns and over 300 villages, with a combined population of around 900,000, were impacted by the earthquakes. The village of Sayeh Khvosh, home to around 1,100 people, was completely destroyed. The governor of Hormozgan, Mahdi Dousti, said that it would take several months to rebuild the village. In Bandar Khamir, at least 45 houses were affected, and 35 others were damaged in the town of Kong. In total, at least 392 houses were damaged or destroyed. There were also reports of power outages. A road between Bandar Khamir and Bandar Lengeh was blocked by a landslide. Seven people were killed and 111 others were injured. At least 22 of the injuries were serious enough to require hospitalisation.

== See also ==
- List of earthquakes in 2022
- List of earthquakes in Iran
