= 2021 East Java earthquake =

Earthquake in Indonesia

2021 East Java Earthquake
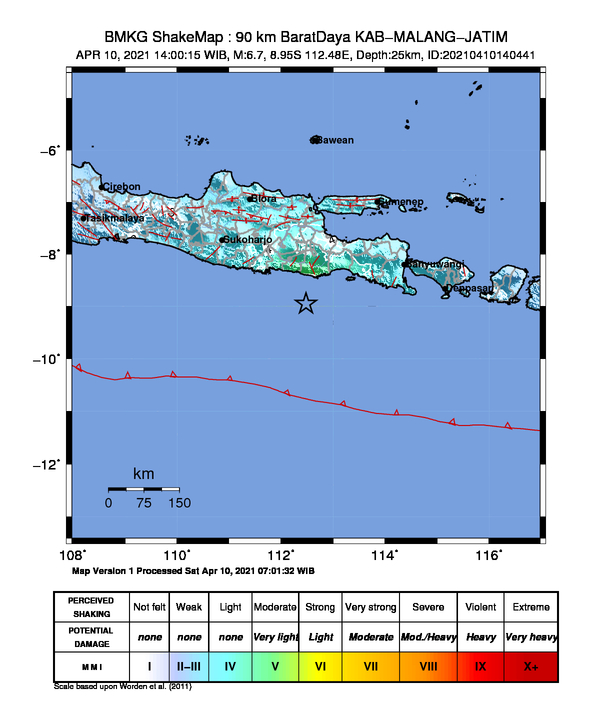

- Location within Java Location within Indonesia
- UTC time: 2021-04-10 07:00:15
- ISC event: 620236368
- USGS-ANSS: ComCat
- Local date: 10 April 2021
- Local time: 14:00:15 WIB (UTC+7)
- Duration: 12-30 seconds
- Magnitude: 6.1 M_{w} (BMKG) 6.0 M_{w} (USGS)
- Depth: 80 km (50 mi) 67 km (42 mi) (USGS)
- Epicenter: 8.83°S 112.50°E BMKG
- Areas affected: East Java
- Max. intensity: MMI V (Moderate)
- Tsunami: No
- Landslides: Yes
- Aftershocks: 3 Largest; 5.1 M_{w} (as of 11 April 2021)
- Casualties: 10 dead, 104 injured

An earthquake occurred on 10 April 2021 at 14:00 local time (UTC+07:00) off the south coast of eastern Java. The epicenter of the earthquake is located 44 km south–southwest of Gondanglegi Kulon in East Java province. Measuring 6.0 or 6.1 on the moment magnitude scale (M_{w}) and having a depth of 82.3 km, the earthquake caused moderate shaking measuring V on the Mercalli intensity scale. At least 10 individuals are known to have died from the earthquake and another 104 were seriously injured.

== Earthquake ==
The earthquake initially registered magnitude 6.7 at a depth of 25 km, but was revised to 6.1 at 60 km depth by the BMKG. This earthquake occurred as a result of oblique–slip faulting at an intermediate depth just off the coast of East Java. Based on its location and depth of hypocenter, this earthquake is a medium-sized event due to subduction activity. According to Rahmat Triyono, Head of Earthquake and Tsunami Center at BMKG, the earthquake did not have the capacity to generate a large tsunami, but did warn residents in the affected area to watch out for landslides. Because of its depth however, the earthquake was also felt at distant locations including Bali and Yogyakarta. In Lombok, many visitors at a shopping mall evacuated to the first floor when they felt the shaking.

On May 21, a magnitude 5.9 earthquake occurred about 27 km from the epicenter of the 10 April earthquake. This is not an aftershock of the 10 April event as the May 21 event was deeper than the 10 April event.

== Damage ==
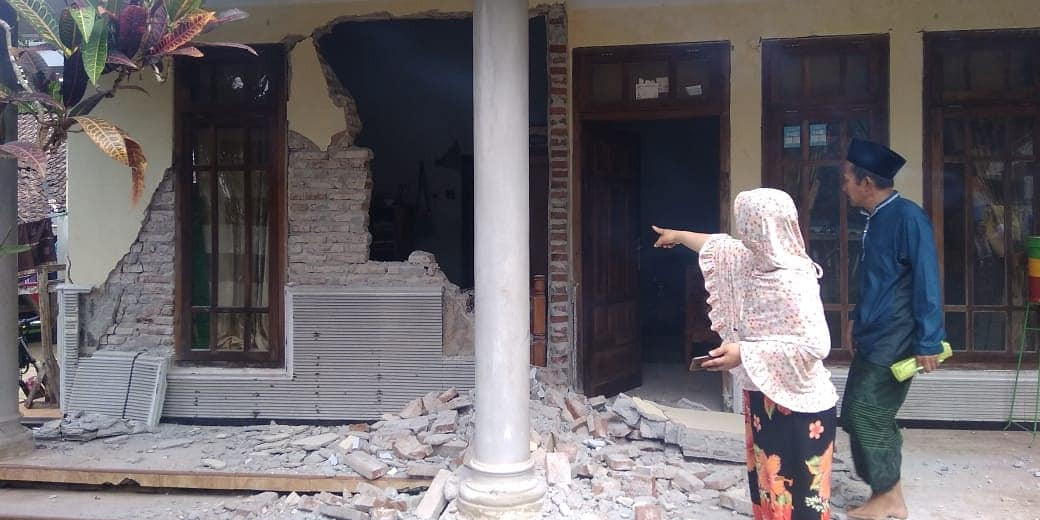
Damage to the exterior of a building in Malang Regency

Despite having light to moderate shaking, the earthquake caused significant damage to buildings and triggered landslides in East Java. A total of 4,404 homes in the affected area were damaged, with 1,160 of them being serious. Latest reports suggest some 170 schools, 12 healthcare buildings, 64 religious locations and 15 other public infrastructures have been compromised. Eighty-five (85) buildings have also been damaged to the extent that repair works are impossible.

A survey conducted by the BMKG to uncover the cause of damage revealed that many houses were not constructed with earthquake-resistant features. Shoddy construction methods that did not meet the latest safety codes resulted in structural failures during the earthquake. The Volcanological Survey of Indonesia added that many of these houses were constructed on young quaternary volcanic and alluvium deposits which amplified the strength of ground motion during the earthquake.

=== Blitar ===
Among the infrastructures affected were a hospital and the Blitar Regency Government building. Both buildings suffered partial collapse of their ceilings. The Mardi Waluyo Hospital sustained serious damage when its ceiling suddenly collapsed, littering an unspecified number of patient rooms with ceiling and electrical components. A spokesman at the hospital said there were no casualties resulting from the collapsing roof. Many residential homes and schools were also damaged by the earthquake, with walls, windows, and roofs falling off. Many shops also had items falling off their shelves. Two mosques in the Blitar Regency were also affected by the quake.

According to the Indonesian National Board for Disaster Management (BNPB), ten homes suffered heavy damage while 85 were moderately affected. Another 217 houses had light structural damage. Nine offices and three village halls were also harmed by the earthquake.

=== Malang ===
The earthquake disrupted the supply of electricity and operations at a power station, causing blackouts in parts of the Malang Regency.

At least 525 homes had minimal damage, while an additional 114 had moderate damage. The Malang Regency was the most affected area in East Java, with at least 57 homes seriously damaged. Fourteen schools, six bridges, eight schools, and 26 buildings of worship were also damaged.

=== Batu ===
In Batu City, the earthquake knocked off the head of a seven-meter tall gorilla statue at the Batu Secret Zoo. There were no casualties from the collapse.

== Casualties ==
Ten individuals were confirmed fatalities of the earthquake, while at least 104 others were injured. Five of the deceased were from the Tempursari District, in the Lumajang Regency. A man in Lumajang was killed after being struck by a falling boulder while riding a motorcycle. Another person on that same motorcycle was rushed to a hospital but died from massive injuries.

In the Ampelgading Subdistrict, Malang Regency, another three were found dead. The Acting Chief Executive of BPBD added that most of the victims died from injuries inflicted when their homes collapsed. Another victim, an elderly person also became a fatality of the earthquake three days later. The person, in their 90s, succumbed to injuries while undergoing treatment at a hospital in Malang.

== Response ==
In the immediate aftermath of the earthquake, the Malang Regency government declared the event an emergency and established a disaster response post. A Quick Reaction Team was also sent to survey the impacted regions. They also ensured that survivors who had lost their homes to the earthquake would reside temporary shelters. Fourteen severely damaged homes would be cleared away for the construction of makeshift homes which is expected to take ten days to complete.

The BNPB had also reassured some residents that homes with moderate or light damage would be restored, with assistance from local government agencies. The Ministry of Public Works and Housing would collaborate with the BNPB in efforts to repair homes that were seriously affected by the earthquake.

Stimulant funds would be provided to residents who had their homes affected, by the BNPB. Those with lightly damaged houses would receive 10 million rupiah, 25 million for moderately damaged homes, and 50 million for the most severe cases.

== See also ==
- List of earthquakes in 2021
- List of earthquakes in Indonesia
- Lists of 21st-century earthquakes
- 2018 East Java earthquake
