= Sayeh Khvosh =

Sayeh Khvosh سايه خوش
- Village
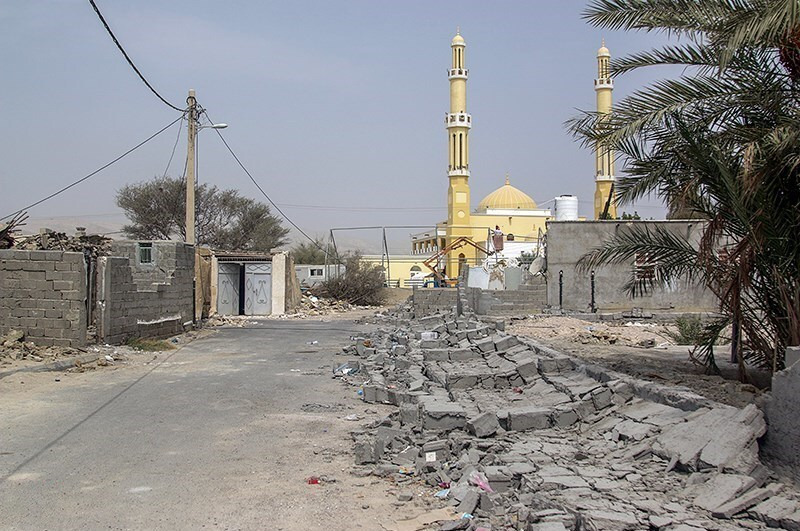
- Image showing aftermath of an Earthquake in Sayeh Khvosh Village

- Location within Iran
- Coordinates: 26.8361°N 55.368°E
- Country: Iran
- Province: Hormozgan
- County: Bandar Lengeh
- Bakhsh: Central
- Rural District: Dezhgan

Population (2006)
  - Total: 1,101
- Time zone: UTC+3:30 (IRST)
  - Summer (DST): UTC+4:30 (IRDT)

Sayeh Khvosh (Persian: سايه خوش, also Romanized as Sāyeh Khvosh, Sāyeh Khosh, and Sāyeh Khowsh; also known as Sāyeh Krowsh) is a village in Dezhgan Rural District, in the Central District of Bandar Lengeh County, Hormozgan Province, Iran. At the 2006 census, its population was 1,101, across 250 families. Estimates in 2022 were around 300 people.

== History ==
The village was devastated by two magnitude 6 earthquakes on July 1, 2022, which killed seven and injured over 110.
