= Burica Peninsula =

Peninsula in Puntarenas Province, Costa Rica

Coordinates: 8°10′N 82°54′W

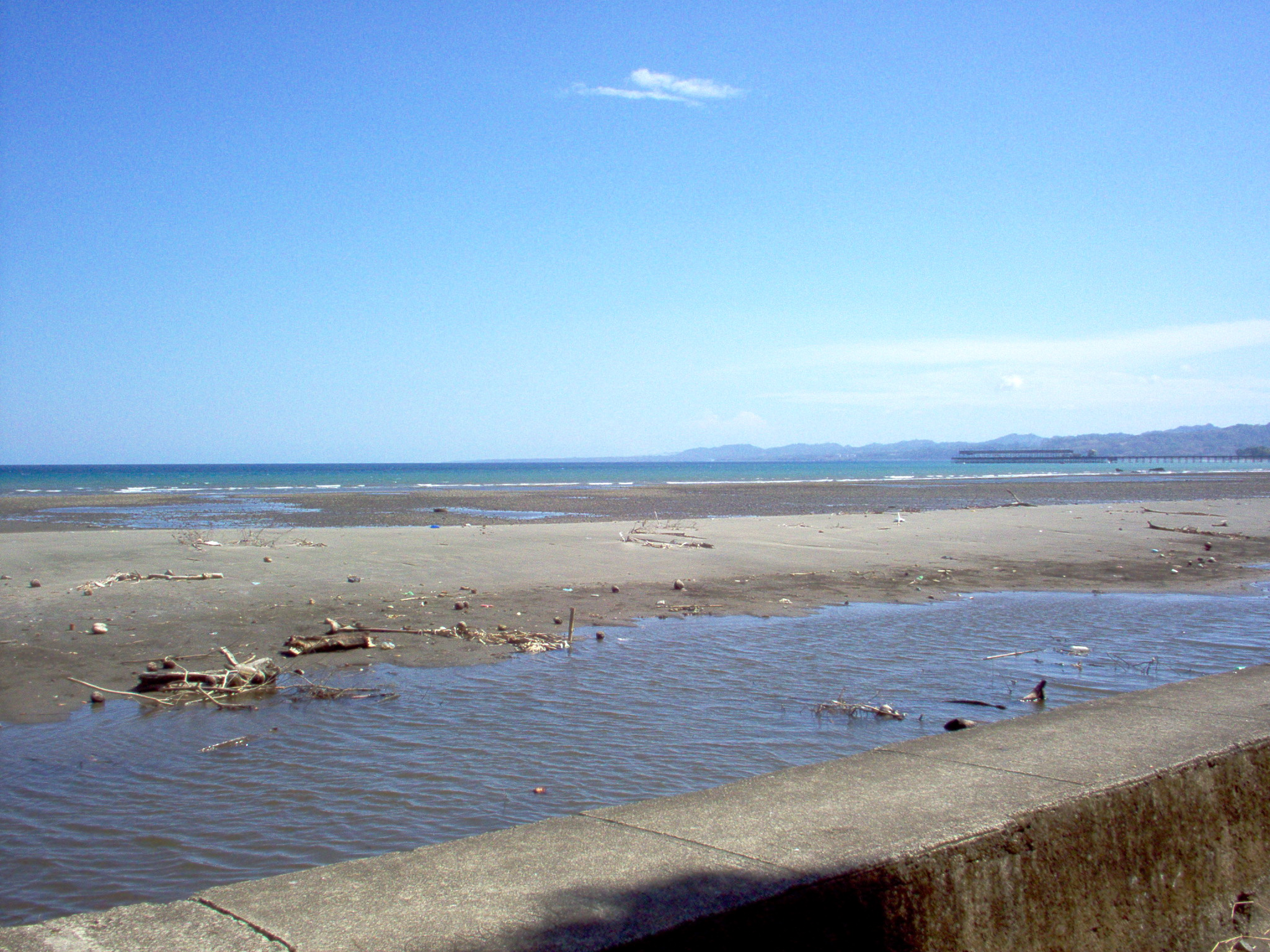
In the background, view of the peninsula from the Panamanian side Burica.

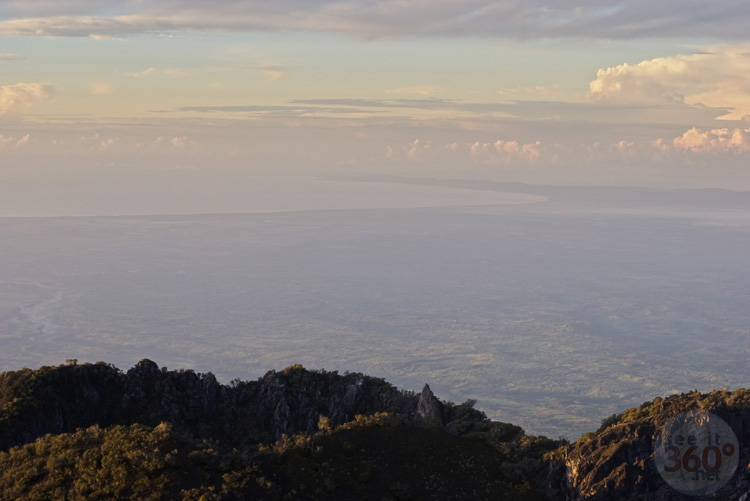
View Burica Peninsula from the top of Volcan Baru.

The Burica Peninsula is a coastal relief that juts south into the Pacific Ocean and is divided into two areas: the west side belongs to Costa Rica, and the area that belongs to Panama, which dominates the east and about two-thirds of the peninsula. The Costa Rican side is the southernmost of the country (except for the island of Coco). On this peninsula there are several points including Punta Burica (on the Panamanian) southernmost point of the peninsula, Punta Gorda and Punta El Mangle (both in the Costa Rican side).

== Population ==
This area is inhabited by people whose main activity is fishing.

The Panamanian section is in Chiriquí Province, with the city of Puerto Armuelles, the most populous of the peninsula. Other localities include Guanábano, Las Mellizas, and Limones. On the Costa Rican side stands the village of Las Peñas. In 2006 Panama allocated a special area for industrial development in the area.
