= Geno Biosphere Reserve =

Coordinates: 27°23′N 56°07′E

UNESCO Biosphere Reserves in Iran

The Geno Biosphere Reserve (Persian: ذخیره‌گاه زیست‌کره گنو), with a total area of 27,500 hectares, is situated in the Hormozgan province of Iran. It has been designated as a protected area by the Iranian Department of Environment in 1976.

UNESCO reported about 40,300 people living within the boundaries of the biosphere reserve in 2000.

Beside a number of hot springs situated in the area, flora and fauna include:

- Flora: pomegranate, date palm, black maidenhair fern, caraway, common yarrow, pennyroyal, milkweed, primrose
- Fauna:
  - mammals: gazelle, gray wolf, bear, fox, leopard, wild boar, hyena, jackal, rabbit,
  - birds: grey partridge, eagle, falcon, Eurasian collared dove, see-see partridge, common wood pigeon, cinereous vulture, lark, pipit, common house martin, white-eared bulbul

== Gallery ==
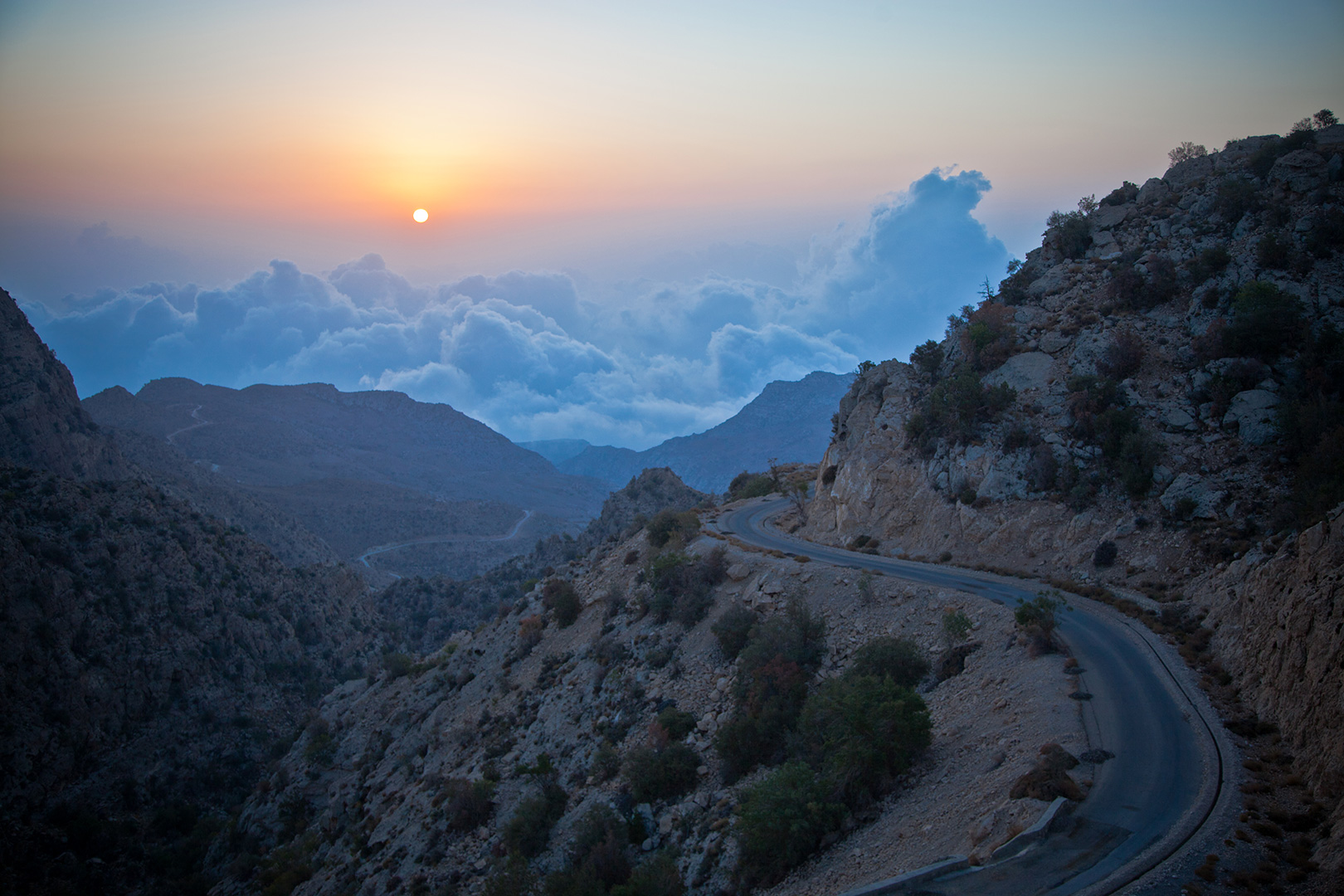

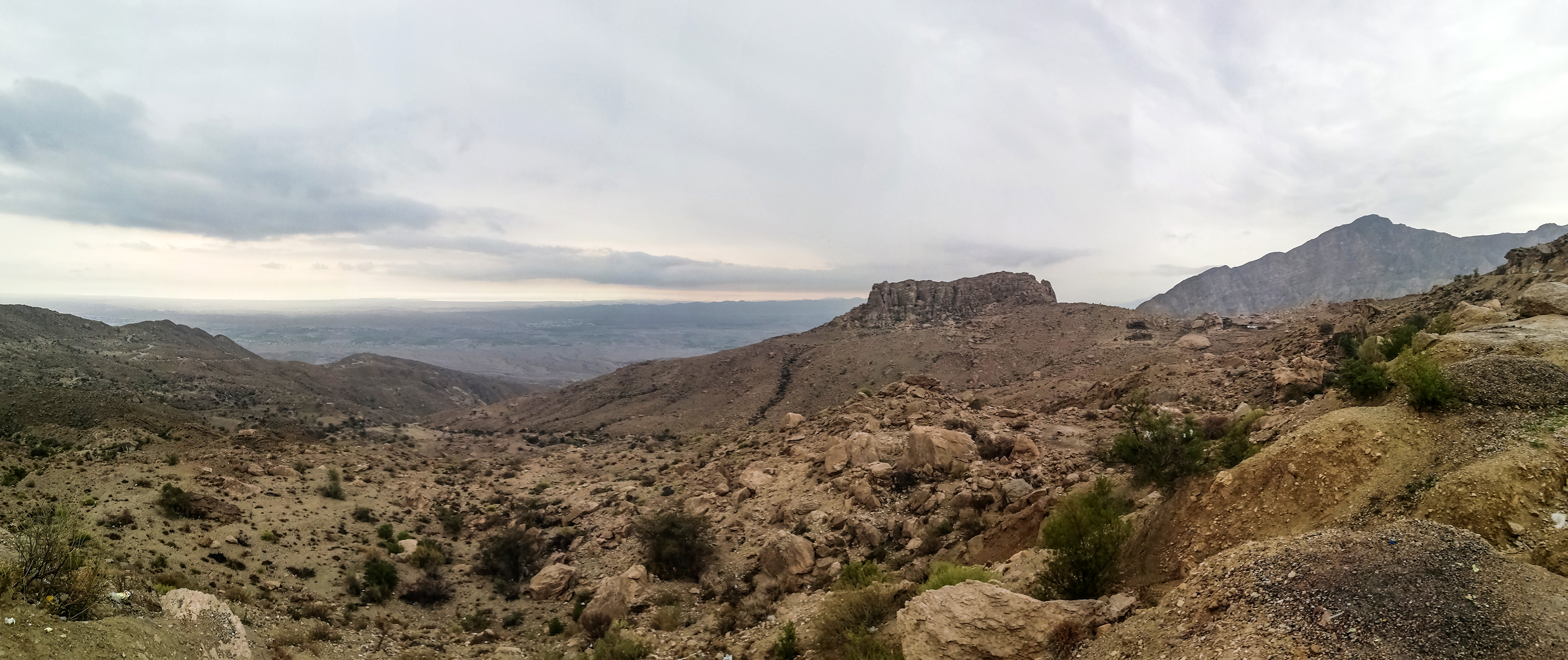

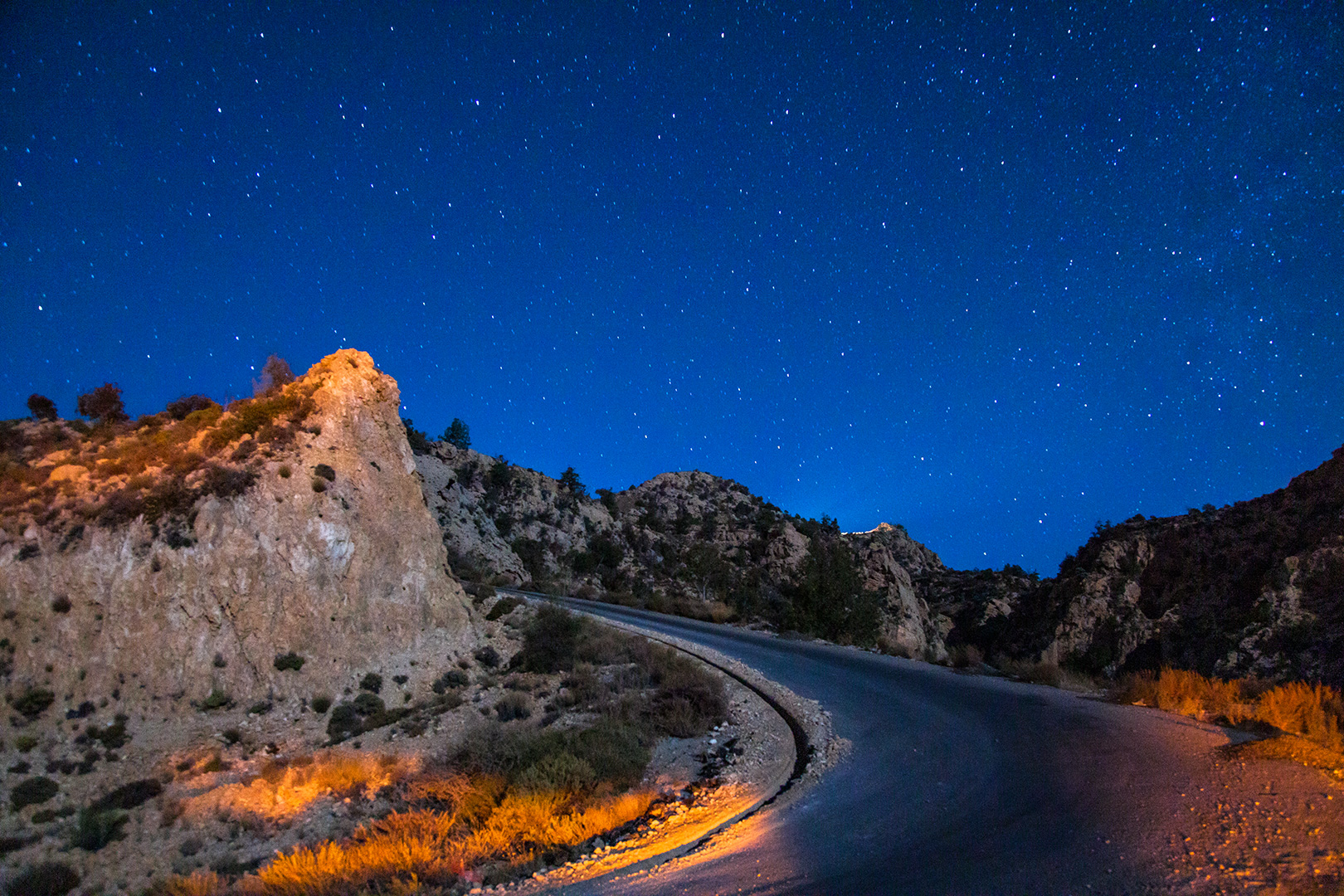

== See also ==
- International Network of Geoparks
- List of Geoparks
