= Seresht =

Seresht سرشط
- Village
- Location within Iran
- Coordinates: 32°20′00″N 49°42′00″E
- Country: Iran
- Province: Khuzestan
- County: Andika
- Bakhsh: Chelo
- Rural District: Chelo

Population (2006)
  - Total: 252
- Time zone: UTC+3:30 (IRST)
  - Summer (DST): UTC+4:30 (IRDT)

Seresht (Persian: سرشط, also Romanized as Sereshṭ; also known as Sar-i-Shat) is a village in Chelo Rural District, Chelo District, Andika County, Khuzestan Province, Iran. At the 2006 census, its population was 252, in 36 families.
