= 2021 Sisakht earthquake =

Earthquake in southern Iran

- Location within Iran
- UTC time: 2021-02-17 18:35:35
- ISC event: 619839495
- USGS-ANSS: ComCat
- Local date: February 17, 2021
- Local time: 22:05:35 IRST
- Magnitude: 5.4 M_{w}
- Depth: 7 km (4.3 mi)
- Epicenter: 30.839°N 51.365°E
- Areas affected: Iran
- Max. intensity: MMI VII (Very strong)
- Aftershocks: 4.9 M_{w}
- Casualties: 63 injured (mainshock); 14 injured (aftershock)

The 2021 Sisakht earthquake which had a magnitude of 5.4 M_{w}, struck 28 km northwest of Yasuj, Iran at around 18:35 (UTC) on February 17. No deaths were reported however 63 people sustained injuries and extensive damage was observed in numerous cities near the epicenter. On February 24, a 4.9 magnitude aftershock struck nearby, injuring a further 14 people.

== Casualties and damage ==
A total of 19 cities with a total population of 257,661 people, including 1,114 villages were affected by the earthquake. According to the Ministry of housing, about 380 houses were severely damaged in Sisakht and 47 more in Samirom. At least 77 people had been reported to have suffered injuries from falling debris, 14 of which were from a magnitude 4.9 aftershock that struck about a week later. About 1,800 tents were sent to aid those who were afflicted by the tremor.

== Response ==
According to the IRCS (Iranian Red Crescent Society), on the first day of the quake 147 villages were rapidly assessed including 121 villages in Kohgilouye-Boyerahmad and 26 others in Isfahan. Five emergency ambulances were deployed to aid the injured people with basic healthcare service. Two emergency camps were also set up for the people in need, however most preferred to stay in their house yards, but they were given one emergency tent per family. Due to torrential rains that occurred in the area, an estimated 10 tons of plastic nylon was distributed to Sisakht, of which 6.6 tons of nylon were sent among the quake victims to cover the roofs of the tents. There were also about 945 blankets, 6,644 kilograms of plastic sheets, 214 sets of heaters 1,965 food parcels and 70 groundsheets were distributed to the victims.

== See also ==
- List of earthquakes in 2021
- List of earthquakes in Iran
