= Hovtashen =

Hovtashen Հովտաշեն
- Location within Armenia Location within Ararat
- Coordinates: 40°01′28″N 44°27′00″E
- Country: Armenia
- Province: Ararat
- Municipality: Artashat

Population (2011)
  - Total: 1,034
- Time zone: UTC+4
  - Summer (DST): UTC+5

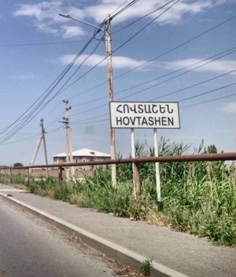
Entrance to Hovtashen

Hovtashen (Armenian: Հովտաշեն) is a village in the Artashat Municipality of the Ararat Province of Armenia. The village was founded in the 1920s, and initially was mostly populated by Azeri people. In the 1930s, Armenians from Surmalu, Nakhchivan, and Nukha settled in the village; in the 1950s, people from Hatsavan and other villages of the Abovyan region, while in the 1970s, people from the Vayq (Azizbekov) region settled in the village.
