= Punta Burica (Panama) =

Coordinates: 8.0424°N 82.8721°W

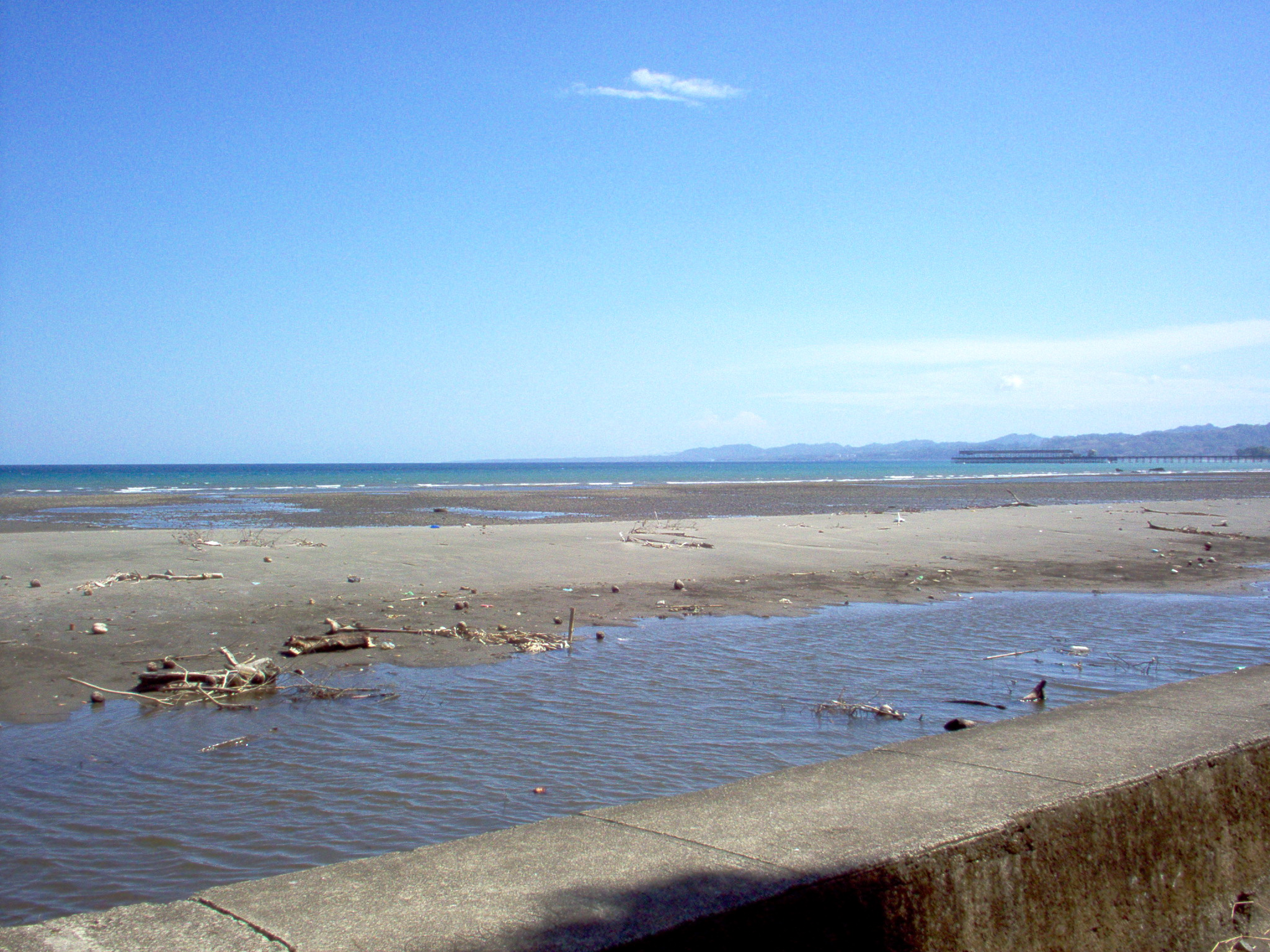
View Burica Peninsula (background) along with the Punta Burica (center).

Punta Burica is a small coastal peninsula−reef extending south of the Burica Peninsula on the Pacific border between Costa Rica and Panama.

It is partially in the province of Puntarenas of extreme southeastern Costa Rica, and to the east in Chiriquí Province of Panama.

To the south is the small island of Burica.
