= List of earthquakes in 2025 =

Earthquakes in 2025
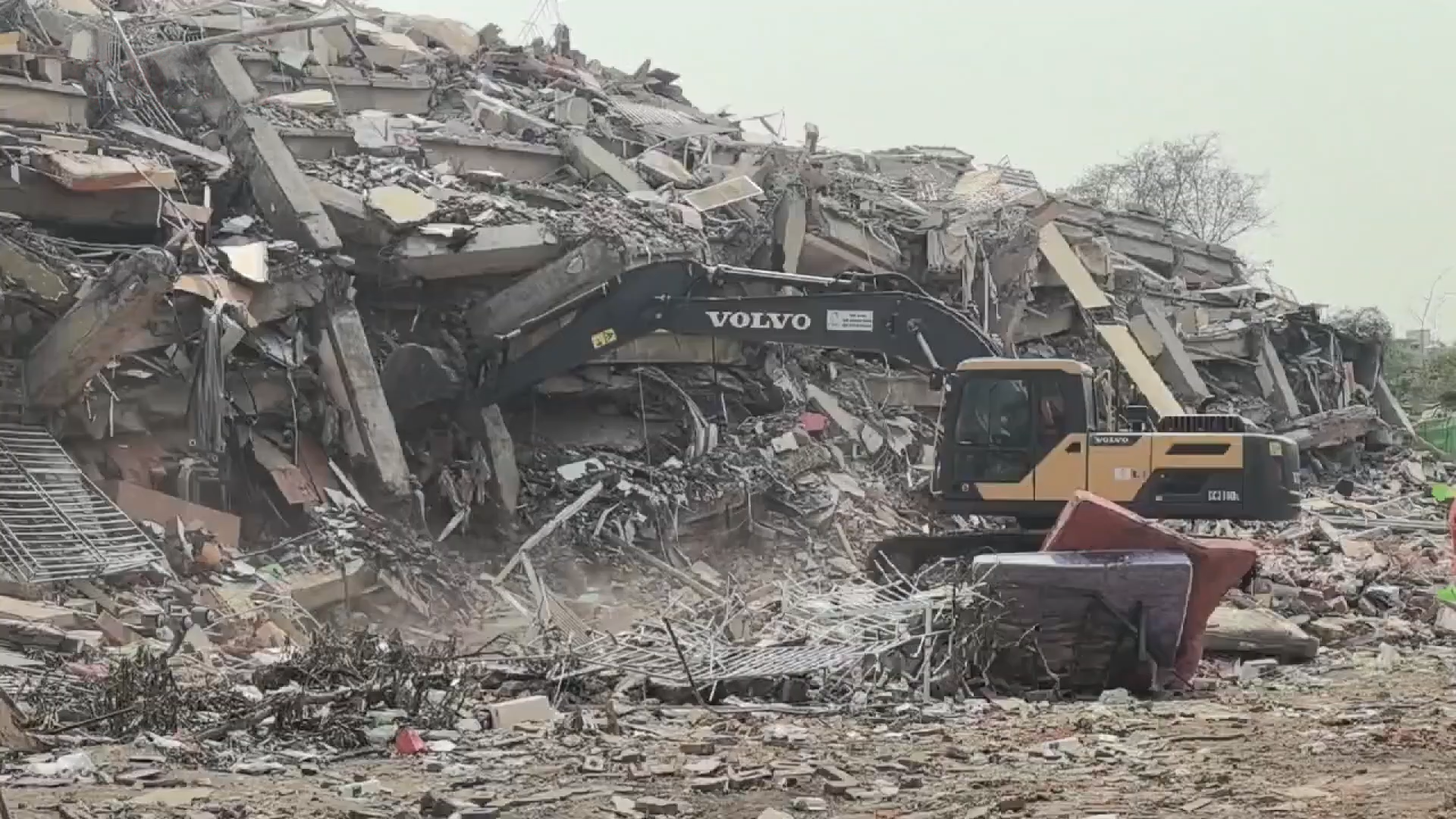
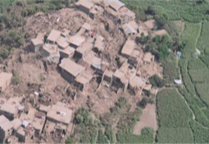
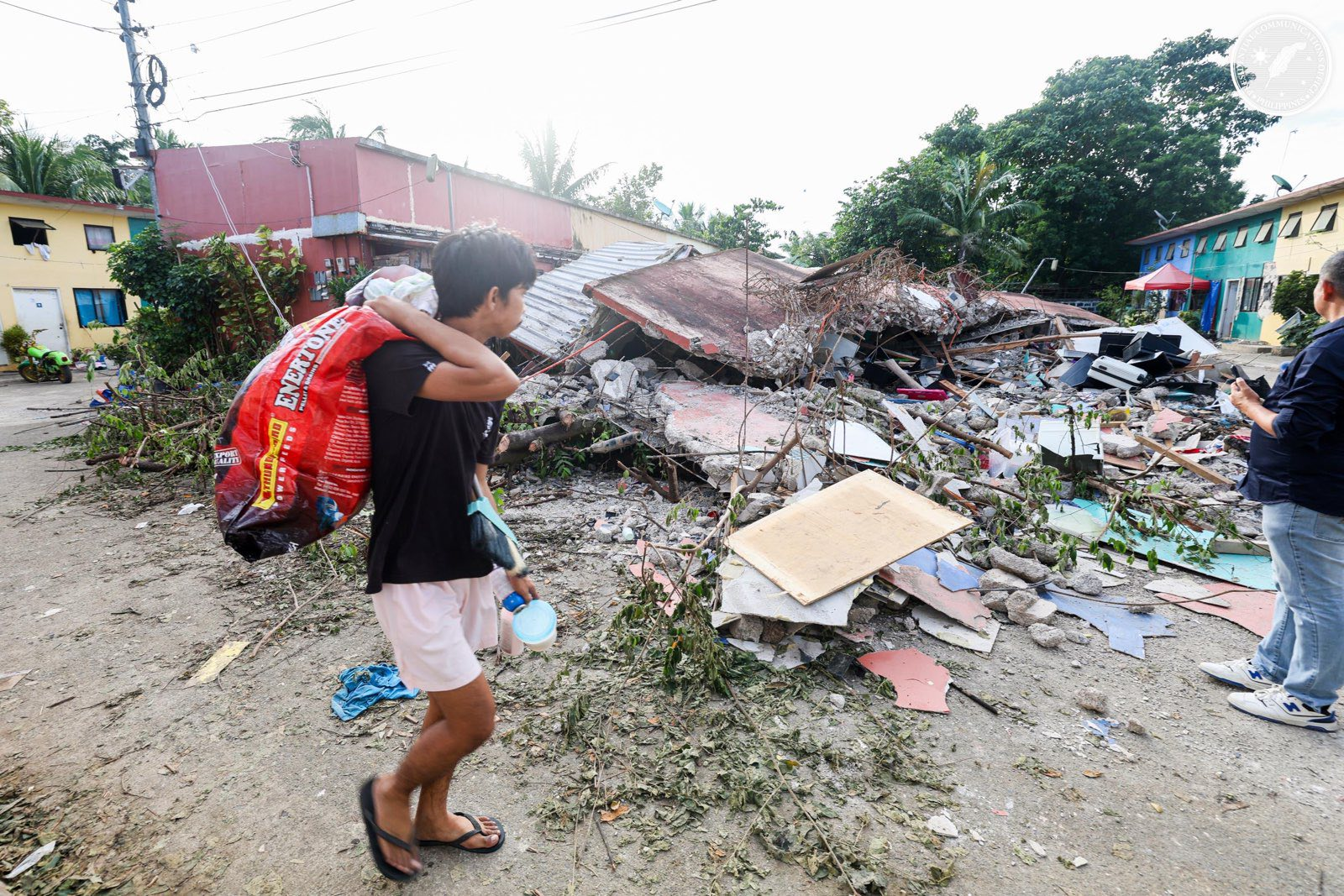
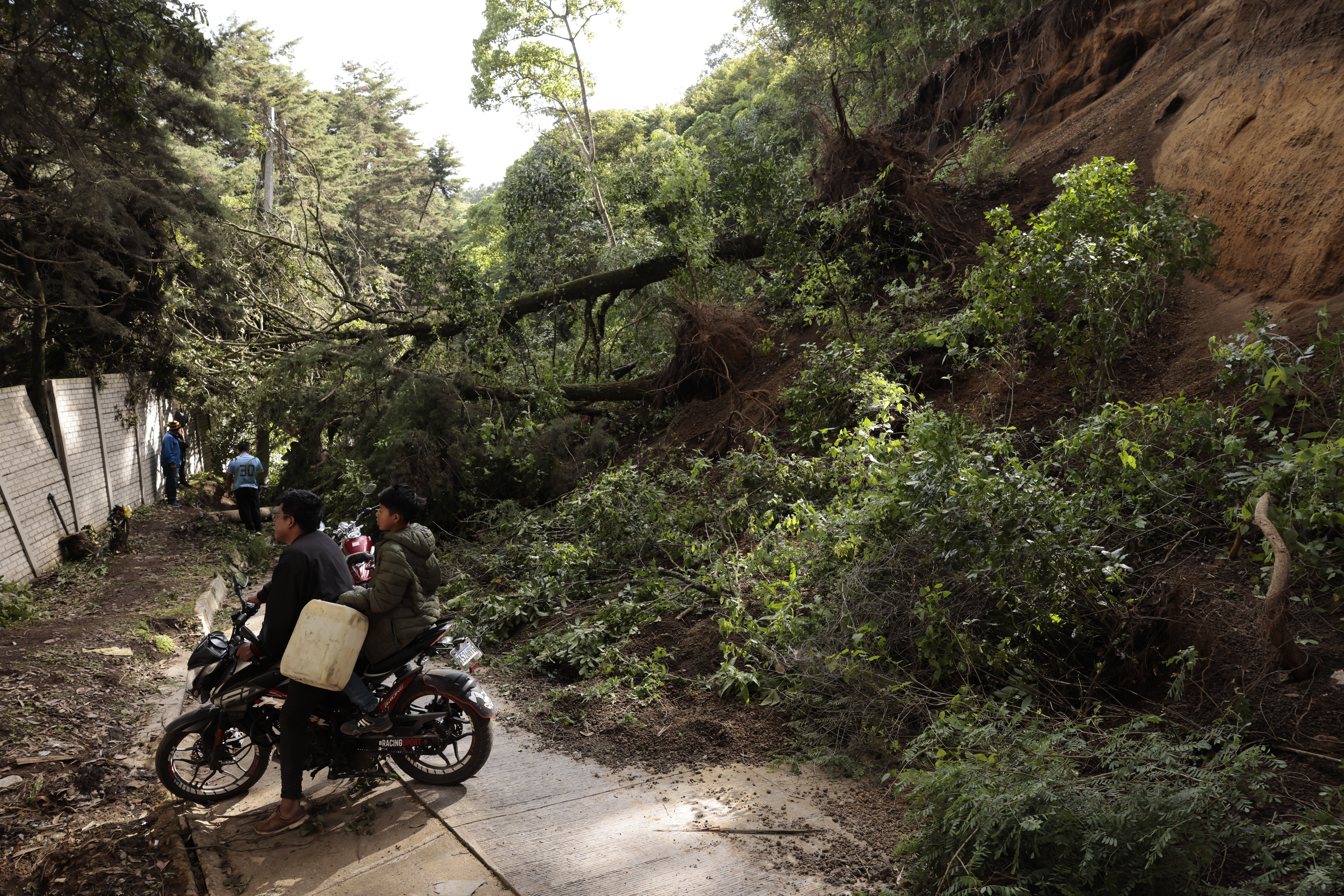
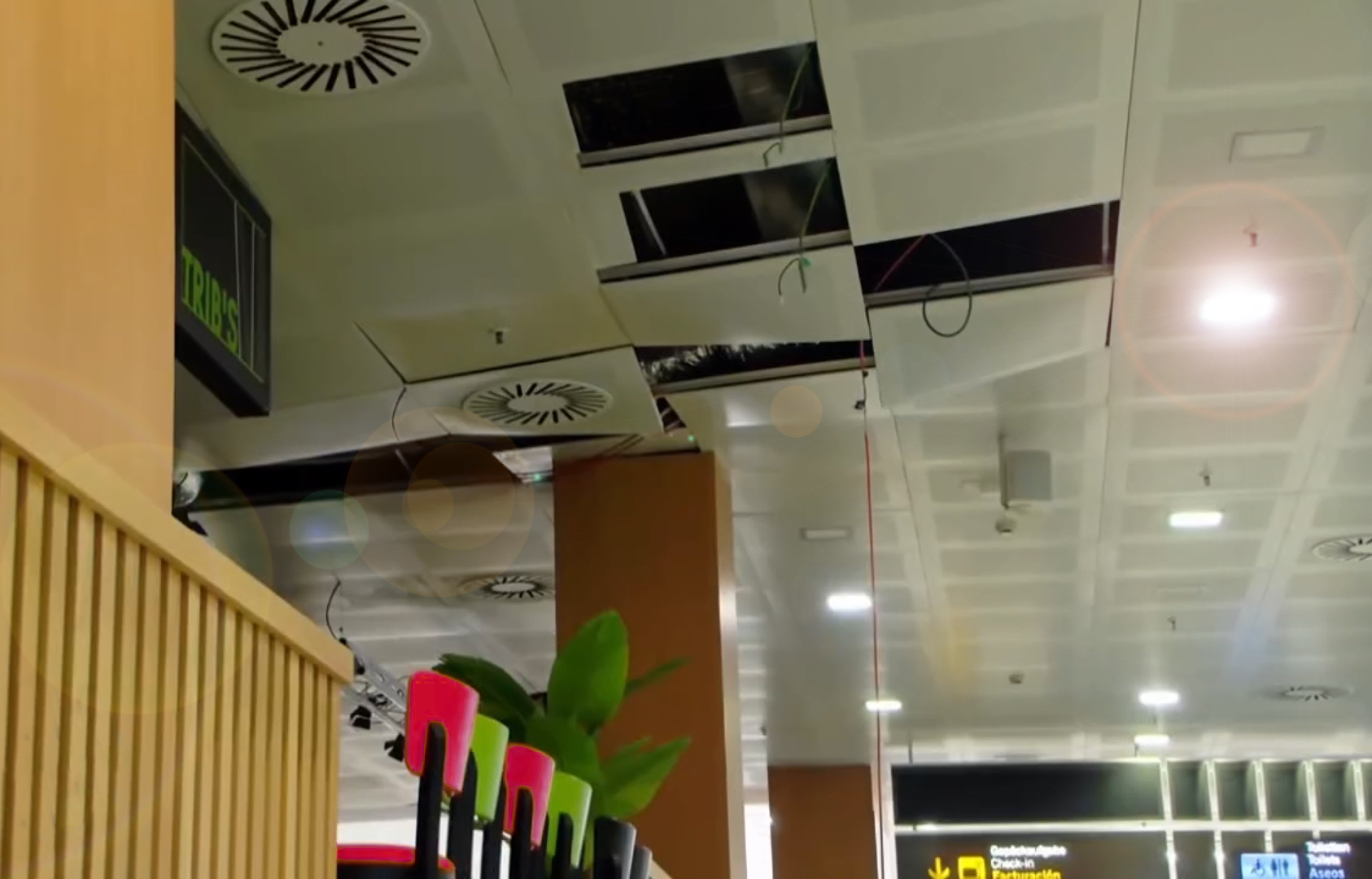
- From top, left to right: Collapsed building in Mandalay, Myanmar • A village destroyed in Kunar, Afghanistan • Building destroyed in Cebu, Philippines • A landslide in Santa María de Jesús, Guatemala • Damaged ceiling panels at Almería Airport, Spain

Approximate epicenters of notable earthquakes in 2025
- 4.0–5.9 magnitude
- 6.0–6.9 magnitude
- 7.0–7.9 magnitude
- 8.0+ magnitude
- Strongest: 8.8 M_{w} Russia
- Deadliest: 7.7 M_{w} Myanmar; 5,456 deaths
- Total fatalities: 7,972–8,246

Number by magnitude
- 9.0+: 0
- 8.0–8.9: 1
- 7.0–7.9: 15
- 6.0–6.9: 129
- 5.0–5.9: 1,984
- 4.0–4.9: 16,023

This is a list of earthquakes in 2025. Only earthquakes of magnitude 6 or above are included, unless they result in significant damage and/or casualties. All dates are listed according to UTC time. The maximum intensities are based on the Modified Mercalli intensity scale. Earthquake magnitudes are based on data from the United States Geological Survey (USGS).

The year 2025 was an active and highly deadly year for earthquakes, with 16 major events and around 8,000 fatalities. The M_{w} 8.8 Kamchatka earthquake was the first ≥M8 earthquake since 2021, and the sixth-largest instrumentally recorded earthquake since records began. The deadliest event of the year was a M_{w} 7.7–7.9 event in Myanmar, which caused unprecedented destruction in much of the country and killed at least 5,400 people, although the true death toll is believed to be significantly higher. This was followed by a M_{w} 6.0 event in Afghanistan in August that killed over 2,200 people, almost all of them in Kunar Province. Other notable and deadly earthquakes occurred in China, the Philippines, Bangladesh and Guatemala.

== Compared to other years ==
Number of earthquakes worldwide for 2015–2025 []
Magnitude	2015	2016	2017	2018	2019	2020	2021	2022	2023	2024	2025
8.0–9.9	1	0	1	1	1	0	3	0	0	0	1
7.0–7.9	18	16	6	16	9	9	16	11	19	10	15
6.0–6.9	127	131	104	117	135	112	138	116	128	89	129
5.0–5.9	1,425	1,561	1,456	1,688	1,500	1,329	2,070	1,599	1,633	1,408	1,984
4.0–4.9	13,776	13,700	11,541	12,785	11,899	12,513	15,069	14,022	14,450	12,668	16,023
Total	15,351	15,411	13,113	14,614	13,555	13,967	17,297	15,749	16,231	14,176	18,152

Map of earthquakes in 2025 - M 5.0 or greater (map data)

== By death toll ==
Rank	Death toll	Magnitude	Location	MMI	Depth (km)	Date	Event
1	5,456	7.7	Myanmar, Sagaing	X (Extreme)	10.0	March 28	2025 Myanmar earthquake
2	2,217	6.0	Afghanistan, Kunar	IX (Violent)	8.0	August 31	2025 Kunar earthquake
3	126–400	7.1	China, Tibet Autonomous Region	IX (Violent)	10.0	January 7	2025 Tibet earthquake
4	79	6.9	Philippines, Central Visayas offshore	IX (Violent)	10.0	September 30	2025 Cebu earthquake
5	31	6.2	Afghanistan, Balkh	VII (Very strong)	28.0	November 2	2025 Balkh earthquake
6	10	5.4	Bangladesh, Dhaka	VI (Strong)	27.0	November 21	2025 Bangladesh earthquake
6	10	7.4	Philippines, Davao offshore	VII (Very strong)	59.4	October 10	2025 Davao Oriental earthquakes

Listed are earthquakes with at least 10 dead.

== By magnitude ==
Rank	Magnitude	Death toll	Location	MMI	Depth (km)	Date	Event
1	8.8	1	Russia, Kamchatka offshore	IX (Violent)	35.0	July 29	2025 Kamchatka earthquake
2	7.8	0	Russia, Kamchatka offshore	VIII (Severe)	19.5	September 18	-
3	7.7	5,456	Myanmar, Sagaing	X (Extreme)	10.0	March 28	2025 Myanmar earthquake
4	7.6	0	Japan, Aomori offshore	VIII (Severe)	45.5	December 8	2025 Aomori earthquake
4	7.6	0	Honduras, Swan Islands offshore	V (Moderate)	10.0	February 8	-
4	7.6	0	Antarctica offshore, Drake Passage	IV (Light)	10.5	October 10	-
7	7.5	0	Antarctica offshore, Drake Passage	V (Moderate)	10.8	August 22	-
8	7.4	10	Philippines, Davao offshore	VII (Very strong)	59.4	October 10	2025 Davao Oriental earthquakes
8	7.4	0	Russia, Kamchatka offshore	VIII (Severe)	34.0	July 20	-
8	7.4	0	Russia, Kamchatka offshore	VIII (Severe)	39.5	September 13	-
8	7.4	0	Chile, Magallanes offshore	V (Moderate)	10.0	May 2	-
12	7.3	0	United States, Alaska offshore	VII (Very strong)	38.0	July 16	-
13	7.1	126–400	China, Tibet Autonomous Region	IX (Violent)	10.0	January 7	2025 Tibet earthquake
14	7.0	0	United States, Alaska	VIII (Severe)	5.0	December 6	-
14	7.0	0	Tonga, Haʻapai offshore	VI (Strong)	31.0	March 30	-
14	7.0	0	Australia, Macquarie Island offshore	IV (Light)	31.0	July 28	-

Listed are earthquakes with at least 7.0 magnitude.

== By month ==
=== January ===
January
- Strongest: 7.1 M_{w} China
- Deadliest: 7.1 M_{w} China; 126–400 deaths
- Total fatalities: 130–404

Number by magnitude
- 9.0+: 0
- 8.0–8.9: 0
- 7.0–7.9: 1
- 6.0–6.9: 6
- 5.0–5.9: 145
- 4.0–4.9: 1,261

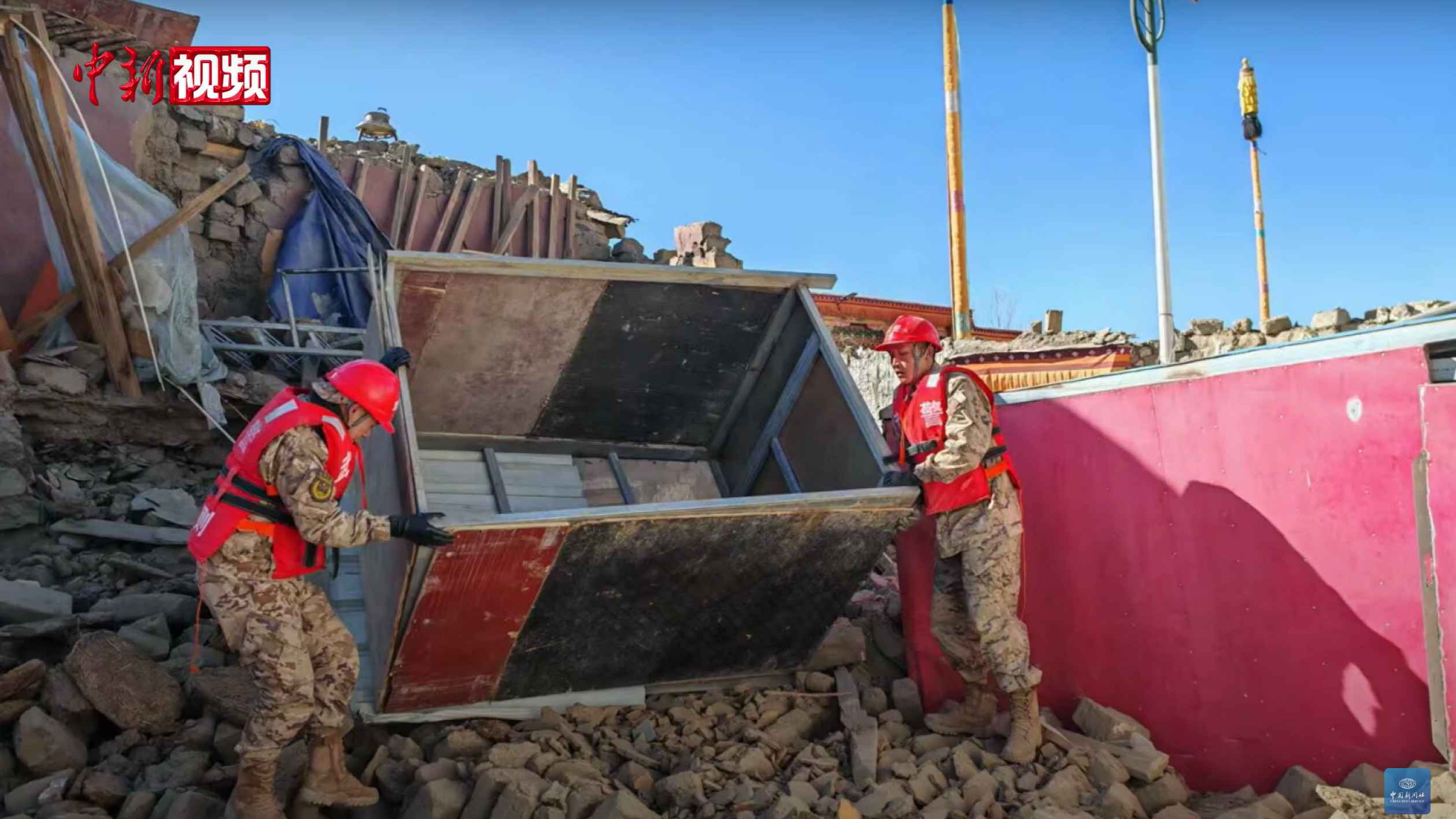
People's Armed Police conducting disaster relief in Tibet, China

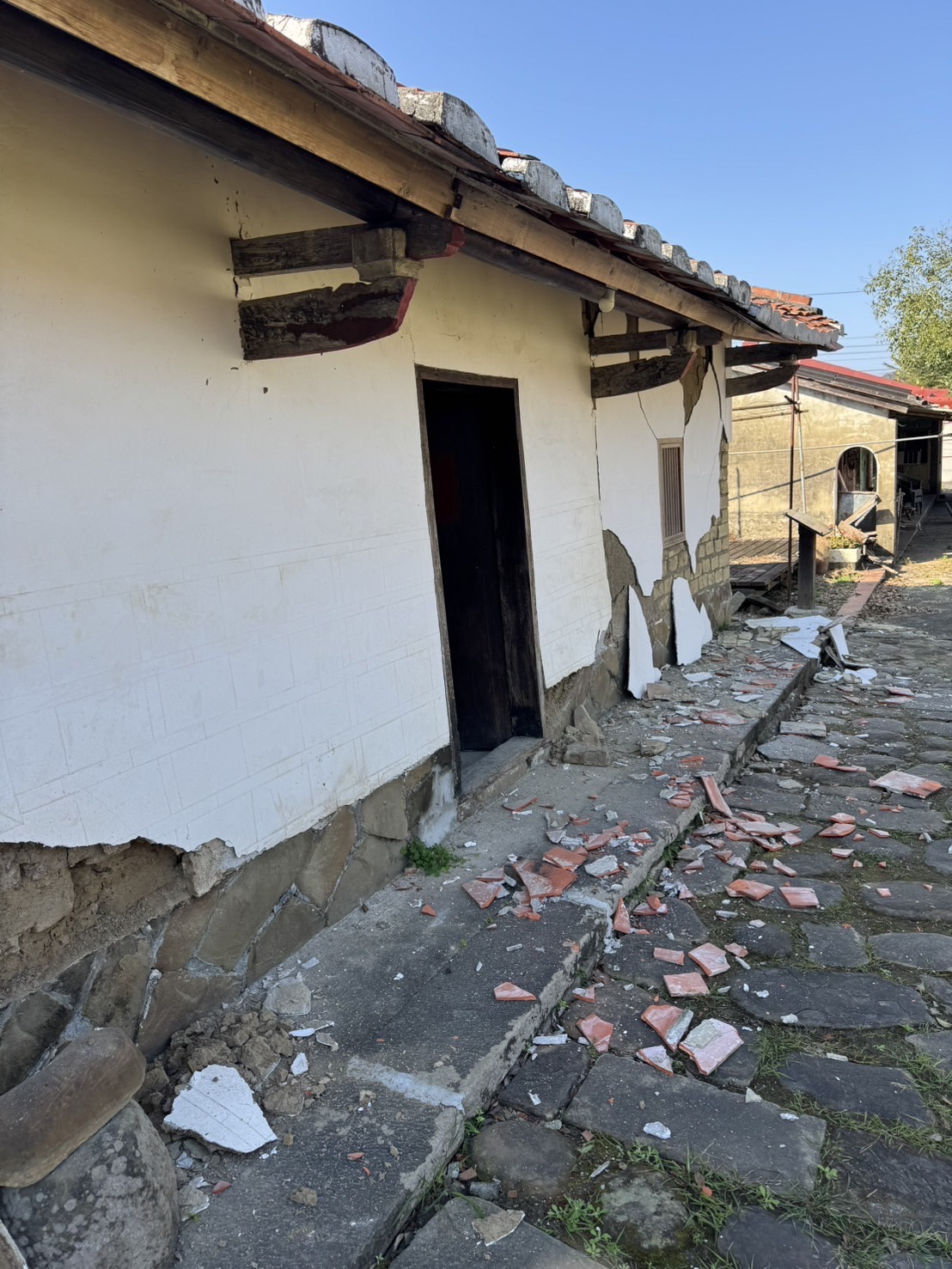
Damage to a home in Tainan, Taiwan

Date	Country and location	M_{w}	Depth (km)	MMI	Notes	Casualties	
Date	Country and location	M_{w}	Depth (km)	MMI	Notes	Dead	Injured
1	South Georgia and the South Sandwich Islands, South Sandwich Islands offshore	6.1	70.0	IV	-	-	-
2	China, Ningxia, 6 km (3.7 mi) NNW of Yinchuan	4.8	10.0	VIII	Six people injured, 7,599 buildings damaged and railway services disrupted in Yinchuan.	-	6
2	China, Inner Mongolia, 13 km (8.1 mi) SW of Nanliang Nongchang	4.8	10.0	VII	One building severely damaged, a balcony collapsed and several structures damaged in the Yinchuan area.	-	-
2	Chile, Antofagasta, 84 km (52 mi) NNW of Calama	6.1	99.0	V	Landslides and power and water outages occurred in the epicentral area.	-	-
3	Ethiopia, Afar, 45 km (28 mi) NNE of Awash	5.5	10.0	IX	Further information: 2024–25 Ethiopian earthquakes	2	Several
4	Ethiopia, Afar, 52 km (32 mi) N of Awash	5.7	8.0	VIII	Further information: 2024–25 Ethiopian earthquakes	2	Several
5	El Salvador, La Paz offshore, 56 km (35 mi) SSE of La Libertad	6.2	46.0	VI	Two people injured, more than 10 homes and several buildings damaged and landslides in the San Salvador-Usulután area.	-	2
5	Nicaragua, Madriz, 9 km (5.6 mi) SSW of Somoto	4.2	6.0	-	One home collapsed and 18 structures damaged in Somoto.	-	-
6	Iran, Fars, 77 km (48 mi) SSW of Firuzabad	5.2	10.0	VI	At least 200 homes destroyed and 300 others damaged in Farashband County.	-	-
7	China, Tibet Autonomous Region, 88 km (55 mi) NE of Lobuche, Nepal	7.1	10.0	IX	Further information: 2025 Tibet earthquake	126–400	351
7	Indonesia, East Nusa Tenggara offshore, 38 km (24 mi) NNW of Komodo	5.0	10.0	V	One home collapsed in the Bima area.	-	-
9	South Africa, Gauteng, 16 km (9.9 mi) SW of Carletonville	3.1	10.0	-	One person killed and 20 others injured by a rockfall in a mine in the Carletonville area.	1	20
12	Mexico, Michoacán, 18 km (11 mi) SE of Aquila	6.2	39.0	VI	Two people injured by wall collapses in Chinicuila. More than 25 homes and several buildings damaged in the Apatzingán-Coalcomán-Tamazula de Gordiano area. Landslides blocked a road between Colima and Manzanillo.	-	2
13	Ecuador, Guayas, 16 km (9.9 mi) SE of Eloy Alfaro	5.0	90.6	V	One person injured and one home collapsed in El Guabo. More than 141 structures damaged in the Guayaquil area.	-	1
13	Japan, Miyazaki offshore, 15 km (9.3 mi) SE of Miyazaki	6.8	39.0	VI	Four people injured in the Aira-Miyazaki-Saiki area. Two buildings, water pipes and roads damaged and a 20 cm (7.9 in) tsunami observed in Miyazaki Prefecture.	-	4
13	China, Tibet Autonomous Region, 70 km (43 mi) NE of Lobuche, Nepal	5.0	10.0	VI	Aftershocks of the 7.1 event on January 7. Several homes destroyed in Tingri County.	-	-
13	China, Tibet Autonomous Region, 83 km (52 mi) NE of Lobuche, Nepal	5.1	10.0	V	Aftershocks of the 7.1 event on January 7. Several homes destroyed in Tingri County.	-	-
13	Iran, Fars, 73 km (45 mi) NW of Mohr	4.6	10.0	V	Several homes damaged or destroyed in ten villages in the Dehram area.	-	-
14	Indonesia, West Nusa Tenggara, 39 km (24 mi) SSE of Dompu	4.7	10.5	IV	One home severely damaged in Bima.	-	-
16	Indonesia, East Java, 37 km (23 mi) SSE of Jember	3.2	16.0	-	One home destroyed and several others damaged in Jember Regency.	-	-
17	Indonesia, West Java, 20 km (12 mi) ESE of Palabuhanratu	4.3	75.7	IV	One home collapsed and several others damaged in Sukabumi Regency.	-	-
19	Portugal, Azores, 4 km (2.5 mi) NNW of Ribeirinha	4.6	10.0	VI	Several walls collapsed and several homes damaged in Terceira.	-	-
20	Taiwan, Tainan, 10 km (6.2 mi) NE of Yujing	6.0	16.0	VI	Further information: 2025 Tainan–Chiayi earthquake	-	50
22	Philippines, Eastern Visayas, 3 km (1.9 mi) NNW of San Francisco	5.7	9.0	VII	Thirty-one people injured, 25 homes destroyed and 1,421 others damaged in Southern Leyte. One road damaged and landslides occurred in the Liloan-San Francisco-Saint Bernard area.	-	31
23	Philippines, Zamboanga Peninsula, 8 km (5.0 mi) E of Siocon	5.4	62.0	IV	Fifteen students injured, 48 structures including Zamboanga International Airport damaged and power outages in the Siocon-Zamboanga City area.	-	15
24	Indonesia, Southeast Sulawesi, 78 km (48 mi) W of Kendari	4.8	10.0	VI	One home destroyed in East Kolaka Regency and one hospital damaged in Kolaka Regency.	-	-
25	Taiwan, Tainan, 14 km (8.7 mi) NNW of Yujing	5.1	10.0	VI	Aftershock of the 6.0 event on January 20. One person injured in Nansi, the walls of several homes and a school collapsed, many others damaged and power outages in the Dongshan area.	-	1
25	Taiwan, Tainan, 2 km (1.2 mi) SW of Yujing	5.2	10.0	VI	Aftershock of the 6.0 event on January 20. One home destroyed in Nansi; at least 10 others and a school damaged and power outages in the Dongshan area.	-	-
27	Poland, Silesian Voivodeship, 1 km (0.62 mi) NE of Radlin	3.2	5.0	-	One person killed and 11 others injured at a mine in the Radlin area.	1	11
29	Indonesia, Southeast Sulawesi, 71 km (44 mi) W of Kendari	5.0	10.1	VII	Three homes destroyed and 169 structures damaged in East Kolaka Regency.	-	-
30	Taiwan, Tainan, 12 km (7.5 mi) ENE of Yujing	5.1	10.0	V	Aftershock of the 6.0 event on January 20. Part of the façade of a building collapsed and damaged two cars in Tainan.	-	-
31	Ecuador, Napo, 32 km (20 mi) W of Archidona	5.5	8.0	VI	Three people hospitalized, four structures damaged and power outages in the Quito-Tena-El Chaco-Quijos area.	-	3

=== February ===
February
- Strongest: 7.6 M_{w} Honduras
- Total fatalities: 0

Number by magnitude
- 9.0+: 0
- 8.0–8.9: 0
- 7.0–7.9: 1
- 6.0–6.9: 2
- 5.0–5.9: 126
- 4.0–4.9: 1,265

Date	Country and location	M_{w}	Depth (km)	MMI	Notes	Casualties	
Date	Country and location	M_{w}	Depth (km)	MMI	Notes	Dead	Injured
3	Tunisia, Sidi Bouzid, 20 km (12 mi) W of Mezzouna	4.7	10.0	VII	Three people injured, the roof of a factory collapsed and five structures damaged in Meknassy.	-	3
4	Greece, South Aegean offshore, 21 km (13 mi) NE of Fira	5.3	13.5	VII	Strongest event of an earthquake swarm. One shelter destroyed, some older buildings damaged and rockfalls in Santorini.	-	-
8	Honduras, Swan Islands offshore, 210 km (130 mi) SSW of George Town, Cayman Islands	7.6	14.3	V	Some buildings cracked and power outages in parts of Honduras and Belize. A 3-centimetre-high (1.2 in) tsunami observed at Isla Mujeres, Mexico.	-	-
11	Croatia, Zadar, 5 km (3.1 mi) NE of Starigrad	4.6	10.0	V	Some people injured, numerous homes and three churches damaged in the Posedarje-Vinjerac-Pag area.	-	Some
23	Solomon Islands, Temotu offshore, 85 km (53 mi) SE of Lata	6.0	36.0	V	-	-	-
25	Indonesia, North Sulawesi offshore, 45 km (28 mi) E of Modisi	6.1	21.7	VI	Eleven homes and a church damaged in East Bolaang Mongondow Regency.	-	-
27	Poland, Lower Silesia, 2 km (1.2 mi) SE of Polkowice	4.7	2.5	V	One person injured at a mine in Polkowice.	-	1
27	Nepal, Bagmati, 11 km (6.8 mi) SSW of Kodari	5.0	10.0	VI	Six people injured in the Sindhupalchowk-Dhading-Kathmandu area; two homes destroyed and five others damaged in Sankhuwasabha; one home destroyed, three others, a barn and a police station damaged in Sindhupalchowk District.	-	6

=== March ===
March
- Strongest: 7.7 M_{w} Myanmar
- Deadliest: 7.7 M_{w} Myanmar; 5,456 deaths
- Total fatalities: 5,457

Number by magnitude
- 9.0+: 0
- 8.0–8.9: 0
- 7.0–7.9: 2
- 6.0–6.9: 10
- 5.0–5.9: 103
- 4.0–4.9: 1,064

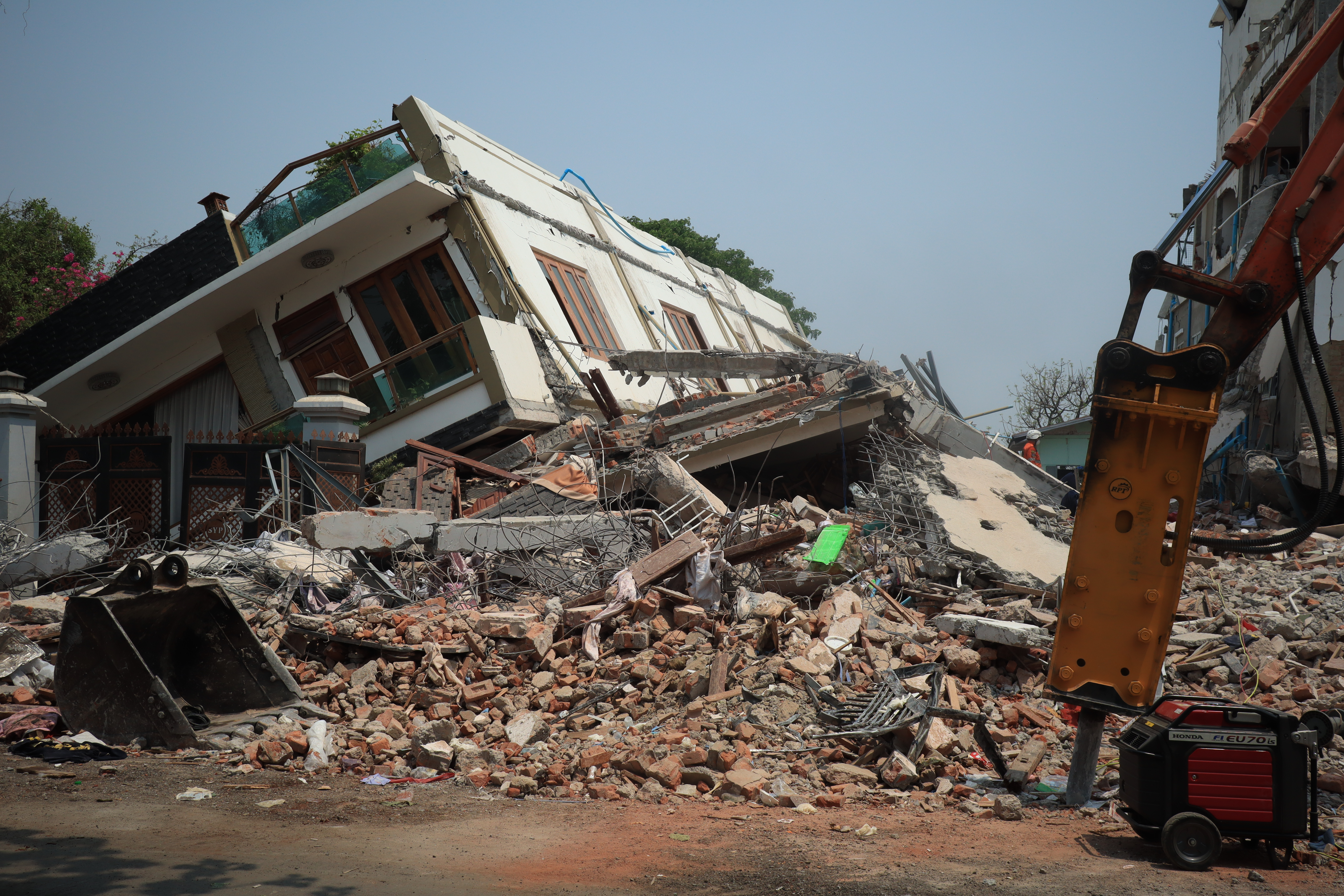
Collapsed building in Mandalay, Myanmar

Date	Country and location	M_{w}	Depth (km)	MMI	Notes	Casualties	
Date	Country and location	M_{w}	Depth (km)	MMI	Notes	Dead	Injured
4	Philippines, Davao, 7 km (4.3 mi) SW of Magsaysay	5.0	17.2	VI	Ten students hospitalized and power outages in various areas of Davao del Sur.	-	10
4	Myanmar, Ayeyarwady, 15 km (9.3 mi) S of Nyaungdon	5.1	10.0	VI	Several homes, a monastery and a pagoda collapsed and several religious buildings damaged in the epicentral area.	-	-
6	Chile, Antofagasta, 98 km (61 mi) S of Calama, Chile	6.0	96.0	VI	Rockfalls occurred and power cables damaged at a mine in the epicentral area.	-	-
7	Indonesia, South Sulawesi, 78 km (48 mi) E of Masamba	5.0	10.0	VII	One mosque collapsed, two schools and one home damaged in East Luwu Regency.	-	-
7	Philippines, Soccsksargen, 0 km (0 mi) ENE of Banisilan	4.8	10.0	VI	Two people injured, more than 564 homes destroyed and 69 structures damaged in the Wao area.	-	2
8	Armenia, Lori, 3 km (1.9 mi) ENE of Sarahart	4.4	10.0	VI	One home collapsed and one building damaged in the Artik-Spitak area.	-	-
10	Norway, Svalbard and Jan Mayen offshore, 34 km (21 mi) NE of Olonkinbyen	6.5	10.0	VIII	-	-	-
11	Iraq, Dohuk, 37 km (23 mi) E of Çukurca, Turkey	4.6	10.0	VI	At least 20 homes destroyed and many others damaged in Yüksekova District, Turkey.	-	-
12	Kyrgyzstan, Osh, 4 km (2.5 mi) WNW of Osh	4.1	10.0	VI	One structure collapsed and 39 others damaged in Kara-Suu-Alay area.	-	-
12	India, Nicobar Islands offshore	6.0	23.0	IV	-	-	-
13	Italy, Campania offshore, 1 km (0.62 mi) S of Monte di Procida	4.2	8.0	V	Eleven people injured and many buildings including a church damaged in the Naples area.	-	11
13	India, Ladakh, 50 km (31 mi) SSW of Padam	5.1	10.0	V	The walls of many homes collapsed and many buildings damaged in the Kargil area.	-	-
14	Indonesia, West Java offshore, 64 km (40 mi) SW of Palabuhanratu	4.9	49.3	V	One home destroyed in Lebak Regency.	-	-
15	Mexico, Oaxaca, 5 km (3.1 mi) W of San Pedro Tidaá	5.6	62.0	IV	Four people injured and a gas leak occurred in Mexico City.	-	4
17	Indonesia, North Sumatra, 41 km (25 mi) ENE of Sibolga	5.4	46.9	V	One person killed, another person injured, two structures destroyed and two others buried by a landslide, 18 structures damaged and landslides blocked roads in North Tapanuli Regency.	1	1
18	Chile, Coquimbo, 13 km (8.1 mi) SSE of Coquimbo	5.3	68.4	V	One building collapsed in La Serena and a sinkhole appeared in the Coquimbo area.	-	-
21	Peru, Arequipa, 2 km (1.2 mi) SE of Maca	4.6	10.0	V	At least 20 homes destroyed, 47 others and a church damaged and roads affected in the Achoma-Lari-Maca area.	-	-
21	Iran, Isfahan, 43 km (27 mi) W of Ardestān	4.8	10.0	VII	Several homes and a caravanserai collapsed and many buildings damaged in the Natanz area.	-	-
21	Panama, Chiriquí, 123 km (76 mi) SSE of Burica	6.2	10.0	V	At least 13 structures damaged in Chiriquí, Herrera, and Veraguas provinces.	-	-
21	United States, Alaska, 88 km (55 mi) SSE of Adak	6.2	17.0	IV	-	-	-
25	New Zealand, Southland offshore, 170 km (110 mi) WSW of Riverton	6.7	21.0	V	Minor damage to the Dunedin Gasworks Museum. A tsunami with a height of 10 cm (3.9 in) was observed in southwest Fiordland.	-	-
25	Indonesia, West Java offshore, 73 km (45 mi) SSW of Singaparna	4.6	64.8	IV	One home destroyed and nine others damaged in Cipatujah.	-	-
28	central Mid-Atlantic Ridge	6.1	10.0	V	Foreshock of the 6.6 earthquake 17 hours later.	-	-
28	Myanmar, Sagaing, 14 km (8.7 mi) NNW of Sagaing	7.7	10.0	X	Further information: 2025 Myanmar earthquake	5,456	11,404
28	Myanmar, Mandalay, 18 km (11 mi) WNW of Kyaukse	6.7	10.0	IX	Aftershock of the 2025 Myanmar earthquake 12 minutes prior. Additional damage to buildings in Mandalay and Sagaing.	-	-
28	central Mid-Atlantic Ridge	6.6	12.3	VI	-	-	-
30	Indonesia, Aceh, 5 km (3.1 mi) SSE of Banda Aceh	5.1	10.0	V	One person injured in Banda Aceh.	-	1
30	Tonga, Haʻapai offshore, 61 km (38 mi) SSE of Pangai	7.0	29.0	VI	A tsunami with a height of 5 cm (2.0 in) was observed in Alofi, Niue and 1 cm (0.39 in) in Nuku'alofa, Tonga.	-	-
30	Tonga, Haʻapai offshore, 72 km (45 mi) SSE of Pangai	6.2	17.0	IV	Aftershock of the 7.0 earthquake nearly three hours prior.	-	-
31	Myanmar, Sagaing, 9 km (5.6 mi) W of Mandalay	4.2	10.0	IV	Aftershock of the 2025 Myanmar earthquake. Several previously-weakened buildings collapsed in Mandalay.	-	-

=== April ===
April
- Strongest: 6.9 M_{w} Reykjanes Ridge; 6.9 M_{w} Papua New Guinea
- Deadliest: 5.8 M_{w} Tajikistan; 1 death 6.2 M_{w} Turkey; 1 death
- Total fatalities: 2

Number by magnitude
- 9.0+: 0
- 8.0–8.9: 0
- 7.0–7.9: 0
- 6.0–6.9: 12
- 5.0–5.9: 144
- 4.0–4.9: 1,161

Date	Country and location	M_{w}	Depth (km)	MMI	Notes	Casualties	
Date	Country and location	M_{w}	Depth (km)	MMI	Notes	Dead	Injured
2	Pacific-Antarctic Ridge	6.3	10.0	I	-	-	-
2	Japan, Kagoshima offshore, 56 km (35 mi) ENE of Nishinoomote	6.1	29.0	V	-	-	-
3	Reykjanes Ridge	6.9	10.0	III	-	-	-
4	Nepal, Karnali, 35 km (22 mi) SSW of Jumla	4.9	10.0	IV	Eight people injured, some homes destroyed and several others and government buildings damaged in the Jajarkot-Kalikot-West Rukum area.	-	8
4	Papua New Guinea, East New Britain offshore, 184 km (114 mi) ESE of Kimbe	6.9	9.0	VI	-	-	-
10	Indonesia, West Java, 4 km (2.5 mi) N of Caringin	3.8	10.0	V	One person injured, four homes destroyed, 35 others and several buildings including a school damaged in the Bogor area.	-	1
12	Papua New Guinea, New Ireland offshore, 104 km (65 mi) ESE of Kokopo	6.1	52.0	V	-	-	-
13	Myanmar, Mandalay, 41 km (25 mi) S of Kyaukse	5.3	10.0	VIII	Aftershock of the 2025 Myanmar earthquake. Several homes, buildings and a dam collapsed in the Mandalay-Tatkon area.	-	-
13	Tajikistan, Districts under Central Government Jurisdiction, 42 km (26 mi) ESE of Rasht	5.8	8.0	VIII	One person killed, 16 others injured, 348 structures destroyed and 361 others damaged in the Rasht-Tojikibod area.	1	16
13	South of the Fiji Islands	6.5	271.0	III	-	-	-
16	Southeast Indian Ridge	6.6	10.0	I	-	-	-
16	Mexico, Jalisco, 8 km (5.0 mi) E of Tuxpan	4.5	10.0	V	Several walls collapsed, one home destroyed, eight structures including a church damaged, landslides and ground cracks occurred in the El Poblado-Tuxpan area.	-	-
18	Japan, Nagano, 1 km (0.62 mi) ENE of Ōmachi	4.8	10.0	V	One person injured in Yamagata. A stonework collapsed, 10 homes and a temple damaged in Ōmachi. About 100 homes lost power in the Ogawa-Nagano area.	-	1
21	Iran, Fars, 51 km (32 mi) E of Nurabad	4.4	10.0	V	Four people injured and minor damage in the Ardakan area.	-	4
22	Indonesia, North Sulawesi offshore, 271 km (168 mi) SE of Pondaguitan, Philippines	6.2	104.0	IV	-	-	-
23	Turkey, Tekirdağ offshore, 24 km (15 mi) SE of Marmara Ereğlisi	6.2	12.7	VIII	Further information: 2025 Istanbul earthquake	1	359
25	Ecuador, Esmeraldas offshore, 19 km (12 mi) NE of Esmeraldas	6.3	18.0	VII	Forty-nine people injured, 254 homes collapsed, 1,150 others, 88 buildings, two bridges and 60 roads damaged, landslides and power outages affected 80% of households in Esmeraldas.	-	49
29	New Zealand, Southland offshore, 285 km (177 mi) SW of Bluff	6.2	10.6	IV	-	-	-
29	Australia, Macquarie Island offshore	6.8	19.0	IV	-	-	-
29	Poland, Silesia, 3 km (1.9 mi) WSW of Bytom	2.9	5.0	III	Two people injured in a mine in the Ruda Śląska area.	-	2

=== May ===
May
- Strongest: 7.4 M_{w} Chile
- Deadliest: 5.1 M_{w} Myanmar; 2 deaths
- Total fatalities: 3

Number by magnitude
- 9.0+: 0
- 8.0–8.9: 0
- 7.0–7.9: 1
- 6.0–6.9: 13
- 5.0–5.9: 129
- 4.0–4.9: 1,085

Date	Country and location	M_{w}	Depth (km)	MMI	Notes	Casualties	
Date	Country and location	M_{w}	Depth (km)	MMI	Notes	Dead	Injured
1	Iran, Razavi Khorasan, 46 km (29 mi) ESE of Torbat-e Heydarieh	4.8	10.0	VI	At least 29 people injured and some homes damaged in the Gonabad-Roshtkhar-Taybad-Torbat-e Heydarieh area.	-	29
1	Argentina, La Rioja, 52 km (32 mi) SSE of Tinogasta	5.4	11.0	VI	Some people hospitalized, many homes collapsed, numerous churches damaged, landslides, ground cracks and power outages in Famatina.	-	Some
2	Indonesia, West Sumatra, 17 km (11 mi) SSE of Bukittinggi	4.6	10.0	V	One person injured and four structures damaged in the Padang Panjang-Tanah Datar area.	-	1
2	Chile, Magallanes offshore, 222 km (138 mi) S of Ushuaia, Argentina	7.4	10.0	V	Tsunami waves caused serious damage at a nature reserve in Cape Virgenes, Argentina. A 14-centimetre-high (5.5 in) tsunami observed at Vernadsky Research Base, Antarctica.	-	-
2	Chile, Magallanes offshore, 289 km (180 mi) SSE of Ushuaia, Argentina	6.4	8.0	IV	Aftershock of the 7.4 event five hours earlier.	-	-
3	Turkey, Tekirdağ offshore, 27 km (17 mi) SE of Marmara Ereğlisi	3.7	10.0	II	Aftershock of the 2025 Istanbul earthquake. One person injured and one building partially collapsed in the Bahçelievler area.	-	1
3	Indonesia, Gorontalo, 158 km (98 mi) W of Gorontalo	5.9	92.0	IV	One person injured, several homes and buildings destroyed and one school damaged in the Pohuwato area. One utility pole fell in North Gorontalo Regency.	-	1
5	Southern East Pacific Rise	6.0	10.0	-	-	-	-
11	Indonesia, Aceh, 19 km (12 mi) ENE of Blangpidie	5.7	85.8	V	Two people injured, some homes and a road destroyed and six structures damaged in South Aceh and Southwest Aceh regencies.	-	2
11	China, Tibet Autonomous Region, 126 km (78 mi) W of Rikaze	5.5	9.0	VIII	Some homes collapsed in Lhatse County.	-	-
12	Mexico, Nuevo León, 13 km (8.1 mi) E of Ciudad General Terán	4.2	13.5	V	One home collapsed and 24 structures damaged in the Montemorelos area.	-	-
13	Italy, Campania, 3 km (1.9 mi) SW of Pozzuoli	4.0	10.0	IV	One building destroyed, several others damaged and landslides in the Pozzuoli area.	-	-
14	Greece, South Aegean offshore, 21 km (13 mi) SSE of Fry	6.0	74.0	VI	-	-	-
14	Tonga, Vavaʻu offshore, 142 km (88 mi) W of Neiafu	6.4	260.0	IV	-	-	-
15	Turkey, Konya, 14 km (8.7 mi) ENE of Kulu	5.0	10.0	VI	Seventeen people hospitalized, 26 homes and two mosques damaged in Kulu.	-	17
17	Peru, Ayacucho, 5 km (3.1 mi) W of San Pedro	5.9	101.0	VI	Some walls collapsed, 54 structures and some roads damaged, power, telephone, and internet outages occurred in the Caravelí-Lucanas area.	-	-
17	Myanmar, Mandalay, 22 km (14 mi) SSW of Kyaukse	5.1	10.0	VI	Aftershock of the 2025 Myanmar earthquake. Two people killed after a tree fell on a temporary tent in the Mandalay area.	2	-
18	Greece, Central Greece, 5 km (3.1 mi) E of Mantoudi	4.4	10.0	VI	Three homes severely damaged and 84 structures, including two schools and a museum damaged in the Mantoudi-Prokopi area.	-	-
19	Greece, Central Greece, 5 km (3.1 mi) ESE of Mantoudi	4.6	21.6	V	Three homes severely damaged and 84 structures, including two schools and a museum damaged in the Mantoudi-Prokopi area.	-	-
20	Papua New Guinea, East Sepik offshore, 89 km (55 mi) ENE of Angoram	6.5	16.8	VIII	-	-	-
20	Indonesia, West Java, 8 km (5.0 mi) NE of Sumedang Utara	3.4	10.0	-	One home collapsed and several buildings, including a mosque damaged in the Sumedang area.	-	-
21	Myanmar, Mandalay, 20 km (12 mi) NNE of Meiktila	3.4	10.0	II	Aftershock of the 2025 Myanmar earthquake. One previously damaged building collapsed in Mandalay.	-	-
22	Greece, Crete offshore, 66 km (41 mi) SE of Emporeío	6.2	64.0	VII	Several buildings damaged, some balconies collapsed and landslides occurred in the Heraklion area. Four exhibits in the Heraklion Archaeological Museum fell and broke.	-	-
22	Indonesia, Bengkulu offshore, 28 km (17 mi) SSW of Bengkulu	5.7	47.0	VI	One person died of a heart attack, two others injured, 46 homes destroyed and 362 structures damaged in the Bengkulu-Betungan area.	1	2
23	Australia offshore, west of Macquarie Island	6.1	10.0	-	-	-	-
25	Tonga, ʻEua offshore, 193 km (120 mi) SSW of ʻOhonua	6.0	48.0	III	-	-	-
27	Iran, Kohgiluyeh and Boyer-Ahmad, 12 km (7.5 mi) WNW of Dehdasht	5.1	10.0	IV	Two people injured and 1,000 homes damaged in Dehdasht.	-	2
27	Indonesia, Southeast Sulawesi, 38 km (24 mi) ESE of Katobu	4.5	10.0	VI	One child injured, some buildings and one home damaged in North Buton Regency.	-	1
30	Southwest of Africa	6.2	10.0	-	-	-	-
31	Japan, Hokkaido offshore, 78 km (48 mi) S of Kushiro	6.0	21.0	IV	-	-	-
31	New Zealand, Kermadec Islands offshore	6.1	10.0	III	An example of a triplet earthquake.	-	-
31	New Zealand, Kermadec Islands offshore	6.0	10.0	III	An example of a triplet earthquake.	-	-
31	New Zealand, Kermadec Islands offshore	6.3	10.0	III	An example of a triplet earthquake.	-	-

=== June ===
June
- Strongest: 6.6 M_{w} Scotia Sea
- Deadliest: 5.6 M_{w} Peru; 2 deaths
- Total fatalities: 4

Number by magnitude
- 9.0+: 0
- 8.0–8.9: 0
- 7.0–7.9: 0
- 6.0–6.9: 9
- 5.0–5.9: 109
- 4.0–4.9: 1,038

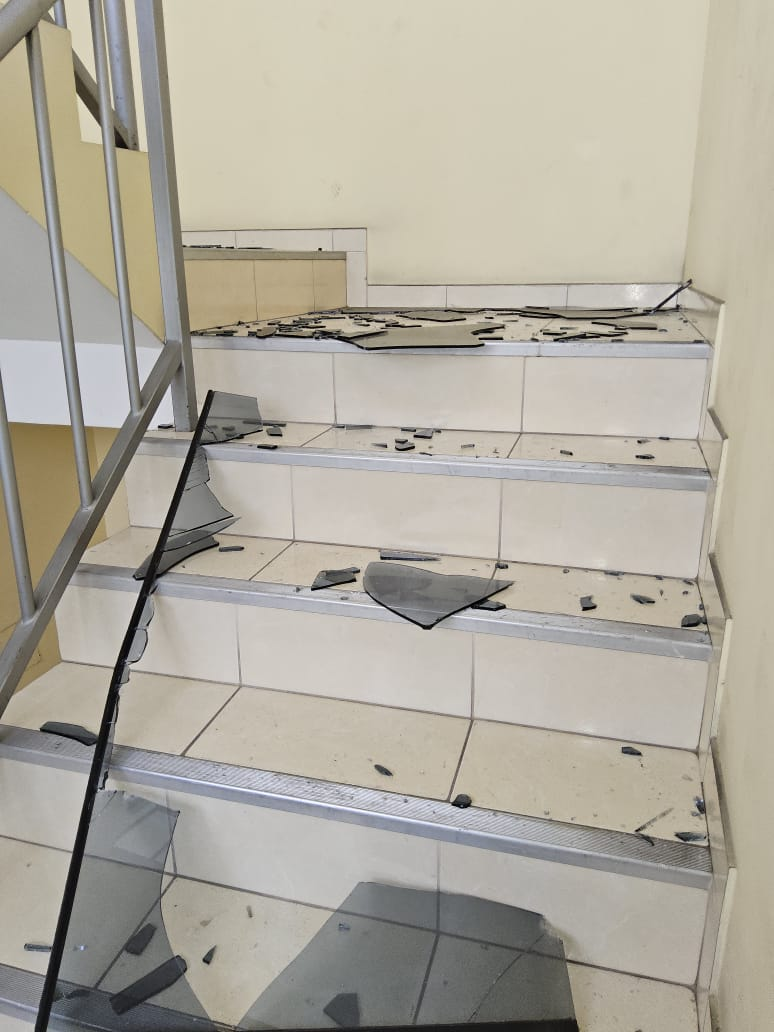
Building damage in Lima, Peru

Date	Country and location	M_{w}	Depth (km)	MMI	Notes	Casualties	
Date	Country and location	M_{w}	Depth (km)	MMI	Notes	Dead	Injured
1	Pakistan, Sindh, Karachi area	3.6	10.0	-	Strongest of an earthquake swarm. One person killed and 22 people injured. A wall at a prison in Malir District collapsed. Some homes damaged in the Karachi area.	1	22
2	Turkey, Muğla, 8 km (5.0 mi) SSW of İçmeler	5.8	72.0	VI	One person killed in Fethiye. Seventy-five others injured, some buildings and a mosque collapsed and numerous homes damaged in the Muğla area. Minor damage to buildings in Rhodes, Greece.	1	75
4	China, Yunnan, 22 km (14 mi) N of Zibihu	5.0	10.0	IV	At least 179 homes damaged or destroyed, one road collapsed and another road blocked by a landslide in Eryuan County.	-	-
4	Peru, Cusco, 12 km (7.4 mi) NW of Ccapi	3.6	15.0	III	At least 10 homes damaged in Yaurisque District.	-	-
5	Italy, Campania, Campi Flegrei	3.2	3.0	V	A portion of the Insula Meridionalis, in the Pompeii archeological park, collapsed.	-	-
6	Chile, Atacama, 46 km (29 mi) SW of Diego de Almagro	6.4	75.0	VII	Two people injured, one home destroyed, 246 structures and some roads damaged, four water mains ruptured, power outages occurred and landslides in the Chañaral-Copiapó-Diego de Almagro-Tierra Amarilla-Vallenar area.	-	2
7	Indonesia, Maluku offshore, 11 km (6.8 mi) N of Saparua	4.3	10.0	III	Foreshock of the 4.7 event on June 22. At least 315 homes damaged in three villages in West Seram Regency.	-	-
7	Greece, Mount Athos offshore, 6 km (3.7 mi) WNW of Karyes	5.4	10.1	VIII	One person injured and several monasteries damaged in the Karyes area.	-	1
7	Western Indian-Antarctic Ridge	6.2	10.0	-	-	-	-
8	Colombia, Cundinamarca, 15 km (9.3 mi) NE of Paratebueno	6.3	9.0	VIII	Further information: 2025 Cundinamarca earthquake	-	31
11	Peru, Lambayeque, 15 km (9.3 mi) WNW of Jayanca	5.0	72.5	IV	Several homes collapsed, 106 others and a school damaged in the Jayanca-Mochumí area.	-	-
13	Russia, Kuril Islands offshore	6.0	35.0	IV	-	-	-
15	Peru, Callao offshore, 37 km (23 mi) WSW of Callao	5.6	40.0	VI	Further information: 2025 Callao earthquake	2	135
20	Iran, Semnan, 40 km (25 mi) SW of Semnan	4.9	33.9	IV	Eleven people injured and some homes damaged in the Sorkheh area.	-	11
21	Japan, Hokkaido offshore, 82 km (51 mi) SE of Nemuro	6.0	18.0	V	-	-	-
22	Indonesia, Maluku offshore, 25 km (16 mi) WSW of Amahai	4.7	34.6	-	More than 431 homes damaged or destroyed in West Seram Regency.	-	-
23	Peru, Madre de Dios, 49 km (30 mi) SW of Manu	4.4	25.0	IV	Three schools damaged in Manu District.	-	-
24	Philippines, Davao offshore, 366 km (227 mi) E of Baculin	6.2	5.0	III	-	-	-
25	Southern Mid-Atlantic Ridge	6.2	10.0	-	-	-	-
27	Philippines, Davao offshore, 67 km (42 mi) E of Sarangani	6.0	99.7	V	Ten schools damaged and an overpass cracked in Davao City.	-	-
28	Scotia Sea	6.6	10.0	-	-	-	-
28	Pakistan, Balochistan, 56 km (35 mi) NNE of Barkhan	5.3	10.0	VI	Five people injured, 100 homes and a wall of a school collapsed and hundreds of structures damaged in the Barkhan-Musakhel area.	-	5

=== July ===
July
- Strongest: 8.8 M_{w} Russia
- Deadliest: 5.7 M_{w} Guatemala; 7 deaths
- Total fatalities: 19

Number by magnitude
- 9.0+: 0
- 8.0–8.9: 1
- 7.0–7.9: 3
- 6.0–6.9: 24
- 5.0–5.9: 385
- 4.0–4.9: 2,272

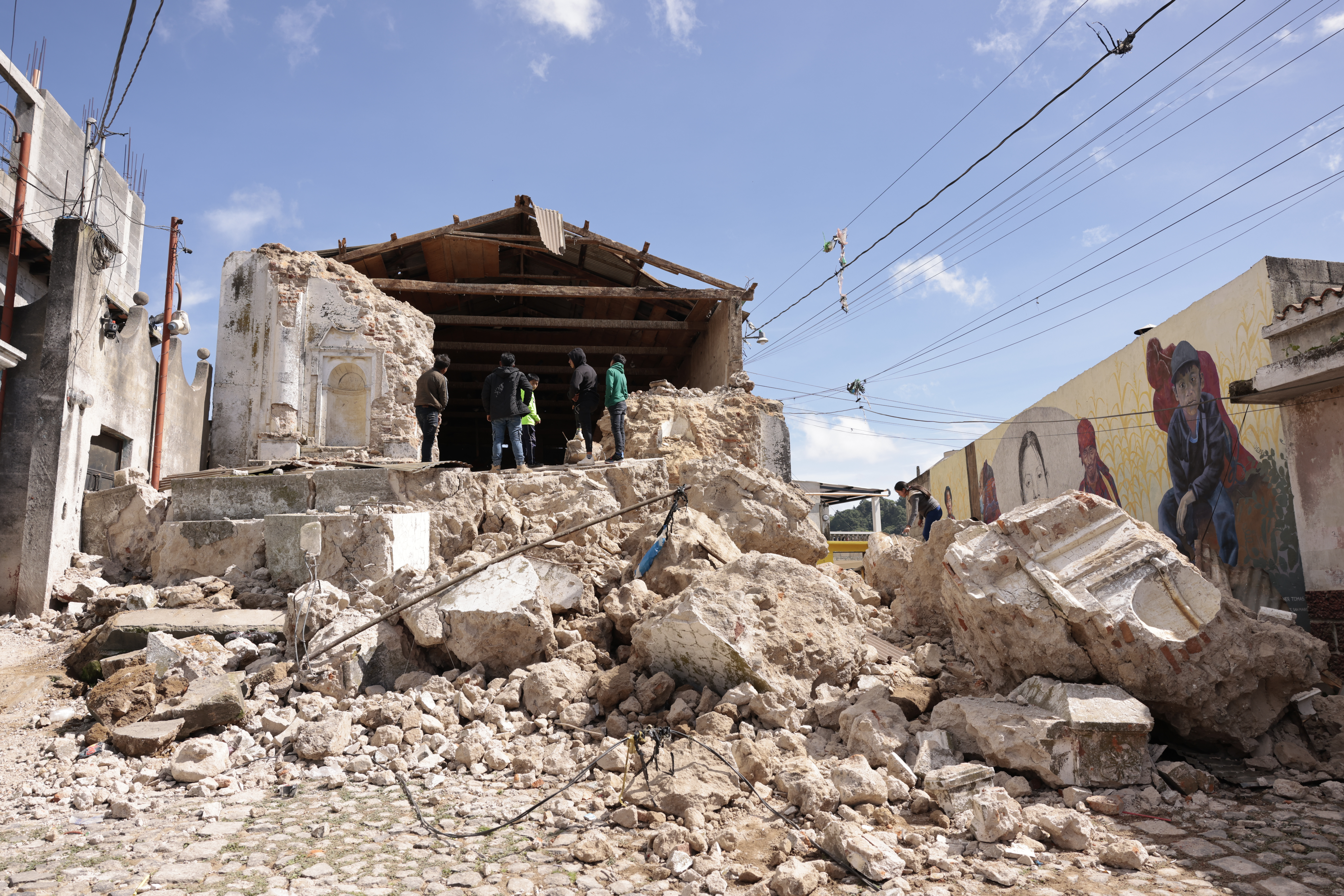
A collapsed church in Santa María de Jesús, Guatemala

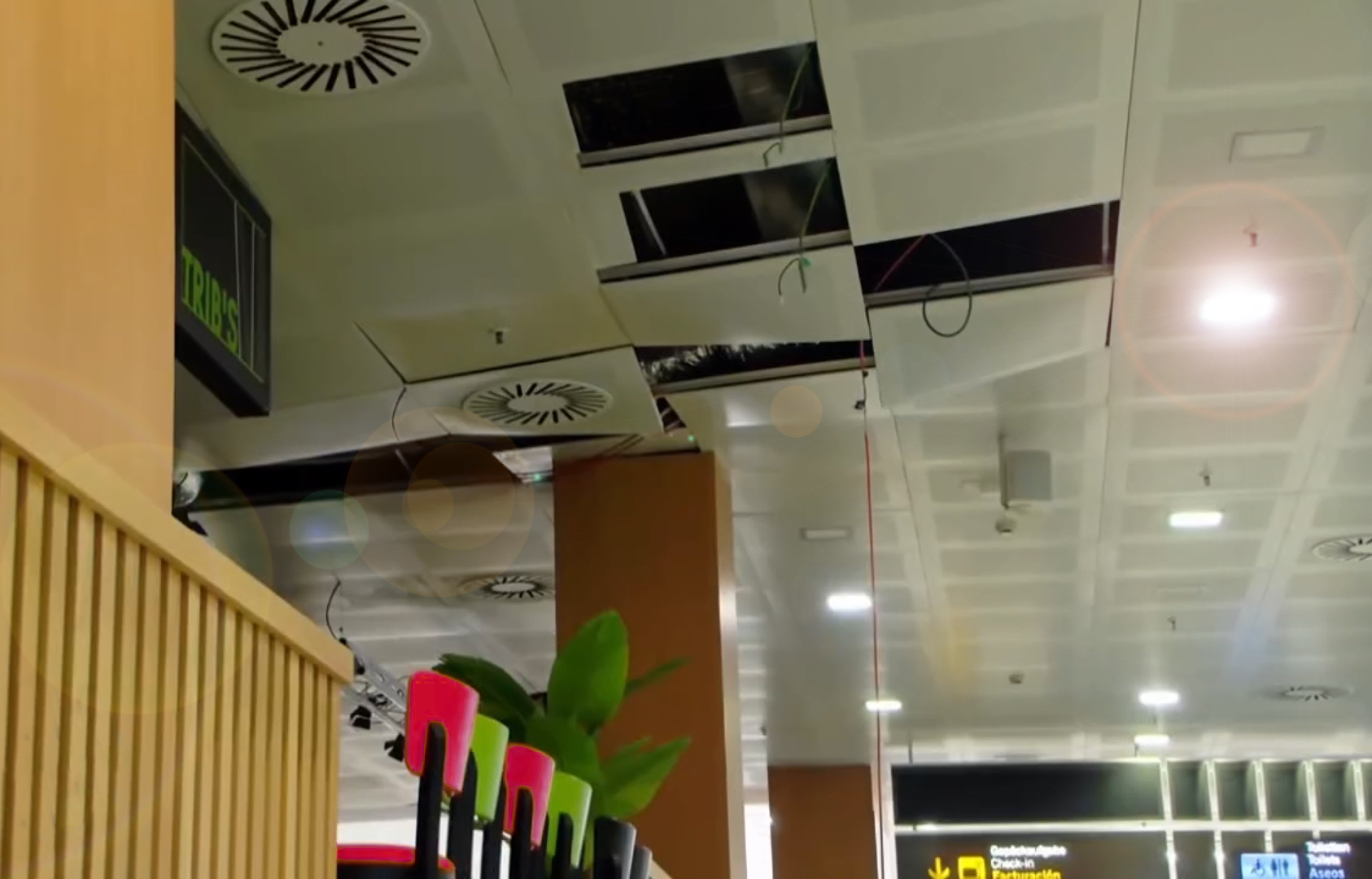
Damage to the roof of the airport of Almería, Spain.

Date	Country and location	M_{w}	Depth (km)	MMI	Notes	Casualties	
Date	Country and location	M_{w}	Depth (km)	MMI	Notes	Dead	Injured
2	Turkey, Bursa, 4 km (2.5 mi) NE of Gemlik	4.2	10.0	VI	Three people injured after the ceiling of a factory collapsed in the Serdivan area.	-	3
4	Indonesia, Maluku offshore, 22 km (14 mi) SW of Amahai	4.9	35.2	-	Two homes destroyed and 494 others damaged in West Seram Regency.	-	-
7	New Zealand, Southland offshore, 213 km (132 mi) WSW of Riverton	6.2	22.0	V	-	-	-
8	Guatemala, Guatemala, 3 km (1.9 mi) SSW of Amatitlán	5.7	10.0	VII	Further information: 2025 Guatemala earthquakes	7	300
10	India, Haryana, 7 km (4.3 mi) NNE of Jhajjar	4.5	10.0	VII	Two people killed and another person injured after a tree fell due to the shaking and struck two vehicles in Meerut. One wall collapsed and one school damaged in the Jhajjar area.	2	1
14	Spain, Andalusia offshore, 24 km (15 mi) E of San José	5.2	10.0	V	A roof collapsed at Almería Airport and the ceiling of an automobile showroom fell in Huércal de Almería.	-	-
14	Indonesia, Maluku offshore, 181 km (112 mi) WSW of Tual	6.7	79.0	VI	Some roads damaged in Southwest Maluku Regency. Several gardens and a road damaged, landslides occurred, and sand dunes as well as coral and gravel formations appeared along the coastline in the Tual area.	-	-
14	Indonesia, Central Sulawesi, 70 km (43 mi) NE of Masamba	5.0	10.0	-	Thirty-eight homes damaged in Poso Regency.	-	-
14	Panama, Veraguas offshore, 206 km (128 mi) S of Burica	6.2	10.0	IV	-	-	-
15	Myanmar, Mandalay, 13 km (8.1 mi) NNE of Mandalay	4.9	10.0	V	Aftershock of the 2025 Myanmar earthquake. One person died of shock in Kyaukse.	1	-
16	United States, Alaska offshore, 87 km (54 mi) S of Sand Point	7.3	38.0	VII	A 0.2 ft (6.1 cm) high tsunami observed at Sand Point.	-	-
17	Indonesia, East Java, 23 km (14 mi) NE of Lumajang	3.4	10.0	-	The wall of a home collapsed and at least 34 structures damaged in Probolinggo Regency.	-	-
20	Russia, Kamchatka offshore, 134 km (83 mi) E of Petropavlovsk-Kamchatsky	6.6	23.0	V	Foreshock of the 7.4 event 21 minutes later.	-	-
20	Russia, Kamchatka offshore, 145 km (90 mi) E of Petropavlovsk-Kamchatsky	7.4	34.0	VIII	Foreshock of the 2025 Kamchatka earthquake. Minor damage to some hospitals and clinics in the Petropavlovsk-Kamchatsky area. A tsunami with a maximum run-up of 1.53 m (5 ft 0 in) was recorded at the mouth of the Khalaktyrka River.	-	-
20	Russia, Kamchatka offshore, 153 km (95 mi) ESE of Petropavlovsk-Kamchatsky	6.6	10.0	V	Aftershocks of the 7.4 event less than an hour earlier.	-	-
20	Russia, Kamchatka offshore, 147 km (91 mi) E of Petropavlovsk-Kamchatsky	6.6	22.1	V	Aftershocks of the 7.4 event less than an hour earlier.	-	-
20	United States, Alaska offshore, 91 km (57 mi) SSE of Sand Point	6.2	40.0	V	Aftershock of the 7.3 event on July 16.	-	-
22	Russia, Kamchatka offshore, 154 km (96 mi) ESE of Petropavlovsk-Kamchatsky	6.0	12.3	IV	Aftershock of the 7.4 event on July 20.	-	-
22	Poland, Lower Silesian Voivodeship, 8 km (5.0 mi) SSW of Głogów	3.5	1.0	-	One person injured at the Polkowice-Sieroszowice mine.	-	1
23	Indonesia, Gorontalo offshore, 109 km (68 mi) W of Gorontalo	6.3	142.0	IV	-	-	-
24	Indonesia, Central Sulawesi, 69 km (43 mi) NNE of Masamba	5.6	10.0	VII	Four people injured, 106 homes, a kindergarten and a church damaged and power and telecommunication outages in Poso Regency.	-	4
24	Russia, Kamchatka offshore, 164 km (102 mi) E of Petropavlovsk-Kamchatsky	6.0	10.0	IV	Aftershock of the 7.4 event on July 20.	-	-
24	Tonga, Niua offshore, 187 km (116 mi) SSE of Mata Utu, Wallis and Futuna	6.6	314.2	IV	-	-	-
25	Australia offshore, west of Macquarie Island	6.2	10.0	-	Foreshocks of the 7.0 event on July 28.	-	-
26	Australia, Macquarie Island offshore	6.2	17.0	-	Foreshocks of the 7.0 event on July 28.	-	-
28	Burundi, Rumonge, 33 km (21 mi) NW of Rumonge	5.1	10.0	IV	Fourteen students injured due to a stampede at a school in Gicumbi District, Rwanda.	-	14
28	India, Andaman and Nicobar Islands offshore, 264 km (164 mi) WNW of Sabang, Indonesia	6.4	21.0	V	-	-	-
28	Australia, Macquarie Island offshore	7.0	31.0	IV	-	-	-
29	South of the Fiji Islands	6.6	553.0	II	-	-	-
29	Guatemala, Jutiapa, 6 km (3.7 mi) SE of Comapa	5.7	10.0	VII	Two people killed, 26 others injured, at least 1,386 homes, five public buildings, eight schools and a church damaged or destroyed and power outages occurred in the Comapa-Jutiapa area. One person injured, 66 homes destroyed, 375 others, two churches and a school damaged in the Ahuachapan-Chalchuapa area, El Salvador.	2	27
29	Russia, Kamchatka offshore, 119 km (74 mi) ESE of Petropavlovsk-Kamchatsky	8.8	35.0	IX	Further information: 2025 Kamchatka earthquake	1	25
29	Russia, Kamchatka offshore, 94 km (58 mi) SE of Petropavlovsk-Kamchatsky	6.3	16.4	V	Aftershocks of the 2025 Kamchatka earthquake.	-	-
29	Russia, Kamchatka offshore, 78 km (48 mi) SE of Petropavlovsk-Kamchatsky	6.1	25.4	V	Aftershocks of the 2025 Kamchatka earthquake.	-	-
29	Russia, Kamchatka offshore, 124 km (77 mi) ENE of Ozernovskiy	6.0	35.0	V	Aftershocks of the 2025 Kamchatka earthquake.	-	-
29	Russia, Kamchatka offshore, 165 km (103 mi) SSE of Vilyuchinsk	6.0	35.0	IV	Aftershocks of the 2025 Kamchatka earthquake.	-	-
30	Russia, Kamchatka offshore, 125 km (78 mi) SE of Petropavlovsk-Kamchatsky	6.9	36.6	VI	Aftershocks of the 2025 Kamchatka earthquake.	-	-
30	Russia, Kamchatka offshore, 126 km (78 mi) SE of Vilyuchinsk	6.2	35.0	IV	Aftershocks of the 2025 Kamchatka earthquake.	-	-
30	Russia, Kamchatka offshore, 183 km (114 mi) SE of Vilyuchinsk	6.1	10.4	IV	Aftershocks of the 2025 Kamchatka earthquake.	-	-
31	Russia, Kamchatka offshore, 138 km (86 mi) SE of Severo-Kurilsk	6.0	35.0	IV	Aftershocks of the 2025 Kamchatka earthquake.	-	-
31	Russia, Kamchatka offshore, 221 km (137 mi) SE of Severo-Kurilsk	6.2	12.0	IV	Aftershocks of the 2025 Kamchatka earthquake.	-	-
31	Chile, O'Higgins, 28 km (17 mi) NE of Machalí	4.2	8.1	VI	Further information: 2025 El Teniente mining accident	6	9

=== August ===
August
- Strongest: 7.5 M_{w} Antarctica
- Deadliest: 6.0 M_{w} Afghanistan; 2,217 deaths
- Total fatalities: 2,222

Number by magnitude
- 9.0+: 0
- 8.0–8.9: 0
- 7.0–7.9: 1
- 6.0–6.9: 13
- 5.0–5.9: 206
- 4.0–4.9: 2,004

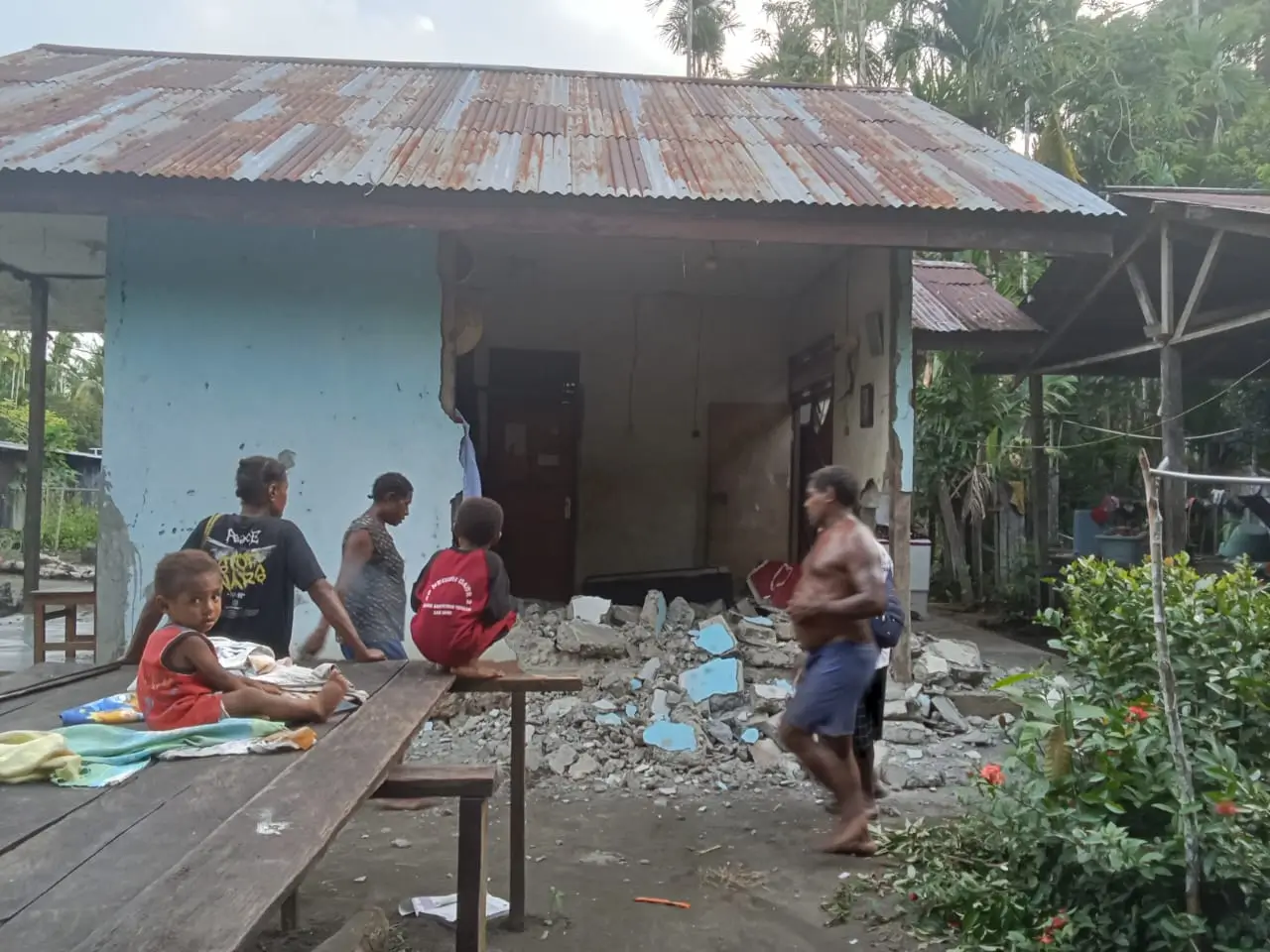
A severely damaged home in Sarmi, Indonesia

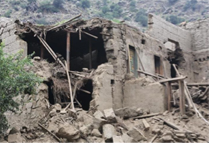
Destruction in Kunar Province, Afghanistan

Date	Country and location	M_{w}	Depth (km)	MMI	Notes	Casualties	
Date	Country and location	M_{w}	Depth (km)	MMI	Notes	Dead	Injured
1	Russia, Kamchatka offshore, 215 km (134 mi) ESE of Severo-Kurilsk	6.1	10.0	IV	Aftershocks of the 2025 Kamchatka earthquake.	-	-
2	Russia, Kamchatka offshore, 156 km (97 mi) SSE of Vilyuchinsk	6.0	45.7	IV	Aftershocks of the 2025 Kamchatka earthquake.	-	-
2	Mexico, Oaxaca, 3 km (1.9 mi) WSW of San Melchor Betaza	5.8	66.8	V	Two people injured, several buildings damaged and landslides occurred at a hill in the Oaxaca City-San Pablo Huitzo area.	-	2
3	Pacific–Antarctic Ridge	6.3	10.0	-	-	-	-
3	Russia, Kamchatka offshore, 123 km (76 mi) E of Severo-Kurilsk	6.8	30.0	VII	Aftershocks of the 2025 Kamchatka earthquake.	-	-
4	Russia, Kamchatka offshore, 209 km (130 mi) S of Severo-Kurilsk	6.2	10.0	IV	Aftershocks of the 2025 Kamchatka earthquake.	-	-
9	Russia, Kamchatka offshore, 267 km (166 mi) ESE of Severo-Kurilsk	6.0	10.0	IV	Aftershocks of the 2025 Kamchatka earthquake.	-	-
10	Turkey, Balıkesir, 8 km (5.0 mi) SSW of Bigadiç	6.1	10.0	IX	Further information: 2025 Balıkesir earthquakes	2	52
11	Poland, Silesian Voivodeship, 1 km (0.62 mi) SE of Wilcza	2.1	5.0	-	One person killed and eight others injured in the Szczygłowice Coal Mine.	1	8
12	Indonesia, Papua, 193 km (120 mi) WNW of Abepura	6.3	10.0	VIII	Some homes and the fence of a hospital collapsed and many structures damaged in Sarmi Regency.	-	-
14	Solomon Islands, Temotu offshore, 108 km (67 mi) SSE of Lata	6.3	31.0	V	-	-	-
16	Indonesia, Central Sulawesi, 12 km (7.5 mi) NNW of Poso	5.8	8.0	VI	Further information: 2025 Sulawesi earthquake	2	44
20	Indonesia, West Java, 22 km (14 mi) SSE of Cikarang	4.9	9.8	VI	A prayer room collapsed and 26 homes damaged in Bekasi Regency. Twenty-two homes and the roof of an office hall collapsed and 45 structures damaged in Karawang Regency. One home collapsed each in West Bandung, Purwakarta, and Bogor Regencies.	-	-
22	Antarctica offshore, Drake Passage	7.5	10.8	V	-	-	-
23	El Salvador, Sonsonate offshore, 81 km (50 mi) SW of Acajutla	6.0	10.0	V	-	-	-
23	Malaysia, Johor, 13 km (8.1 mi) ESE of Segamat	4.0	10.0	-	The ceiling of a mosque collapsed and at least three structures damaged in the Segamat area.	-	-
25	Russia, Sakhalin offshore, 313 km (194 mi) ESE of Severo-Kurilsk	6.1	10.0	-	Aftershock of the 2025 Kamchatka earthquake.	-	-
26	Poland, Silesian Voivodeship, 1 km (0.62 mi) ESE of Murcki	1.9	1.0	-	Three people injured at the Mysłowice-Wesoła Coal Mine.	-	3
27	Russia, Kamchatka offshore, 98 km (61 mi) E of Severo-Kurilsk	6.0	53.4	IV	Aftershock of the 2025 Kamchatka earthquake.	-	-
27	Taiwan, Yilan offshore, 17 km (11 mi) ENE of Yilan	5.3	116.0	V	The ceiling of a building of the National Taiwan Normal University in Taipei collapsed.	-	-
31	Afghanistan, Kunar, 37 km (23 mi) WSW of Asadabad	6.0	8.0	IX	Further information: 2025 Kunar earthquake	2,217	4,000

=== September ===
September
- Strongest: 7.8 M_{w} Russia
- Deadliest: 6.9 M_{w} Philippines; 79 deaths
- Total fatalities: 83

Number by magnitude
- 9.0+: 0
- 8.0–8.9: 0
- 7.0–7.9: 2
- 6.0–6.9: 9
- 5.0–5.9: 183
- 4.0–4.9: 1,406

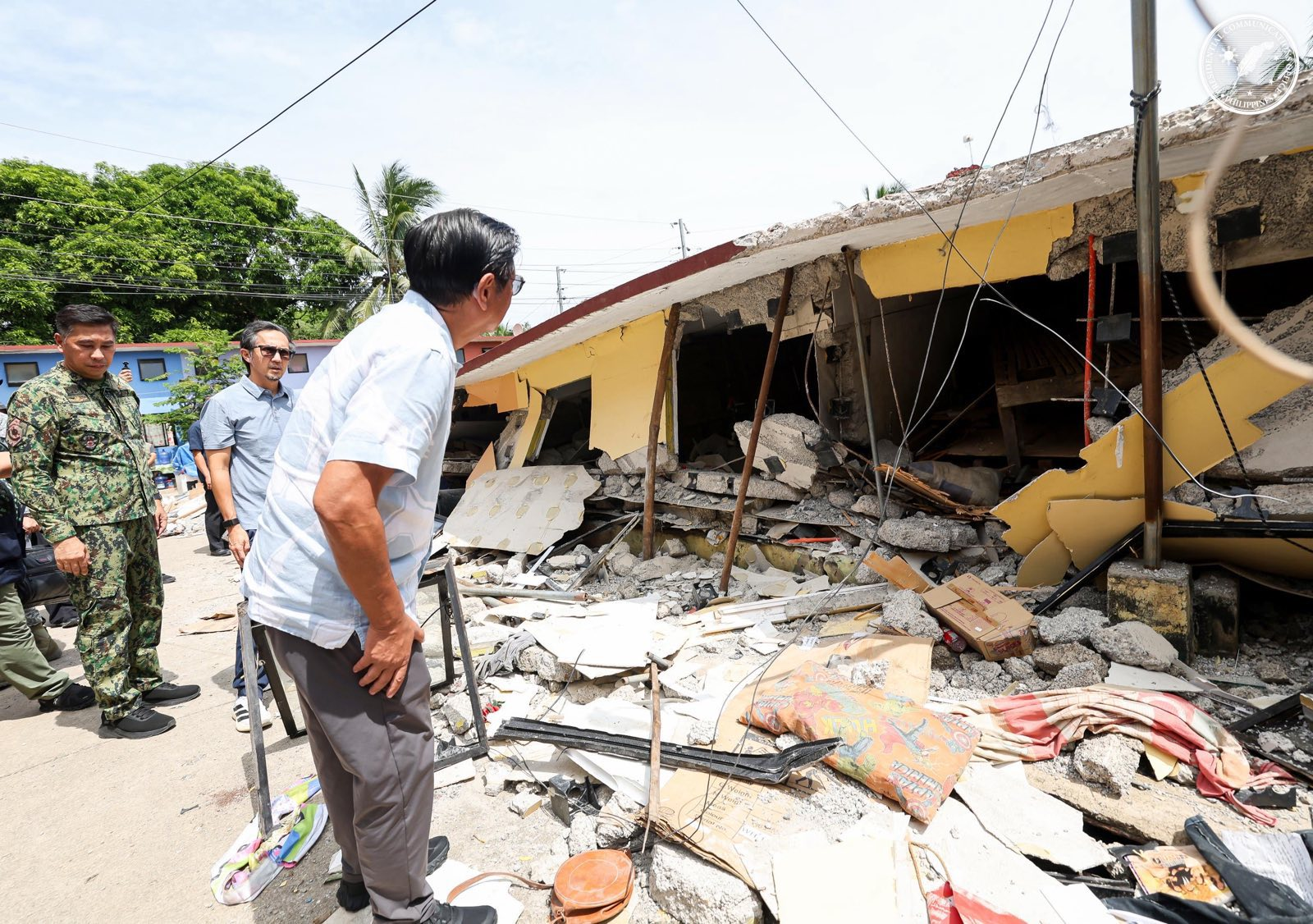
Philippine president Bongbong Marcos surveying a collapsed building in Cebu, Philippines

Date	Country and location	M_{w}	Depth (km)	MMI	Notes	Casualties	
Date	Country and location	M_{w}	Depth (km)	MMI	Notes	Dead	Injured
2	Mexico, Baja California Sur offshore, 9 km (5.6 mi) SSE of La Playa	4.8	10.0	V	The ceiling of Los Cabos International Airport collapsed and several homes and buildings damaged in the San José del Cabo area.	-	-
2	Afghanistan, Nangarhar, 34 km (21 mi) NE of Jalalabad	5.2	10.0	V	Aftershock of the 2025 Kunar earthquake. Many people injured, several previously damaged homes destroyed and rockslides occurred in the epicentral area.	-	Many
4	Afghanistan, Kunar, 36 km (22 mi) WSW of Asadabad	5.6	10.0	VIII	Aftershock of the 2025 Kunar earthquake. Two people killed, 51 others injured, 330 homes destroyed and additional landslides in Kunar, Laghman and Nangarhar Provinces.	2	51
7	Turkey, Balıkesir, 6 km (3.7 mi) SSW of Sındırgı	4.9	10.0	VI	Aftershock of the 2025 Balıkesir earthquakes. Two homes collapsed in the Sındırgı area.	-	-
8	Vanuatu region offshore	6.4	10.0	IV	-	-	-
12	Poland, Lower Silesia, 6 km (3.7 mi) SSE of Rudna	4.4	10.0	-	One person injured in the Rudna mine.	-	1
13	Russia, Kamchatka offshore, 111 km (69 mi) E of Petropavlovsk-Kamchatsky	7.4	39.5	VIII	Aftershock of the 2025 Kamchatka earthquake.	-	-
14	Colombia, Antioquia, 5 km (3.1 mi) N of Uramita	5.4	50.2	V	One person died while trying to repair their damaged roof, another injured, two homes destroyed and 233 structures damaged in the Frontino-Uramita area.	1	1
14	India, Assam, 10 km (6.2 mi) NNE of Khārupatia	5.5	29.0	VII	Two people injured by a roof collapse in Udalguri and many buildings damaged in Biswanath, Darrang, Hojai, Nalbari and Sonitpur districts.	-	2
15	Russia, Kamchatka offshore, 145 km (90 mi) ESE of Petropavlovsk-Kamchatsky	6.0	24.5	IV	Aftershock of the 2025 Kamchatka earthquake.	-	-
16	Papua New Guinea, Autonomous Region of Bougainville offshore, 207 km (129 mi) SE of Kokopo	6.0	63.3	IV	-	-	-
18	Indonesia, Central Papua, 26 km (16 mi) S of Nabire	6.0	28.0	VII	Thirteen people injured, two homes, one bridge and a church collapsed, 15 structures including the Douw Aturure Airport and another bridge damaged and power and telecommunication outages in Nabire Regency.	-	13
18	Russia, Kamchatka offshore, 138 km (86 mi) E of Petropavlovsk-Kamchatsky	7.8	27.0	VIII	Aftershock of the 2025 Kamchatka earthquake. At least four buildings and a swimming pool damaged in the Petropavlovsk-Kamchatsky area. Tsunami waves measuring up to 62 cm (2.03 ft) recorded near the Maly Semyachik volcano and 6 cm (0.2 ft) in the western Aleutian Islands region.	-	-
19	Russia, Kamchatka offshore, 98 km (61 mi) ESE of Ozernovskiy	6.0	58.3	V	Aftershock of the 2025 Kamchatka earthquake.	-	-
20	Indonesia, West Java, 31 km (19 mi) SW of Bogor	4.2	10.0	-	Some walls collapsed and 321 homes damaged in Sukabumi and Bogor regencies.	-	-
23	Afghanistan, Nangarhar, 23 km (14 mi) NE of Jalalabad	4.9	10.0	VII	Aftershock of the 2025 Kunar earthquake. Fifteen people injured, several homes damaged or destroyed and rockslides in Darai Nur District.	-	15
24	Venezuela, Zulia, 24 km (15 mi) ENE of Mene Grande	6.2	7.8	VIII	Further information: 2025 Zulia earthquakes	1	110
25	Venezuela, Trujillo, 27 km (17 mi) ENE of Mene Grande	6.3	14.0	VIII	Further information: 2025 Zulia earthquakes	1	110
25	Indonesia, East Java offshore, 24 km (15 mi) N of Wongsorejo	5.2	10.0	V	One person injured and one home collapsed in Jember. At least 110 structures damaged or destroyed in Situbondo Regency including seven posts at the Baluran National Park. Three homes collapsed and six others and a mosque damaged in Banyuwangi Regency. Two homes collapsed and another damaged in Bondowoso. Two buildings damaged in Jembrana, Bali.	-	1
26	Indonesia, Lampung, 96 km (60 mi) SW of Kotabumi	4.6	10.0	-	One home destroyed and 13 others damaged in Tanggamus Regency.	-	-
26	China, Gansu, 19 km (12 mi) NW of Hualin	5.2	10.0	VII	Eleven people injured, 17 homes destroyed and 4,328 others damaged in the Longxi-Zhang area.	-	11
28	Turkey, Kütahya, 18 km (11 mi) N of Simav	5.2	10.0	VII	Eight homes collapsed in Simav District and one building damaged in the Hisarcık area.	-	-
30	Philippines, Central Visayas offshore, 10 km (6.2 mi) east of Bateria	6.9	10.0	IX	Further information: 2025 Cebu earthquake	79	599
30	Indonesia, East Java offshore, 32 km (20 mi) SE of Kalianget	6.0	24.2	VII	Six people injured, 111 homes collapsed and 263 others damaged in Sumenep Regency. Eight buildings damaged in Pamekasan, Situbondo and Jember regencies. A madrasa collapsed in Probolinggo. Additional damage to the collapsed Al-Khoziny Islamic Boarding School in Sidoarjo Regency, hampering rescue efforts.	-	6

=== October ===
October
- Strongest: 7.6 M_{w} Antarctica
- Deadliest: 7.4 M_{w} Philippines; 10 deaths
- Total fatalities: 11

Number by magnitude
- 9.0+: 0
- 8.0–8.9: 0
- 7.0–7.9: 2
- 6.0–6.9: 14
- 5.0–5.9: 162
- 4.0–4.9: 1,331

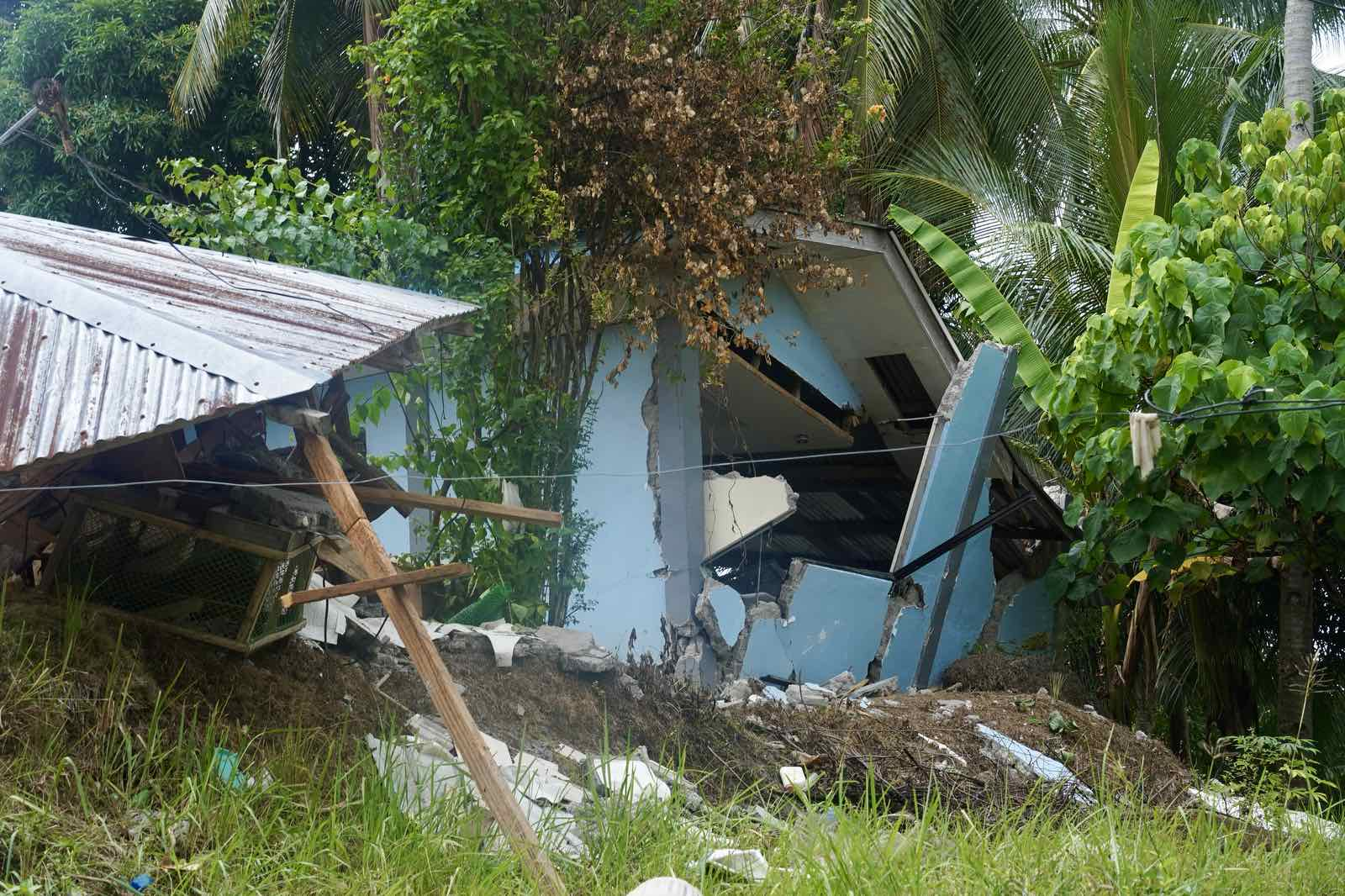
A collapsed home in Manay, Philippines

Date	Country and location	M_{w}	Depth (km)	MMI	Notes	Casualties	
Date	Country and location	M_{w}	Depth (km)	MMI	Notes	Dead	Injured
2	Turkey, Tekirdağ offshore, 24 km (15 mi) S of Marmara Ereğlisi	5.0	10.0	V	Seventeen people injured and four buildings damaged in the Istanbul area.	-	17
2	Iran, Isfahan, 79 km (49 mi) NE of Ardestan	5.1	10.0	V	Two homes destroyed and 181 structures damaged in the Zavareh area.	-	-
3	Russia, Kamchatka offshore, 177 km (110 mi) SE of Vilyuchinsk	6.1	19.0	IV	Aftershock of the 2025 Kamchatka earthquake.	-	-
5	Vietnam, Quảng Ngãi, 48 km (30 mi) S of Trà My	4.7	10.0	IV	Several roofs collapsed and 12 structures damaged in Kon Plông District.	-	-
7	Papua New Guinea, Morobe, 20 km (12 mi) W of Lae	6.6	103.9	VI	Some huts collapsed and power and internet outages occurred in the Lae area.	-	-
9	Philippines, Ilocos, 7 km (4.3 mi) NNW of Guiset East	4.7	10.0	-	At least 46 people hospitalized in Baguio and one bridge damaged in Rosario, La Union.	-	46
9	Russia, Kamchatka offshore, 120 km (75 mi) E of Ozernovskiy	6.1	63.7	VI	Aftershock of the 2025 Kamchatka earthquake.	-	-
10	Philippines, Davao offshore, 12 km (7.5 mi) E of Santiago	7.4	59.4	VII	Further information: 2025 Davao Oriental earthquakes	10	176
10	Papua New Guinea, Manus offshore, 139 km (86 mi) SE of Lorengau	6.3	10.0	V	-	-	-
10	Philippines, Davao offshore, 12 km (7.5 mi) SE of Santiago	6.7	47.0	VI	Further information: 2025 Davao Oriental earthquakes	-	-
10	Antarctica offshore, Drake Passage	7.6	6.5	IV	-	-	-
11	Philippines, Caraga offshore, 10 km (6.2 mi) ENE of Aras-asan	6.0	59.3	V	At least 344 homes damaged in the Cagwait-Marihatag area.	-	-
11	Ethiopia, Afar, 53 km (33 mi) NE of Mek'ele	5.6	10.0	VII	One person killed, nine others injured, at least five homes destroyed, 1,452 structures and 74 water wells damaged, and more than 43,400 people displaced in the Berhale-Dallol-Koneba-Mekelle area.	1	9
12	Philippines, Central Visayas, 3 km (1.9 mi) S of Lapaz	5.8	10.0	VII	Aftershock of the 2025 Cebu earthquake. Fourteen people injured, several previously damaged homes destroyed, one road damaged, landslides and power outages occurred in the Bogo-Daanbantayan-San Remigio-Sogod area.	-	14
16	Antarctica offshore, Drake Passage	6.3	10.0	I	-	-	-
16	Indonesia, Papua, 192 km (119 mi) WNW of Abepura	6.4	18.0	VII	At least 20 homes destroyed and 50 structures damaged in Sarmi Regency.	-	-
16	Philippines, Caraga, 3 km (1.9 mi) N of Union	6.0	32.0	VI	Two homes destroyed and 20 structures damaged in the Sison-Carrascal-San Benito-Socorro area.	-	-
17	Myanmar, Yangon, 6 km (3.7 mi) SSE of Yangon	3.9	7.0	-	Two people injured in North Okkalapa Township.	-	2
20	Dominican Republic, San José de Ocoa, 13 km (8.1 mi) N of Estebanía	5.0	10.0	V	At least twelve students hospitalized and one school damaged in the Sabana Larga area.	-	12
21	Iran, Fars, 47 km (29 mi) ENE of Nurabad	5.0	10.0	IV	Eight people injured and some homes and buildings damaged in Sepidan County.	-	8
22	Ecuador, El Oro, 16 km (9.9 mi) WNW of Piñas	5.5	73.6	V	Power outages occurred in Arenillas Canton. Two schools damaged in the Piura-Tumbes area, Peru.	-	-
22	Costa Rica, Puntarenas offshore, 7 km (4.3 mi) SSW of Quepos	5.9	31.0	V	The ceiling of a gas station collapsed and power outages occurred in the Jacó-Parrita-Quepos area.	-	-
25	Vanuatu, Torba offshore, 197 km (122 mi) SSE of Lata, Solomon Islands	6.0	54.4	IV	-	-	-
26	Indonesia, East Nusa Tenggara offshore, 59 km (37 mi) NW of Pante Makasar, East Timor	6.2	95.6	V	-	-	-
27	France, Guadeloupe offshore, 162 km (101 mi) E of Beauséjour	6.5	10.0	IV	-	-	-
27	Turkey, Balıkesir, 4 km (2.5 mi) ESE of Sındırgı	6.0	10.0	VIII	Further information: 2025 Balıkesir earthquakes	-	68
28	Turkey, Balıkesir, 11 km (6.8 mi) SSE of Sındırgı	4.9	10.0	II	Aftershock of the 2025 Balıkesir earthquakes. One previously-damaged building collapsed in Sındırgı.	-	-
28	Indonesia, Maluku offshore, 325 km (202 mi) WSW of Tual	6.4	143.6	IV	-	-	-

=== November ===
November
- Strongest: 6.8 M_{w} Japan
- Deadliest: 6.2 M_{w} Afghanistan; 31 deaths
- Total fatalities: 41

Number by magnitude
- 9.0+: 0
- 8.0–8.9: 0
- 7.0–7.9: 0
- 6.0–6.9: 9
- 5.0–5.9: 144
- 4.0–4.9: 1,142

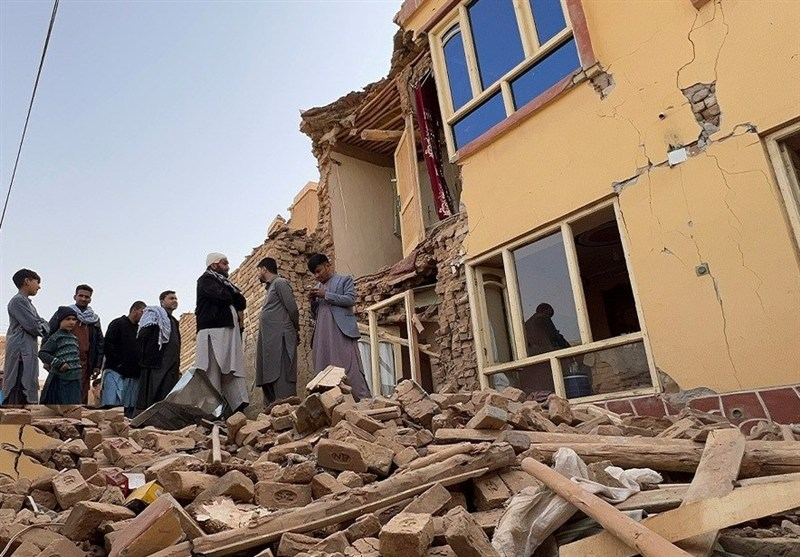
Damage to homes in Samangan Province, Afghanistan

Date	Country and location	M_{w}	Depth (km)	MMI	Notes	Casualties	
Date	Country and location	M_{w}	Depth (km)	MMI	Notes	Dead	Injured
2	Afghanistan, Balkh, 29 km (18 mi) SE of Mazār-e Sharīf	6.2	28.0	VII	Further information: 2025 Balkh earthquake	31	1,172
3	Russia, Kamchatka offshore, 151 km (94 mi) SE of Petropavlovsk-Kamchatsky	6.1	29.0	IV	Aftershock of the 2025 Kamchatka earthquake.	-	-
4	Guam offshore, 191 km (119 mi) WSW of Merizo Village	6.0	65.0	III	-	-	-
4	Russia, Kamchatka offshore, 149 km (93 mi) SE of Petropavlovsk-Kamchatsky	6.0	28.0	IV	Aftershock of the 2025 Kamchatka earthquake.	-	-
4	Indonesia, Gorontalo offshore, 70 km (43 mi) S of Gorontalo	5.9	120.3	IV	The walls and ceilings of a school collapsed in Banggai Regency, and some homes and buildings damaged in Bone Bolango.	-	-
5	Indonesia, North Kalimantan offshore, 13 km (8.1 mi) ESE of Tarakan	4.8	10.0	V	Two people injured, two homes destroyed and 22 structures, including Juwata Airport damaged in Tarakan.	-	2
7	Mexico, Baja California Sur offshore, 75 km (47 mi) NNE of Santa Rosalía	5.6	10.0	IV	The facade of a building collapsed in Guaymas.	-	-
7	Turkey, Hatay, 7 km (4.3 mi) W of Samankaya	3.6	39.6	-	One person injured due to panic in the Defne area.	-	1
8	Indonesia, North Kalimantan offshore, 21 km (13 mi) ENE of Tarakan	4.0	10.0	-	Aftershock of the 4.8 event on November 5. One home collapsed in the Tarakan area.	-	-
9	Japan, Iwate offshore, 126 km (78 mi) E of Yamada	6.8	10.0	V	A tsunami with heights of 20 cm (7.9 in) was observed in Kuji and Ōfunato and 10 cm (3.9 in) at Miyako.	-	-
9	Japan, Iwate offshore, 121 km (75 mi) E of Yamada	6.4	10.0	IV	Aftershocks of the 6.8 event.	-	-
10	Japan, Iwate offshore, 120 km (75 mi) E of Yamada	6.0	11.2	IV	Aftershocks of the 6.8 event.	-	-
12	Cyprus, Paphos, 2 km (1.2 mi) ESE of Konia	5.2	10.0	VI	One wall collapsed in Kelokedara, several homes and buildings including a monastery damaged, rockfalls and telecommunication outages occurred in Paphos District.	-	-
12	Cyprus, Paphos, 3 km (1.9 mi) SE of Meladeia	5.3	10.0	VI	One wall collapsed in Kelokedara, several homes and buildings including a monastery damaged, rockfalls and telecommunication outages occurred in Paphos District.	-	-
14	Netherlands, Groningen, 0 km (0 mi) ESE of Uithuizen	3.8	5.0	-	At least 1,077 homes damaged, 32 of them severely in the Groningen area.	-	-
19	Indonesia, West Java, 17 km (11 mi) SSE of Banjaran	3.3	10.0	-	One house collapsed and one hospital damaged in Bandung Regency.	-	-
21	Bangladesh, Dhaka, 14 km (8.7 mi) SSW of Narsingdi	5.4	27.0	VI	Main article: 2025 Bangladesh earthquake	10	629
22	Bangladesh, Dhaka, 11 km (6.8 mi) W of Narsingdi	4.3	10.0	V	Aftershock of the 2025 Bangladesh earthquake. Six students injured due to panic at Dhaka University.	-	6
24	Indonesia, Aceh, 31 km (19 mi) SSE of Bireun	4.6	10.0	-	The ceiling of a room in a university collapsed in Takengon.	-	-
25	Japan, Kumamoto, 13 km (8.1 mi) N of Aso	5.4	10.0	VII	One person injured and rockfalls occurred in the Aso-Ubuyama area.	-	1
27	Indonesia, Aceh, 45 km (28 mi) WNW of Sinabang	6.6	25.4	VII	Twelve people injured, several buildings and the roof of an office building collapsed, one mosque and a health center damaged and a warehouse caught fire in Simeulue Regency.	-	12
27	United States, Alaska, 12 km (7.5 mi) WNW of Susitna	6.0	69.4	VI	-	-	-

=== December ===
December
- Strongest: 7.6 M_{w} Japan
- Deadliest: 6.6 M_{w} Taiwan; 1 death
- Total fatalities: 1

Number by magnitude
- 9.0+: 0
- 8.0–8.9: 0
- 7.0–7.9: 2
- 6.0–6.9: 8
- 5.0–5.9: 148
- 4.0–4.9: 994

Date	Country and location	M_{w}	Depth (km)	MMI	Notes	Casualties	
Date	Country and location	M_{w}	Depth (km)	MMI	Notes	Dead	Injured
6	United States, Alaska, 90 km (56 mi) N of Yakutat	7.0	5.0	VIII	Landslides and avalanches occurred in the Kluane National Park and Reserve, Canada.	-	-
8	Japan, Aomori offshore, 73 km (45 mi) ENE of Misawa	7.6	45.5	VIII	Further information: 2025 Aomori earthquake	-	47
8	Japan, Hokkaido offshore, 129 km (80 mi) S of Honchō	6.0	22.1	IV	Aftershocks of the 2025 Aomori earthquake.	-	-
8	Japan, Aomori offshore, 125 km (78 mi) S of Honchō	6.6	10.0	V	Aftershocks of the 2025 Aomori earthquake.	-	-
12	Japan, Iwate offshore, 114 km (71 mi) ENE of Hachinohe	6.7	10.7	V	Aftershock of the 2025 Aomori earthquake. One person injured in Hiranai and tsunamis with heights of 20 cm (7.9 in) observed in Erimo and Hachinohe.	-	1
15	Turkey, Hatay, 3 km (1.9 mi) NNW of Antakya	4.0	10.0	-	One person injured due to panic in the Antakya area.	-	1
22	Papua New Guinea, Madang, 42 km (26 mi) NNE of Goroka	6.5	110.2	VI	-	-	-
24	Taiwan, Taitung offshore, 11 km (6.8 mi) NNE of Taitung City	6.0	10.0	VII	The ceilings of a school and a store collapsed, walls cracked at a prison and a fire occurred at a building in Taitung City.	-	-
27	Taiwan, Yilan offshore, 31 km (19 mi) ESE of Yilan City	6.6	67.5	VI	One person killed in Wugu District. Eight structures damaged and water and gas leaks in Taipei, the ceiling of the terminal of Taoyuan International Airport partially collapsed and one building and a road damaged in New Taipei.	1	-
28	Indonesia, West Sumatra offshore, 34 km (21 mi) NW of Bukittinggi	4.6	46.3	-	Ten homes destroyed and 41 others damaged in Agam Regency.	-	-
28	Indonesia, West Sumatra offshore, 43 km (27 mi) NW of Bukittinggi	4.6	58.5	-	Ten homes destroyed and 41 others damaged in Agam Regency.	-	-
28	Peru, La Libertad offshore, 36 km (22 mi) W of Puerto Santa	6.2	66.4	VI	Further information: 2025 Chimbote earthquake	-	53
31	Japan, Iwate offshore, 91 km (57 mi) E of Noda	6.0	19.3	IV	Aftershock of the 2025 Aomori earthquake.	-	-

== See also ==
- Lists of 21st-century earthquakes
- List of earthquakes 2021–present
- Lists of earthquakes by year
- Lists of earthquakes
