= 2025 Sulawesi earthquake =

Earthquake in Sulawesi, Indonesia

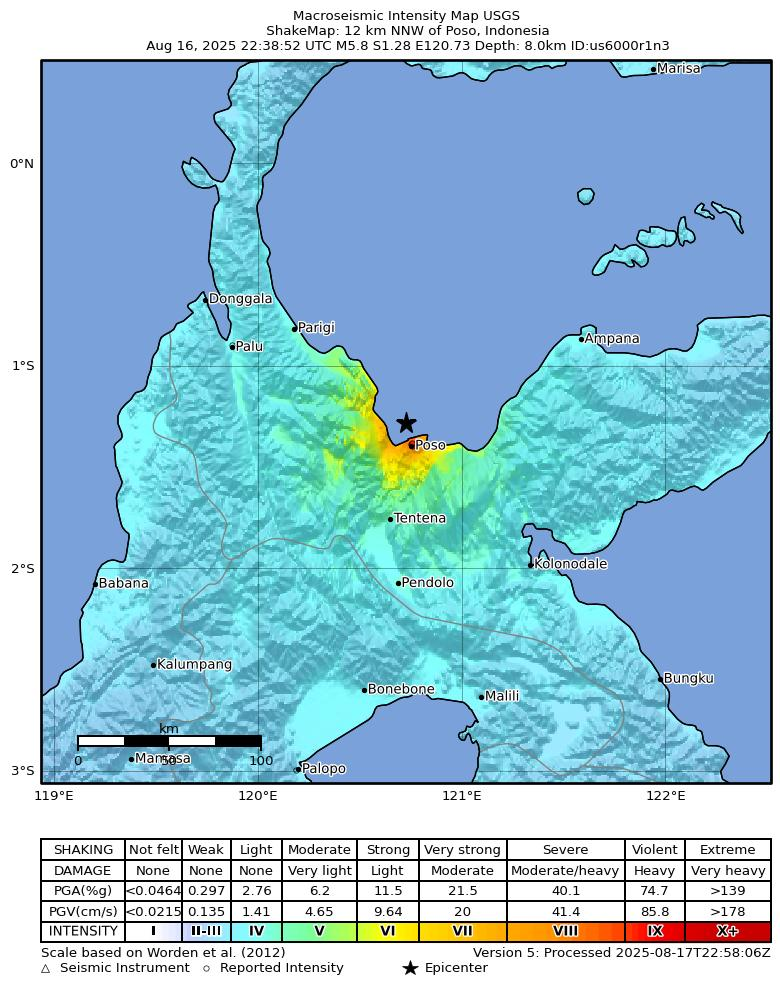
- USGS ShakeMap

- Location within Sulawesi Location within Indonesia
- UTC time: 2025-08-16 22:38:52
- ISC event: 643906636
- USGS-ANSS: ComCat
- Local date: 17 August 2025
- Local time: 06:38:52 WITA (UTC+8)
- Magnitude: M_{w} 5.8
- Depth: 8.0 km (5 mi)
- Epicenter: 1.282°S 120.727°E
- Fault: Tokararu Fault
- Type: Thrust
- Areas affected: Sulawesi, Indonesia
- Max. intensity: MMI VI (Strong)
- Tsunami: 4.8 cm (1.9 in)
- Casualties: 2 fatalities, 44 injuries

On 17 August 2025, at 06:38:52 WITA, a M_{ww} 5.8 earthquake struck the Indonesian province of Central Sulawesi about 12 km (7.5 mi) north northwest of the town of Poso. The earthquake killed two people and injured at least 44 others, collapsed a church, damaged homes and buildings and triggered a minor tsunami in Poso Regency.

== Tectonic setting ==
Sulawesi lies within the complex zone of interaction between the Australian, Pacific, Philippine, and Sunda plates in which many small microplates have developed. The main active structure onshore in the western part of Central Sulawesi is the left-lateral NNW–SSE Palu-Koro strike-slip fault that forms the boundary between the North Sula, and Makassar blocks and was responsible for the destructive Palu earthquake in 2018. According to the interpretation of Global Positioning System (GPS) data, the Makassar block is currently rotating anticlockwise, with its northwestern margin showing convergence with the Sunda block across the Makassar Strait.

The main structure in that part of Sulawesi is the offshore, north–south trending, moderately east-dipping Makassar Thrust, also known as the Majene Thrust. The GPS data also support the presence of a seismically "locked" fault in the Makassar Strait. Seismic reflection data from the Makassar Strait supports the presence of active thrusting west of the Makassar block. The Majene/Kalosi fold-and-thrust belt is exposed onshore between Majene and Mamuju. The northern part of the Makassar Strait is interpreted as a foreland basin, with its subsidence caused by the loading of this active thrust belt.

== Earthquake ==
The quake measured 5.8 M_{w}, and had an epicenter just off the coast of Poso Regency in Central Sulawesi province, or 12 km (7.5 mi) north northwest of its capital of the same name. It struck 8.0 km (5.0 mi) below the surface, and had a maximum Modified Mercalli intensity of VI (Strong) in Poso, IV (Light) in Luwu Timur, Mamuju, Masamba, Majene, Palopo, Polman, and Pasangkayu, and III (Weak) in Tana Toraja and Wajo. The quake was followed by 57 aftershocks as of 8:00 local time, and triggered a small tsunami with a height of 4.8 cm (1.9 in). The earthquake was caused by movement on the Tokararu Fault, a north-south trending thrust fault, confirmed by relocated aftershocks and InSar data.

In 14 July, one month prior to the 17 August quake and centered around 80 km (50 mi) south on Lake Poso, a magnitude 5.0 quake in the same regency damaged 38 houses, and ten days later a pair of M_{w} 5.5 and M_{w} 5.6 quakes injured four people, damaged 108 structures and caused power and telecommunication outages. These two earthquakes occurred only just over a minute apart. They have also been interpreted as a single event with a magnitude of M_{w} 5.9, involving strike-slip movement on the Poso Fault. The possibility that this earlier sequence triggered the 17 August earthquake by altering stresses around the Tokararu fault has been examined, but modelling does not support such a connection.

== Damage and casualties ==
Two people died and 44 others were injured, one of them in a critical condition, as a result of the earthquake. Both of the fatalities and 10 of the injured were congregants who were hit by fallen debris after a portion of a church under construction in the village of Masani collapsed on them while they were attending a Sunday service. At least 254 homes were affected, including 82 which suffered severe damage and 172 which were slightly damaged. In addition to the collapsed church, 14 other places of worship, including a mosque, 10 schools, a village office and a village health post were also damaged.

== See also ==
- List of earthquakes in 2025
- List of earthquakes in Indonesia
