= 2025 Balıkesir earthquakes =

Earthquake in Turkey

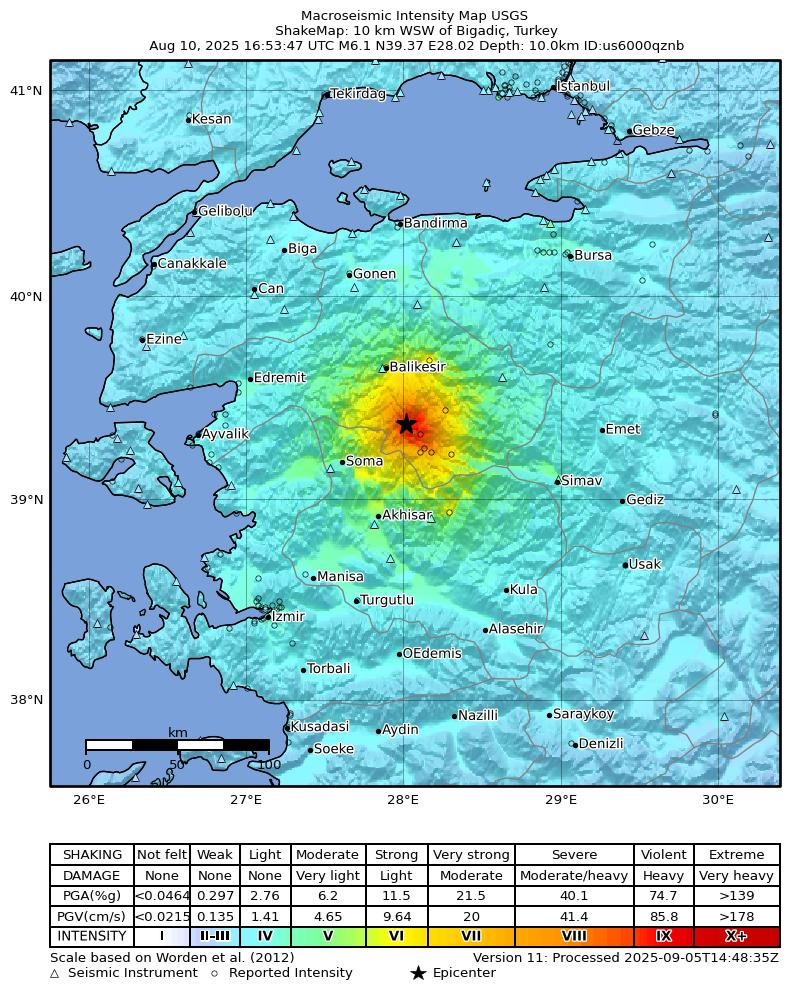
- USGS ShakeMap of the 10 August event

- Location within Turkey
- UTC time: 2025-08-10 16:53:47; 2025-10-27 19:48:29
- ISC event: 643895346; 644546402
- USGS-ANSS: ComCat; ComCat
- Local date: 10 August 2025; 27 October 2025
- Local time: 19:53:47 TRT (UTC+3); 22:48:29 TRT (UTC+3)
- Magnitude: M_{w} 6.1; M_{w} 6.0
- Depth: 9.4 km (5.8 mi); 8 km (5.0 mi)
- Epicenter: 39.312°N 28.069°E; 39.233°N 28.228°E
- Type: Normal; Oblique-normal
- Areas affected: Turkey
- Max. intensity: MMI IX (Violent)
- Aftershocks: 15,500+, including 51+ ≥M4.0
- Casualties: 1 dead, 52 injured (10 August); 68 injured (27 October)

On 10 August 2025 at 19:53 TRT, a M_{ww} 6.1 earthquake struck the Sındırgı district of Balıkesir, Turkey, 8 km (5.0 mi) south-southwest of Bigadiç. One person died and 52 others were injured as a result of the first event. On 27 October at 22:48 TRT, a M_{w} 6.0 event struck the same area, injuring 68 people.

== Tectonic setting ==
The western part of Anatolia forms part of the zone of active extensional tectonics that extends westwards through the Aegean Sea plate to the Gulf of Corinth. This extension is a result of the rollback of the African plate as it subducts beneath the Aegean Sea plate. Previous earthquakes in this area include a sequence of three destructive events during the 1969–1970 period, the 1969 Demirci earthquake, the 1969 Alaşehir earthquake and the 1970 Gediz earthquake.

== Earthquakes ==
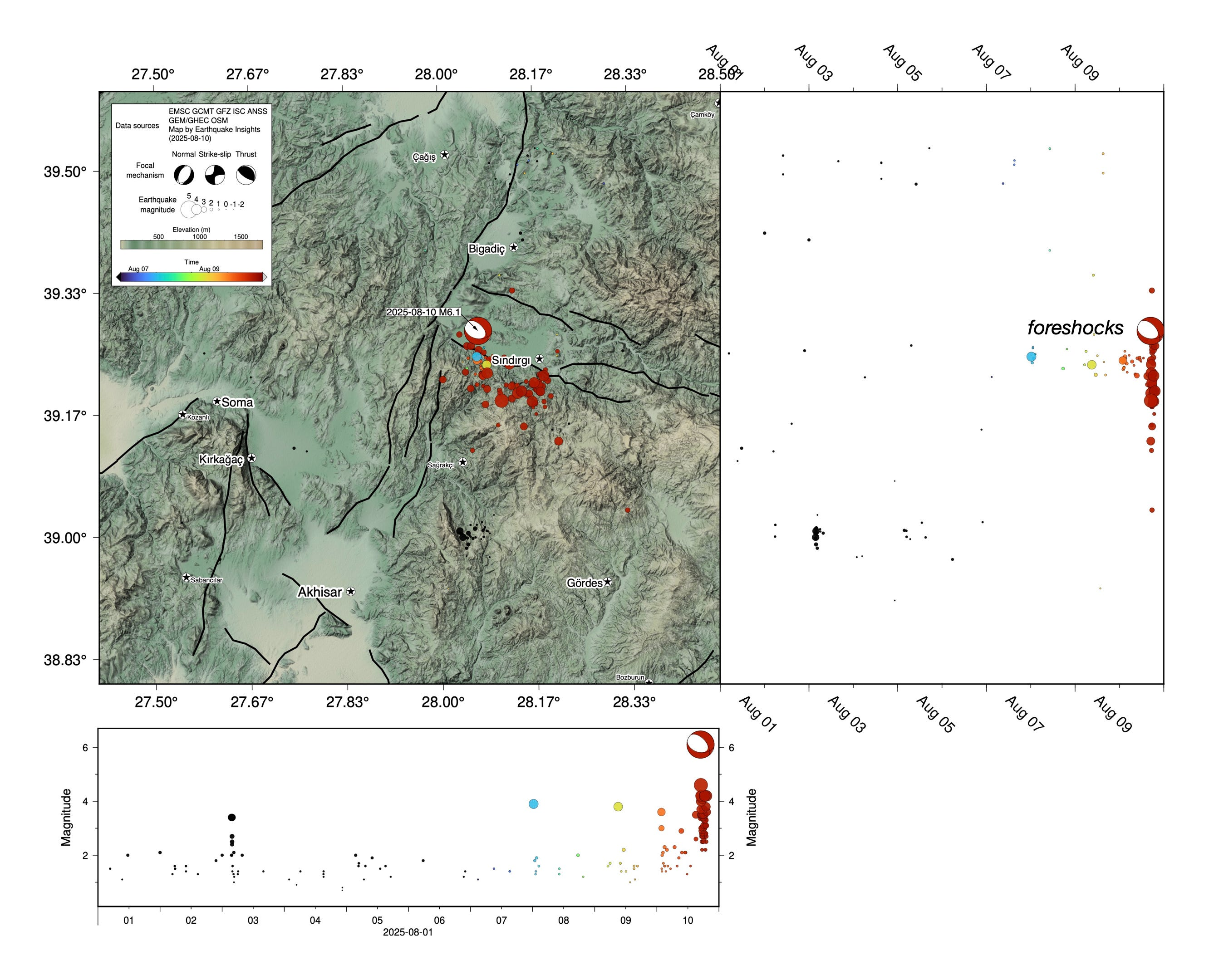
Seismic activity from 1-10 August 2025 around the M6.1 Balıkesir earthquake. The earthquakes are colored by time, projected to the right onto a timeline, and shown below the map as a time series. Several foreshocks are visible.

The United States Geological Survey (USGS) reported a magnitude of M_{ww} 6.1. Its epicenter was located 8 km (5.0 mi) south-southwest of Bigadiç in Balıkesir Province. The Kandilli Observatory said that the quake was centered near the districts of Alakır and Sındırgı, and occurred at a depth of 7.7 km (4.8 mi). The earthquake's epicenter lies close to the western end of the Simav fault zone, which is interpreted to be responsible for the 1969 Demirci event.

The earthquake shaking had a maximum Modified Mercalli intensity of IX (Violent), and was felt as far away as the cities of Istanbul, İzmir, Aydın, Eskişehir, and Tekirdağ and in the neighboring countries of Bulgaria, Cyprus, Greece, North Macedonia and Romania. By 13 August at 9:30 local time, 1,235 aftershocks were recorded of which 19 exceeded magnitude 4.0, and included a mb4.2 event at 17:15 UTC. On 24 August, at 18:58 UTC, a magnitude M_{w} 4.8 aftershock occurred.

The earthquake mainshock was preceded by a sequence of foreshocks, with three events of magnitude >3 during the previous three days.

A second large earthquake, measuring M_{ww} 6.0, struck 4 km (2.5 mi) east-southeast of Sındırgı on 27 October at 22:48:29 TRT, at a depth of 8 km (5.0 mi). It had a maximum Mercalli intensity of VIII (Severe). Within an hour of the mainshock, 26 aftershocks were reported, the largest measuring M_{w} 4.2.

== Impact ==
=== 10 August ===
A video of shaking from the August event

Two minarets were damaged or destroyed in Sındırgı. A three-story apartment block collapsed, 729 buildings were severely damaged and 61 were slightly damaged. Seventy-three mosques were also affected. An 82-year-old man died after he was rescued from a collapsed building. Fifty-two people were initially hospitalized due to injuries or panic. Eight houses were also damaged in Manisa. Most of the buildings that collapsed or suffered damage were uninhabited and abandoned. A sinkhole also appeared in a rural area near Odunpazarı in Eskişehir Province.

Around 1,100 search and rescue personnel and 50 damage assessment teams were deployed to the affected areas. The owner and contractor of the building in Sındırgı in which the fatality was recorded was taken into custody on suspicion of "causing death and injury by negligence".

=== 27 October ===
Twenty-six people were injured, five abandoned buildings and a shop collapsed, at least 80 structures were severely damaged and a collapsing wall damaged a vehicle in Sındırgı. Forty-two people were injured and 83 structures were damaged in Manisa Province. A house sustained cracks in walls and a collapsed ceiling in Gördes. Several aftershocks, the largest of which measured M_{w}4.8, caused a building heavily damaged by the 11 August quake to collapse partially. Schools were closed for one day. Public buildings were opened to temporarily shelter victims.

== See also ==
- List of earthquakes in 2025
- List of earthquakes in Turkey
- 1919 Ayvalık earthquake
- 1953 Yenice–Gönen earthquake
- 2025 Istanbul earthquake
