= Modisi =

Town in North Sulawesi, Indonesia

- Town
- Modisi
- Nickname: Modisi City
- Motto: Together with the People Building a Great Modisi
- Anthem: Indonesia Raya
- Peta Desa Modisi
- Coordinates (Modisi): 0°27′02.5″N 124°26′08.2″E
- Country: Indonesia
- State: North Sulawesi
- County: South Bolaang Mongondow
- Inaugurated: May 11, 2006
- Founder: Nimed Lumikis
- Named for: Modisi City

Government
  - Type: Mayor
  - Body: Pemerintah Modisi
  - Mayor: Grace Bawaele

Area
  - Total: 95.3 sq mi (246.8 km^{2})

Population
  - Total: 1,400
- Demonym: Siaunese
- Time zone: UTC+8
- ZIP Code(s): 95777
- Area code: 043
- Vehicle registration: 'DB xxxx P'
- GNS-ID: 12493528

Modisi is a town in South Bolaang Mongondow Regency, North Sulawesi Province, Indonesia. Modisi is divided into hamlets, namely Hamlet One Modisi and Dusun Dua Modisi, and there are 4 Rukun tetangga (RT), namely RT 01, RT 02, RT 03 and RT 04.

== Geography ==
Modisi is located at the southern tip of the island of Sulawesi. The land area is 248.6 hectares. Modisi also has a coastline of 3.7 kilometers. The town is also surrounded by hills and mountain ranges. The land area is dominated by hilly terrain with some lowlands in the coastal area. The elevation interval of the plains is between 0-40% with the highest peak in the dinopian plume. Modisi has a tropical rainforest climate with heavy to very heavy rainfall year-round. With an average of 24.9 °C (76.8 °F), December is the warmest month, while July is the coldest, averaging 23.6 °C (74.5 °F). The average rainfall is 2,367 mm/year with the driest climate around August and the wettest in January. The intensity of sunlight is on average 53% and relative humidity is ±84%.

== Climate ==
Modisi has a tropical rainforest climate (Af) with heavy to very heavy rainfall year-round. Modisi's climate is tropical. Modisi has a significant amount of rainfall during the year. This is true even for the driest month. This location is classified as Af by Köppen and Geiger. The average temperature in Modisi is 24.5 °C | 76.0 °F. Approx. 2367mm | 93.2 inches of precipitation falls every year With an average of 24.9 °C | 76.9 °F, December is the warmest month. At 23.6 °C | Average 74.5 °F, July is coldest month of the year.

Climate data for Modisi, North Sulawesi, Indonesia
Month	Jan	Feb	Mar	Apr	May	Jun	Jul	Aug	Sep	Oct	Nov	Dec	Year
Record high °C (°F)	27.1 (80.8)	27.1 (80.8)	27.2 (81.0)	26.9 (80.4)	26.4 (79.5)	25.7 (78.3)	25.2 (77.4)	25.3 (77.5)	25.9 (78.6)	26.8 (80.2)	27.1 (80.8)	27.2 (81.0)	27.2 (81.0)
Mean daily maximum °C (°F)	24.8 (76.6)	24.8 (76.6)	24.8 (76.6)	24.8 (76.6)	24.6 (76.3)	24 (75)	23.6 (74.5)	23.6 (74.5)	24 (75)	24.6 (76.3)	24.9 (76.8)	24.9 (76.8)	30.9 (87.6)
Daily mean °C (°F)	27.1 (73.9)	27.1 (73.7)	27.2 (73.7)	26.9 (73.7)	26.4 (73.6)	25.7 (72.8)	25.2 (72.2)	25.3 (72.2)	25.9 (72.5)	26.8 (73.2)	27.1 (73.9)	27.2 (74.1)	26.1 (79.0)
Mean daily minimum °C (°F)	23.3 (73.9)	23.2 (73.8)	23.2 (73.8)	23.2 (73.8)	23.1 (73.6)	22.7 (72.9)	22.3 (72.1)	22.3 (72.1)	22.5 (72.5)	22.9 (73.2)	23.3 (73.9)	23.4 (74.1)	22.1 (71.8)
Average precipitation mm (inches)	192 (7)	178 (7)	210 (8)	224 (9)	260 (10)	268 (10)	223 (8)	140 (5)	116 (4)	135 (5)	186 (7)	216 (8)	2,348 (88)
Average rainfall mm (inches)	191 (7.5)	178 (7.0)	210 (8.3)	244 (9.6)	260 (10.2)	268 (10.6)	223 (8.8)	140 (5.5)	116 (4.6)	135 (5.3)	186 (7.3)	216 (8.5)	2,367 (93.2)
Average rainy days (≥ 213)	19	16	18	20	21	20	18	14	13	15	19	20	213
Average relative humidity (%)	85	85	85	87	88	89	87	85	84	84	86	86	86
Mean monthly sunshine hours	248	224	248	217	217	217	217	217	248	248	248	248	2,797
Mean daily sunshine hours	8.1	8.2	8.2	7.9	7.6	7.4	7.3	7.6	8.0	8.5	8.3	8.2	7.9
Source: www.theweathernetwork/Modisi ID www.msn.com Weather.com climate-data.org world-climates.com worldClock.com Timedate.com Timedate.com/weather/@12493528/hourly
