= New Year's Day earthquake =

New Year's Day earthquake may refer to:

- Galilee earthquake of 1837
- 1980 Azores Islands earthquake
- 1996 Sulawesi earthquake
- 2000 Kipawa earthquake
- 2024 Noto earthquake
