= List of earthquakes in 1996 =

Earthquakes in 1996
Approximate epicenters of the earthquakes in 1996
- 4.0–5.9 magnitude
- 6.0–6.9 magnitude
- 7.0–7.9 magnitude
- 8.0+ magnitude
- Strongest magnitude: 8.2 M_{w} Indonesia
- Deadliest: 6.6 M_{w} China; 322 deaths
- Total fatalities: 582

Number by magnitude
- 9.0+: 0

This is a list of earthquakes in 1996. Only earthquakes of magnitude 6 or above are included, unless they result in damage or casualties, or are notable for some other reason. All dates are listed according to UTC time.

== By death toll ==
Rank	Death toll	Magnitude	Location	MMI	Depth (km)	Date
1	322	6.6	China, Yunnan	X (Extreme)	11.0	February 3
2	108	8.1	Indonesia, Biak Island	IX (Violent)	20.0	February 17
3	26	6.4	China, Inner Mongolia	VIII (Severe)	26.0	May 3
4	14	7.7	Peru, Nazca	VIII (Severe)	33.0	November 12
5	12	7.4	Peru, Chimbote	IV (Light)	10.0	February 21

== By magnitude ==
Rank	Magnitude	Death toll	Location	MMI	Depth (km)	Date
1	8.2	166	Indonesia, Biak Region offshore	VIII (Severe)	33.0	February 17
2	7.9	0	United States, Alaska, Aleutian Islands offshore	VII (Very Strong)	33.0	June 10
2	7.9	9	Indonesia, Sulawesi offshore	X (Extreme)	24.0	January 1
2	7.9	0	Indonesia, Flores Sea offshore	IV (Light)	587.3	June 17
5	7.7	14	Peru, Nazca offshore	VIII (Severe)	33.0	November 12
6	7.4	0	Fiji Region offshore	II (Weak)	550.2	August 5
7	7.3	0	United States, Alaska, Aleutian Islands offshore	VII (Very Strong)	26.3	June 10
8	7.2	0	Russia, Kuril Islands offshore	VI (Strong)	42.6	February 7
8	7.2	0	Fiji Region offshore	I (Not Felt)	110.9	April 16
8	7.2	1	Papua New Guinea, Bougainville Island offshore	VIII (Severe)	44.0	April 29
11	7.1	0	Philippines, Eastern Visayas offshore	VI (Strong)	33.0	June 11
11	7.1	0	Mexico, Oaxaca offshore	VII (Very Strong)	21.1	February 25
13	7.0	0	Mid-Atlantic Ridge	I (Not Felt)	10.0	June 2
13	7.0	0	Indonesia, Sulawesi offshore	VIII (Severe)	33.0	July 22

== By month ==
=== January ===
January
- Strongest magnitude: 7.9 M_{w} Indonesia
- Deadliest: 7.9 M_{w} Indonesia; 9 deaths
- Total fatalities: 9

Number by magnitude
- 8.0–8.9: 0
- 7.0–7.9: 1
- 6.0–6.9: 8

Date	Country and location	M_{w}	Depth (km)	MMI	Notes	Casualties	
Date	Country and location	M_{w}	Depth (km)	MMI	Notes	Dead	Injured
1	Tonga offshore, 65 km S of Pangai	6.0	33.0	I	-	-	-
1	Indonesia offshore, 181 km North of Palu	7.9	24.0	X	The 1996 Sulawesi earthquake damaged 350 buildings and created a tsunami up to 4 m (13 ft), 9 people were Killed and 67 people were injured.	9	67
1	Russia, 106 km Northeast of Yelizovo	6.6	33.0	VII	-	-	-
8	Russia, Sakhalinskaya Oblast	5.6	7.8	VII	Fourteen houses were damaged at Okha.	-	-
17	Indonesia, Papua Region	6.1	109.1	V	-	-	-
22	South Sandwich Islands region	6.2	10.1	I	-	-	-
27	Philippines, Surigao del Sur	6.0	33.0	V	-	-	-
30	New Zealand, Kermadec Islands offshore	6.1	14.2	I	-	-	-
30	New Zealand, Kermadec Islands offshore	6.4	33.0	IV	-	-	-
31	Russia, Kuril Islands	6.0	20.6	III	-	-	-

=== February ===
February
- Strongest magnitude: 8.2 M_{w} Indonesia
- Deadliest: 6.6 M_{w} China; 322 deaths
- Total fatalities: 495

Number by magnitude
- 8.0–8.9: 1
- 7.0–7.9: 3
- 6.0–6.9: 3

Date	Country and location	M_{w}	Depth (km)	MMI	Notes	Casualties	
Date	Country and location	M_{w}	Depth (km)	MMI	Notes	Dead	Injured
1	Russia, offshore, 93 km Northeast of Otrada	6.2	170.0	V	-	-	-
3	China, 47 km North of Lijiang	6.6	11.1	X	The 1996 Lijiang earthquake left over 1 million buildings damaged or destroyed, this left 322 people dead and 16,925 injured, about 3,000 of them seriously.	322	16,925
7	Indonesia, Central Sulawesi	6.1	13.8	VI	-	-	-
7	Russia, Offshore, 158 km east of Kamchatka	7.2	42.6	VI	Some damage was reported.	-	-
7	Russia, Offshore, 176 km SE of Kuril’sk	6.0	33.0	II	-	-	-
9	Papua New Guinea, 89 km NNW of Lae	6.1	68.5	V	-	-	-
12	Indonesia, offshore, 232 km SW of Waingapu	6.1	8.0	I	-	-	-
16	North of Ascension Island	6.6	10.6	I	-	-	-
16	Tonga, offshore, 96 km NE of Hihifo	6.0	33.0	I	-	-	-
16	Japan, offshore, 123 km East of Namie	6.7	40.8	VI	At least 4 people were Injured.	-	4
17	Indonesia, offshore, 101 km Northeast of Biak	8.1	33.0	IX	The 1996 Biak earthquake caused severe damage mostly by a 7-meter (23 ft) high tsunami, 166 people were Killed and 423 people were injured.	166	423
21	Peru, Ancash offshore	7.5	10.0	VI	7 people were killed and 2 more people were injured due to a tsunami off the coast after the 1996 Chimbote earthquake.	7	2
25	Mexico, Oaxaca offshore	7.1	21.1	VII	-	-	-

=== March ===
March
- Strongest magnitude: 6.8 M_{w} United States
- Deadliest: 6.0 M_{w} Ecuador; 27 deaths
- Total fatalities: 51

Number by magnitude
- 8.0–8.9: 0
- 7.0–7.9: 0
- 6.0–6.9: 6

Date	Country and location	M_{w}	Depth (km)	MMI	Notes	Casualties	
Date	Country and location	M_{w}	Depth (km)	MMI	Notes	Dead	Injured
3	Nicaragua, Managua offshore	6.6	33.0	VI	Doublet earthquake, some buildings were damaged in Managua.	-	-
3	Nicaragua, Managua offshore	6.7	33.0	VII	Doublet earthquake, some buildings were damaged in Managua.	-	-
17	Vanuatu, Port-Olry offshore	6.7	164.4	V	-	-	-
19	China, Xinjiang	6.3	28.2	VI	At least 24 people were killed, 128 were injured and more than 15,314 houses were damaged or destroyed in Artux.	24	128
22	United States, Alaska, Rat Islands offshore	6.8	20.4	I	-	-	-
28	Ecuador, Cotopaxi	6.0	33.0	VI	At least 27 people were killed, about 100 were injured, several thousand were left homeless and considerable damage and destruction to homes occurred.	27	100

=== April ===
April
- Strongest magnitude: 7.2 M_{w} Fiji; 7.2 M_{w} Papua New Guinea
- Deadliest: 7.2 M_{w} Papua New Guinea; 1 death
- Total fatalities: 1

Number by magnitude
- 8.0–8.9: 0
- 7.0–7.9: 2
- 6.0–6.9: 1

Date	Country and location	M_{w}	Depth (km)	MMI	Notes	Casualties	
Date	Country and location	M_{w}	Depth (km)	MMI	Notes	Dead	Injured
16	Fiji Islands offshore	7.2	110.9	I	-	-	-
19	Chile, Antofagasta	6.6	49.5	VII	-	-	-
29	Papua New Guinea, Bougainville Island	7.2	44.0	VIII	One person was killed and several dozen houses collapsed in Bougainville.	1	-

=== May ===
May
- Strongest magnitude: 6.6 M_{w} Papua New Guinea
- Deadliest: 6.0 M_{w} China; 26 deaths
- Total fatalities: 26

Number by magnitude
- 8.0–8.9: 0
- 7.0–7.9: 0
- 6.0–6.9: 2

Date	Country and location	M_{w}	Depth (km)	MMI	Notes	Casualties	
Date	Country and location	M_{w}	Depth (km)	MMI	Notes	Dead	Injured
2	Papua New Guinea, Bougainville Island offshore	6.6	500.0	III	-	-	-
3	China, Inner Mongolia	6.0	26.0	VII	At least 26 people were killed, 453 were injured and extensive damage caused by the 1996 Baotou earthquake	26	453
3	United States, Washington	5.4	3.8	VIII	Two people were injured and slight damage occurred in the epicentral area.	-	2

=== June ===
June
- Strongest magnitude: 7.9 M_{w} United States; 7.9 M_{w} Indonesia
- Total fatalities: 0

Number by magnitude
- 8.0–8.9: 0
- 7.0–7.9: 5
- 6.0–6.9: 2

Date	Country and location	M_{w}	Depth (km)	MMI	Notes	Casualties	
Date	Country and location	M_{w}	Depth (km)	MMI	Notes	Dead	Injured
1	China, Inner Mongolia	5.2	10.0	V	Some houses were damaged in Tianzhu county.	-	-
2	Northern Mid-Atlantic Ridge	7.0	10.0	I	-	-	-
10	Vanuatu, Ureparapara offshore	6.7	200.1	IV	-	-	-
10	United States, Alaska, Aleutian Islands offshore	7.9	33.0	VIII	A tsunami was observed with heights up to 1.02 m (3.3 ft) in Adak Island.	-	-
10	United States, Alaska, Aleutian Islands offshore	7.3	26.3	VII	It was an aftershock of the 7.9 earthquake that same day.	-	-
11	Philippines, Eastern Visayas offshore	7.1	33.0	VI	-	-	-
17	Indonesia, Molucca Sea	7.9	587.3	IV	Some damage occurred at Kupang.	-	-
21	Russia, Kamchatka offshore	6.7	20.0	IV	-	-	-

=== July ===
July
- Strongest magnitude: 7.0 M_{w} Indonesia
- Total fatalities: 0

Number by magnitude
- 8.0–8.9: 0
- 7.0–7.9: 1
- 6.0–6.9: 11

Date	Country and location	M_{w}	Depth (km)	MMI	Notes	Casualties	
Date	Country and location	M_{w}	Depth (km)	MMI	Notes	Dead	Injured
6	Mariana Islands region	6.2	241.1	I	-	-	-
15	Northern Mariana Islands, Pagan region	6.3	176.5	I	-	-	-
15	Mexico, Guerrero	6.8	18.3	VI	Felt strongly in Acapulco and Mexico City.	-	-
16	Russia, Kamchatka Peninsula	6.5	33.0	I	-	-	-
16	Indonesia, Palu, Central Sulawesi	6.6	33.0	VI	Some damage in Tolitoli.	-	-
20	Greece, Dodecanese Islands	6.2	33.0	V	-	-	-
22	Indonesia, Palu, Central Sulawesi	7.0	33.0	VI	Some damage in Tolitoli.	-	-
23	South of the Fiji Islands	6.5	33.0	I	-	-	-
23	South of the Fiji Islands	6.2	33.0	I	-	-	-
25	Southern East Pacific Rise	6.1	10.0	I	-	-	-
28	Indonesia, Palu, Central Sulawesi	6.0	33.0	V	-	-	-
30	Philippines, Sabang	6.1	33.0	V	Some damage in Palawan.	-	-

=== August ===
August
- Strongest magnitude: 7.4 M_{w} Fiji
- Deadliest: 0
- Total fatalities: 0

Number by magnitude
- 8.0–8.9: 0
- 7.0–7.9: 1
- 6.0–6.9: 12

Date	Country and location	M_{w}	Depth (km)	MMI	Notes	Casualties	
Date	Country and location	M_{w}	Depth (km)	MMI	Notes	Dead	Injured
2	Solomon Islands, Kirakira	6.9	33.0	VI	-	-	-
5	Tonga, 104 km NE of Hihifo	6.7	41.2	III	-	-	-
5	Ecuador, Salinas	6.3	33.0	VI	Felt in Guayas and Manabi Provinces.	-	-
5	Fiji	7.4	550.2	II	-	-	-
10	Papua New Guinea, Kokopo	6.2	33.0	VI	-	-	-
10	Japan, Akite Prefecture	6.0	10.0	VI	Six people injured in northeastern Yamagata Prefecture. Four people injured and fifteen houses damaged in Miyagi Prefecture.	-	10
11	Vanuatu, 107 km WNW of Sola	6.1	99.8	V	-	-	-
12	Molucca Sea	6.0	42.3	I	-	-	-
15	Vanuatu, 99 km NW of Sola	6.2	33.0	V	-	-	-
19	Alaska, Andreanof Islands, Aleutian Islands	6.0	33.0	III	-	-	-
19	South Indian Ocean	6.1	10.0	I	-	-	-
22	Flores Sea	6.0	595.7	I	-	-	-
27	Mid-Indian Ridge	6.0	10.0	I			

=== September ===
September
- Strongest magnitude: 6.9 M_{w} Chile
- Deadliest: 0
- Total fatalities: 0

Number by magnitude
- 8.0–8.9: 0
- 7.0–7.9: 0
- 6.0–6.9: 13

Date	Country and location	M_{w}	Depth (km)	MMI	Notes	Casualties	
Date	Country and location	M_{w}	Depth (km)	MMI	Notes	Dead	Injured
4	Costa Rica, Quepos	6.2	32.5	VI	-	-	-
5	Easter Island region	6.9	10.0	I	Local tsunami generated with maximum recorded wave heights (peak-to-trough) of 18 cm on Easter Island.	-	-
5	Easter Island region	6.2	10.0	I	Aftershock from the 6.9 the hour prior	-	-
5	Croatia, Ston–Slano	6.0	10.0	VII	Several people injured, 2,000 left homeless and extensive damage (VIII) in the Ston-Slano area, Croatia.	-	2
5	Taiwan, Lan Yun	6.8	20.0	VI	-	-	-
6	Solomon Sea	6.2	33.0	V	-	-	-
9	Chile, Coquimbo Region	6.0	39.0	VI	Some adobe houses damaged in the epicentral area.	-	-
11	Japan, Chiba Prefecture	6.2	55.0	VI	-	-	-
14	Solomon Islands, Lata	6.4	72.7	VI	-	-	-
20	Philippines, Surigao del Sur	6.4	33.0	VI	Foreshock to the 6.6 three hours later.	-	-
20	Philippines, Surigao del Sur	6.6	33.0	VI	-	-	-
20	Philippines, Surigao del Sur	6.1	33.0	V	An aftershock to the 6.6 earlier in the day.	-	-
28	Philippines, Surigao del Norte	6.3	234.8	IV	-	-	-

=== October ===
October
- Strongest magnitude: 6.9 M_{w} Fiji
- Deadliest: 6.8 M_{w} Cyprus
- Total fatalities: 2

Number by magnitude
- 8.0–8.9: 0
- 7.0–7.9: 0
- 6.0–6.9: 14

Date	Country and location	M_{w}	Depth (km)	MMI	Notes	Casualties	
Date	Country and location	M_{w}	Depth (km)	MMI	Notes	Dead	Injured
1	Owen Fracture Zone	6.4	10.0	I	-	-	-
2	Eastern Samar	6.4	33.0	VI	-	-	-
2	Russia, Kuril Islands	6.0	33.0	I	-	-	-
6	Canada, Vancouver	6.2	10.0	I	-	-	-
8	Southeast Indian Ocean Ridge	6.1	10.0	I	-	-	-
9	Cyprus	6.8	33.0	VI	One person died of a heart attack and twenty others injured on Cyprus. One person killed in Egypt. Felt in Egypt, Israel, Jordan, Lebanon and Syria.	2	20
10	Indonesia, North Sumatra	6.3	33.0	VI	Felt as far away as Malaysia.	-	-
12	Papua New Guinea, Bouganville	6.1	33.0	VI	Foreshock to the 6.8 two days later.	-	-
14	Papua New Guinea, Bouganville	6.8	24.0	VI	-	-	-
17	Philippines, Davao Occidental	6.0	116.8	IV	-	-	-
18	Japan, Kagoshima Prefecture	6.6	10.0	VII	Local tsunami generated with wave heights up to 17 cm recorded on Tanega-shima.	-	-
19	Japan, Miyazaki Prefecture	6.7	22.0	VII	Tsunami generated with recorded wave heights of 110 cm at Miyazaki, 40 cm at Nichinan and 14 cm on Tanega-shima. Minor tsunami also observed on Shikoku.	-	-
19	Fiji region	6.9	590.8	I	-	-	-
24	Russia, Chukotka Autonomous Okrug	6.1	19.9	VII	-	-	-

=== November ===
November
- Strongest magnitude: 7.7 M_{w} Peru
- Deadliest: 7.7 M_{w} Peru
- Total fatalities: 14

Number by magnitude
- 8.0–8.9: 0
- 7.0–7.9: 1
- 6.0–6.9: 17

Date	Country and location	M_{w}	Depth (km)	MMI	Notes	Casualties	
Date	Country and location	M_{w}	Depth (km)	MMI	Notes	Dead	Injured
4	Colombia, Choco	6.3	14.0	VII	-	-	-
5	New Zealand, Kermadec Island Region	6.8	369.4	V	-	-	-
5	Philippines, Surigao del Nortel	6.0	33.0	V	-	-	-
6	Japan, Bonin Islands	6.6	9.0	I	-	-	-
7	Philippines, Surigao del Nortel	6.1	33.0	V	-	-	-
11	New Zealand, Kermadec Island Region	6.2	33.0	I	Aftershock from the 6.8 six days prior.	-	-
11	Myanmar, Magway	6.0	80.0	V	-	-	-
12	Peru, Ica	7.7	33.0	VII	At least 14 people killed, 560 injured and 12,000 homeless from Chincha Alta to Acari. Over 4,000 houses damaged or destroyed at Nazca. Tsunami generated with maximum recorded wave heights (peak-to-trough) of 25 cm at Callao, Peru; 35 cm at Arica and 21 cm at Caldera, Chile.	14	560
13	Peru, Ica	6.1	33.0	VI	An aftershock of the 7.7 the day prior.	-	-
13	Peru, Ica	6.0	33.0	V	An aftershock of the 7.7 the day prior.	-	-
14	Solomon Islands	6.0	109.2	I	-	-	-
14	Tonga region	6.2	191.6	I	-	-	-
16	France, Wallis and Futuna	6.0	33.0	I	-	-	-
17	Nicaragua, Rivas	6.0	33.0	V	-	-	-
17	Fiji region	6.1	591.6	I	-	-	-
19	India, Ladakh	6.9	33.0	VII	-	-	-
20	Japan, Izu Islands	6.1	33.0	III	Felt in Tokyo.	-	-
28	Central Mid-Atlantic Ridge	6.3	10.0	I	-	-	-

=== December ===
December
- Strongest magnitude: 6.7 M_{w} Japan
- Deadliest: 0
- Total fatalities: 0

Number by magnitude
- 8.0–8.9: 0
- 7.0–7.9: 0
- 6.0–6.9: 10

Date	Country and location	M_{w}	Depth (km)	MMI	Notes	Casualties	
Date	Country and location	M_{w}	Depth (km)	MMI	Notes	Dead	Injured
1	New Zealand, Kermadec Island Region	6.2	355.8	I	-	-	-
2	Japan, Miyazaki Prefecture	6.7	49.2	VI	Local tsunami observed with maximum recorded wave heights (peak-to-trough) of 21 cm in the Nichinan-Aburatsu area and 4 cm in the Hyuga-Hososhima area.	-	-
3	Tonga region	6.2	32.7	I	-	-	-
9	Indonesia, West Java	6.1	50.9	V	-	-	-
9	Northern Mid-Atlantic Ridge	6.0	10.0	I	-	-	-
10	Central Mid-Atlantic Ridge	6.7	10.0	I	-	-	-
22	Japan, Hokkaido	6.5	226.5	IV	-	-	-
26	Indonesia, Papua	6.3	33.0	VI	-	-	-
30	Indonesia, Maluku	6.0	33.0	V	-	-	-
31	Mexico, Chiapas	6.4	99.5	VI	Felt as far as Mexico City.	-	-

== List ==
- 1996 Sulawesi earthquake (M7.9, Jan 1)
- 1996 Lijiang earthquake (M7.0, Feb 3)
- 1996 Biak earthquake (M8.1, Feb 17)
- 1996 Chimbote earthquake (M7.4, Feb 21)
- 1996 Baotou earthquake (M6.4, May 3)
- 1996 Nazca earthquake (M7.5, Nov 12)

Date	Time	Place	Lat.	Long.	Deaths	Magnitude	Comments	Sources	Main article
February 3, 1996	19:14 local time	Lijiang, Yunnan, China	27.30	100.29	322	6.6	M_{w}	USGS	1996 Lijiang earthquake
February 17, 1996	05:59	Near Biak Island, Indonesia	−0.891	136.952	108	8.1	M_{w}		1996 Biak earthquake
May 3, 1996	03:32 UTC	Near Baotou, China	40.774	109.661	26	6.4	M_{s}		1996 Baotou earthquake
November 12, 1996	16:59 UTC	Near Nazca, Peru	−14.993	75.675	14	7.5	M_{w}	USGS	1996 Nazca earthquake
