= November 1960 Peru earthquake =

Earthquake of magnitude 6.7 to 7.8

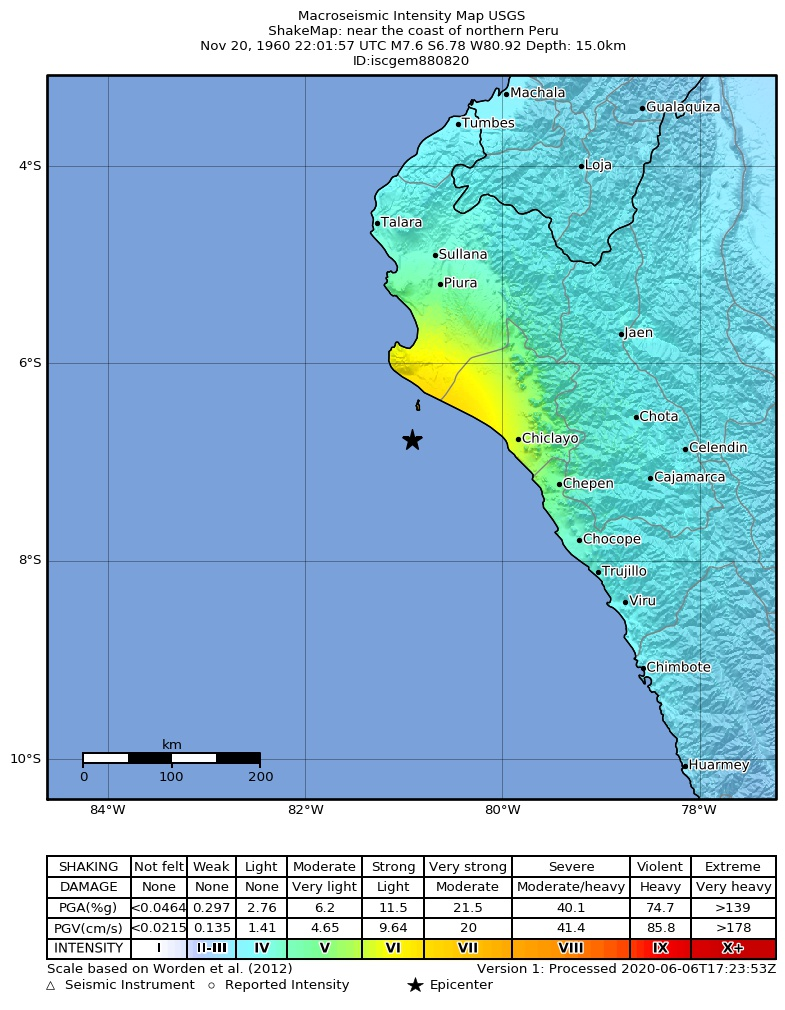
- USGS ShakeMap

- UTC time: 1960-11-20 22:01:57
- ISC event: 880820
- USGS-ANSS: ComCat
- Local date: November 20, 1960
- Local time: 17:02
- Magnitude: 7.6 or 7.8 M_{w}
- Depth: 35 km (22 mi)
- Epicenter: 6.70°S 80.62°W
- Type: Thrust
- Areas affected: Peru
- Total damage: US$550,000 (equivalent to $6.0 million in 2025)
- Max. intensity: Felt
- Tsunami: Yes
- Casualties: 66 dead, 2 injured

The November 1960 Peru earthquake occurred offshore northern Peru on November 20 at 17:02 local time. The earthquake measured M_{s} 6.7 or M_{w} 7.6–7.8. A tsunami with a height of 9 meters (30 ft) was triggered and struck Puerto Eten, Lambayeque Department. The tsunami caused damage along the coast of the Lambayeque Department. A total of 66 deaths were reported. The tsunami was also observed in Hilo, Hawaii.

== Tectonic setting ==
Peru lies on destructive plate boundary where the Nazca plate is subducting beneath the South American plate, with a convergence rate of 7.2–7.6 cm per year. The Nazca plate in northern Peru is characterised by a thin sedimentary cover and the subduction zone is categorised as erosive in type. Very few earthquake of significant magnitude have been observed along this part of the plate boundary, going back to 1619, suggesting that slip is mostly accommodated aseismically, a result of weak coupling along the plate interface.

== Earthquake ==
Based on its focal mechanism, which suggested rupture along a thrust fault dipping at 6° to the east, it is interpreted to have been caused by movement on the plate boundary. The only other large event recorded in this part of the boundary in the instrumental era is the M_{w} 7.5 1996 Chimbote earthquake, which is also interpreted to be a tsunami earthquake and had an unusually long source duration.

The magnitude of the earthquake was M_{s} 6.75 by using the conventional surface-wave magnitude measurement within a shorter duration of ~20 s. However, there is a large discrepancy between the magnitudes in M_{s} and M_{w} in this earthquake. The discrepancy was caused from the earthquake's long source duration of about 130 s, and by calculating the seismic moment, the magnitude would be M_{w} 7.6 or M_{w} 7.8, according to different sources. This earthquake belongs to a category of earthquakes with slow rupture velocities and potential of producing tsunamis larger than those expected from the moment magnitudes.

== Tsunami ==
The earthquake triggered a major tsunami that caused effects along the Peruvian coast and across the Pacific Ocean. Run-ups of 9 m (30 ft) were reported from the ports of Pimento and Puerto Eten along the coast of the Department of Lambayeque, where three separate waves were observed. Inundation of up to 1,600 metres (1 mile) was reported in contemporary news accounts. Smaller run-ups were observed elsewhere on the Peruvian coast and at Acapulco in Mexico. Small waves were also detected in Hawaii and in Japan. The tsunami was assessed as having a magnitude of M_{t} 7.75, similar to the moment magnitude of the earthquake.

== Impact ==
The tsunami caused damage to ports on the Lambayeque coast. A tug and several smaller vessels capsized. The Lobos de Afuera archipelago suffered severe damage. Observation flights over the area found no evidence of life, the complete erasure of all commercial facilities and all paths, suggesting that the archipelago has been completely submerged by the wave. The Guañape Islands were also badly affected. The NEIC tsunami database lists a total of 66 deaths, with 3 of those coming from the ports and another 13 from the Guañape Islands, with a further 50 recorded as missing. At least two people suffered serious injuries and a further 800 were rendered homeless. Total economic losses were estimated at $550,000.

== See also ==
- List of earthquakes in 1960
- List of earthquakes in Peru
