= 1996 Biak earthquake =

Earthquake and tsunami in eastern Indonesia

- Location within Papua (province) Location within Indonesia
- UTC time: 1996-02-17 05:59:30
- ISC event: 947787
- USGS-ANSS: ComCat
- Local date: 17 February 1996
- Local time: 14:59:30 WIT (Indonesia Eastern Standard Time)
- Magnitude: 8.2 M_{w}
- Depth: 20 km (12 mi)
- Epicenter: 0.95°S 136.94°E
- Type: Megathrust
- Total damage: US$ 4.2 million
- Max. intensity: MMI IX (Violent)
- Tsunami: 7.7 m (25 ft)
- Casualties: 108 dead, 423 injured, 58 missing, 10,000 displaced

The 1996 Biak earthquake, or the Irian Jaya earthquake, occurred on 17 February at 14:59:30 local time near Biak Island, Indonesia. The earthquake, which occurred on the New Guinea Trench, had a moment magnitude of 8.2 and a maximum Mercalli intensity of IX (Violent). The run-up height of the generated tsunami reached 7.7 m (25 ft). The disaster left at least 108 people dead, 423 injured, and 58 missing. It damaged or destroyed 5,043 houses which subsequently made another 10,000 homeless. At Korim, 187 houses were destroyed. Various countries and organizations provided aid and relief in the aftermath of the earthquake.

== Tectonic setting ==
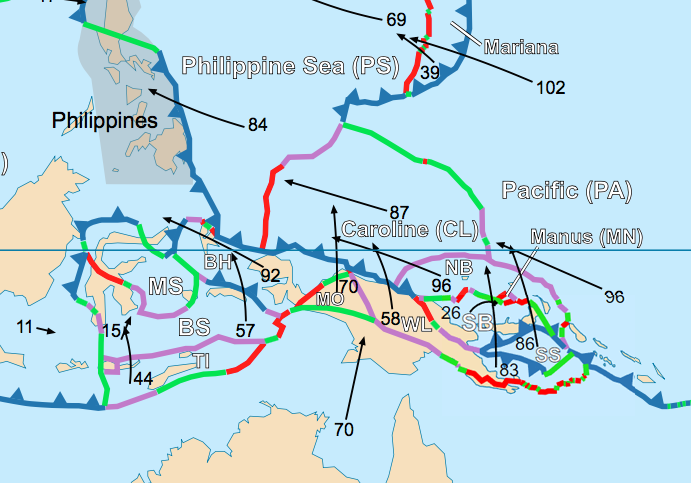
Tectonic map of the New Guinea region with relative plate motion.

New Guinea lies within a very complex tectonic regime surrounded by microplates which accommodate the collision and oblique convergence between the Australian plate and the Pacific plate. In the north, the Caroline plate and North Bismarck plate subduct underneath the Bird's Head plate and the Woodlark plate along the New Guinea Trench. The earthquake occurred at the central portion of the trench. The western portion of New Guinea has parallel subduction zones to the north and south of it along a continuation of the Philippine Trench and a convergent boundary between the Bird's Head plate and the Banda Sea plate. In western central New Guinea, the Maoke plate has multiple boundaries with various plates. At the far eastern portion of the island, the South Bismarck plate interacts with the Woodlark plate, as well as the Solomon Sea plate subducting underneath the Woodlark plate. The largest on-land plate boundary in the region, however, is between the Woodlark plate and the Australian plate. Though generally considered largely aseismic before this earthquake, this region of the New Guinea Trench may have experienced a similar large earthquake in 1914.

== Earthquake ==
Focal mechanisms indicate shallow-angle reverse faulting which is consistent with a subduction zone rupture. It ruptured an area 230 km (140 mi) long and 100 km (62 mi) wide along the New Guinea oceanic trench with an average slip of 4 m (13 ft). From the hypocenter, the rupture propagated 180 km (110 mi) to the west before propagating another 50 km (31 mi) east, ~15 seconds later. The largest slip was ~12 m (39 ft) near the hypocenter. Large aftershocks struck the area, with various focal mechanisms. The mainshock may have triggered nearby seismic structures to activate. Aftershocks were most common in the areas with the highest slip from the mainshock.

== Tsunami ==
Teletsunami observations
Location	Recorded height (m)
Shionomisaki, Japan	0.96
Chichi, Japan	1.03
Tateyama, Japan	0.90
Shemya, USA	0.35
Adak, USA	0.10
Port Alberni, Canada	0.37
Winter Harbour, Canada	0.15
Crescent City, USA	0.18
Santa Monica, USA	0.05

At Madori, on the west coast of Biak, a run-up of 7.7 m (25 ft) was measured, while at Korem in northern Biak, waves were up to 5.4 m (18 ft). The tsunami also affected parts of nearby islands, including Yapen, Owi, and Pai, where waves of 4–7 m (13–23 ft) were measured. Roughly five minutes after the shaking, nearby residents heard an extraordinarily loud sound, such as one from an airplane, which they understood as a signal that a large wave was approaching. The local coastal population fled for higher ground as result. This action is credited with saving many lives from the tsunami.

The tsunami produced was larger than expected for the size and location of the earthquake. A localized submarine landslide was a plausible explanation for the strong waves in western Biak. This is further supported by the west coast of Biak being struck by the tsunami first, despite facing away from the main tsunami source. This does not align with a traditional shallow earthquake rupture tsunami, which further lends credence to the theory of a submarine landslide in the area near Madori. Multiple landslides were reported in the area near the maximum run-up height.

== Aftermath ==
=== Domestic relief efforts ===
Immediately after the earthquake, the government of Indonesia provided rice to the affected. Some time after, the government, army, and Red Cross evacuated affected individuals, distributed aid, and constructed a mass kitchen for 1,000 residents. Transportation was a challenge as bad weather and high waves stopped boats from being able to effectively deliver relief. A team involving members of multiple governmental ministries, and the agency for National Logistics Administration airlifted 36 tents, 5,300 blankets, 500 kg (1,100 lb) of medicine, ambulances, water pumps, water containers, water, clothing, food, kerosene lamps, and plastic sheeting. The Ministry of Social Affairs later delivered a further US$15,486 of food, 34 tons of rice, and "other immediate relief items". The Indonesian public donated US$74,588, as well as food items and building materials. The First Lady of Indonesia contributed US$63,938 in cash, as well as 8,000 pieces of clothing.

=== International relief efforts ===
The UNDP donated US$25,000 for blankets, plastic sheeting, and food. Australia donated US$55,555 for emergency relief items and to cover the costs of relief operations carried out by helicopter. Japan donated US$84,000 toward a three-member team of experts to help assess damage and to assist in relief operations. An additional US$192,000 was provided to cover the costs of airlifting tents, water tanks, generators, carpentry kits, and medical equipment, and another US$200,000 to help locals buy relief items. As well, the government of Yamagata Prefecture chipped in US$9,346. USAID donated US$265,486 for housing (plastic sheeting, tents, blankets), US$10,000 to help with distributing relief as well as a two-member assessment team. Another US$10,000 was to distribute relief items. The Association of Medical Doctors of Asia contributed a team of three doctors with supplies and tools to help treat the injured.

== See also ==
- List of earthquakes in 1996
- List of earthquakes in Indonesia
- 1976 Papua earthquake
