= 1996 Nazca earthquake =

Earthquake in Peru

- Location within Peru
- UTC time: 1996-11-12 16:59:45
- ISC event: 996809
- USGS-ANSS: ComCat
- Local date: 12 November 1996
- Local time: 11:59:45 PET
- Magnitude: 7.7 M_{w}
- Depth: 33 km (21 mi)
- Epicenter: 14.993°S 75.675°W
- Areas affected: Peru
- Max. intensity: MMI VIII (Severe)
- Casualties: 14 fatalities

The 1996 Nazca earthquake occurred on November 12 at 16:59 UTC (11:59 local time). The earthquake was located offshore near Nazca, Peru. It has a magnitude of M_{w} 7.7. Fourteen people were reported dead. Four-thousand houses collapsed and 11,000 were partially damaged. Nazca and Acarí were the most affected cities. Liquefaction was observed in the bed of the Yauca River. The intensity was VIII (Severe) in Nazca. A tsunami was triggered by this earthquake. The recorded peak-to-trough heights of the tsunami were 25 cm in Callao, Peru and 35 cm in Arica, Chile.

In this area, the Nazca plate is subducting beneath the South American plate. This earthquake occurred at the plate interface and is associated with the subduction of the 1.5 km high Nazca Ridge beneath the South American plate. This was a complex event, and there were at least two larger events occurring between 18 and 30 seconds after the onset. This earthquake may have ruptured part of the rupture zone of the earthquake of August 24, 1942.

== See also ==
- List of earthquakes in 1996
- List of earthquakes in Peru
