= Agadir Oufla =

Moroccan cultural heritage site

Kasbah of Agadir Oufla
- قصبة أكادير أوفلا
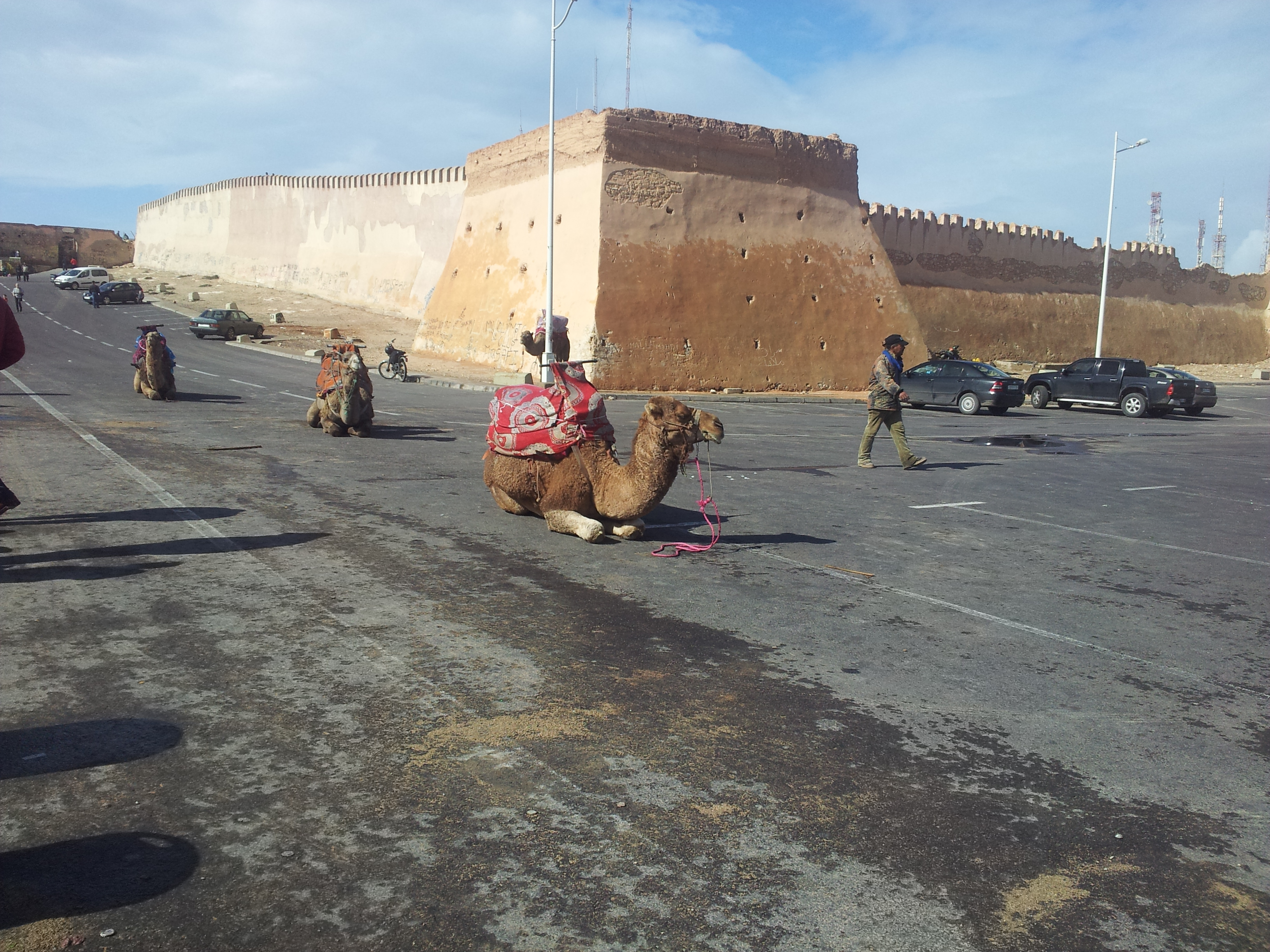
- Interactive map of Kasbah of Agadir Oufla
- Location: Agadir
- Coordinates: 30°25′49″N 9°37′29″W
- Beginning date: 16th century
- Restored date: 2020

The Kasbah of Agadir Oufla is a historical landmark in Agadir, Morocco, that housed the old city of Agadir, much of which was affected by the earthquake that struck the city in 1960. The fort is located on the top of a mountain rising 236 meters above sea level in the north of the town of Agadir, near the current port.

== Name ==
Agadir Oufla is the local name of the Kasbah of Agadir. The word "Agadir" means "fort", and "Oufla" is a Berber word meaning "above". Agadir Ofla, therefore, implies "the fortress at the top".

== History ==
It is not clear if there was any settlement in the place before the 16th century. Prior to the fortification of the site by the Sa'dis, the Portuguese nobleman João Lopes de Sequeira occupied the area in 1505. He built a wooden castle at the foot of a hill and a Portuguese colony named Santa Cruz do Cabo do Gué was created. The castle was later bought by the King of Portugal in 1513. Their presence elicited growing hostility from the local population of the Sous, until in 1540 the Sa'di sultan Muhammad al-Shaykh occupied the main hill above the city and installed artillery to prepare an attack on the Portuguese fortress below. The siege began in February 1541 and was successfully concluded in March. The site was then left unoccupied for years until Muhammad's successor, Abdallah al-Ghalib (r. 1557–1574), built a new fortress on the hilltop.

The site was classified as a historical monument in 1932. The Kasbah was destroyed for the first time in November 1755 during the Lisbon earthquake, and again in 1960, during the Agadir earthquake.

The Kasbah underwent a major restoration in 2002. The restoration has been criticized by one scholar, in particular for its use of materials that obscure the form of the buildings before the reconstruction. The Kasbah was renovated again in 2020 under the instructions of King Mohammed VI. The rehabilitation project included preventive archaeological work to document the ramparts and guide the restoration of the site. On 8 September 2023, an earthquake struck the kasbah, which led to damages.

== Components of the fort before the 1960 earthquake ==
Before the 1960 earthquake, the Kasbah included defensive, religious, civic and residential elements, including:

- The outer wall is supported by towers and has a twisted door designed for defensive purposes.
- Great Mosque.
- Hospital.
- Treasury and postal building
- Houses, alleys and junior yards.
- Mallah, a Jewish neighborhood
- Shrines, the most important one is the mausoleum of Sidi Boudjemaa Agnaou.
- Mausoleum of Lala Yamna

== Gallery ==
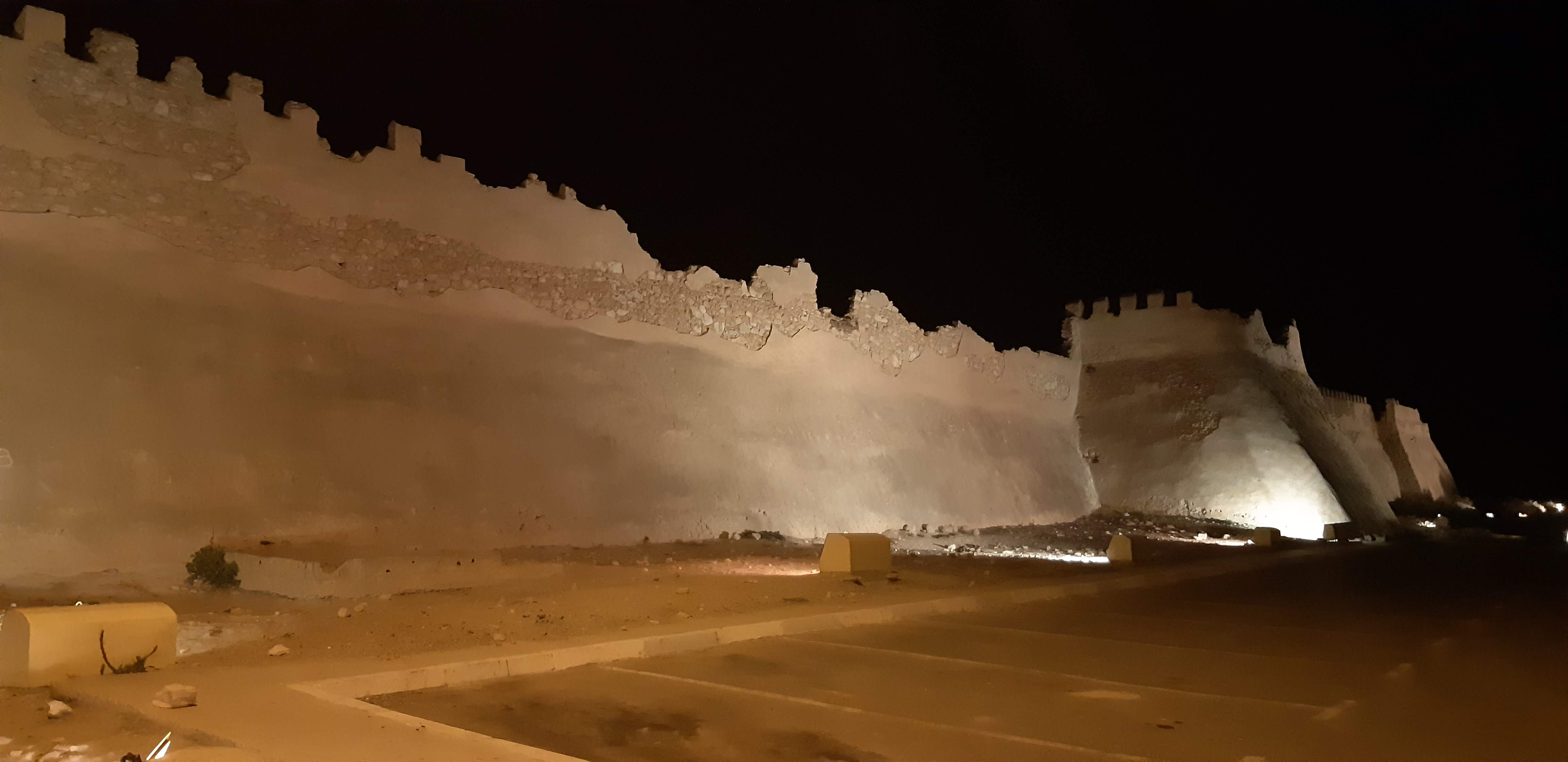
Lighting walls Agadir Kasbah night

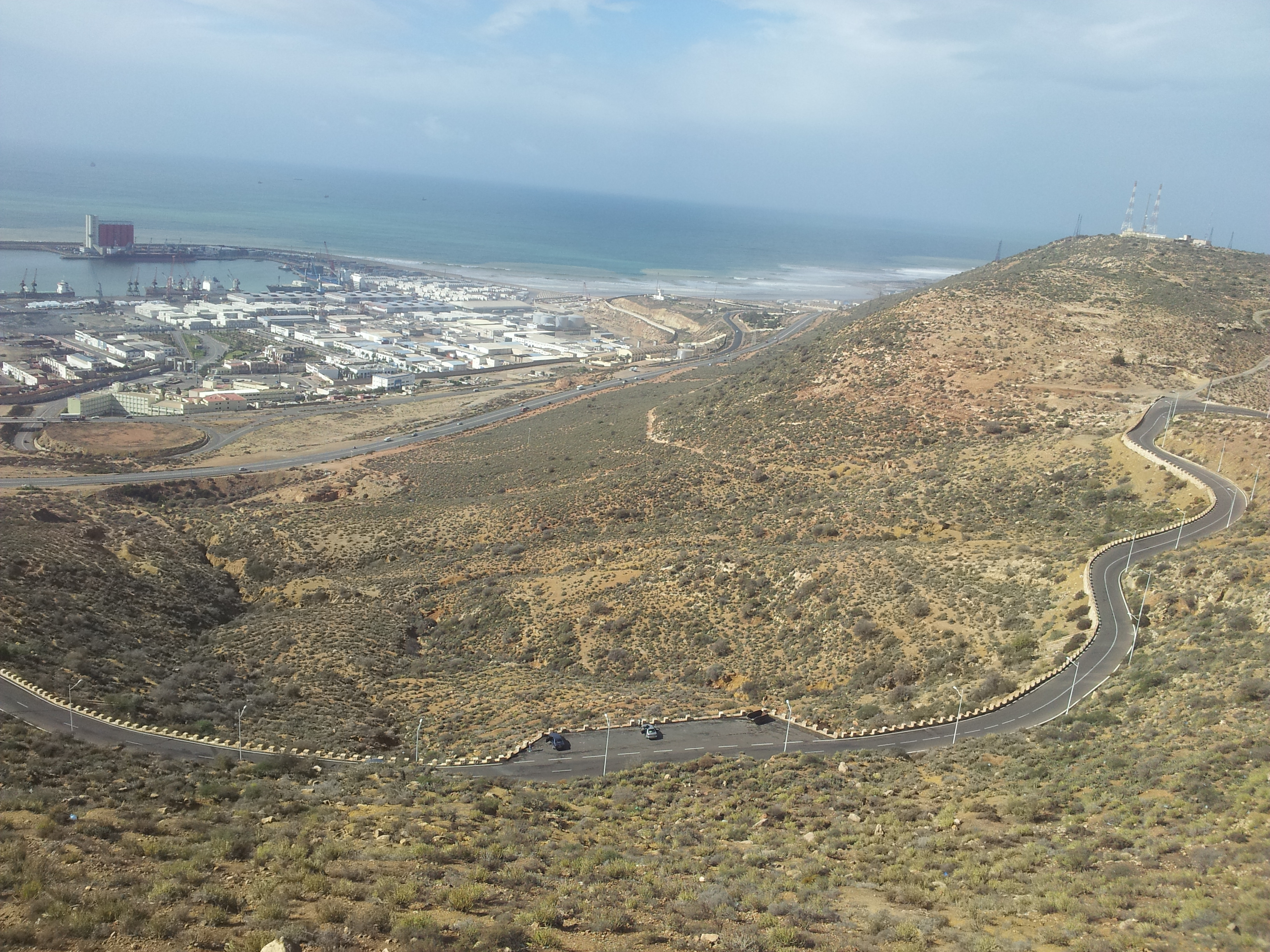
View from the hill to the port of Agadir

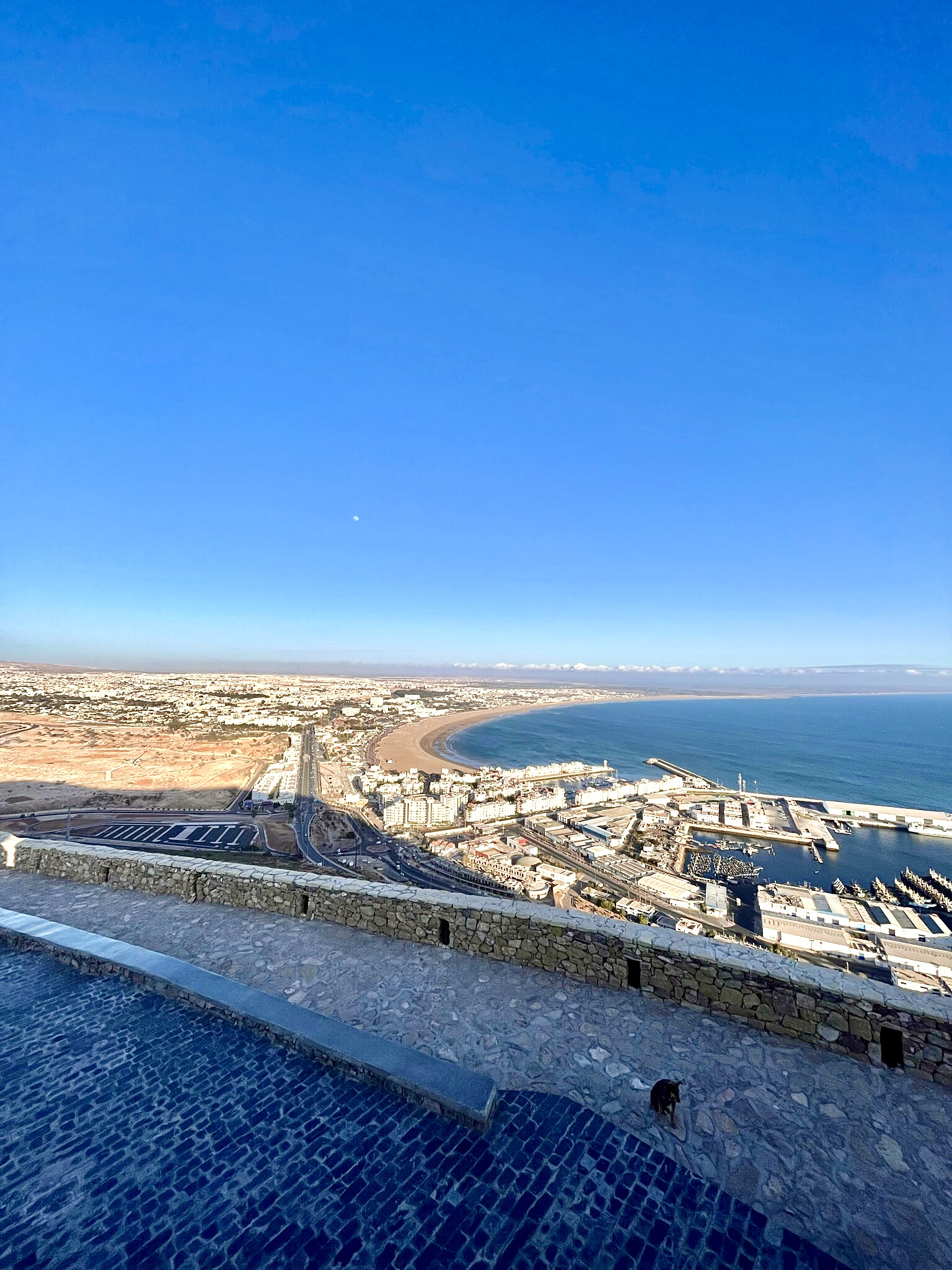
View from the Kasbah of Agadir Oufla

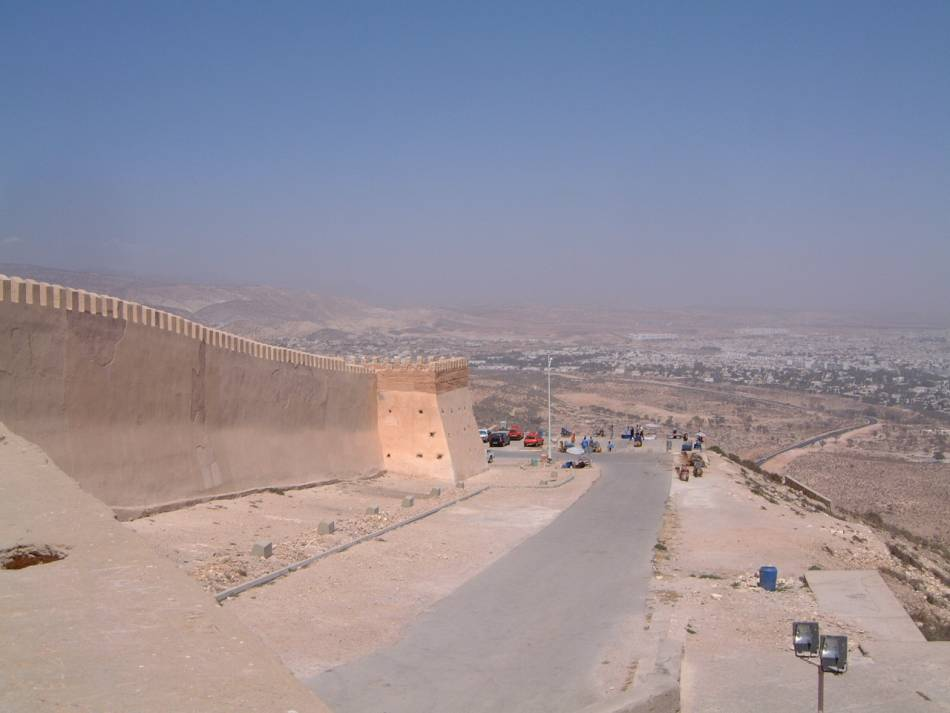
Agadir Kasbah Walls

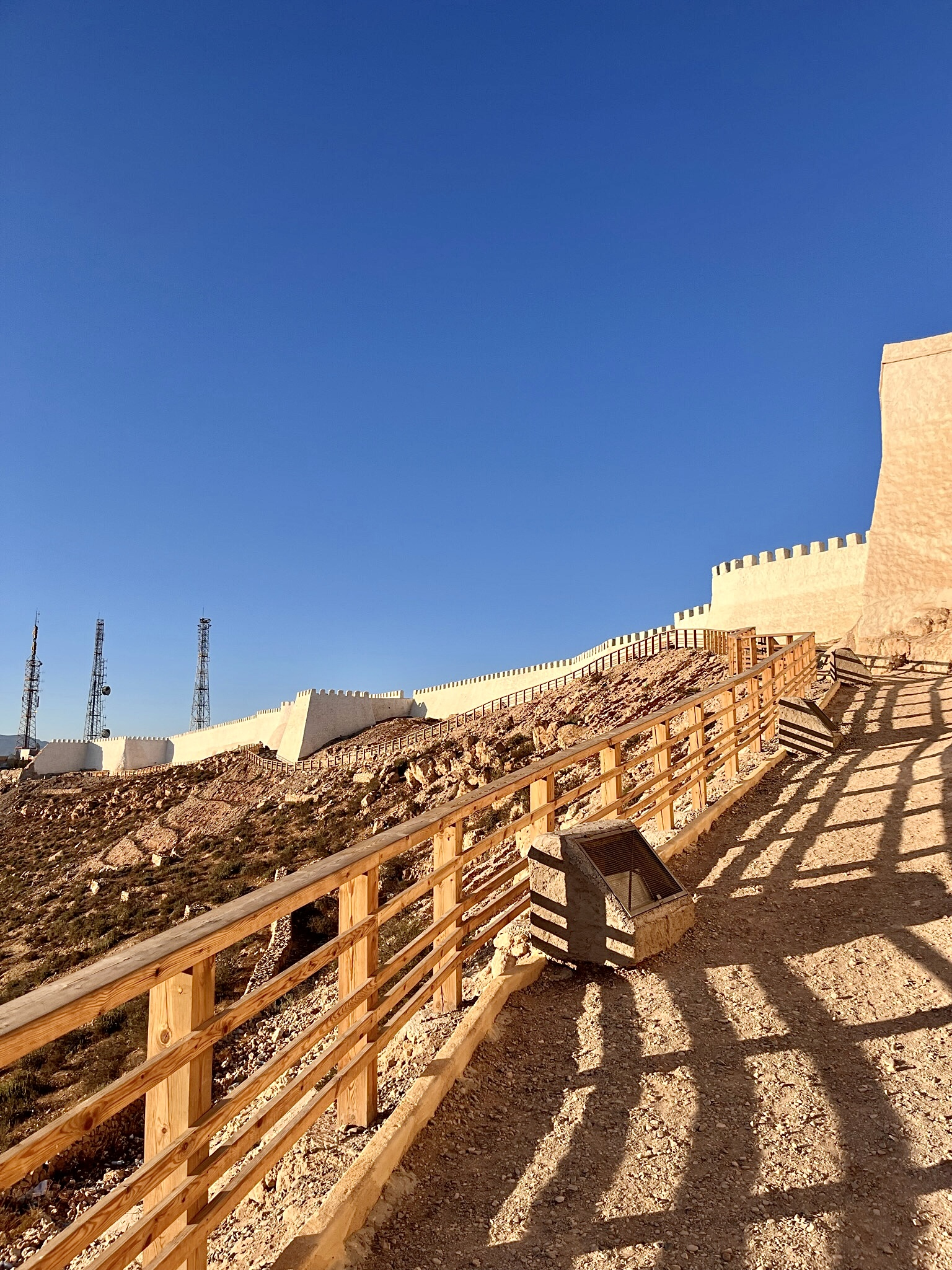
Back of the walls of Agadir Oufella
