= 1960 Concepción earthquakes =

Earthquakes in Chile

The first 1960 Concepción earthquake
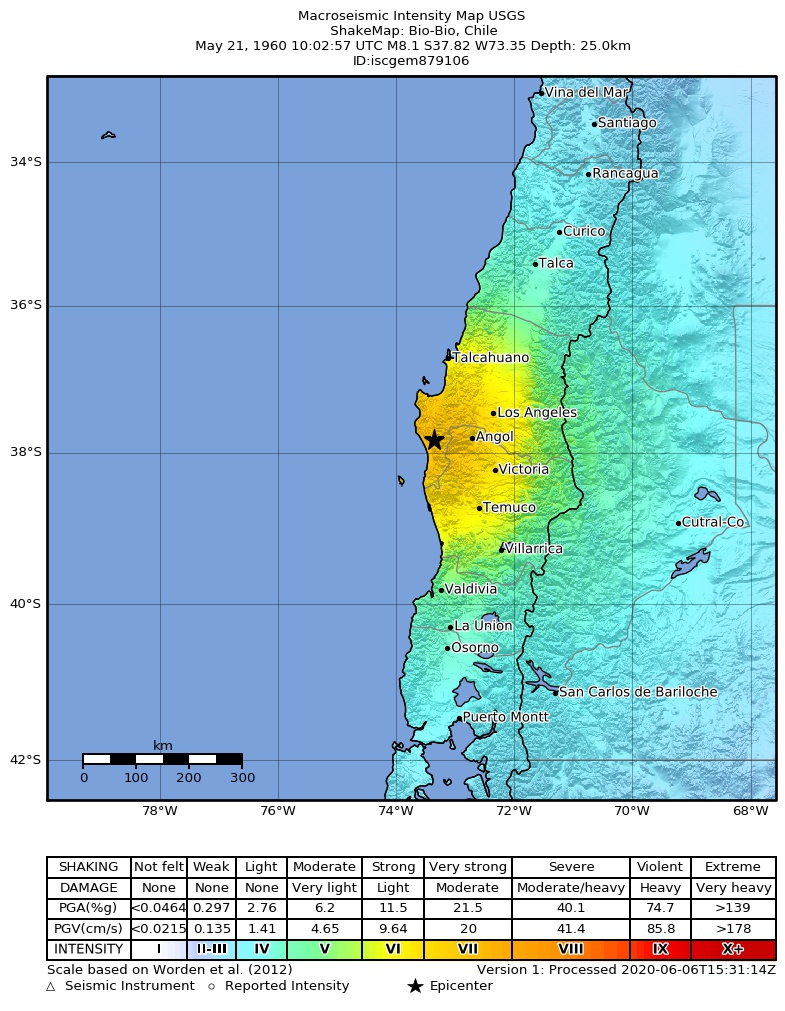
- USGS ShakeMap of the 1st earthquake

- Location within South America Location within Chile
- UTC time: 1960-05-21 10:02
- ISC event: 879106
- USGS-ANSS: ComCat
- Local date: May 21, 1960
- Local time: 6:02 AM UTC-4
- Magnitude: 8.1 M_{w} 8.3 M_{s}
- Depth: 25.0 km (15.5 mi)
- Epicenter: 37.824°S 73.353°W
- Areas affected: Chile
- Max. intensity: MMI X (Extreme)
- Casualties: 125 dead

The 1960 Concepción earthquakes were a succession of three destructive earthquakes that happened between 21 and 22 May 1960. They formed part of the foreshock sequence for the 1960 Valdivia earthquake, the largest recorded earthquake in history.

The first was on May 21 at 06:02 UTC-4. Its epicenter was near Cañete, Arauco Province, Chile, and its magnitude was 8.1 or 8.3M_{W} and 7.3 or 7.5M_{S}. This earthquake, which lasted 35 seconds, destroyed a third of the buildings in the city of Concepción.

The earthquake effectively interrupted and ended Lota's coal miners march on Concepción where they demanded higher salaries.

First earthquake intensity
21 May at 6:02 UTC earthquake
City	MMI	Damage
Concepción	IX	125 dead. A third of the buildings were destroyed.
Talcahuano	IX	65% of buildings were destroyed.
Coronel	IX	
Lota	IX	
Lebu	X	

The second 1960 Concepción earthquake
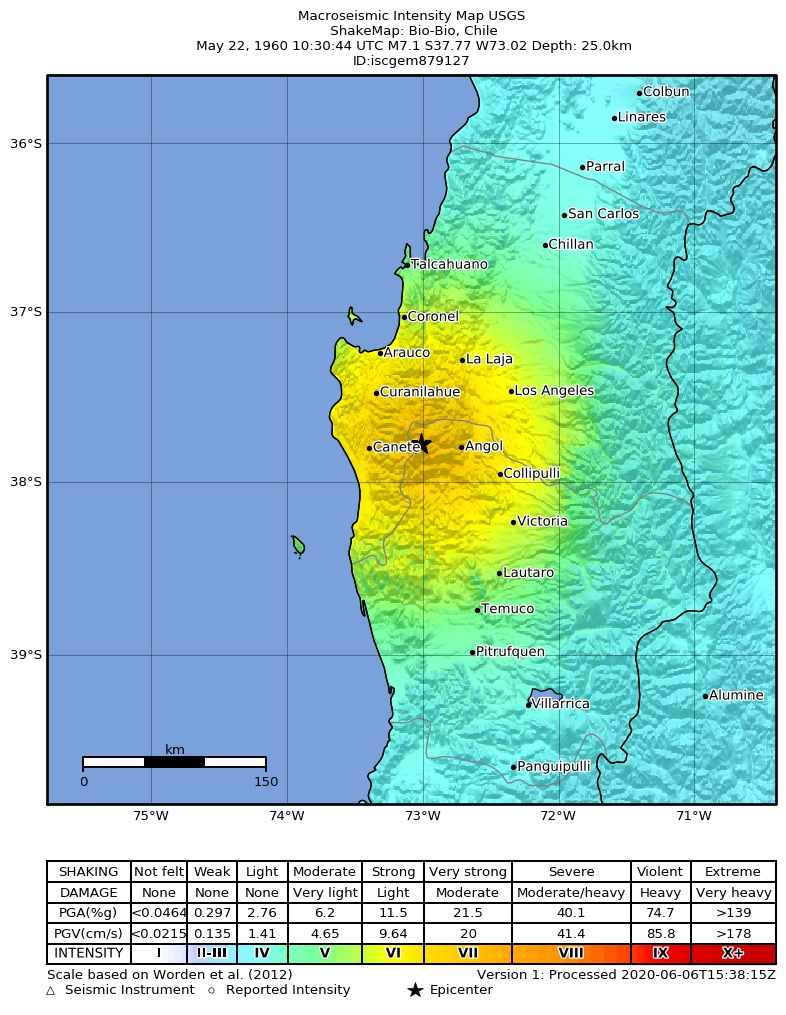
- USGS ShakeMap of the 2nd earthquake
- UTC time: 1960-05-22 10:30:44
- ISC event: 879127
- USGS-ANSS: ComCat
- Local date: 22 May 1960
- Local time: 06:30 AM UTC-4
- Magnitude: 7.1 M_{w}
- Depth: 25.0 km
- Epicenter: Nahuelbuta National Park; 37°46′30″S 73°01′02″W
- Areas affected: Concepción, Arauco and Ñuble in Chile
- Max. intensity: MMI VII (Very strong)

The second happened on May 22 at 06:30 UTC-4. Its epicenter was in the Nahuelbuta National Park, Malleco Province, Chile, and its magnitude was 7.1 M_{w}. It was followed by a 6.8 M_{w} earthquake at 06:32 UTC-4.

The third 1960 Concepción earthquake
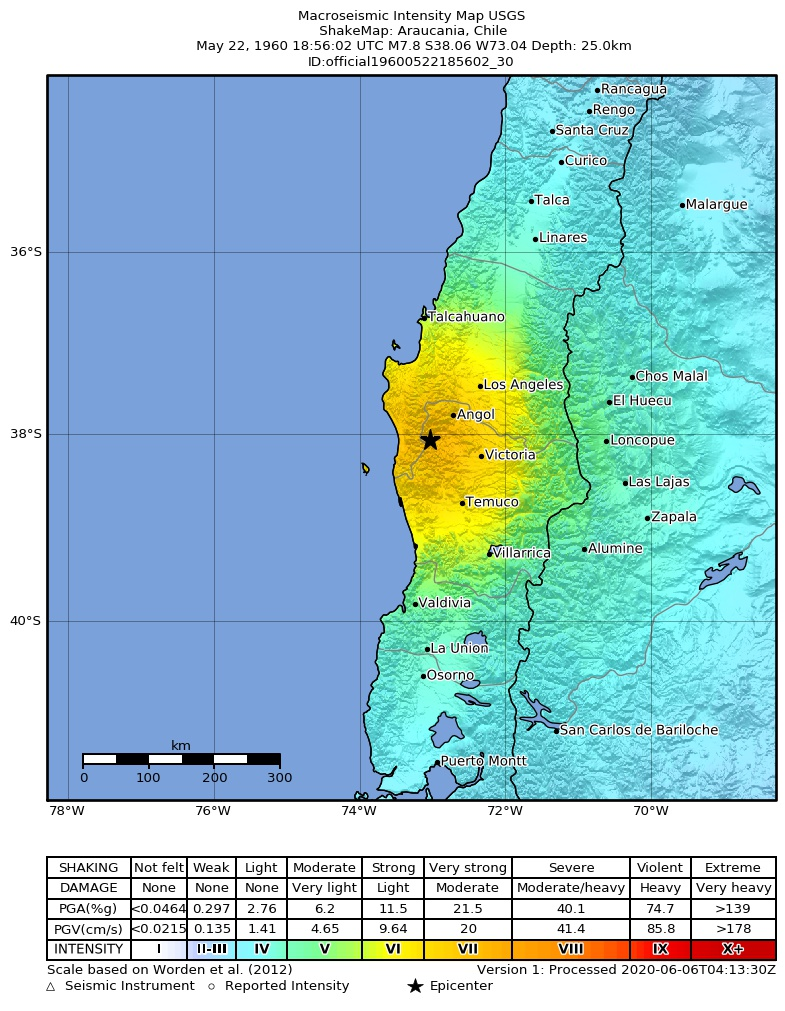
- USGS ShakeMap of the 3rd earthquake
- UTC time: 1960-05-22 18:56:02
- ISC event: 879134
- USGS-ANSS: ComCat
- Local date: 22 May 1960
- Local time: 14:56 PM UTC-4
- Magnitude: 7.8 M_{w} 7.8 M_{S}
- Depth: 25 km
- Epicenter: Purén; 38°03′39.6″S 73°02′20.4″W
- Areas affected: Concepción, Arauco and Ñuble in Chile

The third happened the same day at 14:56 UTC-4. Its epicenter was near Purén, Malleco Province, Chile and its magnitude was 7.8 M_{S} or 7.8 M_{w}. This earthquake happened 15 minutes before the 1960 Valdivia earthquake.

== See also ==
- 1960 Valdivia earthquake
- List of earthquakes in 1960
- List of earthquakes in Chile
