= 1960 Agadir earthquake =

Earthquake in Morocco

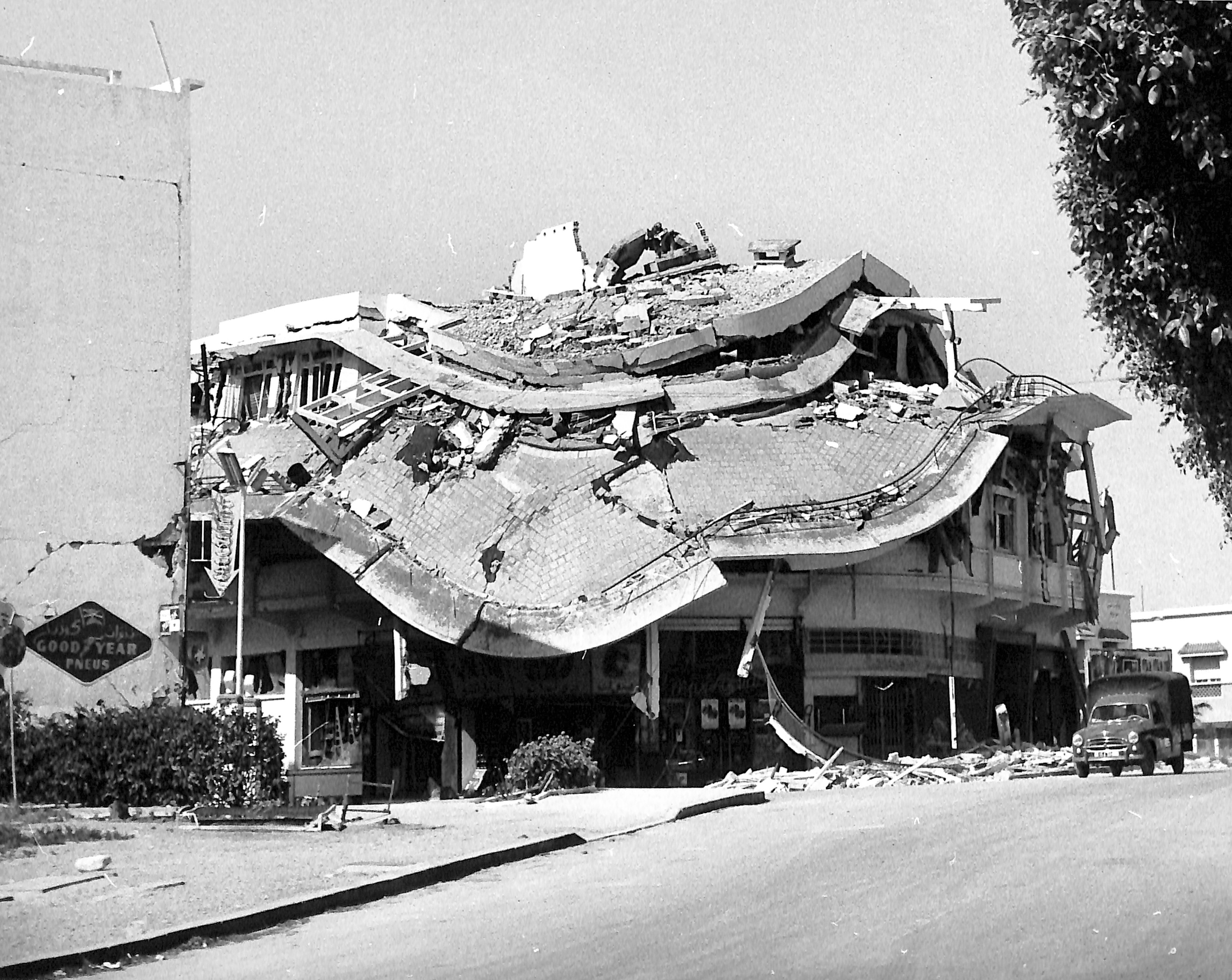
- Building damage in Agadir

- Location within Morocco
- UTC time: 1960-02-29 23:40:18
- ISC event: 878424
- USGS-ANSS: ComCat
- Local date: 29 February 1960
- Local time: 23:40:18 WET (UTC±00:00)
- Duration: < 15 seconds
- Magnitude: 5.8 M_{w}
- Depth: 15 km
- Epicenter: 30.35°N 9.69°W
- Areas affected: Morocco
- Max. intensity: MMI X (Extreme)
- Foreshocks: 23 February MMI III (Weak); 29 February MMI VI (Strong)
- Aftershocks: 22 March MMI VI (Strong); 17 April MMI VI (Strong)
- Casualties: ~ 12,000–15,000 dead ~ 12,000 injured

The 1960 Agadir earthquake occurred on 29 February at 23:40:18 Western European Time near the city of Agadir, located in western Morocco on the shore of the Atlantic Ocean. Despite the earthquake's moderate M_{w} scale magnitude of 5.8, its relatively shallow depth (15.0 km) resulted in strong surface shaking, with a maximum perceived intensity of X (Extreme) on the Mercalli intensity scale. Between 12,000 and 15,000 people (about a third of the city's population of the time) were killed and another 12,000 injured with at least 35,000 people left homeless, making it the most destructive and deadliest earthquake in Moroccan history. Particularly hard hit were Founty, the Kasbah, Yachech/Ihchach and the Talborjt area. The earthquake's shallow focus, close proximity to the port city of Agadir, and unsatisfactory construction methods were all reasons declared by earthquake engineers and seismologists as to why it was so destructive.

== Geology ==
The Atlas Mountains are an intracontinental mountain belt extending 2,000 km (1,200 mi) from Morocco to Tunisia. These mountains formed during the Cenozoic by continental collision. The mountain range reaches its highest elevation to the west, in Morocco. The High Atlas formed during the reactivation of an ancient rift from the Triassic. However rather than extensional forces, the reactivation compressed the rift feature due to the collisional feature in the north.

Seismicity in Morocco is concentrated in the country's north and the Alboran Sea region. South of the Rif, seismic activity is sparse but distributed across the Middle Atlas, High Atlas, and Anti-Atlas. Seismicity in the Saharan Atlas is limited, and absent in the Saharan region south of the belt; it is also less active eastwards in Algeria and Tunisia. Earthquakes in the Atlas Mountains display focal mechanisms of strike-slip, thrust or a combination of both (oblique-slip). The 2023 Al Haouz earthquake was the largest in the Atlas Mountains, striking northeast of Agadir. Measuring M_{w} 6.9, it ruptured a blind thrust fault. The sparsely populated location of the earthquake limited the death toll to just under 3,000.

== Earthquake ==
While the shock was recorded by seismographs around the world, few of these stations were close enough to the scene to locate the epicenter with high accuracy, but with what information was available the instrumental location was determined to have been 8 kilometres (5.0 mi) to the north-northwest of the Kasbah. Macroseismic observations (establishing the locations with the highest observed intensity) placed the epicenter about 1 kilometre (0.62 mi) north of Yachech. A sequence of minor foreshocks preceded the main event. The first shock occurred on 23 February with an intensity of III or IV (Weak to Light) and on the day of the disaster, a more significant foreshock with an intensity of VI (Strong) caused alarm around the lunchtime hour.

The main shock took place on the third day of the Muslim observance of Ramadan, immediately collapsing many hotels, apartments, markets, and office buildings. Underground water mains broke and sewer systems crumbled. The Kasbah of Agadir Oufla, a dilapidated fortress which had stood for centuries, crumbled on the side of a hill. With no water pressure and most fire stations having collapsed (killing their occupants) many fires were left burning in the resort city of Agadir with few firefighters and resources to fight them. With nearly seventy percent of the city in ruins, no rescue operations were able to be initiated or arranged from within Agadir. By morning the French army and sailors from the United States Sixth Fleet approached the coast, anchored, and prepared for the rescue process.

British author Gavin Maxwell was staying in Morocco at the time of the disaster and his book The Rocks Remain opens with a vivid description drawn from his own experiences and those of others in the area, including important personages in the Moroccan government who numbered among his friends.

=== Response ===
Mohammed V broadcast a request that all cities of Morocco prepare and send aid. He and his son, Crown Prince Moulay Hassan, flew to the area along with several cabinet ministers to observe the impact firsthand. In his role as Imam, he gave special dispensation to rescue workers to set aside the requirement to abstain from food and drink during daylight in Ramadan, but many workers nevertheless continued to fast. Military planes from France and the United States flew into Agadir to assist with the relief effort. The Moroccan Army provided emergency aid and helicopters arrived from the Ben Guerir Air Base, around 249 km (155 mi) away.

Upon arrival, Rear Admiral Frank Akers (commander of the U.S. fleet air arm in the eastern Atlantic and Mediterranean) toured the scene and reported that the Agadir hospital was in ruins. One of the many victims of the disaster was author and lawyer Robin Maugham. He was treated at a hospital in Casablanca for minor injuries he received while at the Saada resort when it collapsed – he had been trapped under a fallen beam for several hours. The city of Agadir was evacuated two days after the earthquake in order to avoid the spread of disease.

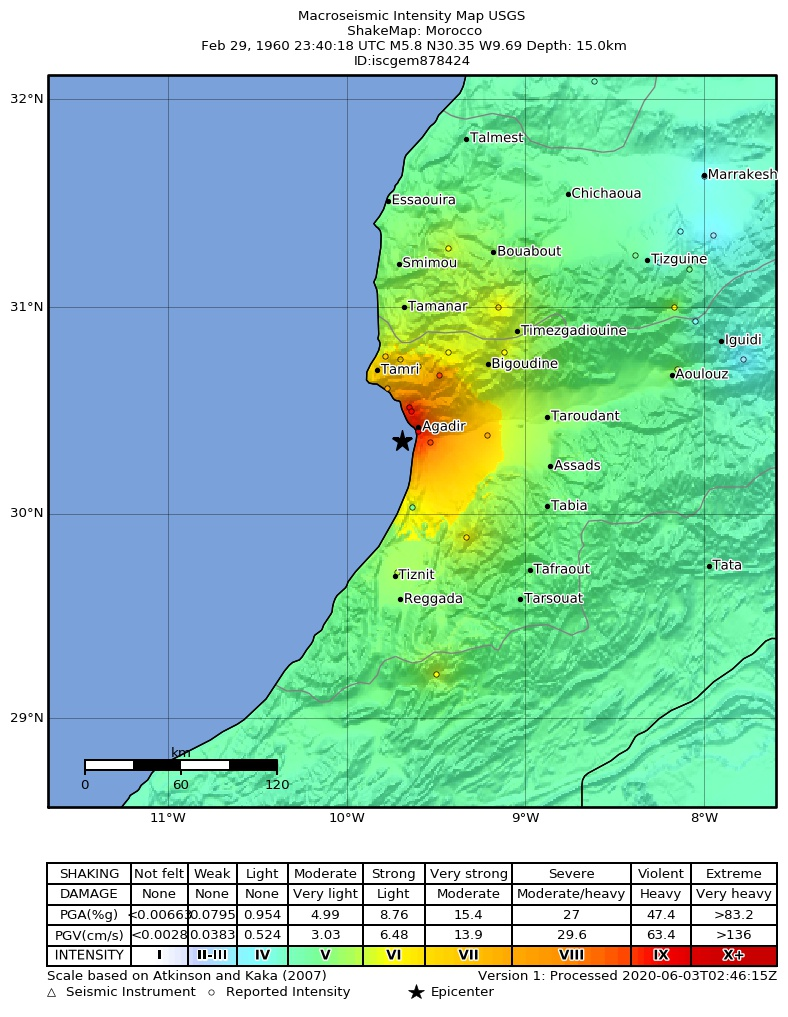
USGS ShakeMap showing the intensity of the earthquake

The rescue work was hampered both by the level of destruction and by the weather – temperatures were unusually high for the time of year, reaching 40 °C (104 °F). Rapid putrefaction of the thousands of corpses created a foul and unhealthy atmosphere, and adherence to the Ramadan fast caused further strain on rescue workers. Many victims also refused medical treatment, believing that to accept it would constitute breaking their fast. Rescue workers were equipped with gas masks, and quicklime was spread over areas where rescue was considered hopeless, to destroy the rotting corpses – the risk of killing buried survivors as well being accepted. Disinfectant and DDT were sprayed over the ruins from lorries and helicopters to control disease and kill the swarms of flies which were attracted to the scene. The ruins also became infested by rats from the destroyed sewer network and rat poison was spread to kill them; larger animals, such as stray dogs and cats which fed on the human corpses, were shot. Looters were also attracted to the destruction; they were shot on sight and their bodies dumped in mass graves along with those of the victims. These measures were viewed as callous and brutal by those remote from the scene, but given the scale of the destruction and the rapid infestation of the ruins by potential carriers of disease, drastic measures were seen as necessary in order to prevent still further loss of life from epidemic.

=== Damage ===
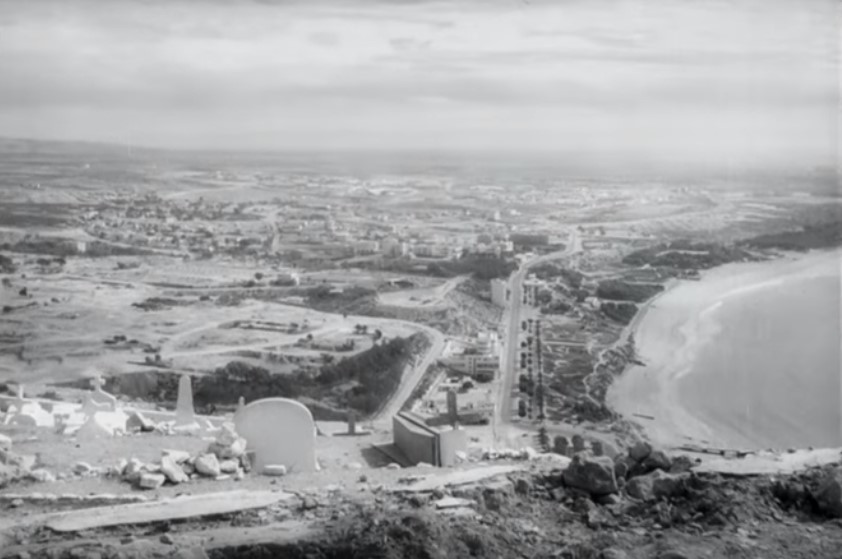
View of Agadir following the earthquake

Construction in Agadir progressed rapidly between 1945 and 1955, with specific conditions that may have contributed to the high degree of destruction. Challenging designs were often undertaken with untrained workers, and a lack of good supervision was typical, along with an accelerated effort to finish the job. As there had been no serious earthquakes prior to 1960, construction in the city had been done without consideration of seismic activity. Masonry buildings of more than one story did not fare well, but reinforced concrete structures varied dramatically in their response. For example, some of the highest of this type collapsed completely, while a good number of them resisted the shock well, and some others escaped damage altogether. In most cases of complete collapse, the design of the buildings lacked with respect to building regulations, as these were not a primary concern of the architects and inadequate enforcement of the ordinances was also a factor.

Many quarters of the city consisted entirely of buildings constructed from rammed earth. These had essentially zero earthquake resistance and disintegrated completely into dust. In these areas rescue work was impossible and survival rates were negligible; for example, in the Talbourdjt area, out of 5,000 inhabitants fewer than ten survived.

== Tsunami ==
The newspaper report on 2 March 1960 described how a tsunami was reported to have come ashore shortly after the earthquake, stating "A tidal wave curled in across the white beaches and lanced 300 metres/yards into the town. The city dock was cut in two, a Spanish shipmaster radioed." A tsunami disaster was later refuted by a report from the American Iron and Steel Institute after a team of earthquake engineers, including Ray W. Clough from the University of California, Berkeley, surveyed the damage and building failures throughout the Agadir area in March 1960. The report of their findings stated that the port facilities suffered damage due to fairly uniform subsidence in the harbor area that was responsible for knocking over five large cranes, but no evidence of nor any reliable witness to large waves was found, with the exception of a Dutch freighter crew who stated that large swells in the harbor did cause the separation of their mooring lines at the time of the earthquake. A report in a 1964 issue of the Bulletin of the Seismological Society of America also denied the existence of a destructive tsunami because of a lack of evidence from a nearby tide gauge.

== See also ==
- List of earthquakes in 1960
- List of earthquakes in Morocco
