= List of earthquakes in 1960 =

Earthquakes in 1960
Approximate epicenters of the earthquakes in 1960
- 4.0–5.9 magnitude
- 6.0–6.9 magnitude
- 7.0–7.9 magnitude
- 8.0+ magnitude
- Strongest: Chile, Biobío Region (Magnitude 9.5) May 22
- Deadliest: Morocco, offshore Agadir (Magnitude 5.8) February 29 13,100 deaths
- Total fatalities: 15,956

Number by magnitude
- 9.0+: 1

This is a list of earthquakes in 1960. Only magnitude 6.0 or greater earthquakes appear on the list. Lower magnitude events are included if they have caused death, injury or damage. Events which occurred in remote areas will be excluded from the list as they wouldn't have generated significant media interest. All dates are listed according to UTC time. An eventful year in part helped by two significant events. Firstly, in February the deadliest event of the year struck Morocco with over 13,000 deaths. The magnitude of the earthquake was a fairly modest 5.8 but its proximity to Agadir attributed to the high death toll. Secondly, in May a series of large earthquakes rocked central Chile. Part of the sequence was the largest earthquake of all time on May 22. The event reached 9.5 in magnitude and helped spawn a destructive tsunami which affected the Pacific Rim. Aside from this 1960 was active for Peru which had 3 magnitude 7.0+ events. Japan had a magnitude 8.0 in March. Iran had a deadly event in April.

== Overall ==
=== By death toll ===
| Rank | Death toll | Magnitude | Location | MMI | Depth (km) | Date |
|---|---|---|---|---|---|---|
| 1 | 13,100 | 5.8 | Morocco, Agadir | IX (Violent) | 15.0 | February 29 |
| 2 | 2,226 | 9.5 | Chile, Biobío Region | XII (Extreme) | 25.0 | May 22 |
| 3 | 420 | 5.9 | Iran, Fars province | VII (Very strong) | 15.0 | April 24 |
| 4 | 125 | 8.1 | Chile, Concepción | X (Extreme) | 30.0 | May 21 |
| 5 | 66 | 7.6 | Peru, off the coast of northern Peru | IX (Violent) | 15.0 | November 20 |
| 6 | 63 | 7.5 | Peru, Arequipa Region | X (Extreme) | 130.0 | January 13 |
| 7 | 47 | 5.6 | France, Bouïra Province, Algeria | ( ) | 33.0 | February 21 |
| 8 | 24 | 6.5 | (Democratic Republic of the Congo) Republic of the Congo, South Kivu | VIII (Severe) | 13.7 | September 22 |

- Note: At least 10 casualties

=== By magnitude ===
| Rank | Magnitude | Death toll | Location | MMI | Depth (km) | Date |
|---|---|---|---|---|---|---|
| 1 | 9.5 | 2,226 | Chile, Biobío Region | XII (Extreme) | 25.0 | May 22 |
| 2 | 8.1 | 1 | Chile, Biobío Region | VIII (Severe) | 25.0 | May 21 |
| 3 | 8.0 | 0 | Japan, off the east coast of Honshu | VI (Strong) | 15.0 | March 20 |
| = 4 | 7.8 | 0 | Chile, Araucanía Region | X (Extreme) | 25.0 | May 22 |
| = 4 | 7.8 | 0 | Chile, Aysén Region | VIII (Severe) | 15.0 | June 6 |
| 5 | 7.6 | 66 | Peru, off the coast of northern Peru | IX (Violent) | 15.0 | November 20 |
| 6 | 7.5 | 63 | Peru, Arequipa Region | X (Extreme) | 130.0 | January 13 |
| 7 | 7.4 | 1 | Chile, off the coast of Araucanía Region | V (Moderate) | 20.0 | November 1 |
| 8 | 7.3 | 0 | Chile, Antofagasta Region | VIII (Severe) | 35.0 | December 2 |
| = 9 | 7.2 | 0 | New Hebrides, Vanuatu | ( ) | 242.7 | March 8 |
| = 9 | 7.2 | 0 | United Kingdom, south of Fiji | ( ) | 30.0 | November 24 |
| = 10 | 7.1 | 0 | Peru, Ica Region | VIII (Severe) | 65.0 | January 15 |
| = 10 | 7.1 | 0 | Chile, Biobío Region | VII (Very strong) | 25.0 | May 22 |
| = 11 | 7.0 | 0 | Japan, off the east coast of Honshu | V (Moderate) | 15.0 | March 23 |
| = 11 | 7.0 | 0 | Chile, Araucanía Region | VIII (Severe) | 25.0 | June 20 |
| = 11 | 7.0 | 0 | Soviet Union, eastern Kamchatka, Russia | ( ) | 137.3 | July 25 |
| = 11 | 7.0 | 0 | Soviet Union, eastern Kamchatka, Russia | ( ) | 107.6 | October 28 |

- Note: At least 7.0 magnitude

== Notable events ==
=== January ===
January
- Strongest: 7.5 M_{w} Peru
- Deadliest: 7.5 M_{w} Peru; 63 deaths
- Total fatalities: 63

Number by magnitude
- 8.0–8.9: 0
- 7.0–7.9: 2
- 6.0–6.9: 9

| Date | Country and location | M_{w} | Depth (km) | MMI | Notes | Casualties | |
| Date | Country and location | M_{w} | Depth (km) | MMI | Notes | Dead | Injured |
|---|---|---|---|---|---|---|---|
| 2 | Chile, Arica y Parinacota Region | 6.2 | 146.2 | | | | |
| 3 | Italy, off the west coast of Calabria | 6.2 | 250.0 | | | | |
| 4 | France, Dikhil Region, Djibouti | 6.1 | 15.0 | VIII | | | |
| 9 | Afghanistan, Badakhshan Province | 6.6 | 225.4 | | | | |
| 13 | Peru, Arequipa Region | 7.5 | 130.0 | X | 63 people were killed and 200 were injured. Many homes were destroyed. | 63 | 200 |
| 15 | Peru, Ica Region | 7.1 | 65.0 | VIII | | | |
| 23 | Indonesia, southeast of Buru | 6.3 | 25.0 | V | Beginning of a series. | | |
| 23 | Indonesia, southeast of Buru | 6.2 | 25.0 | VI | | | |
| 23 | Indonesia, southeast of Buru | 6.2 | 35.0 | V | | | |
| 29 | Afghanistan, Badakhshan Province | 6.1 | 204.0 | | | | |
| 31 | Japan, southeast of Shikoku | 6.3 | 20.0 | | | | |

=== February ===
February
- Strongest: 6.6 M_{w} Australia
- Deadliest: 5.8 M_{w} Morocco; 13,100 deaths
- Total fatalities: 13,147

Number by magnitude
- 8.0–8.9: 0
- 7.0–7.9: 0
- 6.0–6.9: 7
- 5.0–5.9: 3

| Date | Country and location | M_{w} | Depth (km) | MMI | Notes | Casualties | |
| Date | Country and location | M_{w} | Depth (km) | MMI | Notes | Dead | Injured |
|---|---|---|---|---|---|---|---|
| 2 | China, Gansu province | 5.3 | 0.0 | VI | Some homes were destroyed. Unknown depth. | | |
| 3 | New Zealand, Gisborne District | 6.4 | 85.0 | | | | |
| 4 | Australia, east of New Ireland (island), Papua and New Guinea | 6.6 | 50.0 | V | | | |
| 4 | Japan, off the east coast of Honshu | 6.1 | 25.0 | | | | |
| 9 | Indonesia, southeast of Buru | 6.1 | 35.0 | | Foreshock. | | |
| 9 | Indonesia, southeast of Buru | 6.5 | 35.0 | VI | | | |
| 19 | Afghanistan, Badakhshan Province | 6.4 | 207.9 | | | | |
| 21 | France, Bouïra Province, Algeria | 5.6 | 33.0 | | 47 people were killed and a further 88 were injured. Some damage was caused. | 47 | 88 |
| 24 | United Kingdom, Solomon Islands | 6.2 | 50.0 | V | | | |
| 29 | Morocco, offshore Agadir | 5.8 | 15.0 | IX | 13,100 deaths and 25,000 people were injured in the 1960 Agadir earthquake. Agadir sustained heavy damage. Costs were $120 million (1960 rate). | 13,100 | 25,000 |

=== March ===
March
- Strongest: 8.0 M_{w} Japan
- Total fatalities: 0

Number by magnitude
- 8.0–8.9: 1
- 7.0–7.9: 2
- 6.0–6.9: 12

| Date | Country and location | M_{w} | Depth (km) | MMI | Notes | Casualties | |
| Date | Country and location | M_{w} | Depth (km) | MMI | Notes | Dead | Injured |
|---|---|---|---|---|---|---|---|
| 4 | Japan, off the south coast of Kyushu | 6.5 | 132.2 | | | | |
| 5 | Indonesia, east of Halmahera | 6.6 | 30.0 | VII | | | |
| 6 | Mexico, Gulf of California | 6.1 | 15.0 | | | | |
| 8 | New Hebrides, Vanuatu | 7.2 | 242.7 | | | | |
| 9 | Peru, Arequipa Region | 6.1 | 116.3 | | | | |
| 13 | Colombia, Choco Department | 6.1 | 15.0 | | | | |
| 20 | Japan, off the east coast of Honshu | 8.0 | 15.0 | VI | Some damage was caused. | | |
| 21 | Japan, off the east coast of Honshu | 6.1 | 15.0 | | Aftershock. | | |
| 23 | Japan, off the east coast of Honshu | 7.0 | 15.0 | V | Aftershock. | | |
| 23 | Japan, off the east coast of Honshu | 6.4 | 15.0 | | Aftershock. | | |
| 27 | Mexico, off the coast of Jalisco | 6.0 | 15.0 | V | | | |
| 28 | Panama, south of | 6.3 | 25.0 | VI | | | |
| 29 | New Hebrides, Vanuatu | 6.7 | 10.0 | VI | | | |
| 29 | Australia, off the east coast of Papua and New Guinea | 6.0 | 50.0 | V | | | |
| 31 | Mexico, Gulf of California | 6.0 | 15.0 | | | | |

=== April ===
April
- Strongest: 6.7 M_{w} Indonesia
- Deadliest: 5.9 M_{w} Iran; 420 deaths
- Total fatalities: 420

Number by magnitude
- 8.0–8.9: 0
- 7.0–7.9: 0
- 6.0–6.9: 3
- 5.0–5.9: 2

| Date | Country and location | M_{w} | Depth (km) | MMI | Notes | Casualties | |
| Date | Country and location | M_{w} | Depth (km) | MMI | Notes | Dead | Injured |
|---|---|---|---|---|---|---|---|
| 13 | China, Jilin province | 5.7 | 20.0 | VIII | 29 homes were destroyed. | | |
| 24 | Indonesia, Java Sea | 6.4 | 607.1 | | | | |
| 24 | Iran, Fars province | 5.9 | 15.0 | VII | 420 deaths were caused and property damage was extensive with costs of $20 million (1960 rate). | 420 | |
| 29 | Indonesia, Gulf of Tomini | 6.7 | 100.0 | VIII | 50 homes were destroyed. | | |
| 29 | Indonesia, Gulf of Tomini | 6.0 | 35.0 | | | | |

=== May ===
May
- Strongest: 9.5 M_{w} Chile
- Deadliest: 9.5 M_{w} Chile; 2,226 deaths
- Total fatalities: 2,235+

Number by magnitude
- 9.0+: 1
- 8.0–8.9: 1
- 7.0–7.9: 2
- 6.0–6.9: 14

| Date | Country and location | M_{w} | Depth (km) | MMI | Notes | Casualties | |
| Date | Country and location | M_{w} | Depth (km) | MMI | Notes | Dead | Injured |
|---|---|---|---|---|---|---|---|
| 11 | Indonesia, east of Seram | 6.2 | 35.0 | VI | | | |
| 18 | Japan, Ryukyu Islands | 6.5 | 59.4 | | | | |
| 19 | Afghanistan, Badakhshan Province | 6.5 | 98.4 | | | | |
| 20 | Australia, north of Norfolk Island | 6.5 | 15.0 | V | | | |
| 21 | Chile, Biobío Region | 8.1 | 25.0 | VIII | The 1960 Concepción earthquakes were large foreshocks to the 1960 Valdivia earthquake. At least 1 person died in this event and at least 101 were injured. Some damage was caused. To prevent cluttering only aftershocks above M 6.5 will be listed. | 1+ | 101+ |
| 21 | Chile, Biobío Region | 6.6 | 25.0 | | Foreshock. | | |
| 22 | Chile, Biobío Region | 7.1 | 25.0 | VII | Foreshock. | | |
| 22 | Chile, Biobío Region | 6.8 | 25.0 | VII | Foreshock. | | |
| 22 | Chile, Araucanía Region | 7.8 | 25.0 | X | Foreshock. | | |
| 22 | Chile, Biobío Region | 9.5 | 25.0 | XII | The 1960 Valdivia earthquake was the largest event recorded by a seismograph. Chile was left with major destruction from the earthquake and a large tsunami which swept across the Pacific. 2.226 people were killed and 3,000 were injured. 58,622 homes were destroyed. Damage costs were $1 billion (1960 rate). Only aftershocks above magnitude 6.5 will be listed to prevent cluttering. | 2,226 | 3,000 |
| 23 | Chile, off the coast of Araucanía Region | 6.5 | 20.0 | VI | Aftershock. | | |
| 23 | Chile, Los Ríos Region | 6.9 | 20.0 | | Aftershock. | | |
| 24 | New Zealand, off the west coast of South Island | 6.2 | 15.0 | | | | |
| 24 | Chile, Magallanes Region | 6.0 | 15.0 | | Not an aftershock of the 1960 Valdivia earthquake. | | |
| 25 | Chile, off the coast of Aysén Region | 6.7 | 20.0 | | Aftershock. | | |
| 26 | Albania, Korçë County | 6.2 | 20.0 | VIII | 8 people were killed and some damage was caused. | 8 | |
| 26 | Chile, Los Lagos Region | 6.9 | 0.0 | | Aftershock. Depth unknown. | | |
| 31 | United Kingdom, Barbuda, Antigua and Barbuda | 6.2 | 30.0 | VII | | | |

=== June ===
June
- Strongest: 7.8 M_{w} Chile
- Total fatalities: 0

Number by magnitude
- 8.0–8.9: 0
- 7.0–7.9: 2
- 6.0–6.9: 10

| Date | Country and location | M_{w} | Depth (km) | MMI | Notes | Casualties | |
| Date | Country and location | M_{w} | Depth (km) | MMI | Notes | Dead | Injured |
|---|---|---|---|---|---|---|---|
| 2 | Australia, East New Britain Province, Papua and New Guinea | 6.3 | 25.0 | VII | | | |
| 6 | United States, off the coast of northern California | 6.0 | 15.0 | VI | | | |
| 6 | Chile, Aysén Region | 7.8 | 15.0 | VIII | Aftershock of 1960 Valdivia earthquake. | | |
| 9 | New Hebrides, Vanuatu | 6.1 | 15.0 | | | | |
| 10 | Indonesia, Tanimbar Islands | 6.1 | 35.0 | | | | |
| 10 | Tonga | 6.1 | 35.0 | | | | |
| 11 | Bolivia, Potosí Department | 6.2 | 287.2 | | | | |
| 11 | Australia, D'Entrecasteaux Islands, Papua and New Guinea | 6.6 | 30.0 | rowspan="2"| Doublet earthquake. | | | |
| 11 | Australia, D'Entrecasteaux Islands, Papua and New Guinea | 6.6 | 30.0 | VIII | | | |
| 15 | Indonesia, Papua (province) | 6.1 | 20.0 | VI | | | |
| 20 | Chile, Araucanía Region | 7.0 | 25.0 | VIII | Aftershock of 1960 Valdivia earthquake. | | |
| 20 | Chile, Araucanía Region | 6.9 | 25.0 | IX | Aftershock of 1960 Valdivia earthquake. | | |

=== July ===
July
- Strongest: 7.0 M_{w} Soviet Union
- Total fatalities: 0

Number by magnitude
- 8.0–8.9: 0
- 7.0–7.9: 1
- 6.0–6.9: 11

| Date | Country and location | M_{w} | Depth (km) | MMI | Notes | Casualties | |
| Date | Country and location | M_{w} | Depth (km) | MMI | Notes | Dead | Injured |
|---|---|---|---|---|---|---|---|
| 4 | Canada, south of Haida Gwaii | 6.5 | 15.0 | | | | |
| 6 | Afghanistan, Badakhshan Province | 6.6 | 205.1 | | | | |
| 10 | Indonesia, south of Nias | 6.3 | 30.0 | V | | | |
| 13 | Mexico, Veracruz | 6.9 | 130.7 | | | | |
| 14 | Ethiopia, Oromia Region | 6.3 | 25.0 | | | | |
| 18 | Australia, off the east coast of New Britain, Papua and New Guinea | 6.0 | 35.0 | V | | | |
| 20 | New Hebrides, Vanuatu | 6.0 | 65.0 | | | | |
| 25 | Soviet Union, off the east coast of Kamchatka, Russia | 6.5 | 20.0 | V | Foreshock. | | |
| 25 | Soviet Union, eastern Kamchatka, Russia | 7.0 | 137.3 | | | | |
| 29 | New Hebrides, Vanuatu | 6.0 | 15.0 | | | | |
| 29 | Japan, off the east coast of Honshu | 6.8 | 53.4 | VI | | | |
| 31 | Australia, West New Britain Province, Papua and New Guinea | 6.7 | 25.0 | VIII | | | |

=== August ===
August
- Strongest: 6.7 M_{w} Chile
- Total fatalities: 0

Number by magnitude
- 8.0–8.9: 0
- 7.0–7.9: 0
- 6.0–6.9: 6

| Date | Country and location | M_{w} | Depth (km) | MMI | Notes | Casualties | |
| Date | Country and location | M_{w} | Depth (km) | MMI | Notes | Dead | Injured |
|---|---|---|---|---|---|---|---|
| 2 | France, southeast of the Loyalty Islands, New Caledonia | 6.5 | 82.1 | | | | |
| 4 | United States, Rat Islands, Alaska | 6.5 | 18.6 | | | | |
| 13 | Chile, off the coast of Los Lagos Region | 6.7 | 25.0 | V | Aftershock of 1960 Valdivia earthquake. | | |
| 20 | Guatemala, Retalhuleu Department | 6.0 | 75.0 | | | | |
| 24 | Soviet Union, off the east coast of Kamchatka, Russia | 6.0 | 15.0 | | | | |
| 27 | Soviet Union, Kuril Islands, Russia | 6.1 | 170.9 | | | | |

=== September ===
September
- Strongest: 6.6 M_{w} United States
- Deadliest: 6.5 M_{w} (Democratic Republic of the Congo) Republic of the Congo; 24 deaths
- Total fatalities: 24

Number by magnitude
- 8.0–8.9: 0
- 7.0–7.9: 0
- 6.0–6.9: 8

| Date | Country and location | M_{w} | Depth (km) | MMI | Notes | Casualties | |
| Date | Country and location | M_{w} | Depth (km) | MMI | Notes | Dead | Injured |
|---|---|---|---|---|---|---|---|
| 1 | New Hebrides, Malakula, Vanuatu | 6.1 | 30.0 | rowspan="2"| Doublet earthquake. | | | |
| 1 | New Hebrides, Malakula, Vanuatu | 6.1 | 30.0 | VI | | | |
| 2 | China, Xizang province | 6.0 | 20.0 | VII | | | |
| 3 | Australia, west of Bougainville Island, Papua and New Guinea | 6.4 | 423.4 | III | | | |
| 19 | Colombia, Choco Department | 6.3 | 15.0 | VII | | | |
| 22 | (Democratic Republic of the Congo) Republic of the Congo, South Kivu | 6.5 | 13.7 | VIII | 24 people were killed and many homes were damaged. | 24 | |
| 22 | (Democratic Republic of the Congo) Republic of the Congo, South Kivu | 6.3 | 15.0 | VIII | Aftershock. | | |
| 29 | United States, Northern Mariana Islands | 6.6 | 419.5 | | | | |

=== October ===
October
- Strongest: 7.0 M_{w} Soviet Union
- Total fatalities: 0

Number by magnitude
- 8.0–8.9: 0
- 7.0–7.9: 1
- 6.0–6.9: 10

| Date | Country and location | M_{w} | Depth (km) | MMI | Notes | Casualties | |
| Date | Country and location | M_{w} | Depth (km) | MMI | Notes | Dead | Injured |
|---|---|---|---|---|---|---|---|
| 7 | Indonesia, Tanimbar Islands | 6.7 | 35.0 | VI | | | |
| 8 | North Korea, off the east coast of | 6.8 | 607.5 | II | | | |
| 9 | Japan, Aomori Prefecture, Honshu | 6.2 | 89.2 | | | | |
| 13 | Soviet Union, eastern Kamchatka, Russia | 6.4 | 36.2 | VI | | | |
| 14 | United States, Andreanof Islands, Alaska | 6.5 | 35.7 | | | | |
| 22 | United Kingdom, Solomon Islands | 6.3 | 65.0 | VI | | | |
| 28 | Soviet Union, eastern Kamchatka, Russia | 7.0 | 107.6 | | | | |
| 28 | Japan, off the east coast of Honshu | 6.1 | 25.0 | | | | |
| 30 | Chile, Antofagasta Region | 6.2 | 35.0 | VI | Foreshock. | | |
| 30 | Chile, Antofagasta Region | 6.8 | 95.0 | | | | |
| 31 | Japan, Volcano Islands | 6.9 | 25.0 | | | | |

=== November ===
November
- Strongest: 7.6 M_{w} Peru
- Deadliest: 7.6 M_{w} Peru; 66 deaths
- Total fatalities: 67+

Number by magnitude
- 8.0–8.9: 0
- 7.0–7.9: 3
- 6.0–6.9: 9

| Date | Country and location | M_{w} | Depth (km) | MMI | Notes | Casualties | |
| Date | Country and location | M_{w} | Depth (km) | MMI | Notes | Dead | Injured |
|---|---|---|---|---|---|---|---|
| 1 | Chile, off the coast of Araucanía Region | 7.4 | 20.0 | V | Aftershock of 1960 Valdivia earthquake. At least 1 person was killed and some damage was caused. | 1+ | |
| 2 | United Kingdom, Santa Cruz Islands, Solomon Islands | 6.3 | 15.0 | | | | |
| 5 | Greece, Epirus (region) | 6.0 | 20.0 | VI | | | |
| 6 | Soviet Union, off the east coast of Kamchatka, Russia | 6.2 | 33.9 | VI | | | |
| 9 | China, Sichuan province | 6.3 | 25.0 | IX | Many homes were destroyed. | | |
| 9 | Chile, Antofagasta Region | 6.2 | 35.0 | VI | | | |
| 10 | Indonesia, Papua (province) | 6.8 | 100.0 | | | | |
| 13 | United States, Fox Islands (Alaska) | 6.8 | 22.1 | | | | |
| 20 | Peru, off the north coast of | 7.6 | 15.0 | IX | A tsunami was triggered by the November 1960 Peru earthquake. 66 people were killed and another 2 were injured. Damage costs were $550,000 (1960 rate). | 66 | 2 |
| 23 | United Kingdom, south of Fiji | 6.6 | 25.0 | | Foreshock. | | |
| 24 | Australia, off the east coast of New Ireland (island), Papua and New Guinea | 6.1 | 65.0 | V | | | |
| 24 | United Kingdom, south of Fiji | 7.2 | 30.0 | | | | |

=== December ===
December
- Strongest: 7.3 M_{w} Chile
- Total fatalities: 0

Number by magnitude
- 8.0–8.9: 0
- 7.0–7.9: 1
- 6.0–6.9: 7

| Date | Country and location | M_{w} | Depth (km) | MMI | Notes | Casualties | |
| Date | Country and location | M_{w} | Depth (km) | MMI | Notes | Dead | Injured |
|---|---|---|---|---|---|---|---|
| 2 | Chile, Antofagasta Region | 7.3 | 35.0 | VIII | | | |
| 2 | Chile, Antofagasta Region | 6.8 | 35.0 | | Aftershock. | | |
| 3 | Mongolia, Ömnögovi Province | 6.8 | 20.0 | VIII | | | |
| 6 | Costa Rica, Puntarenas Province | 6.2 | 35.0 | VI | | | |
| 6 | Chile, Tarapacá Region | 6.1 | 49.6 | VI | This happened at exactly the same time as the previous event. | | |
| 11 | New Hebrides, Vanuatu | 6.1 | 65.0 | VI | | | |
| 14 | United Kingdom, Santa Cruz Islands, Solomon Islands | 6.0 | 25.0 | | | | |
| 22 | Australia, off the south coast of Bougainville Island, Papua and New Guinea | 6.1 | 423.5 | | | | |
