= 1996 Ston–Slano earthquake =

Strong earthquake in Dalmatia, Croatia

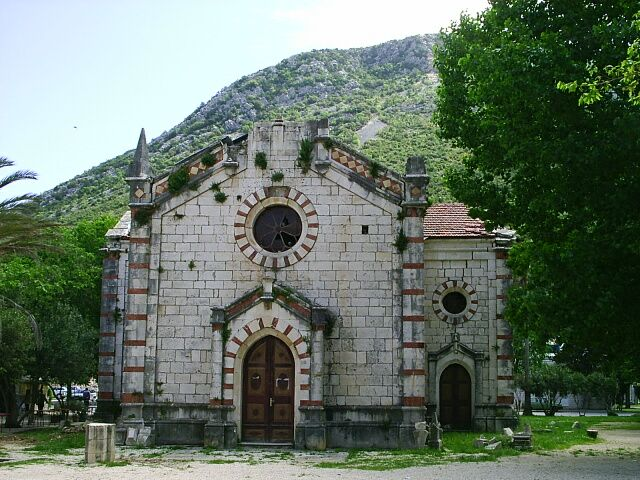
- The Church of St. Blasius was damaged in the earthquake

- Location within Croatia
- UTC time: 1996-09-05 20:44:08
- ISC event: 984504
- USGS-ANSS: ComCat
- Local date: 5 September 1996
- Local time: 22:44 CEST
- Magnitude: 6.0 M_{w} 6.0 M_{L} 5.6 mb
- Depth: 11 km (7 mi)
- Epicentre: 42.77°N 17.94°E
- Fault: Ston–Slano Fault Zone
- Areas affected: Southern Dalmatia (Dubrovnik–Neretva County, Split–Dalmatia County)
- Max. intensity: MMI VIII (Severe); MSK-64 VIII (Damaging)
- Peak acceleration: 0.643 g
- Landslides: Yes
- Aftershocks: 5.5 M_{w} 17 Sep
- Casualties: No deaths, several injuries

On 5 September 1996 at 22:44 local time (CEST, 20:44 UTC), southern Dalmatia, Croatia, was hit by a strong earthquake of moment magnitude 6.0. The epicentre was near the coastline of the Adriatic Sea, close to the village of Slano, roughly 15 kilometres (9.3 mi) northwest of Dubrovnik. The worst damage was of intensity VIII on the Medvedev–Sponheuer–Karnik scale, occurring in the epicentral area, but also another 25 km (16 mi) northwest, at the isthmus of the Pelješac peninsula, around the old town of Ston.

== Damage ==
Three villages were completely destroyed, and there was damage in much of southern Dalmatia, up to Zagvozd and Grabovac. About 1,400 buildings were damaged and 474 rendered uninhabitable in the epicentral area. Cracks of up to 10 cm (4 in) in width appeared in the Walls of Ston. Some of the destroyed buildings had been weakened by a M_{L}4.7 earthquake off Mljet in July 1995. Fortunately, there were no fatalities. However, several people were injured, and more than 2,000 were displaced according to the United States Geological Survey. According to the Croatian Radiotelevision, there were no injuries. Landslides and collapsed structures blocked the roads to the villages of Mravinca, Trnova and Podimoć. One of the aftershocks temporarily blocked the Adriatic Highway, the principal thoroughfare of the Dubrovnik region. Massive boulders were dislodged and rolled down the mountain, in one case colliding with a house. The earthquake reduced groundwater levels, and created a submarine spring between Ston and Doli, where the emitted soil and mud temporarily turned the sea red. The town of Ston took about a decade to recover from the effects of the earthquake.

== Earthquake ==
This was the largest earthquake with an epicentre in the Dubrovnik area since the violent 1667 Dubrovnik earthquake, and the peak horizontal acceleration (PGA) of 0.643 g measured at the Ston saltworks remains the highest observed in Croatia. The significant degree of soil amplification in Ston caused high PGA values of up to 0.313 g in some of the aftershocks as well. The rupture began on the reverse Slano Fault or possibly on the Pelješac Fault, beginning 4.5 km (2.8 mi) from Slano and continuing for about 20 km (12 mi) northwestwards to Ston, where the ground displacement reached 38 cm (15 in). Multiple faults were activated during the earthquake. The shock was felt up to 400 km (250 mi) away from the epicentre, and was followed by more than 1,800 aftershocks over the course of a year.

== Aftershocks ==
Significant aftershocks
Date	Time (UTC)	M	I	Depth	Ref.
5 September	21:43	4.9		10.8 km (6.7 mi)	
7 September	05:45	4.5		8.1 km (5.0 mi)	
9 September	15:57	5.3	VII	10.5 km (6.5 mi)	
17 September	13:45	5.4; 5.5	VII	10.0 km (6.2 mi)	
20 October	15:00	4.6		8.7 km (5.4 mi)	

== See also ==
- List of earthquakes in 1996
- List of earthquakes in Croatia
- 2020 Petrinja earthquake

== Sources ==
- Markušić, Snježana; Herak, Davorka; Ivančić, Ines; Sović, Ivica; Herak, Marijan; Prelogović, Eduard (1 December 1998). "Seismicity of Croatia in the period 1993–1996 and the Ston-Slano earthquake of 1996". Geofizika. 15 (1): 83–101. ISSN 0352-3659.
- Govorčin, Marin; Herak, Marijan; Matoš, Bojan; Pribičević, Boško; Vlahović, Igor (4 April 2020). "Constraints on Complex Faulting during the 1996 Ston–Slano (Croatia) Earthquake Inferred from the DInSAR, Seismological, and Geological Observations" (PDF). Remote Sensing. 12 (7): 1157. Bibcode:2020RemS...12.1157G. doi:10.3390/rs12071157.
- Herak, Marijan; Allegretti, Ivo; Herak, Davorka; Kuk, Krešimir; Kuk, Vlado; Marić, Krešimir; Markušić, Snježana; Stipčević, Josip (June 2010). "HVSR of ambient noise in Ston (Croatia): comparison with theoretical spectra and with the damage distribution after the 1996 Ston-Slano earthquake". Bulletin of Earthquake Engineering. 8 (3): 483–499. Bibcode:2010BuEE....8..483H. doi:10.1007/s10518-009-9121-x. S2CID 109901299.
