= 1996 Baotou earthquake =

6.4 Ms earthquake in Inner Mongolia, China

- Location within China
- UTC time: 1996-05-03 03:32:47
- ISC event: 962141
- USGS-ANSS: ComCat
- Local date: May 3, 1996
- Local time: 11:32:47 CST
- Magnitude: M_{s} 6.4
- Depth: 26 km (16 mi)
- Epicenter: 40.774°N 109.661°E
- Casualties: 26 dead

The 1996 Baotou earthquake (Chinese: 1996年包头地震) occurred on May 3, 1996, at 11:32 local time (03:32 UTC). The epicenter was located west of Baotou, Inner Mongolia, China. This M_{s} 6.4 earthquake killed 26 people, injured 453, and left 196,633 homeless.

The earthquake was located close to the western suburbs of Baotou, and it was considered a typical urban earthquake. A landslide in Hademen Gold Mine (哈德门金矿) caused six deaths. There was damage to electricity infrastructure. Liquefaction was reported in the low swamps along both sides of the Yellow River. Anomalies such as radon and mercury were observed in surrounding areas, such as Linhe and Baynnur, before the earthquake. Besides Inner Mongolia, the earthquake could be felt in Beijing, Shaanxi, and Shanxi of China as well as Mongolia itself. There was a large historical earthquake in 849 around the Hetao region, and some researchers located it in eastern Baotou.

The earthquake, which destroyed many old houses, led to the reconstruction of Baotou. In 2002, the Baotou Municipal Government was awarded by UN-HABITAT for the improvements in shelter and the urban environments.
