= 1996 Sulawesi earthquake =

Earthquake in Indonesia

- Location within Sulawesi Location within Indonesia
- UTC time: 1996-01-01 08:05:10
- ISC event: 939295
- USGS-ANSS: ComCat
- Local date: January 1, 1996
- Local time: 16:05 CIT
- Duration: ~30 seconds
- Magnitude: 7.9 M_{w}
- Depth: 24.0 km (14.9 mi)
- Epicenter: 0.729°S 119.931°E
- Fault: North Sulawesi Trench
- Type: Thrust
- Areas affected: Sulawesi, Indonesia
- Total damage: $1.2M USD
- Max. intensity: MMI X (Extreme)
- Tsunami: 2–4 m (6.6–13.1 ft)
- Casualties: 9 dead, 63 injured

On January 1, 1996, at 4:05 p.m. Central Indonesia Time, an earthquake with an epicenter in the Makassar Strait struck north of Minahasa on the island of Sulawesi, Indonesia. The earthquake measured 7.9 on the moment magnitude scale and was centered off Tolitoli Regency in Central Sulawesi, or 25 km from the Tonggolobibi village. A tsunami of 2–4 m (6.6–13.1 ft) was triggered by this earthquake as a result. At least 350 buildings were badly damaged, nine people died and 63 people were injured.

== Tectonic setting ==
The North Sulawesi Trench is a subduction zone parallel to the Minahasa Peninsula where the Sunda plate dives beneath the Molucca Sea plate at a rate of 4 cm/yr. Here, three major tectonic plates, the Sunda, Australian and Philippine Sea plates interact in a complex manner, broken up into several smaller microplates. The North Sulawesi Subduction Zone joins the Palu-Koro Fault at its westernmost tip.

== Earthquake ==
The thrust fault which this earthquake occurred along had a very shallow dip angle of 7°, during the event, a 90 km × 60 km (56 mi × 37 mi) section of it had ruptured. An average slip was estimated at 1.8 meters. The earthquake took place along a relay zone between the North Sulawesi Trench and Palu-Koro Fault. The strike-slip component of this oblique-thrust event was a result of interaction with the Palu-Koro Fault. The rupture process took roughly 30 seconds. On Pangalasean Island, uplift of 0.3–0.5 m (0.98–1.64 ft) was determined.

Two aftershocks in July, a magnitude 6.6 and 7.0 on the 16th and 22nd struck about 50 km northeast of the January mainshock. This event was larger but far less deadly compared to the M_{w} 7.5 Sulawesi earthquake in 2018 to the south. The mainshock resulted in a large coulomb stress transfer component around the Palu-Koro Fault. Many additional aftershocks were triggered along the Palu-Koro Fault following the mainshock. There was also an increased rate in seismicity around the island after the 1996 shock. A number of magnitude 6.0+ earthquakes occurred along the fault and was triggered after the 1996 thrust mainshock. In May and October 1998, two earthquakes measuring 6.6 and 6.0 M_{w}, respectively, occurred near the Palu–Koro Fault. The former event was the result of strike-slip faulting while the latter displayed thrusting on a shallow, southeast dipping fault. Stress transfer later brought the Palu-Koro Fault closer to rupture and eventually failed, causing the 2018 earthquake.

== Tsunami ==
The tsunami inundated more than 100 km of coastline along with Northern Sulawesi between 5–10 minutes after the tremor. The run-up heights of these waves were between 1.6–3.4 m (5.2–11.2 ft), according to eyewitness. More than 400 houses in the village of Tonggolobibi were destroyed when the waves swept through.
The water destroyed 183 houses and damaged 228 units around the Bangkir-Tolitoli area. About 100 km (62 mi) of coastline was affected, there were no reports of the tsunami recorded outside of Sulawesi, thus inferring that the tsunami was localized. The tsunami penetrated 200 m (660 ft) up riverbeds and carried five boats, including two 500-ton motorboats 250 meters onshore. Since the tsunami occurred during a high tide of 0.59 m (1.9 ft), and there was subsidence of the land of about 0.7 m (2.3 ft), estimating the height of the tsunami was challenging.

== See also ==
- List of earthquakes in 1996
- List of earthquakes in Indonesia
- 1968 Sulawesi earthquake
- 1969 Sulawesi earthquake
- 2021 West Sulawesi earthquake
