= Association of Medical Doctors of Asia =

Association of Medical Doctors of Asia (AMDA) is an international not-for-profit organization that works towards better healthcare for refugees and also helps the victims of natural disasters in Asia, Africa, and central Europe.

The organization was founded in 1984 with doctors constituting from countries including Japan, India, and Thailand. The organization operates with their Asian Multinational Medical Missions (AMMMs) and has medical staff from different nationalities working together at a refugee camp with the local teams. The organization was founded when in Thailand, at the Cambodia border, mostly western doctors were found to be working with refugees from Cambodia. It was felt that regional Asian doctors should participate in regional relief activities.

AMDA is headquartered in Japan and also sponsors studies around healthcare, and runs hotlines for providing health-related information and work with local organizations run health awareness campaigns.
