= Lae =

- City
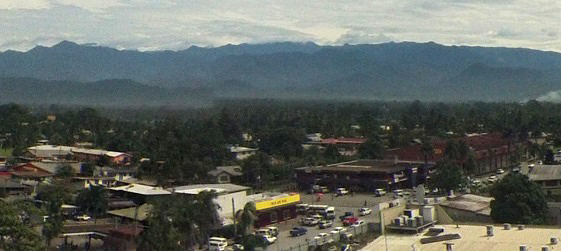
- Lae City from the top of the Telikom Building (2014)

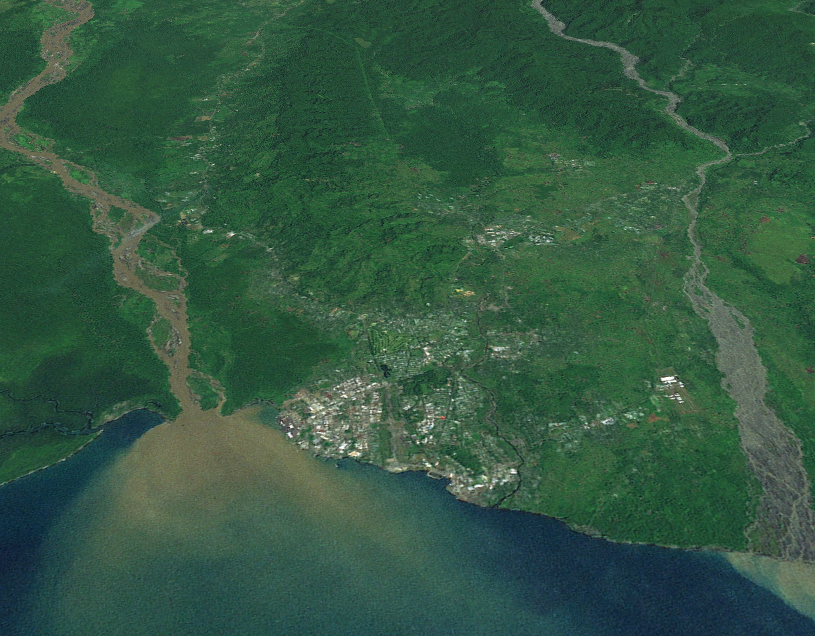

- Location within Papua New Guinea
- Coordinates: 06°43′49″S 147°00′03″E
- Country: Papua New Guinea
- Province: Morobe
- District: Lae
- LLG: Lae Urban LLG

Area
  - City: 40.3 km^{2} (15.6 sq mi)
- Elevation: 8 m (26 ft)

Population (2023)
  - City: 104,000
  - Rank: 2nd
  - Density: 2,580/km^{2} (6,680/sq mi)
  - Urban: 173,000
- Time zone: UTC+10 (PGT)
- Climate: Af

Lae (/ˈlɑːeɪ, ˈleɪi/, German: Preußen-Reede, later Lehe) is the capital of Morobe Province and is the second-largest city in Papua New Guinea. It is located near the delta of the Markham River on the northern coast of Huon Gulf. It is at the start of the Highlands Highway, which is the main land transport corridor between the Highlands Region and the coast. Lae is the largest cargo port of the country and is the industrial hub of Papua New Guinea. The city is known as the Garden City and home of the Papua New Guinea University of Technology.

== History ==
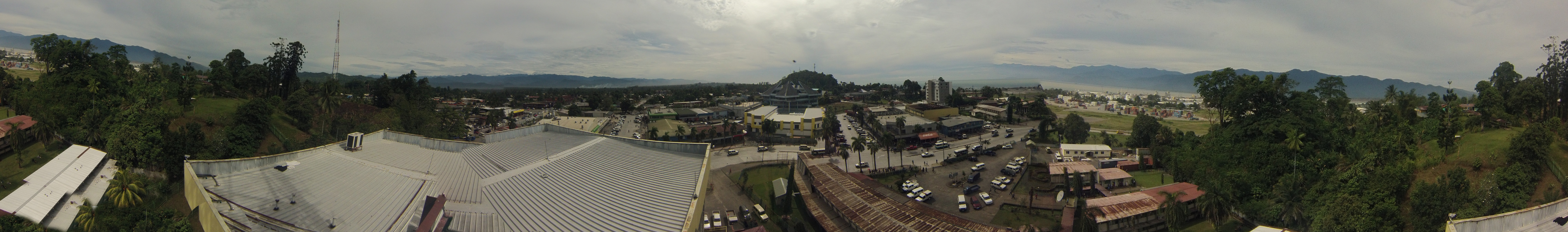
Panoramic photo of Lae city taken from top of the Hodgson Nagi (Telikom) building, Lae. Governors residence to the left. Port to the right. Taken 29 January 2014

Lucas (1972) divides the history of Lae into four periods; the mission phase (1886–1920), the gold phase (1926 until World War II), the timber and agricultural phase (until 1965) and the industrial boom (from 1965) with the opening of the Highlands Highway.

Between 1884 and 1918 the German New Guinea Company established trading posts in Kaiser Wilhelmsland, German New Guinea and on 12 July 1886, a German missionary, Johann Flierl, a pioneer missionary for the Southern Australian Lutheran Synod and the Neuendettelsau Mission Society, sailed to Simbang in Finschhafen, Kaiser-Wilhelmsland and arrived at Lae shortly after. The mission society provided clergy and religious education for Lutheran settlements in Missouri, Iowa and Ohio, Australia, and anywhere else "free thinking" Lutherans had settled.

After World War I, Eastern New Guinea came under British control (Australia) and many of the Germanic names were replaced by English or indigenous ones. Adolf Haven was then referred to as Morobe Harbour. Australian officials or kiaps were stationed at various locations within the area and in 1921 the military administration transitioned to a civilian administration, a gold prospector named Cecil John Levien was appointed District Officer (Kiap) of Morobe.

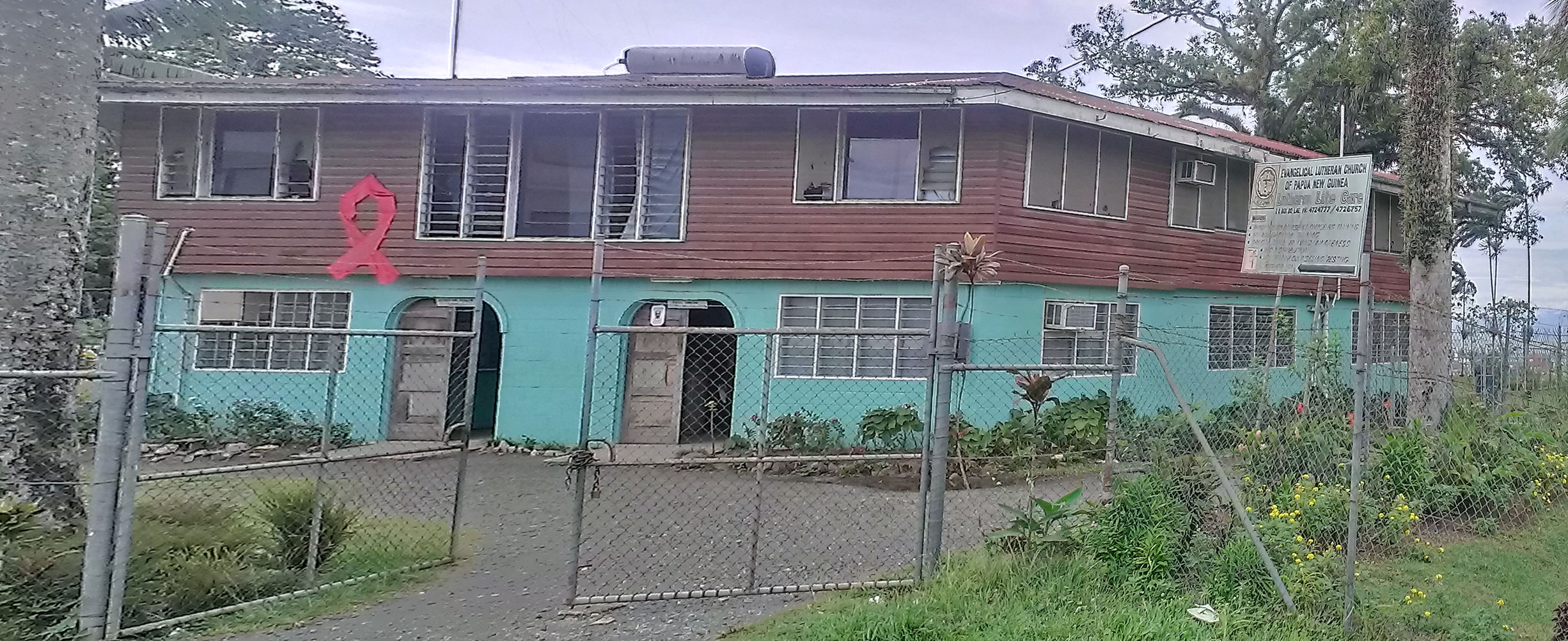
Evangelical Lutheran Church Lutheran Lite building in Top Town overlooking the Huon Gulf

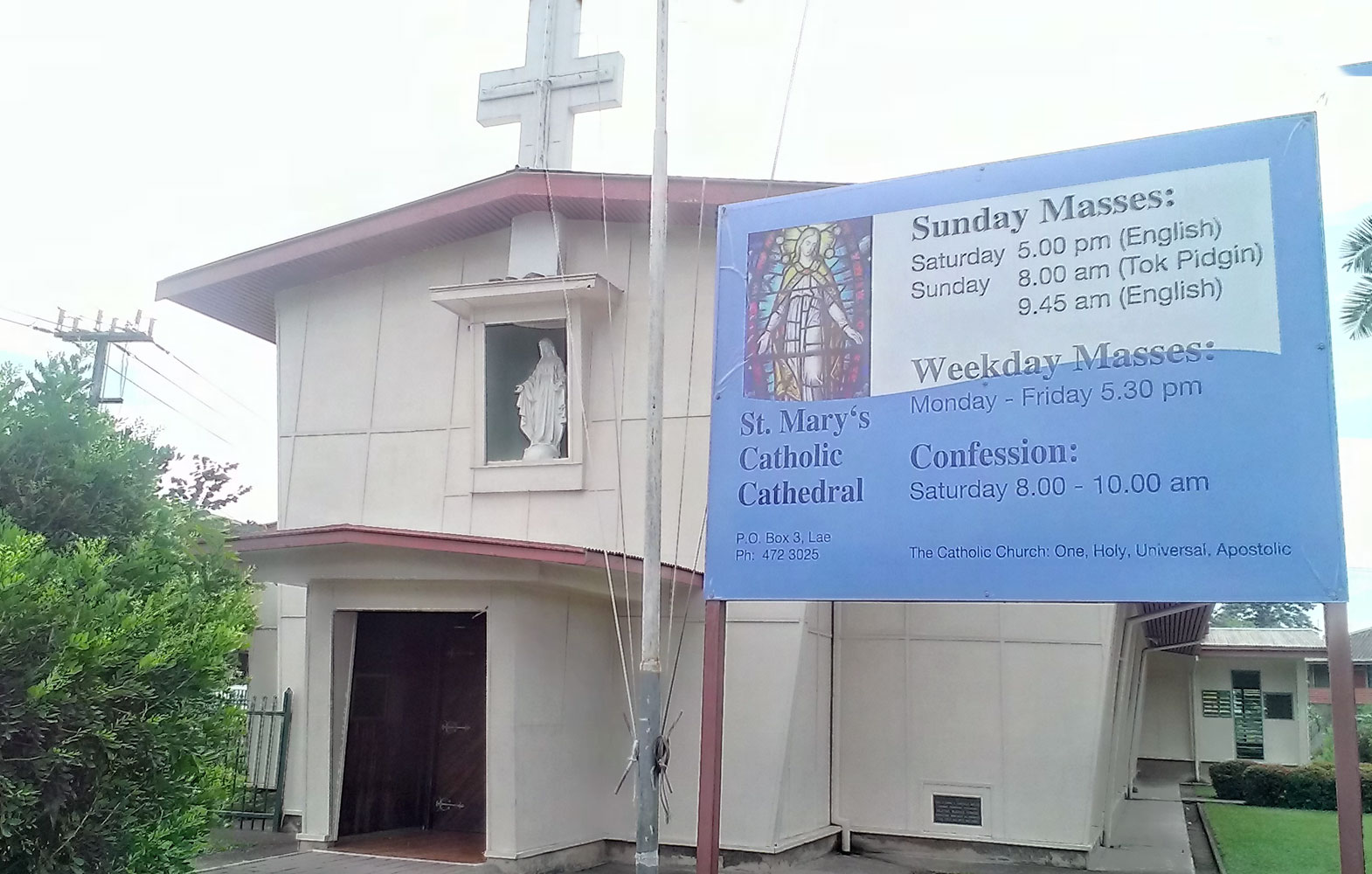
St. Mary Catholic Church, Top Town, Lae.

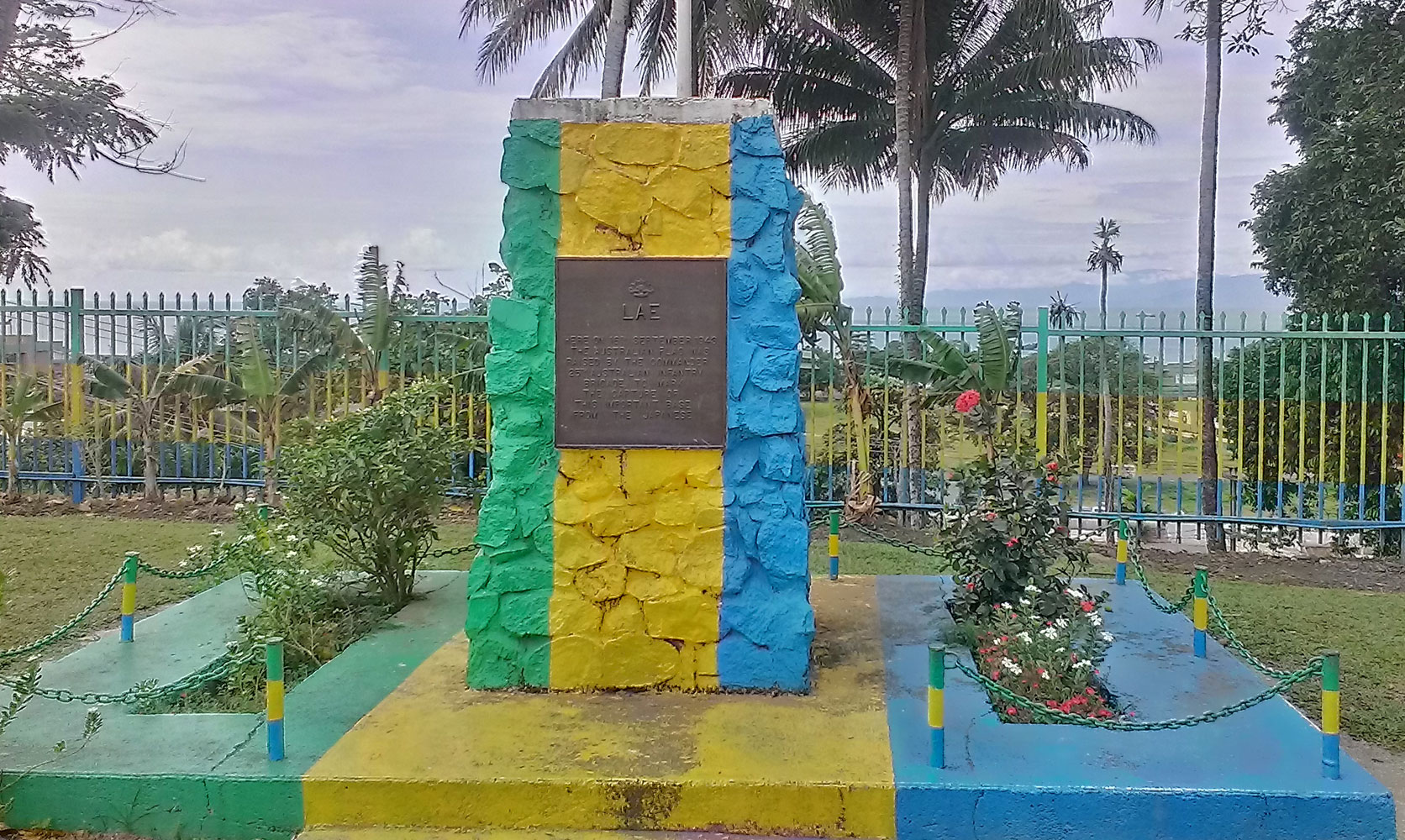
Monument at the old RSL building. Site marks the location when on 16 September 1943 Kenneth Eather from 25th Brigade raised the Australian flag following the defeat of the Japanese.

On 1 January 1923 Levien acquired a mining right for the area and shortly after formed a syndicate called Guinea Gold (No Liability). The Guinea Gold syndicate formed Guinea Airways Limited in November 1927. In 1927 Levien arranged for the construction of the airstrip at Lae to assist the gold mine productions around Wau.

Lae was declared a town under the New Guinea Boundaries Ordinance on 31 March 1931 at the height of the gold rush era and Lae became the prototype for New Guinean towns built up around airstrips. The Europeans lived to the East of Lae Airfield while the New Guineans lived to the West. Cargo arrived in Lae and then was transported by air to the goldfields in Wau.

In July 1937, Lae made world news when American aviator Amelia Earhart was last seen flying out of the airport on her way back to the United States. She was never seen again.

When the volcanic eruptions occurred in Rabaul in 1937, a decision was made to transfer the capital of the Territory of New Guinea to Lae. World War II impeded the transfer and the town was occupied by the Empire of Japan on 8 March 1942. Lae, Rabaul and Salamaua became the major Japanese bases in New Guinea.

The naval Battle of the Bismarck Sea in March 1943 was fought over the Japanese attempt to reinforce Lae with troops sent by sea from Rabaul, an attempt foiled by sustained Allied attack on the Japanese troop transports. In mid-1943, after defeats in the Kokoda Track campaign, the Battle of Buna–Gona and the Battle of Wau, the Japanese retreated to Lae and Salamaua. However, the Salamaua–Lae campaign involved many weeks of fierce fighting, before the town fell to the Allies on 16 September.

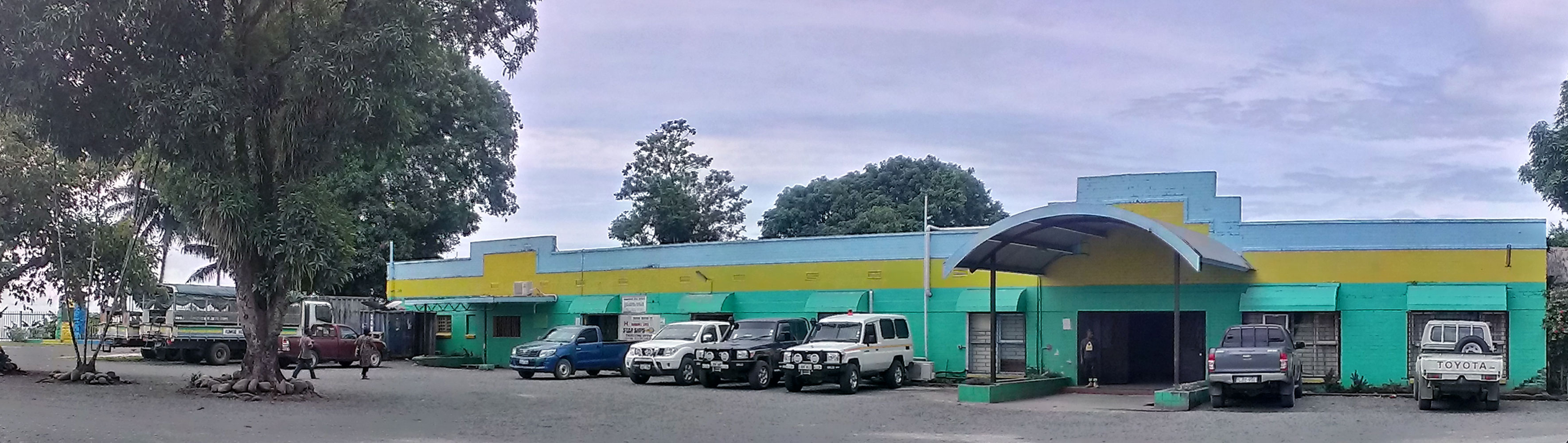
Old RSL building overlooking Huon Gulf.

In 1971 the Australian Colonial Administration established the first properly constituted Local Government of Lae town and in 1972 Lae was proclaimed a city. Lae's development after the war is directly linked to the development of the highlands. Coffee and tea were being grown and a port was needed. Later priority was given on road access, and the Highlands Highway came into existence. The mineral boom occurred in the 1980s and 1990s.

== Geology ==
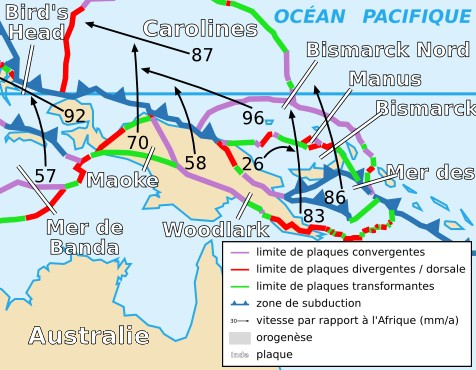
Papua New Guinea and tectonic plates: Pacific plate, Australian plate, Caroline plate, Banda Sea plate (as "Mer de Banda"), Woodlark plate, Bird's Head plate, Maoke plate, Solomon Sea plate, North Bismarck plate, South Bismarck plate and Manus plate (in French).

Lae is located on the Pacific Ring of Fire and geologic instability has produced numerous faults, resulting in earthquakes.

Lae sits between the larger Indo-Australian plate and the Pacific plate on the South Bismarck plate in the Ramu-Markham Fault Zone where the New Guinea Highlands Deforming Zone and South Bismarck tectonic plates are converging at up to 50 mm/yr. The city is caught in a giant geological vise and the seismic hazard is significant.

More than 15 years of measurements have been analysed with results indicating how rapidly Lae city and its survey network is deforming.

The Ramu-Markham Fault Zone, which follows the northern edge of the Markham Valley, is the active plate boundary between the South Bismarck plate and tectonostratigraphic terranes within the New Guinea Highlands Deforming Zone. The Ramu-Markham Fault Zone has generated large thrust earthquakes (e.g. 6 April 1999 MW 6.4, 16 km North of Lae, near Hobu, and 22 November 2007 MW 6.8, 110 km North of Lae). Geological evidence suggests that major earthquakes in pre-historic times have occurred in the Lae area, and that there is the potential for another large earthquake to occur anytime within the next 100 years (in).

=== Mount Lunaman ===
Mount Lunaman is 96 metres (315 ft) high and has a radio tower at the highest point marked by red fixed obstruction lights to assist navigation. At the base of Mount Lunaman at the southern and south-eastern face are the suburbs of Voco Point and Chinatown. The terraces are located to the West of Mount Lunaman.

Mount Lunaman is known to the locals as Lo' Wamung, which means "first hill", Hospital Hill and Fortress Hill by the German settlers.

Mount Lunaman and the Lae urban area have been the subject of several tectonic studies relating to plate shift.

Mount Lunaman was an important landmark for both Japanese and the Allies:

"The men of the South Australian battalion hammered and sawed vigorously at the top of the terrace. They were reconstructing, with captured Japanese tools, the skeleton of the cottage formerly used as the Japanese commander's sanctum. A hole beneath the door led by a tunnel to a labyrinth of passages and apertures which honeycombed Mount Lunaman".

After the war it was believed that Mount Lunaman contained the remains of many Japanese soldiers who defended Lae using tunnels:

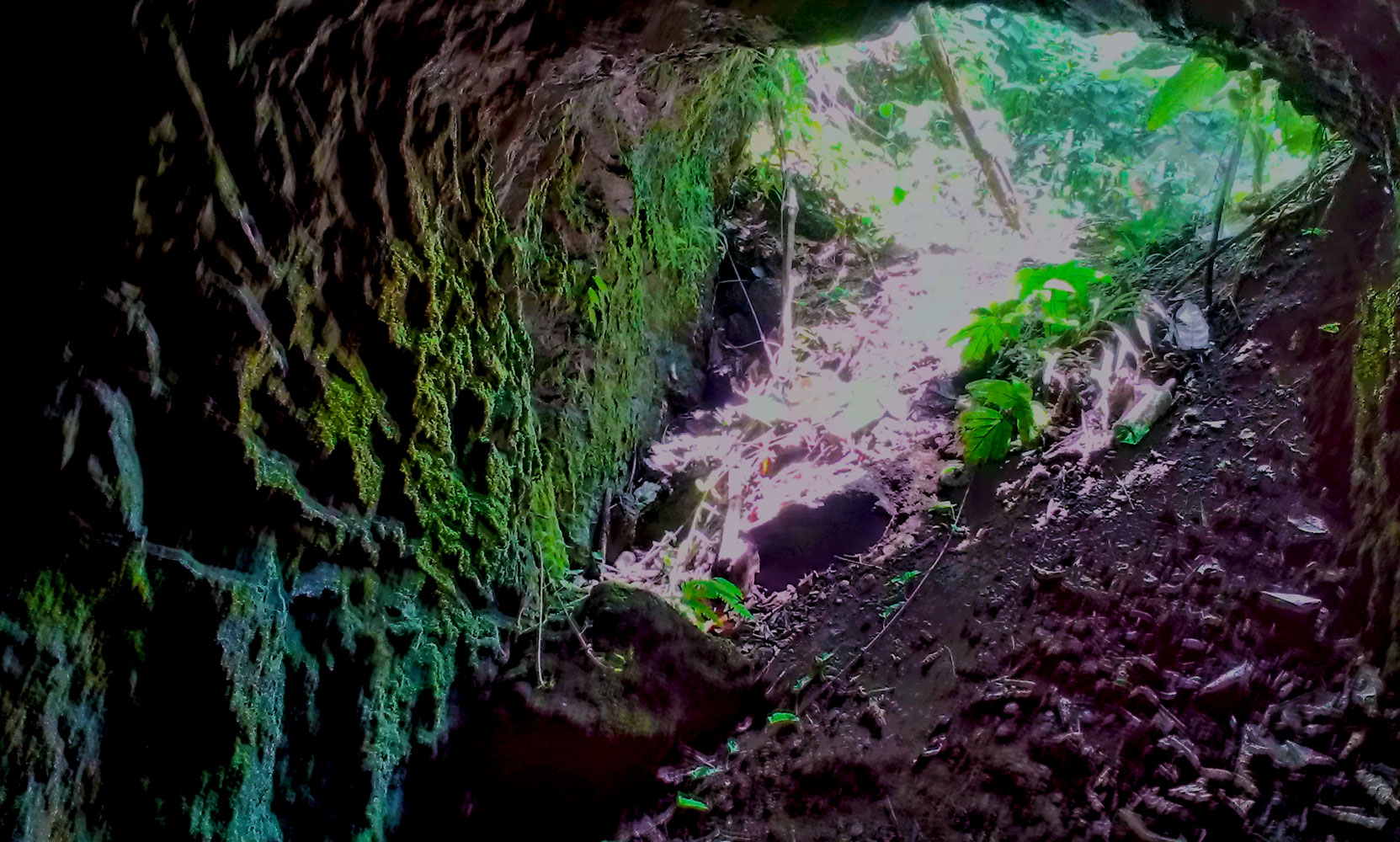
Still extant Japanese World War II tunnel in Mt Lunaman. Looking out towards Chinatown.

A Japanese tomb believed to contain bodies of hundreds of Lae defenders was bought by two South Australian men for 1 pound. The tomb lies under Mount Lunaman which is said to house a hospital and when the Japanese in tunnels refused to surrender to the Australian 7th Division and 9th Division troops in 1943 all entrances were sealed. In a 1971 NHK interview with the Japanese Army commander of Lae, he stated that the tunnels in the hill were only ever used for storage, and the Army had used the Lutheran Malahang Hospital some 10 km north of the town.

== Government ==
The Lae City Council is also known as Lae Urban Local-Level Government. It is an Urban Municipal Authority, responsible for the policy decisions, management and administration of the city, by way of providing the municipal services to the residents of the city.

Lae City Aims to become one of the Garden Cities of Asia Pacific Region by 2012, by creating a modern, safe, vibrant City, with a strong economy, whilst enhancing its cultural heritage, and by developing a Healthy, well Educated, Harmonious Community, which will enjoys a good living environment.

The Lae Urban Local-Level Government is a third-tier government. The political structure consists of the Lord Mayor as the head, who is elected by the people, with five elected, and three nominated Councilors. The six elected Councilors representing the six Wards in the city. The nominated Councilors represented the Chamber of Commerce, the Workers Federation Union, and the Women, Youth and Churches.

=== Roads ===
The Lae City has 137 kilometers of roads, which the National Government is responsible for the maintenance of the Independence Drive, the Markham Road, and the Milford Haven Road, while the Lae City Council maintains the rest of the roads in the city. Due to lack of funding, almost all the roads have deteriorated over the years.

=== Electricity ===
In recent years PNG, including Lae has been experiencing problems with electricity supply. . In May 2023 a memorandum of agreement between AG Investment and the Morobe Province Development Authority was signed for the Finschhafen District Hydropower Project.

== Climate ==
Lae features a tropical rainforest climate under Köppen's climate classification, more subject to the Intertropical Convergence Zone than the trade winds and with no cyclones so equatorial. The area experiences an extraordinary amount of precipitation, averaging roughly 4,500 millimetres (180 in) of rainfall annually. In fact in no month does Lae, on average, see less than 200 millimetres (7.9 in) of precipitation. Temperatures show little variance during a typical year in the city, with January temperatures averaging roughly 28 °C (82 °F) and July temperatures averaging 25 °C (77 °F).

Climate data for Lae
Month	Jan	Feb	Mar	Apr	May	Jun	Jul	Aug	Sep	Oct	Nov	Dec	Year
Mean daily maximum °C (°F)	31.5 (88.7)	31.5 (88.7)	31.0 (87.8)	30.5 (86.9)	29.8 (85.6)	28.8 (83.8)	28.1 (82.6)	28.0 (82.4)	28.7 (83.7)	29.6 (85.3)	30.5 (86.9)	31.1 (88.0)	29.9 (85.8)
Mean daily minimum °C (°F)	24.3 (75.7)	24.2 (75.6)	24.2 (75.6)	23.9 (75.0)	23.6 (74.5)	23.0 (73.4)	22.4 (72.3)	22.3 (72.1)	22.6 (72.7)	23.2 (73.8)	23.7 (74.7)	23.9 (75.0)	23.4 (74.1)
Average rainfall mm (inches)	241.6 (9.51)	239.9 (9.44)	281.1 (11.07)	347.4 (13.68)	348.9 (13.74)	502.8 (19.80)	477.9 (18.81)	516.9 (20.35)	360.9 (14.21)	442.4 (17.42)	334.9 (13.19)	338.2 (13.31)	4,432.9 (174.52)
Average rainy days	16	17	18	21	21	21	24	24	22	22	21	19	246
Source: World Meteorological Organisation

== Economy ==
=== Industry ===
Lae is strategically located in that it can supply the Highlands, Islands, Southern and Momase regions. Large businesses include:

- Mainland Holdings Ltd
- DuluxGroup (PNG) Ltd
- Consort Express Lines
- Paradise Foods Limited
- Halla Cement
- HBS PNG Limited
- iPi Group
- Trukai Rice
- SP Brewery
- Bismark Maritime
- South Pacific Steel
- Papindo Group of Companies
- Prima Smallgoods
- Lae Biscuit Factory
- Citylink Motel
- MMK Transport
- Barlow Industries Ltd
- Mapai Transport
- PNG Metal Fabricators Ltd
- Araweld Ltd
- Homestate Co-operation
- NCI Packaging (PNG) Ltd
- Esteens Deering (PNG) Ltd
- Niugini Electrical Ltd

== Markets ==
Lae City has a popular food market. This is due to the fact that the Morobe Province produces taros, bananas, sweet potatoes, yams, fruits and vegetables etc., which have been sought after by many Papua New Guineans as well as expatriates. The Lae Main Market also receives and sells foodstuff and vegetables from the Highlands Provinces. Apart from Lae Main Market, wards and mini-markets are also available to cater for the needs of the growing population of the city.

== Landmarks ==
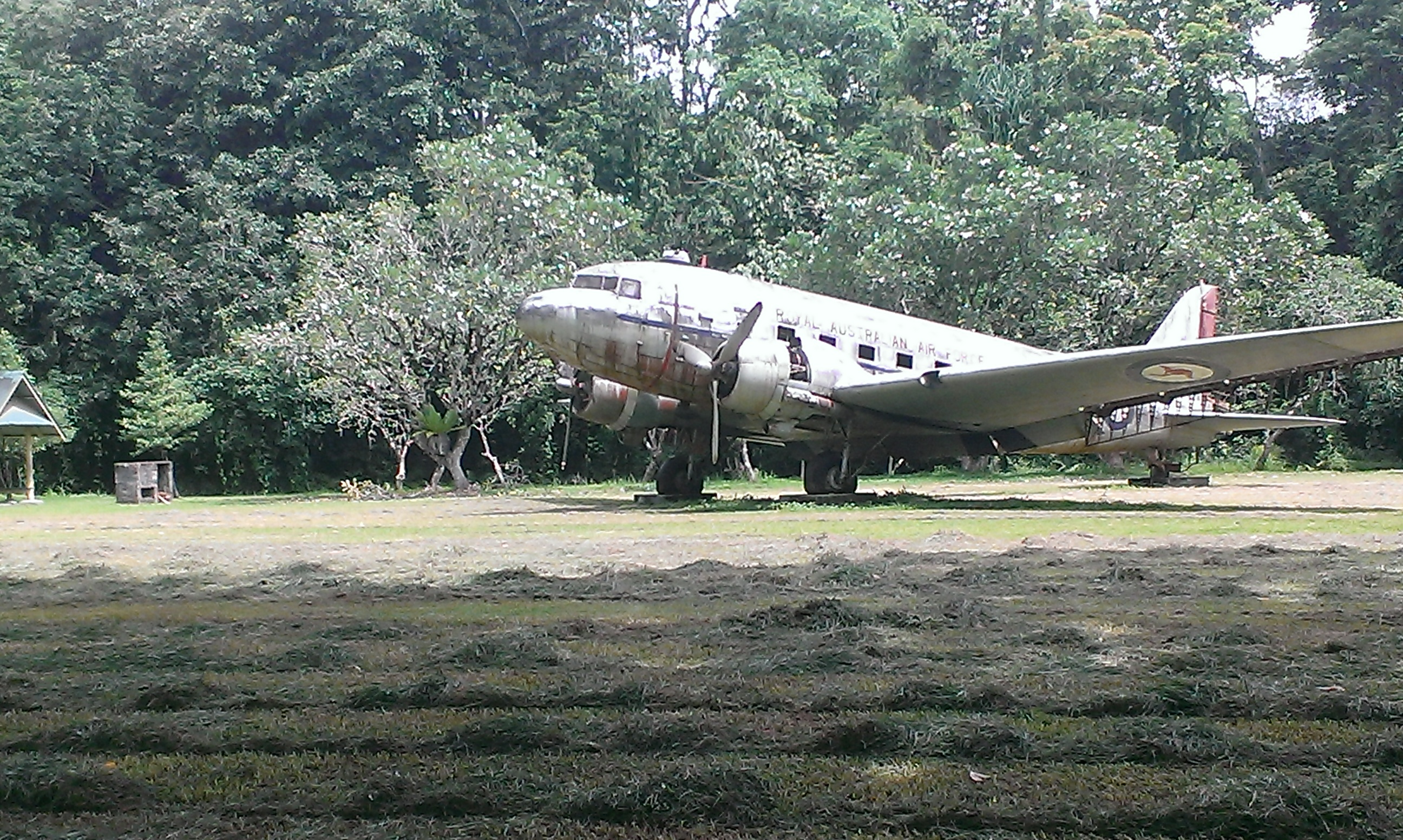
RAAF C47 located in Lae Botanical Gardens

=== University of Technology ===
The Papua New Guinea University of Technology is based 8 kilometres (5.0 mi) outside Lae and is the second largest university in PNG after its 'sister' university the University of Papua New Guinea in Port Moresby. While University of Papua New Guinea concentrates on the arts, pure sciences, law and medicine, the University of Technology focuses on research in technological or applied sciences. It is the only technological university in the South Pacific, outside Australia and New Zealand.

=== Lae International Hotel ===
Lae International Hotel is an important conference centre and has hosted some notable political figures over the years. Lae International Hotel (6°43′50″S 147°0′21″E) has 100 rooms, furnished with wooden furnitures and 4 luxury suites. It contains the Vanda Restaurant, Luluai's Italian Restaurant and Kokomo Coffee Shop.

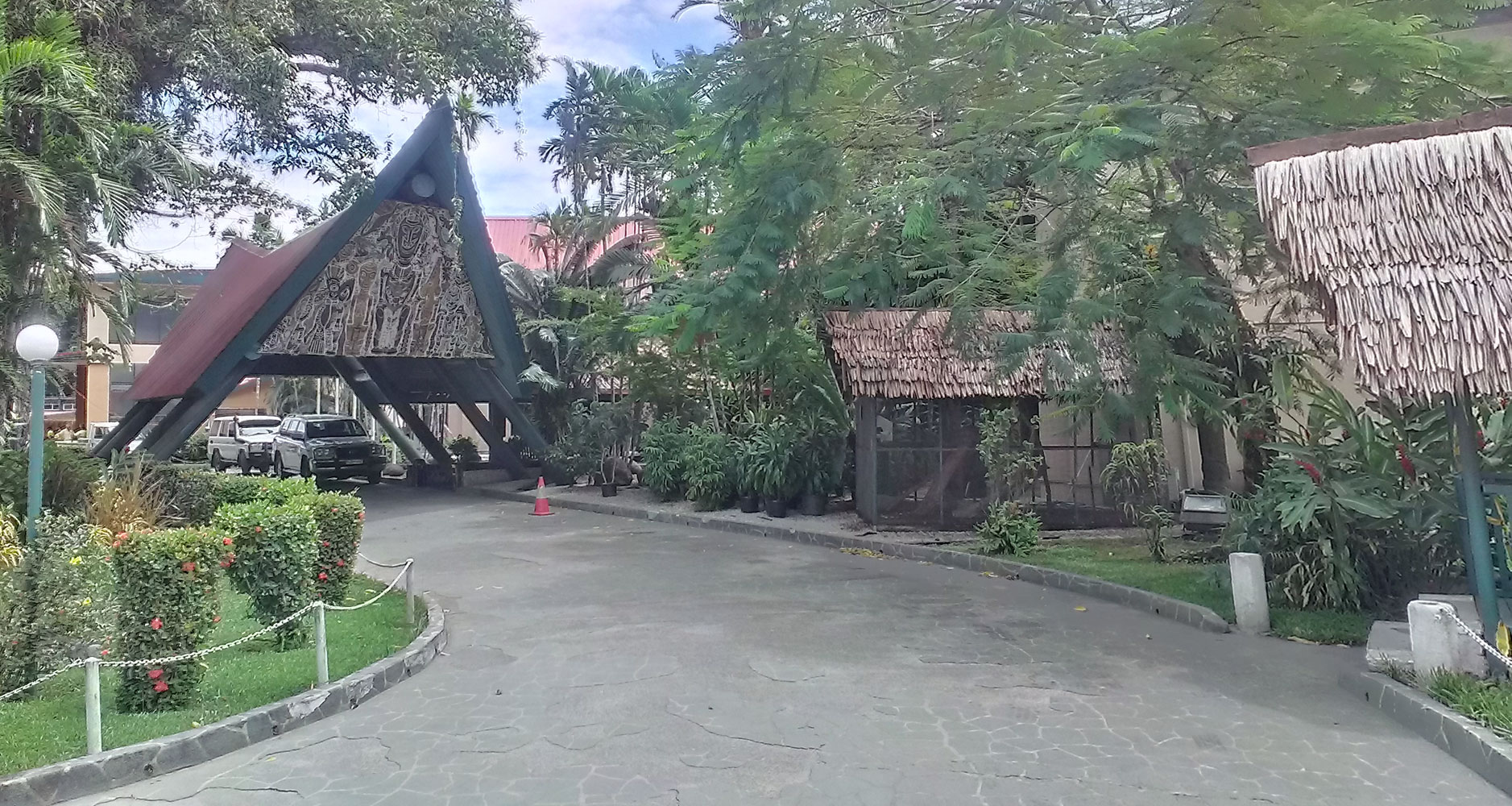
Photo of Lae International Hotel, 4th Street Lae

=== Lae War Cemetery ===
Lae War Cemetery was established in 1944, and is located adjacent to the Botanical Gardens in the centre of the city. The cemetery holds the remains of over 2,800 soldiers, many of whom died in the Salamaua–Lae campaign, but also those who died in Japanese detention on the Island. It is also the resting place of two Victoria Cross recipients.

=== Lae Botanic Gardens ===
Lae Botanic gardens are not always open to the public. There is an old Australian Aeroplane in the centre of the gardens.

=== Bumbu river ===
The Bumbu river starts at the Adzera Mountain range, through Taraka to Kamkumung, Hengali, Butibam, and to the Huon Gulf. Following a flood in 1992, the population was relocated to a temporary settlement called Tent Siti (City).

=== Angau General Hospital ===
Angau General Hospital is located in the central Lae area next to the old Lae Airfield. It is a main referral hospital for the general Morobe Province area, as well as the other provinces connected by road link. It contains the only Radiotherapy facility in the country and thus serves as the main referral centre for cancer patients.

=== Lae (Nadzab) Airport ===
Nadzab Airport is located 56 kilometres (35 mi) outside Lae City, along the Highlands Highway, next to the Markham River. Local buses operate to and from the city, in addition escorted secured transfers are available for transport into the city.

From Port Moresby, Lae is accessible only by domestic flights. Air Niugini, Airlines of Papua New Guinea (also known as "Airlines PNG") and Travel Air "Mangi lo Ples" services the Port Moresby-Lae route.

=== Other locations ===
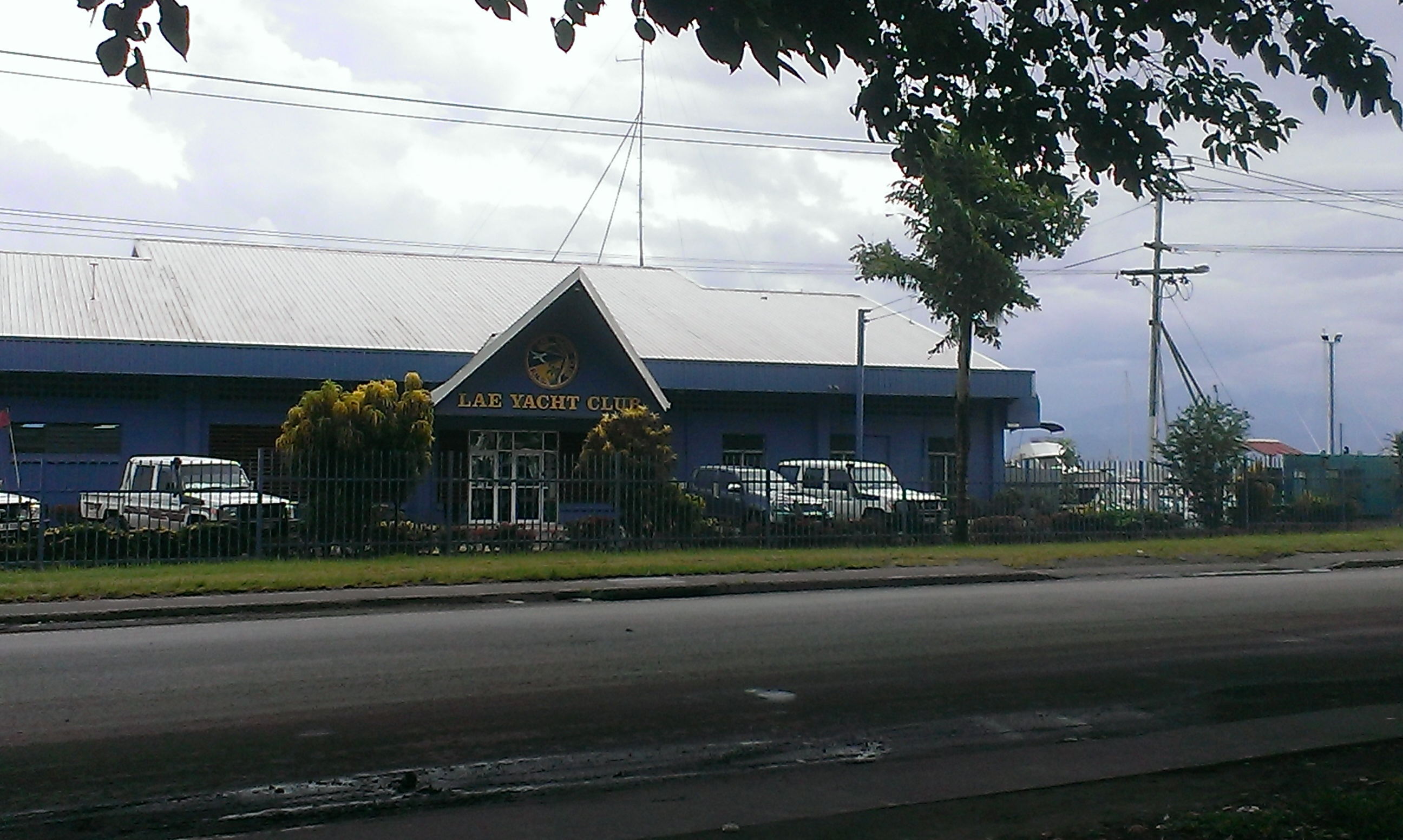
Lae Yacht Club

- Sir Ignatius Kilage Stadium
- Lae Golf Course
- National Polytechnic Institute of Papua New Guinea
- Lae Yacht Club
- Lae Showgrounds
- Papindo Shopping Centre at 7th Street

== Healthcare ==
Visitors must ensure that they have proper health insurance. Lae International Hospital is of good developing world standard. It is a 19-bed facility with 1 emergency bed. It is staffed by 6 doctors, one general practitioner, an anesthesiologist, a surgeon, a radiologist, and two obstetricians. Doctors come from a number of countries, while nurses are local nationals. There is also a public hospital called Angau Memorial Hospital located on Markham Road.

There was a significant outbreak of cholera based in the Morobe District in 2009 and consideration of vaccination would be prudent.

== Transportation ==
The city is served by Lae Nadzab Airport.

== Twin Towns ==
- Cairns, Queensland, Australia, since 1984
- (Timor-Leste) Dili, Timor Leste since 2000

== See also ==
- Invasion of Salamaua–Lae
