= Kilinailau Trench =

Ocean trench in south western Pacific Ocean

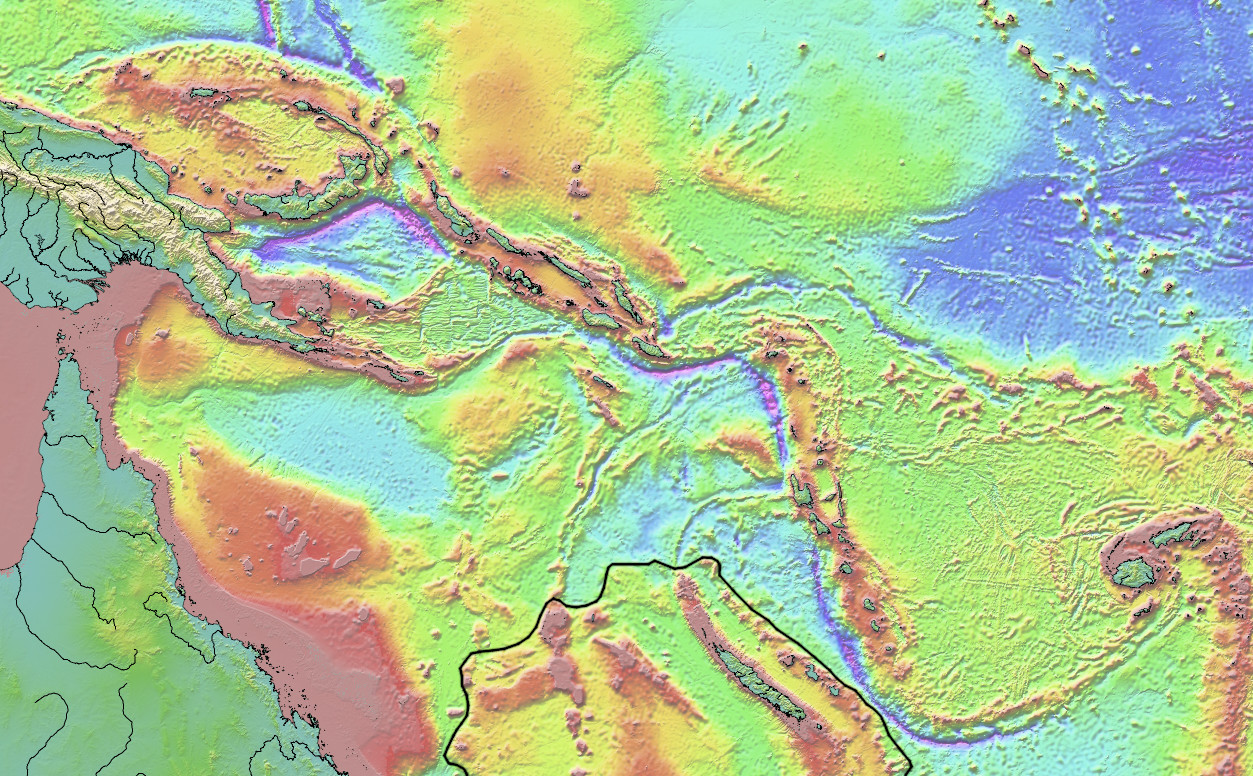
Seafloor topographic map of area of Kilinailau Trench. The labelled New Britain Trench to its south-west is the nearest now actively subducting ocean trench.
Approximate surface projection on Pacific Ocean of the relic (ie currently not actively subducting) Kilinailau Trench. While other related relic trenches (light blue) are shown for context, active trenches nearby, which are to the south are not. Click, then mouse-over shows feature names.

The Kilinailau Trench is an oceanic trench delineating the former oceanic crust boundary between the Pacific Plate and the now inactive North Bismarck Plate, in the area to the west of Papua New Guinea. To its south west is the inactive North Solomon Trench. The collision of the Ontong Java Plateau in the then subducting oceanic crust of the Pacific Plate, initially to the trench's south-east, changed the plate collision dynamics relative to the then Indo-Australian Plate to the west. Now the Ontong Java Plateau is just to the east of the trench and its great depth of crust appears to explain why subduction stalled here, and moved to the opposite direction along the far side of New Britain and the Solomons. The Melanesian ocean arc ridge structures formed when the trench was active are to its west and would include the north eastern part of New Ireland.

The West Melanesian Trench (Manus Trench), which looks as if it is a western continuation of the Kilinailai Trench, marks the boundary between the Caroline Plate and North Bismarck Plates. It is, however, disputed whether the Caroline Plate moves independently from the Pacific Plate. If not, the West Melanesian Trench and Kilinailau trenches form the Pacific-North Bismarck boundary together.

== See also ==
- Caroline Plate
- Ontong Java Plateau
- New Britain Subduction Zone
