= Woodlark Basin =

Oceanic basin located to the east of the island of New Guinea

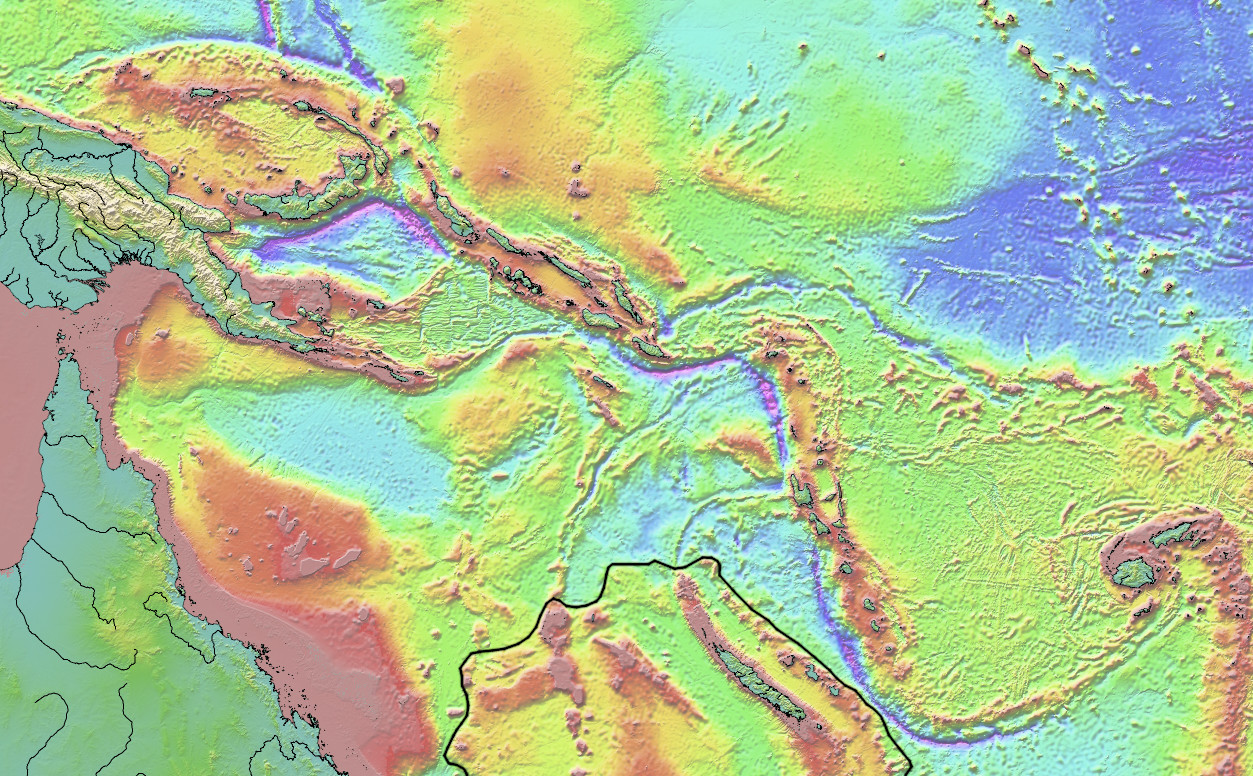
- Seafloor topographic map in area of Woodlark Basin.
- Type: Oceanic basin

Location
- Coordinates: 10°15′S 153°45′E
- Region: Southwestern Pacific Ocean
- Country: Papua New Guinea
- Approximate surface projection on Pacific Ocean of Woodlark Basin (light blue shading).

The Woodlark Basin is a young geologic structural basin located in the southwestern Pacific Ocean, found to the southeast of the island country of Papua New Guinea. The basin is an extensional basin that is actively spreading and has a seafloor spreading center. The basin formed between the then Indo-Australian plate and the Solomon microplate creating the presently independent Woodlark plate. The Woodlark Basin has a complex geologic history dating back twenty million years to the initial opening of the basin but most of the spreading has happened in the last 3.6 million years.

The subduction under the New Britain Trench to the north and the northern San Cristobal Trough to the east in the Woodlark Basin is unusual because the new crust is very young and light unlike most oceanic crust that gets subducted which is older and of higher density with higher sedimentary load.

== Geographical Context ==
The Woodlark Basin (Note: The basin was named in 1967 by Dale Krause) is located between the Louisiade Archipelago off the southeastern coast of New Guinea, with Woodlark Island to its north and the northern Solomon Islands.

== Geology ==
The historic Indo-Australian plate (Note: Currently the Indian and Australian plates are separate so the term Indo-Australian plate should be used in historical sense and Australian plate for the current tectonic plate) and the Pacific plate have had oblique convergence. This is when two tectonic plates come together and collide at an odd angle rather than head-on, as has been the case, from the time the basin was formed. An example of oblique convergence would be if a plate moving north collided with another plate moving east, which results in a transpressional regime. The overwhelming drag of the overriding Pacific plate caused the Solomon microplate to break away from the Indo-Australian plate, producing a mega shear zone between the two plates made up of at least two microplates. This shear zone has been named the Nubara Fault, Nubara faults or Nubara Transform Fault which is along the eastern part of the Woodlark Rise that separates at least two microplates, being the Solomon Sea plate and the Woodlark plate. This means that the Nubara fault region is the only one of the four sides of the Solomon plate that is not being subducted currently. The passive rifting and seafloor spreading in the Woodlark Basin has produced the Woodlark plate in the northern part of the basin, as a separate microplate from the present Australian plate. The western end of the Woodlark Basin is still rifting towards the edge of New Guinea. The Pocklington Rise and Plockington Trough separate the Woodlark Basin from the old subduction and spreading centers in the Australian plate from before 20 million years ago. (Note: This article is expansive to attempt to explain past mistaken interpretations of the local complex tectonics as many standard texts are out of date. The maps and explanations in the articles on the Woodlark plate and Trobriand plate may help.)

A distinctive feature of the Woodlark Basin that scientists and researchers explored is the transition from continental rifting to sea floor spreading. The rifting at the western end of the basin has split the Woodlark Rise from the Pocklington Rise. The Woodlark Basin is one of the few places on Earth where scientists can actively study this transition. It is one of few ocean basins that has been completely systematically mapped, resulting in tectonic model refinement over the last 50 years. As a result of such understanding here, and elsewhere, it was known by 2009 that initial spreading offset faulting from a spreading center is usually non-transform and that transform faults develop after seafloor spreading had begun. This issue took 40 years to resolve after the importance of transform faults to the theory of plate tectonics was first understood.

In the region of the basin, towards its west, there has been unusually rapid emplacement, at greater than 1–2 cm/year (0.39–0.79 in/year) vertically, of the youngest seven to five million year old rocks in metamorphic core complexes and gneissic domes.

There are active hydrothermal vents in the eastern basin along the line of the seafloor spreading. A particularly active region was discovered in 2019 and is called the La Scala Vent Field at over 3.3 km (2.1 mi) depth. Geological samples from the dark smoking chimneys showed the lack of the typical enrichment in gold or lead found in vents in back-arc settings (i.e. in contrast to the much older hydrothermal vents in the very western parts of the basin) and is consistent with basalt related hydrothermal fields along mid-oceanic ridges elsewhere.

=== Sediments ===
The Woodlark Basin is very young and only started spreading around 3 million years ago, so that there is very little sediment in the basin relative to most oceanic basins. These can have thousands of meters of sediment fill close to continental margins. The basin has a maximum thickness of 1500 meters of sediment fill in the deepest section of the North Moresby graben, however most of the basin is covered in less than 1000 meters of sediment. The eastern basin volcanics near its spreading center are only covered by a thin sediment dusting composed of nanofossil-bearing clay. This is great for researchers because different features, such as faults and spreading centers, can easily be seen in satellite images of the basin due to the lack of sediment buildup.

=== Volcanics ===
Basalts, basaltic andesite, andesite, and hydrothermal iron oxide has been recovered from the Franklin, Cheshire and Dobu Seamounts in the westernmost Woodlark area. From the Cheshire Seamount in the western Woodlark Basin samples had been intensely hydrothermally altered from precursor andesitic to rhyolitic composition with quartz growth, from over time magmatic processes, silicification, chloritization, formation of illite, sericitic alteration, replacement of plagioclase by albite, and sulfidation associated with concentration of precious metals and other minerals.

In the east at the spreading center, tholeiitic basalt similar to mid-ocean ridge basalt (MORB) in composition is found with observation of cold pillow lava deposits. Where the Woodlark Basin is subducted northeast beneath the New Georgia Islands in the deformation associated with the northern San Cristobal Trough, the relative light plate made of recent oceanic type basalt stays shallow. It is presumably being melted on mantle contact and producing the many arc volcanoes of the western Solomon Islands. An exception may be the Savo Island volcano which is postulated to be related to a 200 km (120 mi) deep old Pacific plate slab with its associated deep earthquakes that underlies the southern portions of New Georgia Sound.

=== Tectonics ===
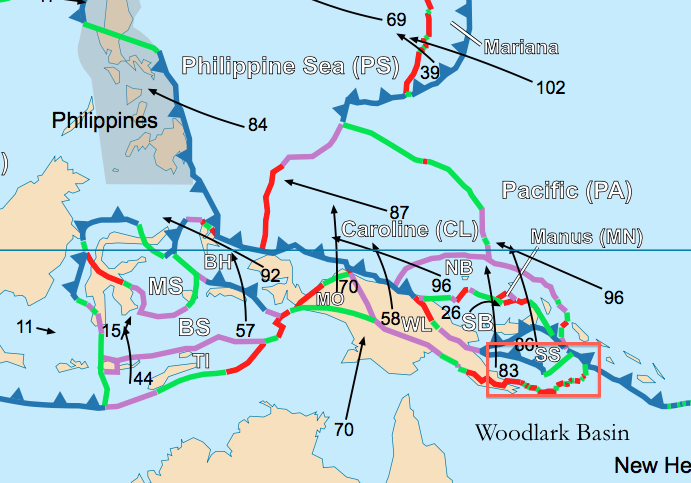
Figure 2: Map of previous understanding of the complex plate tectonics in the region surrounding the Woodlark Basin, which is within the red rectangle. Please see text of article for updated understanding of the tectonics.

Approximate surface projection on Pacific Ocean of some major tectonic features near or in the Woodlark Basin (light blue shading). Active trenches are blue lines (e.g. New Britain Trench in centre) and presumed inactive trenches are light blue lines. Postulated active tectonic divergent boundaries/spreading features are shown in yellow. Ridges and postulated active tectonic transform boundaries are not shown to reduce map complexity. See Woodlark plate, Solomon Sea plate and Trobriand plate articles for plate boundaries. Click, then mouse-over shows feature names.

The local tectonics are driven by the oblique convergence of the present Pacific and Australian plates at about 11 cm/year (4.3 in/year) near eastern Papua New Guinea. This produces one of the Euler poles for the region near the west coast of New Guinea between Port Moresby and Hood Point to its south. The most recent change in spreading direction of the Woodlark Basin spreading center occurred about 450,000 years ago with a slowing in rate of divergence about 200,000 years ago.

The Woodlark Basin originally began to open as a sphenochasm with a pole near the tip of eastern Papua about 20 million years ago. This was caused by left-lateral shear in the region induced by a change in the relative motion pole of the Indo-Australian plate and Pacific plate. The basin opened only a few degrees at this time, then stopped for a good period of time. The thickly sedimented troughs south of the Woodlark Basin (e.g. Pocklington Trough and Rennell Trough) are remnants of Paleogene northward subduction of the historic Indo-Australian plate. The distal to the north-east North Solomon Trough, beyond the Solomon Islands from the Woodlark Basin, had southward subduction of the Pacific plate that finished 10 million years ago.

The rifting resumed in the entire basin about 3 million years ago, based on magnetic anomaly data. Then about 1 million years ago, the spreading center in the western basin shifted to the Woodlark Rise. The Woodlark Rise is the northern section of the Woodlark Basin that separates the basin from the bordering Solomon Sea to the north. This spreading rift marks the southern boundary of the Solomon Plate, which is bounded by subduction zones in the north and east (the New Britain and northern Solomon's trenches (e.g. North Solomon Trough) respectively), and in the west by a combination strike-slip rifting (dip-slip) boundary in eastern Papua (New Guinea). A vector triangle solution near the Solomons Trench-Woodlark Rift triple point gives underthrusting of the Solomons Plate beneath the North Solomon Trough in a northeasterly direction at about 11 centimeters per year. However the implications change slightly with later modelling.

A recent best fit model suggests there is some continuing subduction at the Trobriand Trough which is at the southern aspect of the Solomon Plate. This model seems to account for the relative lack of shallow earthquake activity except in the middle region of the Trobriand Trough. Historically an extra Trobriand plate moving independently of the Australian and Solomon plates must have existed, and it will still exist if there is present active subduction between it and the Solomon Plate.

The Solomon microplate is moving slightly to the north-west at the moment, at 4.5 cm/year (1.8 in/year), so the Woodlark microplate tectonics carry much of this north-east movement if the reference point is a fixed Australian plate. Relative to the Woodlark microplate, Figure 2 shows each of the tectonic plates surrounding the Woodlark Basin along with the relative plate motion and direction that each plate is moving on a historic three plate model for the region, which apart from the movement vectors is no longer generally accepted. However refinements were being made up to less than a decade ago. Even so, the Nubara Transform Fault to the north of the basin is accommodating 0.93–0.95 cm/year (0.37–0.37 in/year) of movement, and the Australian plate is moving from the south between 2.09 cm/year (0.82 in/year) at the west and 4.02 cm/year (1.58 in/year) at the eastern side of the basin.

Matters change for the size of the Solomon Plate, with the creation of a postulated still active Trobriand plate in a 4 plate, 7 triple junction, solution to the local complex tectonics. The northwestern part of the Trobriand plate in such a model, is moving to the south east towards Australia by 1.21 cm/year (0.48 in/year). The New Guinea Highlands host the plate junction with the Australian plate that in a current three plate model was assigned to the Solomon Plate. In the highlands due to the location of the systems eular pole there is a transition so that by the eastern end of the Papuan Peninsular the Australian plate is moving north towards the Trobriand plate by 1.57 cm/year (0.62 in/year). The western Woodlark plate triple junction with the Trobriand plate and Australian plate has the Woodlark plate moving in an easterly direction at about 0.95 cm/year (0.37 in/year) and the Trobriand Trough is absorbing about 0.45 cm/year (0.18 in/year) of subduction.

Definite subduction is current at the New Britain Trench, where Solomon Sea seafloor crust subducts to the north under New Britain and Bougainville in the new Britain subduction zone. The Australia Plate subducts to the east and north beneath Guadalcanal and San Cristobal at the San Cristobal Trench. In both cases this results in normal faulting on the subducting plate, shallow thrust faulting beneath the forearc, and steeply dipping Wadati–Benioff zones extending to 200 km (120 mi) depth, with at the surface, active arc volcanoes. In between the Woodlark Basin is subducted northeast beneath the New Georgia Islands but here the deformation front lacks a flexed outer rise and bathymetric trench.

==== Low angle normal faulting ====
The Woodlark Basin is one of very few places on the earth to have active low angle normal faults. A low angle normal fault is a normal fault that has a dip of less than thirty degrees (dip < 30°). This is a topic that is currently debated heavily, the low angle normal fault paradox. Low angle normal faults have been proposed to be a key structural feature for crustal extension. In the Woodlark Basin the active low angle normal faults have a dips between 15°-35°, and are all located in the small range of 150.5° E to 152.5° E. This is the area in the Woodlark Basin where seafloor spreading makes the transition to continental rifting. However, some scientists do not believe that low angle normal faults exist actively in the world. They instead believe that the low angle normal faults to date characterised are old normal faults that are no longer active and have been rotated to a different orientation. This would make a normal fault look like it was a low angle normal fault that is no longer active.

==== Sea-floor spreading ====
The Woodlark Basin is actively spreading in a mostly north and south direction across its center, in an east–west orientation in a process that started about 3.6 million years ago. A large amount of sea floor has been formed as defined by magnetic studies. The spreading centers are offset by transform faults, creating five segments, this causes the spreading center to be uneven across the basin. There are two larger transform faults called respectively the Moresby transform in the middle of the basin and the Simbo transform at the far eastern end of the spreading center. The rate of spreading in the eastern section of the basin at 6.7 cm/year (2.6 in/year) is significantly higher than the rate of spreading of 3.8 cm/year (1.5 in/year) on the western side of the basin. Satellite imaging helped the visual identification that the spreading rates across the basin are uneven, before full global positioning studies. As the eastern side of the basin has opened up much faster than the western side, with the separation at the Moresby Transform Fault, there is a shallower seafloor to the West, and an axial graben to the East, that is about 500 m (1,600 ft) deeper than the western basin. This is only easily visible in satellite imaging due to the relatively small amount of sediment build up in the basin.

Historically seafloor spreading to the west of the Moresby transform did not commence until 4 to 2 million years ago, after the arc volcanism that accompanied uplift of both the D'Entrecasteaux Islands gneissic domes and Suckling-Dayman massif of the Pupuan Peninsula of New Guinea. It is also known that prior to 4 million years ago seafloor spreading in the Woodlark Basin was up to 240 km (150 mi) east of the Simbo Transform where it ends today.

== Natural resources ==
The basin is not currently being explored by any large companies seeking to find natural resources. Due to the extremely young age of the Woodlark basin (less than 5 million years old), the basin has not had enough time for significant amounts of natural resources, such as oil and gas, to form.

== Hot vent ecology ==
Because the eastern Woodlark Basin is older than the currently active spreading centres of the adjacent Lau and North Fiji basins, it may act as a biodiversity dispersion centre for modern hydrothermal vent fauna. Alviniconcha spp. a type of hot vent associated marine snail (gastropod) ecologically diversified 20 million years ago and has been found at Woodlark Basin hydrothermal vents. The bacteria at the bottom of the food chain are sulfide oxidizers but unlike some other vent communities there is evidence that they use both the Calvin–Benson–Bassham (CBB) cycle and the Reverse Krebs cycle alternatives. A particularly rich fauna has been characterised and other species found include:

- Alvinocarididae shrimp:
  - Rimicaris shrimp, e.g. Rimicaris variabilis
  - Alvinocaris spp.
- Barnacles (Cirriped):
  - A new species of stalked barnacles, Vulcanolepas sp. nov
  - Eochinelasmus ohtai
  - Neoverrucidae as Imbricaverruca sp.
- Other gastropods:
  - Ifremeria nautilei
  - Shinkailepas tufari
  - Phymorhynchus sp.
- Marine Polychaete worms:
  - Branchinotogluma segonzaci
- Marine alvinellid worms:
  - Paralvinella sp.
- Bamboo corals (Isididae)
- Squat lobsters (Munidopsidae)
- Brisingid starfish
- Crinoids
- Sea anemones (Actiniaria)
- Blind Austinograea crabs

== See also ==
- Kavachi
