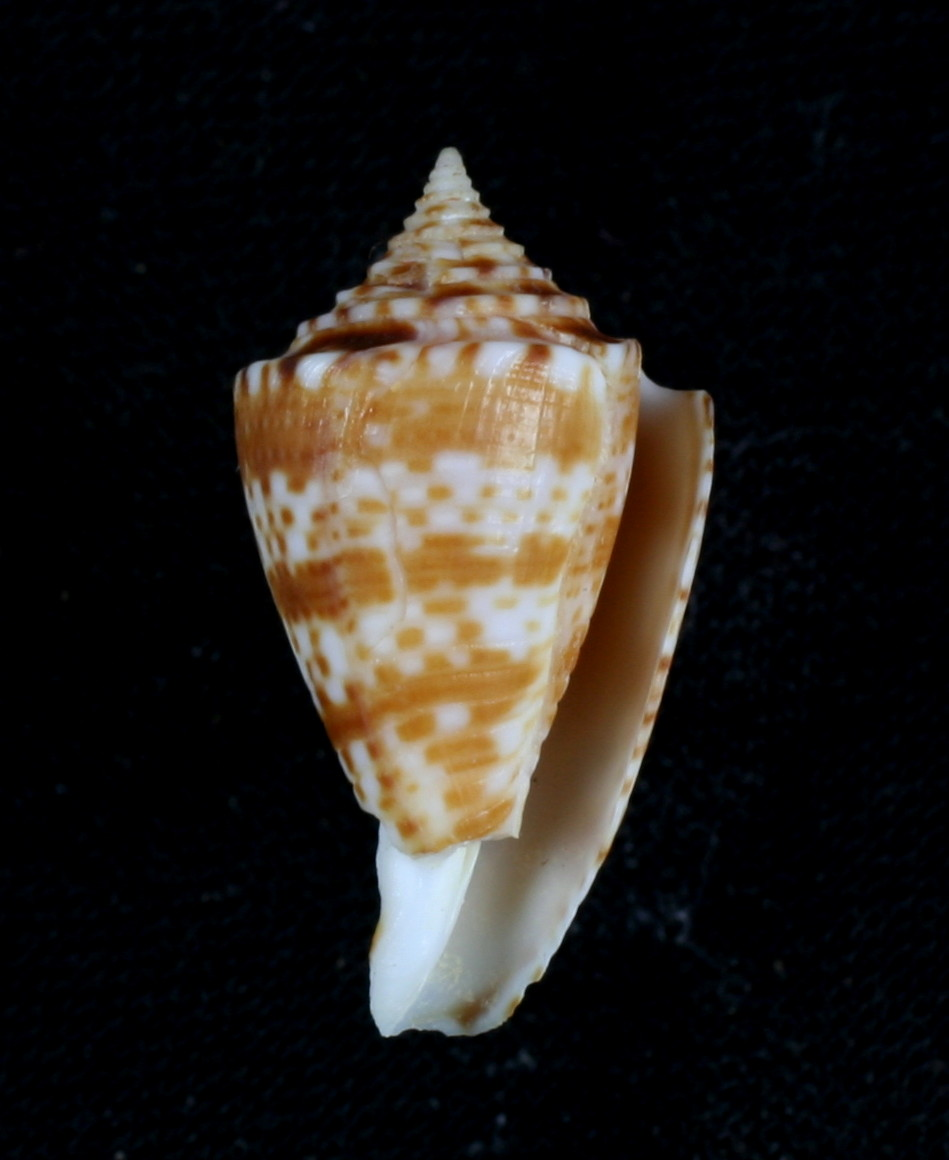
- Apertural view of shell of ''Conasprella wakayamaensis Petuch, 1979, trawled at 150 meters off Aliguay Island in the Philippines

Conservation status
- Least Concern (IUCN 3.1)

Scientific classification
- Kingdom: Animalia
- Phylum: Mollusca
- Class: Gastropoda
- Subclass: Caenogastropoda
- Order: Neogastropoda
- Superfamily: Conoidea
- Family: Conidae
- Genus: Conasprella
- Species: C. wakayamaensis

Binomial name
- Conasprella wakayamaensis (Kuroda, 1956)

Synonyms
- Asprella wakayamaensis Kuroda, 1956 (original combination); Conasprella (Conasprella) wakayamaensis (Kuroda, 1956) · accepted, alternate representation; Conus nereis Petuch, 1979; Conus wakayamaensis (Kuroda, 1956)

= Conasprella wakayamaensis =

Species of gastropod

Conasprella wakayamaensis is a species of sea snail, a marine gastropod mollusk in the family Conidae, the cone snails and their allies.

Like all species within the genus Conasprella, these snails are predatory and venomous. They are capable of stinging humans. Therefore, live ones should be handled carefully or not at all.

== Description ==
The size of the shell varies between 24 mm and 33 mm.

== Distribution ==
This marine species occurs off Taiwan and Japan; also in the Bismarck Sea off Papua New Guinea.

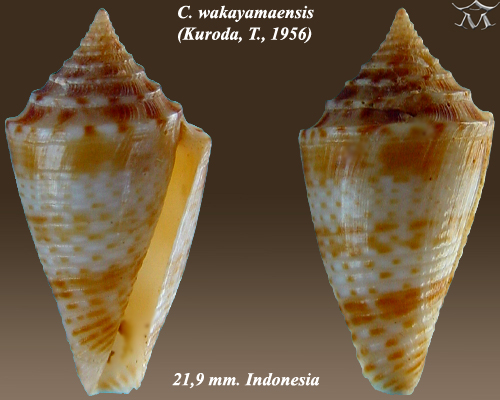
Conasprella wakayamaensis (Kuroda, T., 1956)

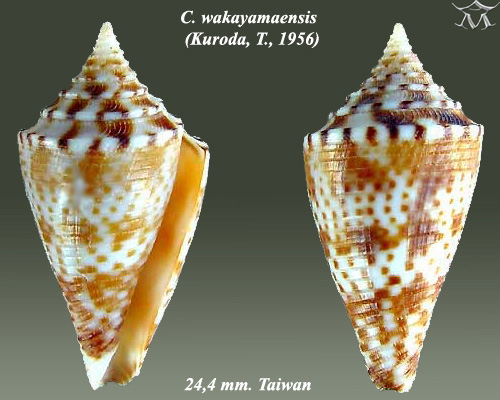
Conasprella wakayamaensis (Kuroda, T., 1956)
