= West Caroline Basin =

Oceanic basin in the southwestern Pacific Ocean

The West Caroline Basin is an oceanic basin in the south-west Pacific Ocean north of New Guinea.

== Bathymetry and oceanography ==
The West Caroline Basin is bordered by the islands and banks of Melanesia to the north and west, including the Caroline and Palau islands, and to the east the Eauripik Rise separates it from the East Caroline Basin. Its depth lies between 4,000–5,000 m (13,000–16,000 ft). The Eauripik Rise reaches a depth of 2,000–3,000 m (6,600–9,800 ft) and allows Pacific deep (2000 m and deeper) and intermediate (1000-2000 m) waters to enter the basin.

The West Caroline Basin is separated from the West Mariana Basin by the Caroline Seamounts. These two basins are connected by the Mariana and Yap trenches separated by a sill c. 5,000 m (16,000 ft) deep. Water above this depth can reach the West Caroline Basin without perturbations and temperature and salinity profiles for the two basins are similar. This trench, the only conduit for bottom waters in the West Caroline Basin, ventilates the basin.

The North Equatorial Current flows westward across the West Caroline Basin between 25°N and 5°N around 170-180°E in February but lies below 10°N in August. As it reaches the Philippine continental shelf it splits into two currents, the southern branch of which joins the east-bound Equatorial Counter Current.

== Tectonic evolution ==
The West and East Caroline basins have similar but distinct histories. Sea-floor spreading started c. 36 Ma along mostly East–North-East-directed axes, except in the eastern West Caroline Basin where anomalies are oriented more East-West. Spreading continued at a relatively constant spreading half-rate of 6.5–6.0 cm/year (2.6–2.4 in/year) until c. 31 Ma when spreading either ceased or slowed considerably in the western parts of both basins but continued in the eastern parts. This regime ended c. 27 Ma in the eastern West Caroline Basin and c. 28 Ma in the eastern East Caroline Basin. In the West Caroline Basin a period of intermediate spreading rates which continued until 14.5 Ma is still visible as a sharp north-south decline in sediment thickness in the southern parts of the basin. The final stage of sea-floor spreading spanned at least the period 12.5–14.5 Ma.

== See also ==
- Caroline Plate
