= New Britain Trench =

Oceanic trench in the southern Pacific Ocean

Coordinates: 6°00′S 152°30′E

Approximate surface projection on Pacific Ocean of New Britain Trench (blue).
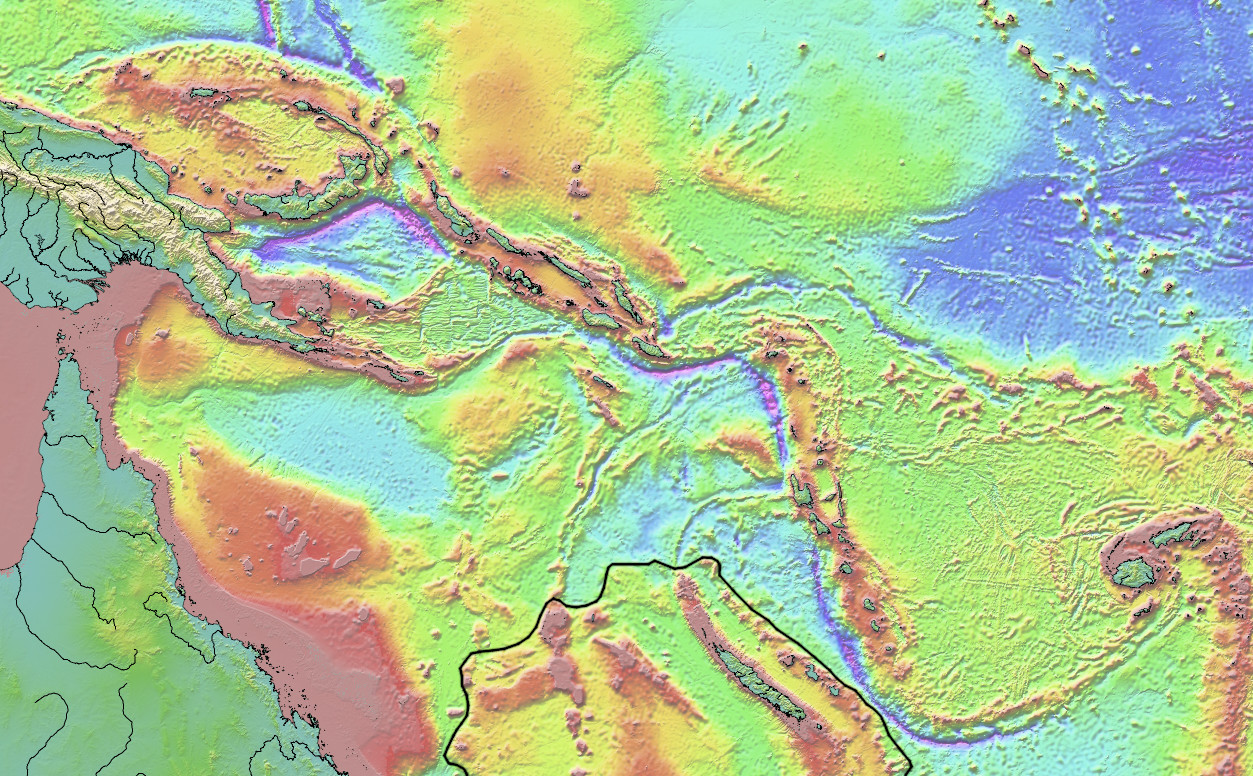
Seafloor topographic map of area adjacent to New Britain Trench.

The New Britain Trench (also known as Bougainville-New Britain Trench or New Britain-Solomon Trench) has formed due to subduction of the floor of the Solomon Sea and has some of the highest current seismic activity in the world.

The trench was discovered by the German research vessel SMS Planet, in 1910.

== Geography ==
The trench is 840 km (520 mi) long, curved around the south of New Britain and west of Bougainville Island in the northern Solomon Sea. The deepest point is the Planet Deep at 9,140 m (29,990 ft).

=== Tectonics ===
The New Britain subduction zone is a continuum with the Vanuatu subduction zone and are all cases of subduction polarity reversal as originally the Pacific Plate subducted under the Indo-Australian Plate's minor plates such as the North Bismarck Plate. However now minor plate subduction is associated with the Australian Plate subducting under the Pacific Plate. In this case it is the Solomon Sea Plate and Trobriand Plate subducting under the South Bismarck Plate. It is possible that the collision to the west of the 30–35 km (19–22 mi) thick Ontong Java Plateau with the Vitiaz Trench from about 25 million years ago initiated this polarity reversal. The rates of subduction and roll back are high and are currently for the New Britain Trench, a subduction velocity of 65–120 mm (2.6–4.7 in)/year, a convergence velocity of 2–48 mm (0.079–1.890 in)/year, and spreading deformation rate in its arc-back- arc area of 10–74 mm (0.39–2.91 in)/year. In various parts of the trench there is up to 180 mm (7.1 in)/year of trench roll back and 20 mm (0.79 in)/year of trench advance.

=== Associated seismicity ===
The New Britain subduction zone is extremely seismically active and has had more than 22 earthquakes with magnitudes equal to or larger than 7.5 since 1990.

=== Associated volcanism ===
There is quite active arc volcanism with for example the active Rabaul Caldera area in the north east of New Britain having had a recent series of eruptions in 1994 that destroyed the port of Rabaul.

== Ecology ==
The diversity of life forms discovered living on top of the trench floor sediments and scavenging communities is high, with during one study at 1 km (0.62 mi) depth 35 species observed, with biodiversity decreasing at 3.7 km (2.3 mi) depth before increasing again at 8.2 km (5.1 mi). This is likely to reflect several factors. The trench is situated within the southern West Pacific Warm Pool characterized by sea surface temperature greater than 28°C and because of its closeness to tropical land, the land is subject to high rain fall. The trench is only 55 km (34 mi) offshore from New Britain with an almost uniform slope into it of about 8°. Hence there is a very high organic carbon load, sourced more than other trenches from soil organic matter, although marine phytoplankton and a minor contribution from land plants also help.

Species observed at 1 km (0.62 mi) depth included a free swimming Teuthidodrilus (squidworm). and ulmarid jellyfish.

At 8.7 km (5.4 mi) depth starfish and shrimps believed to be either of the family Penaeidae or the order Mysida were observed. There were 5 amphipod species including Alicella gigantea. Novel viruses and bacteria have been characterised in the sediment collected at this depth.
