= Ulawun =

Stratovolcano in Papua New Guinea

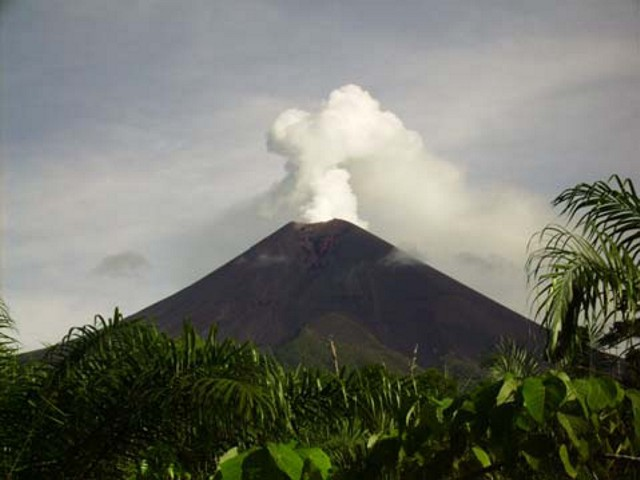
- Ulawun issuing passive steaming

Highest point
- Elevation: 2,334 m (7,657 ft)
- Prominence: 2,334 m (7,657 ft)
- Listing: Ultra; Ribu
- Coordinates: 5°03′00″S 151°20′00″E

Geography
- Location within Papua New Guinea
- Location: West New Britain Province, Papua New Guinea

Geology
- Formed by: Subduction zone volcanism
- Mountain type: Stratovolcano
- Volcanic arc: Bismarck volcanic arc
- Last eruption: April 21, 2025

Ulawun is an active stratovolcano in West New Britain Province, on the island of New Britain in Papua New Guinea.

About 130 km (81 mi) southwest of the township of Rabaul, Ulawun is the highest mountain in New Britain and the second in the Bismarck Archipelago at 2,334 metres (7,657 ft), and one of the most active volcanoes in Papua New Guinea. A total of 22 recorded eruptions have occurred since the 18th century; the first, in 1700, was recorded by William Dampier. Several thousand people live near the volcano. Because of its eruptive history and proximity to populated areas, Ulawun is considered one of the Decade Volcanoes.

== Recent activity ==
The last few years have seen almost constant activity at Ulawun, with frequent small explosions, and have caused great damage and loss of life.

The volcano erupted at approximately 7am on 26 June 2019, and was quickly upgraded to a major sub-Plinian eruption, with ash climbing to 19 kilometres (62,000 ft). Over 5000 people were evacuated, and flights into nearby Hoskins Airport were cancelled. Lava cut the New Britain Highway in three different locations.

On 20 November 2023 ash emissions and eruption noises lead to the alert level being raised to stage 3. The eruption intesified the next hours and produced a plume that reached at an altiude of 15 kilometres (49,000 ft) that drifted 520 kilometres (320 mi) west, and alert level was raised to 4, the top of the scale. Pyroclastic flows descended the northwest and south flank and ashfall was recorded in the north and northwest of the volcano. The alert level was lowered to three the next day, ash emission was less intense, and then lowered again on 22 November.

Volcanoes in Papua New Guinea are some of the world's most prolific sources of sulphur dioxide. Recent studies have shown that Ulawun alone releases about 7 kg/s of SO_{2}, which is about 2% of the global total of SO_{2} emissions into the atmosphere. Its activity is related to subduction of the Solomon Sea Plate under the South Bismarck Plate in the New Britain subduction zone.

Ulawun has been named one of the Decade Volcanoes, 16 volcanoes identified as being worthy of particular study in light of their history of large, destructive eruptions and their proximity to populated areas.

== View ==
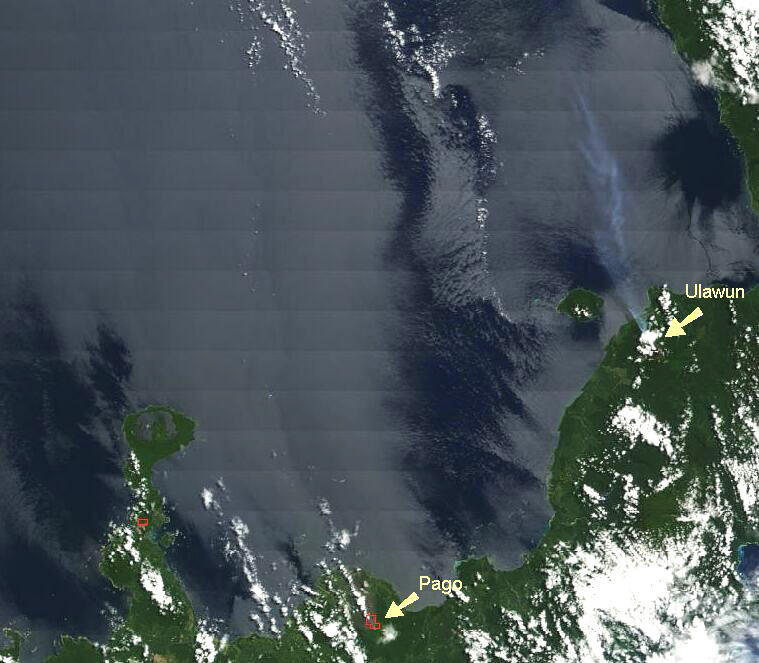
A steam plume from Ulawun drifting over the sea is clearly visible in this satellite image

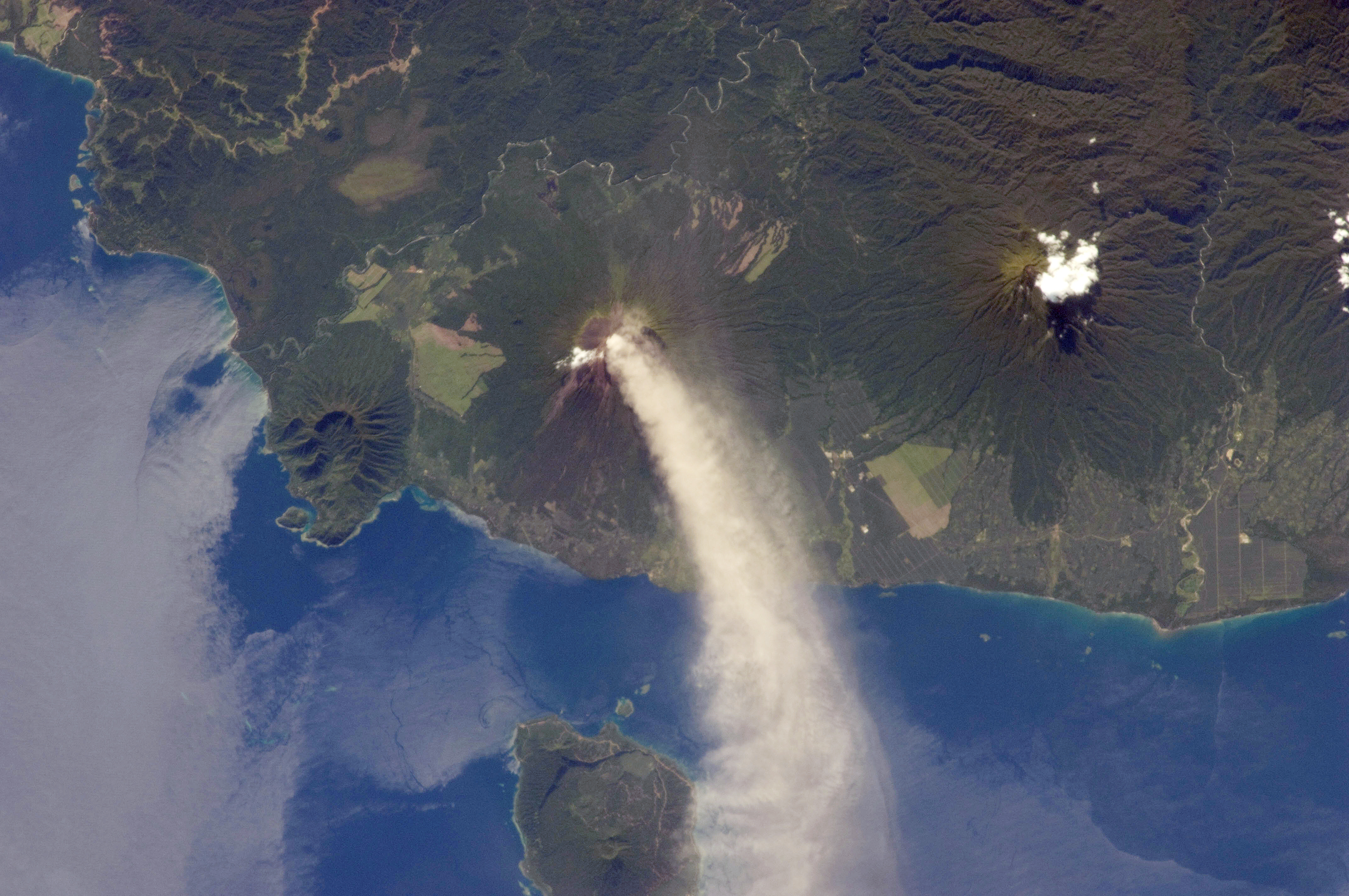
Ulawun Volcano and Lolobau Island

== See also ==
- List of volcanoes in Papua New Guinea
- List of ultras of Oceania
