= West Melanesian Trench =

Oceanic trench in the Bismarck Sea north of Papua New Guinea

Coordinates: 0°14′02″S 146°54′29″E

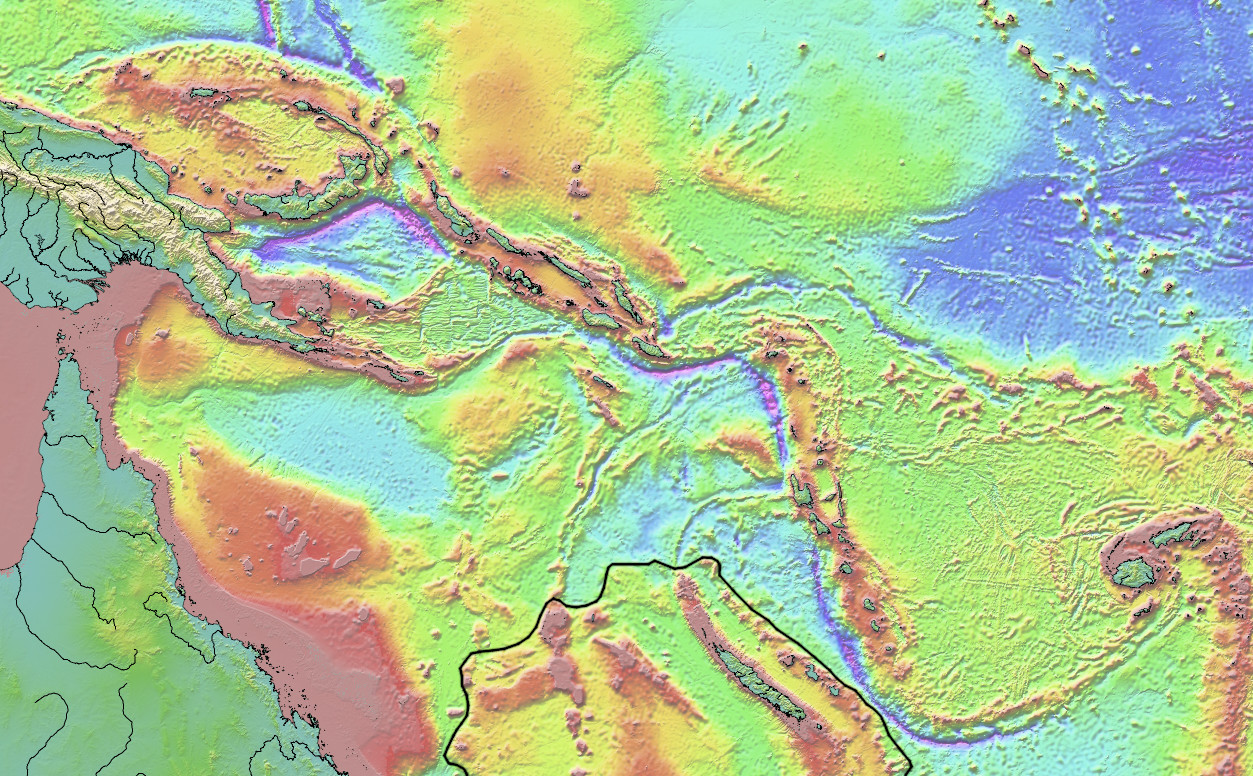
Seafloor topographic map of area of West Melanesian Trench. The labelled New Guinea and New Britain trenches are the nearest now definitely actively subducting ocean trenches.
Approximate surface projection on Pacific Ocean of the relic (ie currently not actively subducting) West Melanesian Trench. While other related relic trenches (light blue) are shown for context, active trenches nearby, which are to the south are not. Click, then mouse-over shows feature names.

The West Melanesian Trench (previously known as Manus Trench) is an oceanic trench in the Bismarck Sea north of Papua New Guinea delineating the plate tectonic boundary between the Caroline and North Bismarck plates.

There is only slight seismic activity along both the trench, and its status as an active subduction zone, as proposed in the 2003 general model of major plate movement, is not generally accepted now. A relative motion of 1 cm/year (0.39 in/year) or less has, nevertheless, been suggested for the trench, roughly normal to the trench.

The Kilinailau Trench east of New Ireland appears to form a continuation to the south west and is thought to mark the boundary between the Pacific and North Bismarck plates. It is, however, disputed whether the Caroline Plate moves independently from the Pacific Plate. If not, the West Melanesian and Kilinailau trenches form the Pacific-North Bismarck boundary together. The area to the western end of the trench is actively subducting under the Australian Plate at the New Guinea Trench.

Perpendicular to the two trenches is another trench, the Mussau Trough separating the Caroline Plate and Pacific Plate. This areas tectonics is still poorly understood.

== See also ==
- Caroline Plate
- Ontong Java Plateau
- New Britain Subduction Zone
