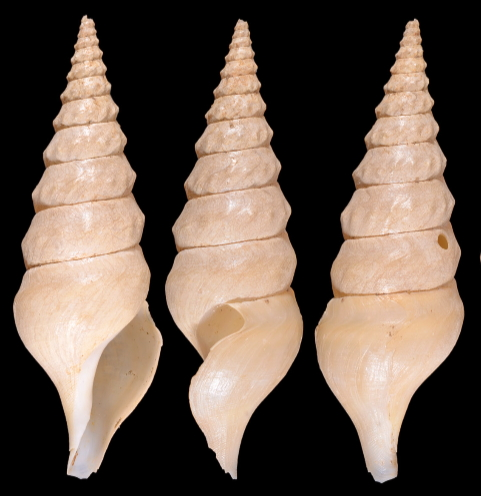
- Shell of Leucosyrinx boiteuxi(holotype)

Scientific classification
- Kingdom: Animalia
- Phylum: Mollusca
- Class: Gastropoda
- Subclass: Caenogastropoda
- Order: Neogastropoda
- Superfamily: Conoidea
- Family: Pseudomelatomidae
- Genus: Leucosyrinx
- Species: L. boiteuxi

Binomial name
- Leucosyrinx boiteuxi Kantor, Fedosov & Puillandre, 2025

= Leucosyrinx boiteuxi =

Species of gastropod

Leucosyrinx boiteuxi is a species of sea snail, a marine gastropod mollusk in the family Pseudomelatomidae, the turrids and allies.

== Description ==
The length of the shell of the holotype attains 57.4 mm, its diameter 17.4 mm.

(Original description) The large shell is fusiform, with a high spire. It is greyish in color, thin but solid. The protoconch and uppermost teleoconch whorls are missing. The remaining teleoconch comprises 11.5 whorls. The upper whorls are distinctly and roundly angulated at the shoulder, whereas the body whorl and the lower half of the penultimate whorl have a more rounded shoulder accentuated by a low keel. The subsutural ramp is concave on the upper whorls and nearly flat on the penultimate and last whorls. The suture is deep and impressed.

The upper teleoconch whorls bear strong, oblique, broad, rounded axial folds on the shoulder. These folds fade on the penultimate whorl and are absent from the body whorl. They weaken across the subsutural ramp and become markedly less pronounced toward the lower suture. Their number increases from 10 on the first preserved teleoconch whorl to 19 on the antepenultimate whorl.

The spiral sculpture is weak and consists of low, rounded, narrow, undulating spiral cords covering the entire shell. The cords are weaker on the subsutural ramp than below the shoulder. On the shell base and siphonal canal, the intervals between the cords are equal to or slightly greater than the width of the cords. Numerous thin growth lines are present and are particularly conspicuous on the subsutural ramp.

The shell base is convex and passes smoothly into a long, straight siphonal canal. The aperture is narrow, elongate-oval, and poorly differentiated from the canal. The inner lip is nearly straight, being only slightly concave. The columellar and parietal sides are covered by a narrow, distinct callus that is slightly lighter in color than the remainder of the last whorl. The anal sinus is deep, subsutural, and broadly arcuate, extending across the subsutural ramp and becoming confluent with the broad forward projection of the outer lip.

The radula bears duplex marginal teeth approximately 330 μm in length (2.5% of aperture length excluding the siphonal canal). The major limb is lanceolate in dorsal view and distinctly curved. The accessory limb is relatively broad, its width at the tooth base equaling the total width of the tooth. It is approximately three-quarters of the total tooth length and is inserted into a distinct, deep socket on the dorsal side of the major limb.

== Distribution ==
This marine species occurs in the Bismarck Sea, the Solomon Sea and Papua New Guinea at depths between 470 m and 706 m.
