= Manus plate =

Tiny tectonic plate northeast of New Guinea

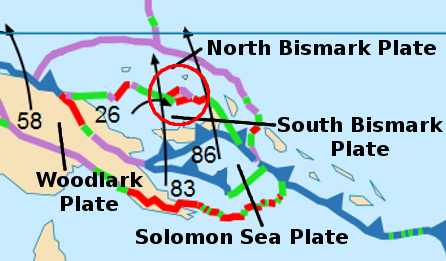
- Type: Minor
- Movement^{1}: north-west
- Speed^{1}: 92mm/year
- Features: Pacific Ocean
- ^{1}Relative to the African plate

The Manus plate is a 100-km-wide tectonic microplate located northeast of New Guinea. The Manus plate was formed in between the North Bismark Plate and the South Bismark Plate. The Manus plate currently rotates counter-clockwise in the Melanesia area.

== Formation ==
The Manus plate formed during the Brunhes-Matuyama reversal, making its maximum age approximately 781,000 years old. The Manus plate formed in-between and on top of the transform boundaries that were separating the North and South Bismark plates. The plate was formed of young mid-ocean ridge basalt, along with pieces of older oceanic floor that had broken off of the South Bismarck plate.

== Boundaries and movement ==
The north and northeast boundaries of the Manus plate, with the North Bismark and Pacific plates are both convergent boundaries. The plates southeast borders of the South Bismark plate is a divergent boundary. The southwest boundary bordering the South Bismark plate is a transform boundary. The Manus plate currently has a rate of rotation of 51°/ Ma at the spot, -3.04°N, 150.46°E, in the counter-clockwise direction, due to the plates left lateral motion. This is likely the fastest plate rotation on Earth at this time.
