= Trobriand plate =

Small tectonic plate located to the east of the island of New Guinea

- Approximate surface projections of active tectonic plates. Key: '"`UNIQ--templatestyles-00000000-QINU`"' Trobriand plate, '"`UNIQ--templatestyles-00000001-QINU`"' South Bismarck plate, '"`UNIQ--templatestyles-00000002-QINU`"' Solomon Sea plate, '"`UNIQ--templatestyles-00000003-QINU`"' Woodlark plate, '"`UNIQ--templatestyles-00000004-QINU`"' Active trench subduction boundaries, '"`UNIQ--templatestyles-00000005-QINU`"' Inactive trench subduction boundaries, '"`UNIQ--templatestyles-00000006-QINU`"' current spreading boundary. The Australian plate to the south-east and the Pacific plate to the north-west are not shown, but their complex collision has created these microplates. Click and then mouse over shows feature names.
- Type: Microplates
- Movement^{1}: north-west (rotational)
- Speed^{1}: 10 mm/year
- Features: New Guinea, Pacific Ocean
- ^{1}Relative to the African plate

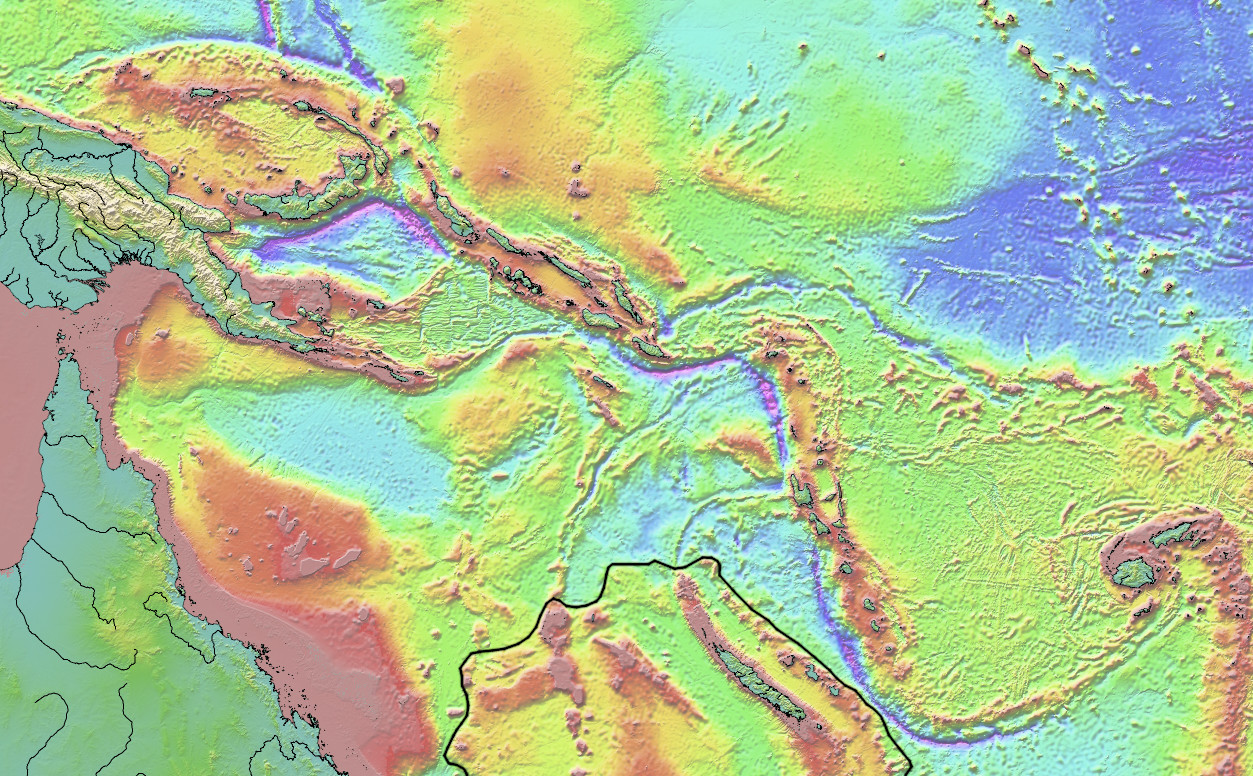
Seafloor topographic map of area of Trobriand plate. The location of the Solomon Sea plate (S. P.) and Woodlark plate (W. P.) are also labelled.

The Trobriand plate was, and likely is, an independent microplate between New Guinea and the Solomon Islands. It has some unique geology, having the presence of the youngest metamorphic core complexes on earth. If there is presently active subduction between it and the Solomon Sea plate, at the Trobriand Trough, it continues to be an active microplate. Otherwise in the latest tectonic models it has merged with the Solomon Sea plate, which becomes somewhat larger than predicted by Bird's 2003 model of tectonic plates. As a smaller Solomon Sea plate is totally underwater, global positioning data can not resolve this issue. The area of the plate is associated with earthquake and volcanic activity as part of the Pacific Ring of Fire.

== Geography ==
The Trobriand plate underlies south-eastern parts of Papua New Guinea east of the Owen Stanley Range as it is separated in the range from the Australian plate by the Owen Stanley Fault Zone This extends along the southern border of the Goodenough Basin and through the southern part of Normanby Island in the D'Entrecasteaux Islands. This fault zone then becomes the Nubara Transform Fault that strikes north-east towards the Solomon Islands but is only related to the Trobriand microplate until the Trobriand Trough is reached. The north eastern plate boundary is the Trobriand Trough. Woodlark Island is on the area of the Trobriand plate as the Nubara Transform Fault is to its south-east. The western end of the New Britain Trench terminates at the Trobriand plate.

== Geology ==
Within the Trobriand plate is the unigue to today's earth, the youngest (7–5 million year old) metamorphic core complexes formed of sedimentary rocks that have been subject to high and ultra–high–pressure, as well as gneissic domes that are being rapid emplaced at between 1–2 cm/year (0.39–0.79 in/year) vertically. The metamorphic core complexes include the Suckling–Dayman massif of south-eastern New Guinea and the Emo Metamorphics which have some characteristics shared with back-arc basin basalts. The gneissic domes along the volcanic front include the D'Entrecasteaux Islands and Misima Island.

=== Tectonics ===
The Trobriand plate is located in a very complex tectonic environment between the current Australian plate to the south and the South Bismarck plate and Pacific plate to the north. This environment has been intensively studied in the last 20 years and these studies have contributed to the resolution of important tectonic theory issues. They have also created inconsistencies with observation as opposed to prediction from historic tectonic modelling. This for example means that the Woodlark plate must be a small, almost triangular shaped oceanic tectonic plate, rather than one that included continental eastern portions of Papua New Guinea. These portions must now be assigned to either the Trobriand plate or if it is now fixed with respect to the Solomon Sea plate, a larger Solomon Sea plate. GNS data can not resolve this issue as a smaller Solomon Sea plate is all underwater.

The Trobriand plate must have been in the fairly recent past an independent microplate, and likely still is. The evidence for a separate Trobriand plate includes:

- Multibeam bathymetry data available from 2004 onward. This and seismic profiles along the Trobriand Trough show a prominent deformation front in the trench that either currently or historically defines the southern boundary of the Solomon Sea plate. Also the 1983–4 R/V Natsushima cruise report notes "Trobriand Trough is a subduction system and deformation in the surface sediments suggests recent tectonic activity".
- Petrologic data from recent volcanoes south of the trough show they were formed by subduction. These granite plutons and calc–alkaline volcanics are from the middle Miocene (after 15 million years ago) through to the recent Holocene in age.
- Heat flow profiles to the south of the Trobriand Trough are those seen with subduction.
- The middle and ends of the trough have fair shallow seismic activity. It has been noted that those that proposed first in the 1990s that low seismic activity was against the existence of a Trobriand plate did not have access to the better seismic data of the last few decades.
- There is high seismic activity, as would be expected, with a triple junction, at the eastern termination of the Trobriand Trough with the north-east to south-west trending right–lateral Nubaru strike–slip fault.
- Bathymetric data consistent with the Nubara Fault extending south-westerly from its previous characterisation and intersecting the western part of the Woodlark Spreading Center and so creating a continuous major tectonic boundary on the northern side of the Woodlark plate. The southern termination of the Nubara Fault is at the southern side of the Egum Graben where there is a cluster of right–lateral strike slip and normal fault earthquakes, consistent with another triple junction.
- Gravity studies are consistent with the Trobriand Trough having itself a negative free-air gravity anomaly (FAA) with a large positive (> 200 mGal) FAA along the Trobriand outer forearc high, paralleled by a small negative FAA associated with the Trobriand forearc sedimentary basin as expected for a current or recently subducting feature.
- The Wadati-Benioff zone associated with a south-dipping subducted slab from Solomon Sea plate subduction under the Trobriand plate is well defined now from surface earthquakes to those 125 km (78 mi) deep.
- The increased number of Euler poles compared to a 3 plate solution fit observed data better.
- Any current subduction at the Trobriand Trough can be modelled as very slow explaining the remaining current seisographic inactivity for some portions of the Trobriand Trough, with subduction at the Trobriand Trough ranging from 4.5–4.8 cm/year (1.8–1.9 in/year).
- Certain historic difficulties with the emplacement via shallow normal faults of the western metamorphic core complexes and gneissic domes due to the apparent shortness of the permitting faults is perhaps better resolved with a four plate model.
- That if the western end of the New Britain Trench, which is where the Solomon Sea plate subducts under the South Bismarck plate/Pacific plate, terminates at the Trobriand plate if this exists is a much simpler tectonic model than that implicate in a larger Solomon Sea plate on this northern boundary.

Against a current separate Trobriant plate is the evidence that:

- The Trobriand Trough contains large thrust sheets, spaced 5–7 km (3.1–4.3 mi) apart at the western landward slope of the trough, ponding sediments behind them and this is consistent with fairly recent convergence, and this would if current could fix the Trobriant plate against the Solomon Sea plate.
- It is possible to model with the available data a three plate solution with a large Solomon Sea plate undertaking all the north westward rotation and interactions with the Pacific, Australian and Woodlark plates. However one of the Euler poles of such a model does not fit well with observed data.

=== Other Tectonic relationships ===
Much of the historic academic tectonic plate literature up to 2016, in some cases, and later in popular literature, had the Woodlark plate as originally proposed to be somewhat larger than current proposals, extending to the west along the east coast of New Guinea and subducting beneath the Caroline plate along its northern border. This model had the Maoke plate with a convergent boundary on its west, the Australian plate converging on the south, and on the east an undefined compressive zone which that marked the boundary with the adjoining to the north Solomon Sea plate. It was also in this model contacting the South Bismarck plate to the north-east. Interestingly subduction at the Trobriand Trough was originally assumed in this historic model, but at a rate that proved to be quite incompatible with actual data.

Most of the Woodlark plate's originally assigned area and boundary activity are now assigned to a combination of the Australian plate and Solomon Sea minor plate. The northern Trobriand plate will assume the subduction at the New Britain Trench that a larger Solomon Sea plate has assigned. These assignments are partially informed by GNS studies over a decade after the original 2003 Bird model. This showed that the Woodlark Basin region had distinctly different movements from a "Trobriand Block" and multiple eastern New Guinea land "Blocks" so that it was possible to define up to 5 distinct crustal blocks with possible independent movement, that others later interpreted as components of the differing microplates.

== See also ==
- Woodlark Basin – Oceanic basin located to the east of the island of New Guinea
- Woodlark plate – Small tectonic plate located to the east of the island of New Guinea
- Solomon Sea plate – Minor tectonic plate near the Solomon Islands archipelago in the Pacific Ocean
