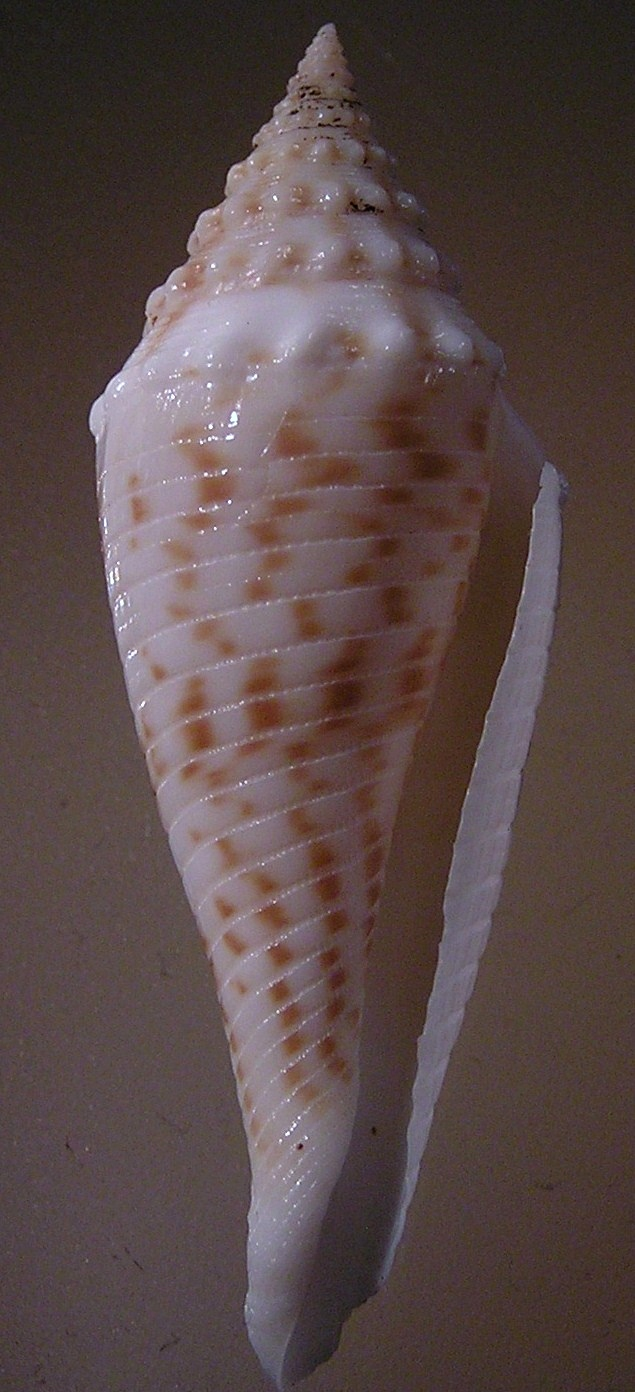
- Apertural view of a shell of Conasprella elokismenos

Scientific classification
- Kingdom: Animalia
- Phylum: Mollusca
- Class: Gastropoda
- Subclass: Caenogastropoda
- Order: Neogastropoda
- Superfamily: Conoidea
- Family: Conidae
- Genus: Conasprella
- Species: C. elokismenos

Binomial name
- Conasprella elokismenos (Kilburn, 1975)

Synonyms
- Bathyconus elokismenos (Kilburn, 1975); Bathyconus orbignyi elokismenos Kilburn, 1975; Conasprella (Fusiconus) elokismenos (Kilburn, 1975) · accepted, alternate representation; Conus elokismenos Kilburn, 1975; Conus orbignyi aratus Kilburn, 1973 (Invalid: junior homonym of Conus aratus Gabb, 1873; Conus orbignyi elokismenos is a replacement name); Conus orbignyi elokismenos Kilburn, 1975

= Conasprella elokismenos =

Species of gastropod

Conasprella elokismenos is a species of sea snail, a marine gastropod mollusk in the family Conidae, commonly known as cone snails.

Like all species within the genus Conasprella, these snails are predatory and venomous. These snails are known for their cone shaped shells and their venomous sting used to capture prey.

== Description ==
The size of an adult shell varies between 45 mm and 68 mm. They have a sleek, elongated, and conical shape, like other members of the Conasprella genus. The shell is smooth and glossy, featuring intricate patterns and banding, which can vary in colour. Many cone snails have shades of white, cream, brown, or orange with darker markings which gives them a striking appearance.

These snails have a tube-like struncture that they use to detect prey, and like other cone snails, they have a venomous harpoon-like radula for hunting small marine creatures.

== Distribution ==
This marine species occurs in the Indo-Pacific off Madagascar and KwaZuluNatal, South Africa; also in the Bismarck Sea off Papua New Guinea. They are found in tropical and subtropical marine environments. They tend to inhabit sandy or rocky areas, at depths ranging from shallow waters to the deeper ocean zones.
