= Caroline plate =

Minor oceanic tectonic plate north of New Guinea

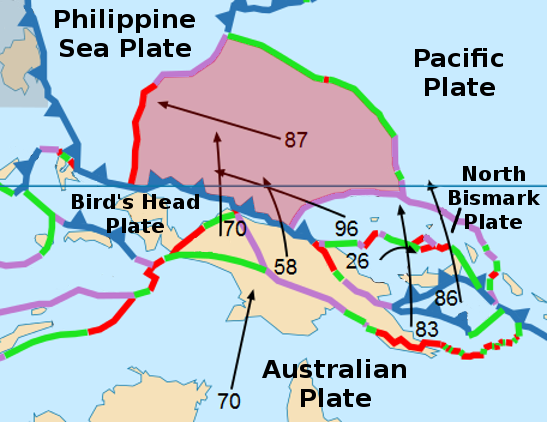
- The Caroline plate is shown with red shading in this map of local tectonic features from Bird's 2003 model. Further definition of some of the plate boundaries implied in the map has occurred in the southeast since.
- Type: Minor
- Approximate area: 1,700,000 km^{2} (660,000 sq mi)
- Movement^{1}: north-west
- Speed^{1}: 87 mm/year
- Features: Pacific Ocean
- ^{1}Relative to the African plate

The Caroline plate is a minor tectonic plate that straddles the Equator in the Eastern Hemisphere located north of New Guinea. It forms a subduction zone along the border with the Bird's Head plate and other minor plates of the New Guinea region to the south. A transform boundary forms the northern border with the Pacific plate. Along the border with the Philippine Sea plate is a convergent boundary that transitions into a rift.

The Caroline plate was first proposed as a distinct plate by Weissel & Anderson 1978.

== Geological setting ==
A separate terrane with its own tectonic history, the Caroline plate has been considered part of the Pacific plate because of sparse seismicity and low velocities along its boundaries. It includes the West and East Caroline basins and the inactive Eauripik Rise separating them, but neither the Caroline Islands nor the Caroline Ridge. It is subducting under the Bird's Head and the plates or blocks associated with the present Australian plate along the New Guinea Trench to the south.

The boundary with the Philippine Sea to the west has two segments: the southern segment, the Ayu Trough was spreading at a rate of 8 mm/yr c. 25–2 Ma but has been slowing down since. The northern segment, the Palau and southern Yap trenches, is not an active subduction zone as indicated by the lack of active volcanoes. The Caroline-Pacific boundary is a complex, evolving system partly and potentially developing into a subduction zone. The south-east boundary, along the Manus Trench, is a convergent boundary, but in the absence of active volcanoes and earthquakes, is not a subduction zone at present. This is the boundary of the Caroline plate with the North Bismarck plate, which is believed to be a relic plate currently moving with the Pacific plate. Beyond the North Bismarck plate to the south is an area with currently actively independently moving microplates such as the South Bismarck plate, the Solomon Sea plate and the Woodlark plate.

== Tectonic history ==
The Caroline plate moves at velocities very close to those of the Pacific plate and its age of formation and current status as an independent plate are uncertain. There is a very slow rate of spreading between the Caroline and Philippine plates, but the Caroline plate apparently moved together with both the Philippine and New Guinea plates during the Neogene.

The Caroline Ridge, to the north, meets the Caroline plate at the Sorol Trough at which there some evidence of oblique extension; the Caroline Ridge, however, is, although of uncertain origin, made of oceanic crust and probably the product of a hotspot. The presence of a trench and indications of subduction beneath the Pacific plate is suggestive but the absence of island arcs, which could be expected from substantial subduction in the past, makes the development along this boundary unclear.

The Caroline plate was, under all circumstances, a separate plate in the past. The boundary along its eastern side, the Mussau Trench, must have been an important boundary since magnetic anomalies on the Caroline plate are Oligocene but those on the Pacific plate Cretaceous. There are indications of spreading in the Caroline Sea 34–27 Ma. If the Caroline plate moved with the Pacific plate there should be clear evidences of a corresponding subduction beneath New Guinea, of which there is virtually none. The Ayu Trough is a slow spreading zone that opened 15 Ma.

Before about 6 million years ago as the Ontong Java Plateau and Indo-Australian plate collided the Bismarck Sea was initially formed as a back-arc basin behind the New Britain arc, and after the collision, a transpressional zone developed in what is now the west Bismarck Sea, associated with subduction of the Caroline plate and North Bismarck plate at the New Guinea Trench.
