= Maoke plate =

Small tectonic plate in western New Guinea

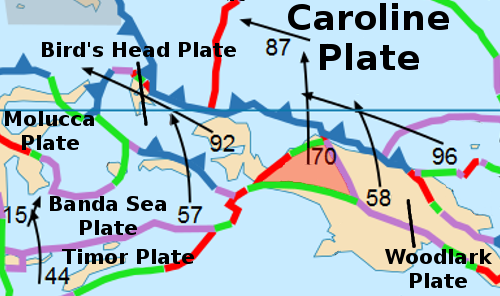
- Maoke plate's proposed relationships in Bird's 2003 model of tectonic plates.
- Type: Minor
- Movement^{1}: north
- Speed^{1}: 70mm/year
- Features: New Guinea
- ^{1}Relative to the African plate

The Maoke plate is a small tectonic plate located in western New Guinea underlying the Sudirman Range from which the highest mountain on the island- Puncak Jaya rises. To its east was proposed a convergent boundary with the Woodlark plate, although this is now best modelled after further studies as a boundary with an enlarged Solomon Sea plate or a new microplate called the Trobriand plate. To the south lies a transform boundary with the Australian plate and the Bird's Head plate lies to the west.
