= Yap Trench =

Oceanic trench in the western Pacific Ocean

Coordinates: 10°N 138°E

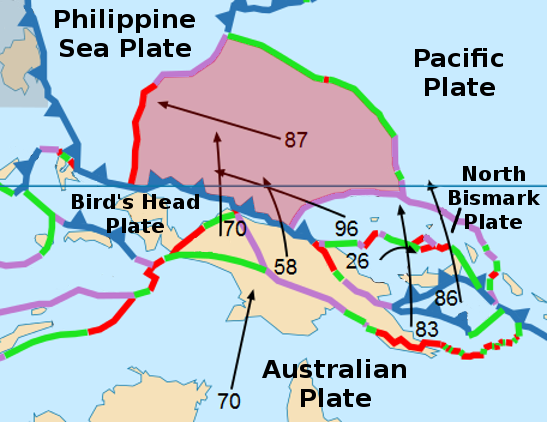
The Caroline Plate, shown in maroon, is moving roughly towards the northwest and subducting through the Yap and Palau trenches, shown together as the pink line bordering the Philippine Sea Plate. This area is directly southwest of the Mariana Trench.

The Yap Trench, also known as the West Caroline Trench, is an oceanic trench near Yap Island in the western Pacific Ocean. The trench is roughly J-shaped and is 650 kilometres (400 mi) long and 8,527 metres (27,976 ft) deep at its deepest point. The trench is located on the southeastern edge of the Philippine Sea Plate and forms the part of the Pacific Ring of Fire between the Palau Islands and the Mariana Trench.

Researchers believe that the Yap Trench was formed during a classic intraoceanic subduction event, and that the trench is an example of early subduction zone development in the western Pacific. Studies are ongoing as to whether the trench is active. The Caroline Ridge collided with the Yap Trench at one point, effectively dividing the trench's tectonic evolution into two parts. Sato et al. observed in 1997 that microseismic activity in the trench was similar to that of active subduction zones, and Nagihara et al. noted large amounts of negative gravity along the trench, suggesting that a force was being exerted upon the crust beneath it.

Recent studies agree and elaborate on these observations. Using seismic tomography, researchers showed that locations of modern earthquakes are especially concentrated in zones of high seismic velocity, which are indicative of solid rock in the mantle, and likely represent earthquakes caused by the subduction of the Caroline Plate.

They further showed that subduction of the Caroline Plate is complex. It appears that subduction progressed until it was halted as the thick Southern Caroline Plateau (SCP) reached the subduction zone. The section of plate immediately east of the SCP was relatively new and still ductile, and seems to have broken and sunk into the asthenosphere. The resulting rebound of the partially-subducted material may have caused a previously unexplained burst of volcanism along the Yap Arc sometime around 11-7 Mya.

Researchers also noted that their ocean bottom seismometers showed a two-layer crust, like that found in Chile and Argentina, under much of the area around the Yap Trench. They believe this to be caused by the slab rebounding and reattaching to the oceanic crust above it. The upward buoyancy could explain the previously mentioned force being exerted on the crust beneath the trench.

The rest of the subducted Caroline slab, north of the SCP, can be seen as high-velocity areas in seismic tomographs. Intriguingly, it appears to have subducted and then overturned in the mantle. It is suggested this is due to a high rate of slab-pull with respect to overall plate movement, combined with the effects of asthenosphere wind pushing the plate to the west. However, the slab seems to have stopped subducting as the North Caroline Plateau (NCP) has reached the trench. This is probably because the NCP is very close to the southern end of the Mariana Trench, and rather than subduct, may stall until the currently subducted material breaks off, just like the southern end of the slab.
