= New Britain subduction zone =

Subduction zone under the western Pacific Ocean

- Approximate surface projection on Pacific Ocean of subduction features and high earthquake activity near the New Britain subduction zone. The earthquake activity can be due to other tectonic processes than subduction, but does hint at where subducted slabs may be. Key: Up to 70 km (43 mi) deep shallow-focus earthquakes; 70–300 km (43–186 mi) deep shallow-focus earthquakes; More than 300 km (190 mi) deep shallow-focus earthquakes; (blue) Active subduction trenches; (light blue) Inactive trenches; (brown) Selected oceanic floor ridges; (yellow) Spreading centers or rifts; Postulated active tectonic transform boundaries are not shown to reduce map complexity as direction of movement can not be shown.; Click, then mouse-over shows feature names.
- Etymology: New Britain

Tectonics
- Plate: Australian, New Hebrides
- Status: Active
- Earthquakes: Up to M_{w} 8.1
- Age: Miocene-current

The New Britain subduction zone is one of the most recently formed and most active subduction zones on Earth, producing great earthquakes (magnitude 8.1 or greater), with potential for tsunami hazard, and being associated with active volcanism, as part of the Pacific Ring of Fire. It has a close relationship to an area of subduction tectonic activity that extends south eastward from New Britain to the Vanuatu subduction zone, involving the northeastern portion of the Australian plate and its complicated collision dynamics with the southwestern portion of the Pacific plate.

== Geography ==
The subduction zone is under the eastern part of New Guinea and the islands of New Britain and New Ireland, with associated volcanoes and volcanic seamounts being in the zone, and with the New Britain Trench marking the current subduction boundary. The trench is up to 9,046 m (29,678 ft) deep. To the zone's south east are the San Cristobal Trench (South Solomon Trench) and New Hebrides trenches with beyond them to the east the Solomon Islands and Vanuatu. Further away from the area of current subduction is most of New Guinea itself to the west and to the north and east, the now inactive ocean floor structures of the West Melanesian Trench (Melanesian Trench, Manus Trench), the North Solomon Trench and the Vityaz Trench .

=== Geology ===
The active Quaternary New Britain volcanic arc, has volcanic rock composition consistent with a highly depleted source magma from dehydrated oceanic crust with little sediment. The islands have Upper Eocene basement rocks of coralline limestone and volcanics overlain by Upper Oligocene volcaniclastic formations with plutonic intrusions. Carbonates overlay these and were deposited in the Early to Middle Miocene. Pleistocene to Holocene coral reefs fringe many of the islands. The Solomon Sea bottom is predominantly E-type MORB between 28 and 34 million years old and mudrocks.

==== Tectonics ====
The New Britain subduction zone is an example of polarity-reversal subduction initiation, where a new subduction zone is created in a back-arc region with the opposite direction of subduction to that previously operating between two major plates. The major plates in this case are the Australian and Pacific plates. However a number of minor plates, both active and now inactive (relic) have formed during the change in polarity. These presently active minor plates include the South Bismarck plate to the north of the New Britain subduction zone and the main subducting Solomon Sea plate and its adjacent to the east Trobriand plate. The rates of subduction and roll back are high and are currently for the New Britain Trench, a subduction velocity of 6.5–12.0 cm/year (2.6–4.7 in/year), a convergence velocity of 0.2–4.8 cm/year (0.079–1.890 in/year), and spreading deformation rate in its arc-back- arc area of 1.0–7.4 cm/year (0.39–2.91 in/year). In various parts of the trench there is up to 18 cm/year (7.1 in/year) of trench roll back and 2.0 cm/year (0.79 in/year) of trench advance.

The New Britain subduction zone is a continuum with the south Solomon's and Vanuatu subduction, which are also polarity-reversal. It is possible that the collision to the west of the 30–35 km (19–22 mi) thick Ontong Java Plateau with the Vitiaz Trench from about 25 million years ago initiated this polarity reversal.

However while current tectonics may be well understood, historic tectonics beyond a few million years ago, if that, are poorly understood. The models as developed have been pointed out to be quite inconsistent with the older geology, land fault structures or even the alkaline volcanism of the Tabar, Lihir, Tanga and Feni Islands.

==== Seismicity ====
The region is seismically active with twenty two earthquakes with magnitudes equal to or more than 7.5 in 115 years including two M_{w} 8.1 earthquakes. There is tsunami risk, particularly with great earthquakes. In the area under New Britain and in the area between New Ireland and Bougainville Island the majority of the earthquakes are associated with subduction and in the later portion a subducted slab can be mapped by seismicity to reach a maximum depth close to 660 km (410 mi). There are however many known faults and fault zones, for example the Weitin Fault in Southern New Ireland. This is a transform fault between the South Bismarck plate and the Pacific plate, associated with the 16th of November events of the 2000 New Ireland earthquakes. The Bismarck Sea Seismic Delineation is an active transform fault zone that separates the suspected relic North Bismarck plate (i.e. Pacific plate) from the South Bismark plate to the north of the subduction zone.

==== Volcanism ====
Approximate map of current volcanic activity near the New Britain subduction zone. Back arc spreading centers are shown as red lines.

The arc volcanoes are grouped into western, Willaumez Peninsula-Mount Ulawun and Rabaul areas. The Gazelle Volcanic Zone extends for 65 km (40 mi) across the central to northern part of the Gazelle Peninsula and the active Rabaul Caldera area to its north had eruptions that destroyed the port in 1994. The Solomon Islands are an active arc volcano chain. The spreading centers in the center of the Woodlark Basin are active volcanically but not manifest as activity on the surface of the ocean. There is probably no seafloor current volcanic activity associated with the Bismarck Sea Seismic Lineation but the Melanesian arc to its north is active. Active volcanism continues into both north-eastern and south-eastern New Guinea.
