= North Bismarck plate =

Small tectonic plate in the Bismarck Sea north of New Guinea

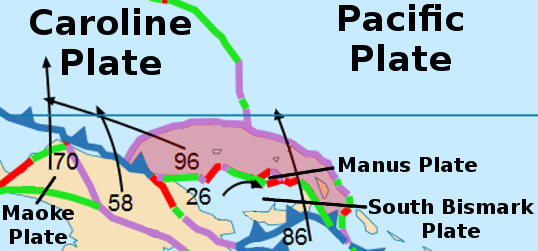
- The relationships of the presently inactive North Bismarck plate (red shading). While the map relates to a 2003 model where it was proposed to be still active, it is reasonably accurate compared to current understanding.
- Type: Minor
- Movement^{1}: north-west
- Speed^{1}: nil independent of Pacific plate which has 96 mm/year
- Features: Pacific Ocean
- ^{1}Relative to the African plate

The North Bismarck plate is a small tectonic plate located in the Bismarck Sea off the northeast coast of New Guinea. It is currently regarded as a relic or inactive plate by most. At one time it was called the Manus plate, but this term was later used for a modelled microplate at the south east boundary of the North Bismarck plate.

== Tectonics ==
The plate contains most of the Melanesian arc volcanoes, related to current and historic arc volcanism, except those of New Britain which are on the active South Bismarck plate.

To the north it has collided with the Pacific plate and the Caroline plate, part of the western part is subducting under other active plates in New Guinea, and it is separated from the South Bismarck plate by a divergent boundary called the Bismarck Seismic Sea Lineation (BSSL). The BSSL is a very seismically active area but the assigned shallow earthquakes tend to be less than magnitude 7. The plate is moving westerly along with the Pacific plate. Between the plate and the Caroline plate is the West Melanesian Trench and between the plate and the Pacific plate is the Kilinailau Trench. Neither trench has good evidence for current subduction activity but were certainly historically active. There are a few shallow low intensity earthquakes to the south/south west of these trenches on a line of the old arc that extends from the smaller northern Admiralty Islands in the west through to Mussau Island and beyond.

== See also ==
- List of earthquakes in Papua New Guinea
