= Bismarck Sea =

Marginal sea of the Pacific Ocean

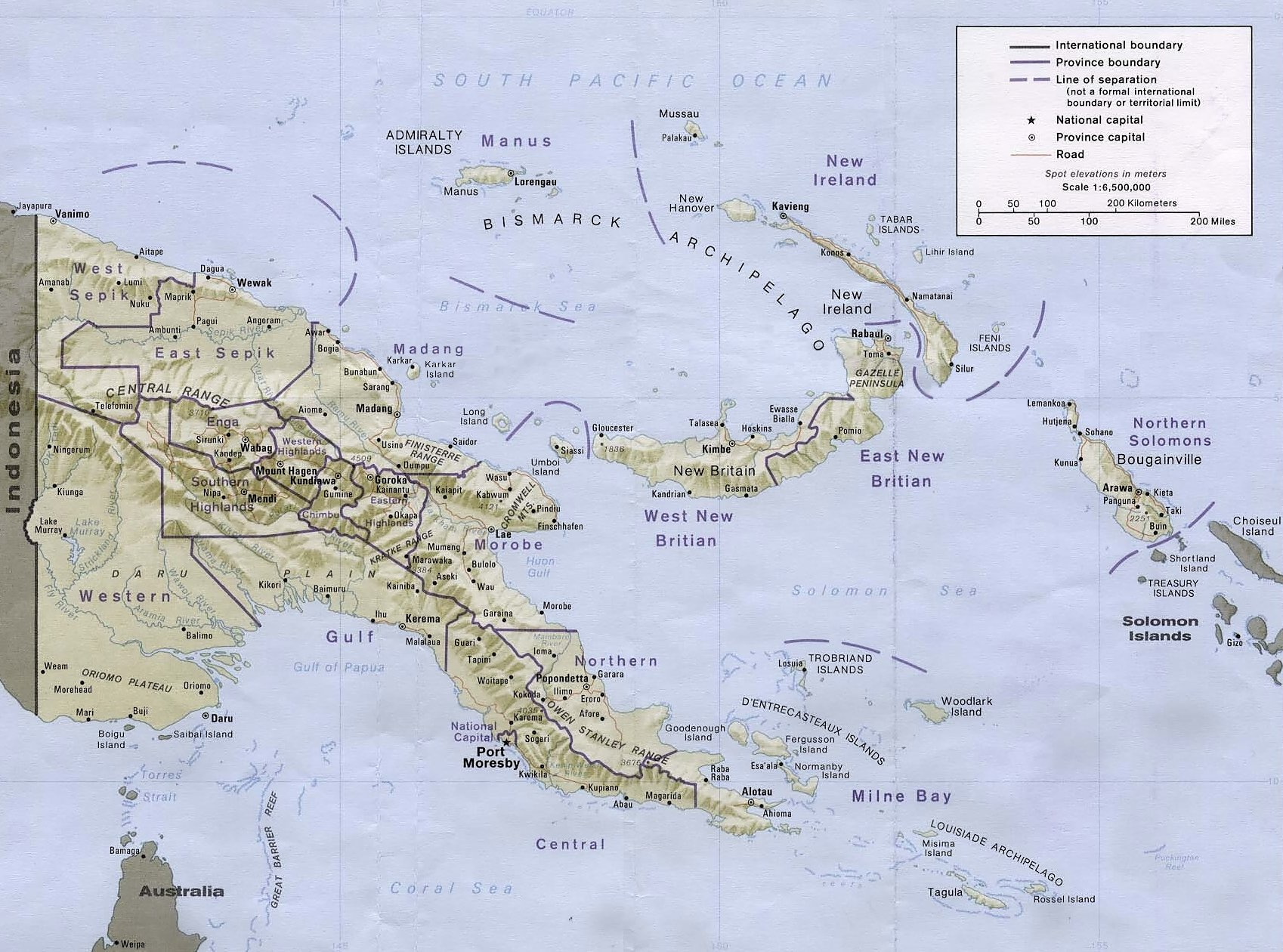
- Bismarck Sea in Papua New Guinea

- Location within Papua New Guinea
- Location: Oceania
- Coordinates: 4°S 148°E
- Type: Sea
- Etymology: Otto von Bismarck
- Part of: Pacific Ocean
- Basin countries: Papua New Guinea
- Surface area: 250,400 km^{2} (96,700 sq mi)
- Settlements: Madang

The Bismarck Sea (German: Bismarcksee, pronounced ['bɪsmarkzeː]) lies in the south-western Pacific Ocean within the Papua New Guinean exclusive economic zone. It is located north-east of the island of New Guinea and south of the Bismarck Archipelago. It has coastlines in districts of the Islands Region, Momase Region, and Papua Region.

== Geography ==
Like the Bismarck Archipelago, it is named in honour of the first German Chancellor Otto von Bismarck. (Note: In English the only recognised name is Bismarck Sea. Not all languages use this translated term, particularly in north-eastern Europe. For example Jaungvinejas jūra (Latvian) or Morze Nowogwinejskie (Polish). In 2007, the Ministry of the Interior and Administration of Poland, changed the name of the area, used in Polish language, from Morze Bismarcka in a decision that was upheld in 2022. This was done due to historic controversies surrounding Bismarck in Poland.) The Bismarck Archipelago extends round to the east and north of the sea, enclosing the Bismarck Sea and separating it from the Southern Pacific Ocean. To the south it is linked to the Solomon Sea by the Vitiaz Strait.

=== Official boundaries ===
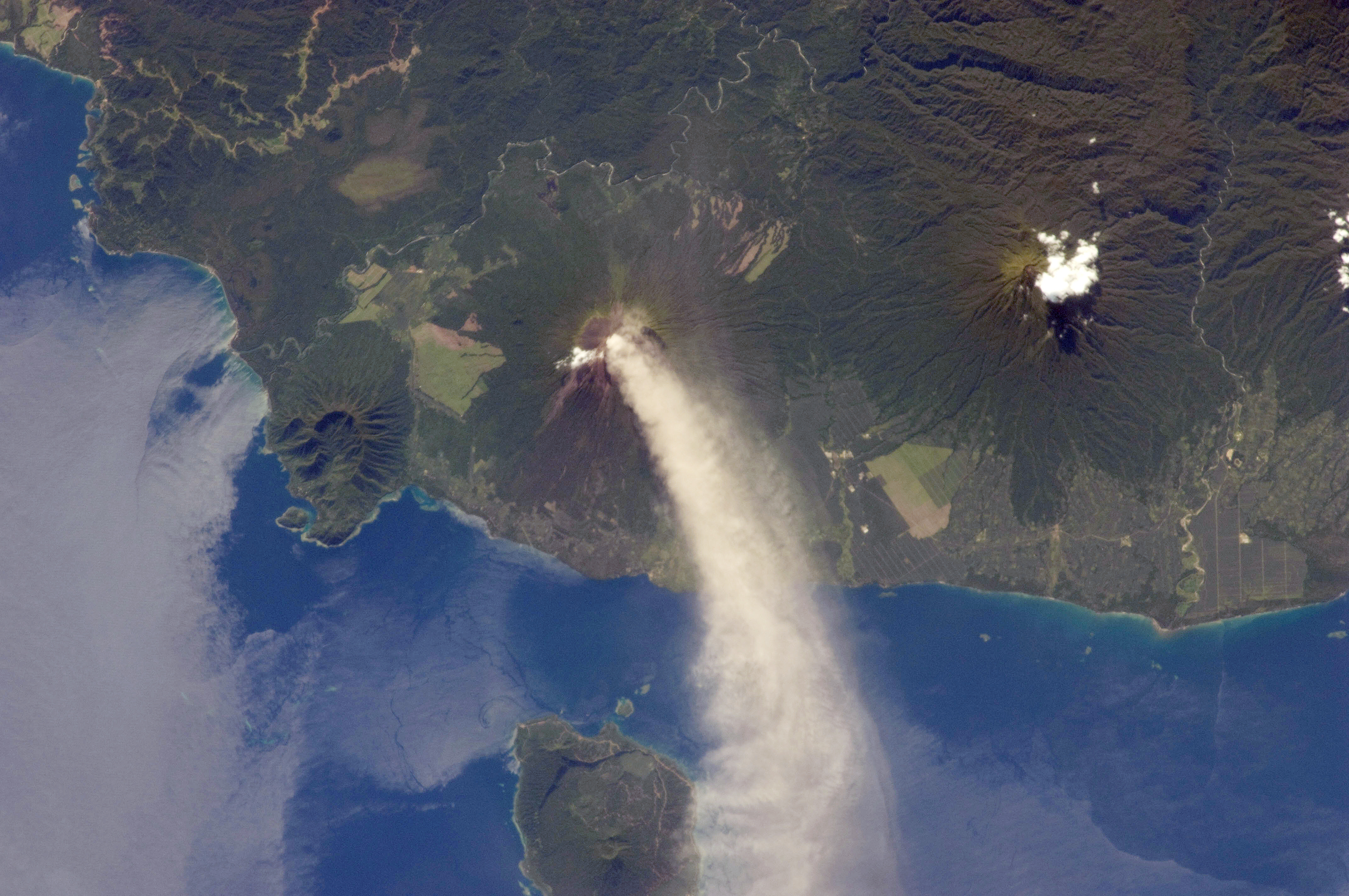
Ulawun Volcano and Lolobau Island in the Bismarck Sea.

The International Hydrographic Organization defines the Bismarck Sea as "that area of the South Pacific Ocean off the northeast coast of New Guinea", with the following limits:

On the North and East. By the Northern and Northeastern coasts of the islands of New Ireland, New Hanover, the Admiralty Islands, Hermit Island, and the Ninigo Group, through Manu and Aua Islands to Wuvulu Island and thence a line to Baudissin Point in New Guinea (142°02'E).

On the Southeast. A line from the Southern point of New Ireland along the parallel of 4°50' South to the coast of New Britain, along its Northern coast and thence a line from its Western extreme through the Northern point of Umboi Island to Teliata Point, New Guinea (5°55′S 147°24′E)

On the Southwest. By the Northeast coast of New Guinea.

=== Geology ===
The geology is related to the tectonic processes that have produced the underlying South Bismarck Plate and the relic North Bismarck Plate. These processes have created the Melanesian arc volcanoes and explain the many earthquakes under the sea.

==== Mineral wealth ====
Explorations in the Bismarck Sea seabed yielded discoveries of mineral-rich beds of sulfides, copper, zinc, silver and gold. These findings are especially important because they lie in shallow, calm waters. Papua New Guinea owns the mining rights to these minerals under international law.

=== Important Bird Area ===
Some 5,200 km^{2} of the Bismarck Sea, between the north-eastern end of New Britain and New Ireland, has been recognised as an Important Bird Area (IBA) by BirdLife International because it apparently supports a population of Beck's petrels, following sightings at sea of this rare and enigmatic species, of which the breeding grounds remain undiscovered.

== History ==
It was the site of a major Japanese naval defeat in the Battle of the Bismarck Sea during World War II on 3 and 4 March 1943.

== See also ==
- Bismarck Sea topics
- Karkar Island
- Shipwrecks in the Bismarck Sea
