= South Bismarck plate =

Small tectonic plate in the southern Bismarck Sea

- Approximate surface projections of active tectonic plates. Key: South Bismarck plate, Solomon Sea plate, Trobriand plate, Woodlark plate, Active trench subduction boundaries, Inactive trench subduction boundaries, current spreading boundary. The Australian plate to the southeast and the Pacific plate to the northwest are not shown, but their complex collision has created these microplates. Click and then mouse over shows feature names.
- Type: Minor
- Movement^{1}: north-east
- Speed^{1}: 26mm/year
- Features: Pacific Ocean
- ^{1}Relative to the African plate

The South Bismarck plate is a small tectonic plate located mainly in the southern Bismarck Sea. The eastern part of New Guinea and the island of New Britain are on this plate. It is associated with high earthquake and volcanic activity as part of the New Britain subduction zone within the Pacific Ring of Fire.

== Tectonics ==
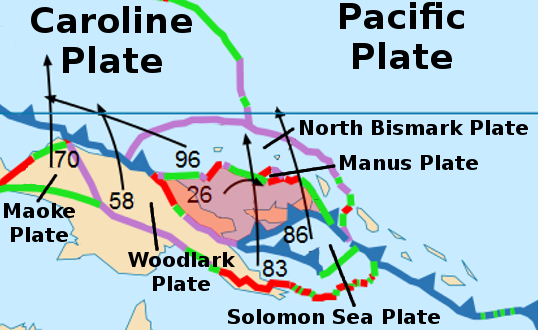
The South Bismark microplate in relation to some nearby tectonic features. The labelling and size of other plates, in particular, the Woodlark plate, is inconsistent with subsequent observational data, not available for this 2003 tectonic model.

Convergent boundaries line the southern border including the New Britain subduction zone that contributed to the formation of New Britain and the Solomon Islands. Many earthquakes occur in this area particularly around New Britain, which has very complex tectonics and defining all the active plate boundaries has proved challenging. To the south of the South Bismark plate is the Solomon Sea plate which is subducting under New Britain at the New Britain Trench and a likely still active Trobriand plate which has fault zone relationships at the postulated plate boundary.

GPS data shows the South Bismarck plate, though north of the Australian plate boundary, is being pushed by Australia in a northerly direction while the area of the historic North Bismarck plate is being dragged or pushed by the Pacific plate to the west. The North Bismark plate does not have detectable independent motion to the Pacific plate and most believe it to be a relic plate. Accordingly, as the west-northwest motion of the North Bismarck microplate is similar to that of the Pacific plate, most of the Melanesian arc which is to the east of the New Ireland can be regarded as fixed on the Pacific plate. The line separating the North and South Bismarck plates is called the Bismarck Sea Seismic Lineation (BSSL). This line is ill-defined, but is associated with shallow earthquakes, with poor definition of BSSL associated earthquakes that become mixed with subduction associated earthquakes towards the southwest and New Ireland. These subduction associated earthquakes, unlike at the other plate boundaries, are often magnitude 7 or above and the area around southern New Ireland has a very high concentration of such.

The plate boundaries to the east, mainly within New Guinea are also complex, although as for all the postulated plate boundaries, current shallow earthquake activity acts as a guide. New Guinea's Finistree Block is usually mapped into the plate.

== See also ==
- List of earthquakes in Papua New Guinea
