= Solomon Sea plate =

Minor tectonic plate near the Solomon Islands archipelago in the Pacific Ocean

- Approximate surface projections of active tectonic plates. Key: Solomon Sea plate , South Bismarck plate, Trobriand plate, Woodlark plate, Active trench subduction boundaries, Inactive trench subduction boundaries, current spreading boundary. The Australian plate to the southeast and the Pacific plate to the northwest are not shown, but their complex collision has created these microplates. Click and then mouse over shows feature names.
- Type: Minor
- Approximate area: 250,000 km^{2} (97,000 sq mi)
- Movement^{1}: north
- Speed^{1}: 86mm/year
- Features: Pacific Ocean
- ^{1}Relative to the African plate

The Solomon Sea plate (also known as the Solomon plate) is a minor tectonic plate to the northwest of the Solomon Islands archipelago in the south Pacific Ocean. It roughly corresponds with the Solomon Sea east of Papua New Guinea. The plate boundaries are associated with high earthquake activity as part of the New Britain subduction zone.

== Tectonics ==
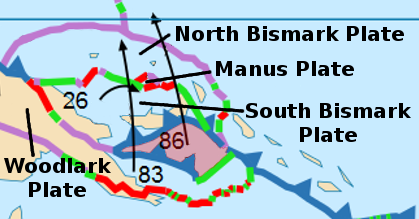
The red shading indicates the approximate location of the Solomon microplate. The labelling and size of the Woodlark plate is mistaken as is based on a now replaced 2003 tectonic model.

The tectonic regime in this part of the world is extremely complex and involves a number of minor as well as major plates. The Solomon Sea plate is an oceanic crustal plate remnant which is likely disappearing into three subduction zones, to its north, east and west. Its southeast margin runs along the Woodlark Rise, which extends into a transform fault called the Nubara Transform Fault marking the boundary with the adjoining Woodlark plate.

The northern subduction zone is located where the Solomon plate is diving below the South Bismarck plate to the northwest and the Pacific plate to the northeast at the New Britain Trench. This is area is extremely active seismologically. The northwest part of the subduction zone is called the New Britain Subduction Zone. New Britain in Papua New Guinea is the volcanic island formed from this collision and resulting volcanism. The complexities of its known geology, that of its island neighbour of New Ireland and the known Tabar, Lihir, Tanga and Feni Islands groups with undersaturated alkaline volcanics, some of which have been recently active, may not have resulted in a single accepted tectonic model to the north of the Solomon Sea plate that explains all observed features.

The southwestern subduction zone is where the Solomon Sea plate has been diving below the former Indo-Australian plate and has complexities still not fully resolved, but suggesting the possibility of a still active Trobriand plate separating it from the present Australian plate. If the Trobriand plate is presently fixed along the Solomon Sea plate's definite former subduction zone of the Trobriand Trough with the Solomon Sea plate, the Solomon Sea plate becomes quite a large microplate with much more complex tectonics. Accordingly, at this time more details on such tectonics are in the article on the Trobriand plate on the assumption that the Trobriand Trough is still an active subducting plate boundary.

== See also ==
- List of earthquakes in Papua New Guinea
