= List of earthquakes in 2002 =

Earthquakes in 2002
Approximate epicenters of notable earthquakes in 2002
- 4.0–5.9 magnitude
- 6.0–6.9 magnitude
- 7.0–7.9 magnitude
- 8.0+ magnitude
- Strongest: 7.9 M_{w} United States
- Deadliest: 6.1 M_{w} (Afghanistan) Afghanistan; 2,000 deaths
- Total fatalities: 2,699

Number by magnitude
- 9.0+: 0
- 8.0–8.9: 0
- 7.0–7.9: 13
- 6.0–6.9: 126
- 5.0–5.9: 1,169
- 4.0–4.9: 8,479

This is a list of earthquakes in 2002. Only earthquakes of magnitude 6 or above are included, unless they result in significant damage and/or casualties. All dates are listed according to UTC time. The maximum intensities are based on the Modified Mercalli intensity scale. Earthquake magnitudes are based on data from the USGS. Like previous years, seismic activity was relatively moderate in the year 2002, being the first year since 1999 with no magnitude 8.0+ earthquakes. Up to 2,700 people died in earthquakes throughout 2002, most of them due to three relatively moderate but heavily-damaging events in northeastern Afghanistan. The largest earthquake of the year measured M_{w} 7.9 and struck near Denali in Alaska, making it the most powerful earthquake to strike the United States since 1986, and the largest Alaskan earthquake to occur inland. Other notable events also struck Iran, Turkey, Papua New Guinea, Pakistan, Italy and the Philippines.

== Compared to other years ==
Number of earthquakes worldwide for 1999–2009 []
Magnitude	1999	2000	2001	2002	2003	2004	2005	2006	2007	2008	2009
8.0–9.9	0	1	1	0	1	2	1	2	4	1	1
7.0–7.9	18	15	14	13	14	14	10	9	14	12	16
6.0–6.9	117	145	122	126	139	141	139	142	178	167	143
5.0–5.9	1,057	1,334	1,212	1,170	1,212	1,511	1,694	1,726	2,090	1,786	1,912
4.0–4.9	7,004	7,968	7,969	8,479	8,455	10,880	13,893	12,843	12,081	12,294	6,817
Total	8,296	9,462	9,319	9,788	9,823	12,551	15,738	14,723	14,367	14,261	8,891

== By death toll ==
Rank	Death toll	Magnitude	Location	MMI	Depth (km)	Date	Event
1	2,000	6.1	Afghanistan, Baghlan	VII (Very strong)	8.0	March 25	2002 Hindu Kush earthquakes
2	261	6.5	Iran, Qazvin	VIII (Severe)	10.0	June 22	2002 Bou'in-Zahra earthquake
3	169	7.4	Afghanistan, Badakhshan	VI (Strong)	225.6	March 3	2002 Hindu Kush earthquakes
4	50	5.9	Afghanistan, Baghlan	VII (Very strong)	10.0	April 12	2002 Hindu Kush earthquakes
5	46	6.5	Turkey, Afyonkarahisar	IX (Violent)	5.0	February 3	2002 Afyon earthquake
6	36	5.3	Papua New Guinea, Morobe	IV (Light)	80.5	April 1	2002 Morobe earthquake and landslide
7	29	5.9	Italy, Molise	VIII (Severe)	10.0	October 31	2002 Molise earthquakes
8	23	6.3	Pakistan, Gilgit-Baltistan	IX (Violent)	33.0	November 20	2002 Gilgit-Baltistan earthquakes
9	15	7.5	Philippines, Soccsksargen offshore	IX (Violent)	31.0	March 5	2002 Mindanao earthquake
10	17	5.4	Pakistan, Gilgit-Baltistan	VII (Very strong)	33.0	November 1	2002 Gilgit-Baltistan earthquakes

Listed are earthquakes with at least 10 dead.

== By magnitude ==
Rank	Magnitude	Death toll	Location	MMI	Depth (km)	Date	Event
1	7.9	0	United States, Alaska	IX (Violent)	4.2	November 3	2002 Denali earthquake
2	7.7	0	(Fiji) Eastern offshore	I (Not felt)	580.0	August 19	-
2	7.7	0	Fiji, Eastern offshore	I (Not felt)	675.4	August 19	-
4	7.6	6	Papua New Guinea, Sandaun offshore	X (Extreme)	13.0	September 8	2002 Sandaun earthquake
4	7.6	8	Indonesia, West Papua offshore	X (Extreme)	10.0	October 10	2002 West Papua earthquake
6	7.5	15	Philippines, Soccsksargen offshore	IX (Violent)	31.0	March 5	2002 Mindanao earthquake
7	7.4	169	Afghanistan, Badakhshan	VI (Strong)	225.6	March 3	2002 Hindu Kush earthquakes
7	7.4	3	Indonesia, Aceh offshore	VIII (Severe)	30.0	November 2	2002 Sumatra earthquake
9	7.3	0	China, Heilongjiang	I (Not felt)	566.0	June 2	-
9	7.3	0	Russia, Sakhalin offshore	III (Weak)	459.1	November 17	-
11	7.2	0	Vanuatu, Shefa offshore	X (Extreme)	21.0	January 2	2002 Port Vila earthquake
12	7.1	5	Taiwan, Yilan offshore	VIII (Severe)	32.8	March 31	2002 Taiwan earthquake
12	7.1	0	Guam offshore	VIII (Severe)	85.7	April 26	-

Listed are earthquakes with at least 7.0 magnitude.

== By month ==
=== January ===
January
- Strongest: 7.2 M_{w} Vanuatu
- Deadliest: 4.7 M_{w} (Democratic Republic of the Congo) Democratic Republic of the Congo; Several deaths
- Total fatalities: 6

Number by magnitude
- 9.0+: 0
- 8.0–8.9: 0
- 7.0–7.9: 1
- 6.0–6.9: 15
- 5.0–5.9: 107
- 4.0–4.9: 687

Date	Country and location	M_{w}	Depth (km)	MMI	Notes	Casualties	
Date	Country and location	M_{w}	Depth (km)	MMI	Notes	Dead	Injured
1	Pacific–Antarctic Ridge	6.0	10.0	-	-	-	-
1	Philippines, Davao, 3 km (1.9 mi) S of Lais	6.3	138.1	IV	-	-	-
2	Fiji, Central offshore, 36 km (22 mi) ENE of Suva	6.2	665.8	-	-	-	-
2	Vanuatu, Shefa offshore, 50 km (31 mi) WNW of Port Vila	7.2	21.0	X	Further information: 2002 Port Vila earthquake	-	Several
3	Afghanistan, Badakhshan, 77 km (48 mi) NNW of Parun	6.2	129.3	V	Foreshock of the 2002 Hindu Kush earthquakes. One person injured in the Mazar-e Sharif–Kabul area.	-	1
3	Vanuatu, Shefa offshore, 33 km (21 mi) WNW of Port Vila	6.6	10.0	VIII	Aftershock of the 2002 Port Vila earthquake.	-	-
9	Tajikistan, Districts under Central Government Jurisdiction, 12 km (7.5 mi) SSE of Roghun	5.3	33.0	VII	Three children killed, 54 people injured, 52 homes destroyed, 209 buildings and the Rogun Dam damaged in the epicentral area.	3	54
10	Papua New Guinea, Sandaun, 11 km (6.8 mi) SE of Aitape	6.7	11.0	X	One person killed, 200 houses and 250 water tanks destroyed in Aitape.	1	-
13	Papua New Guinea, East New Britain, 104 km (65 mi) E of Kimbe	6.4	43.6	VIII	-	-	-
15	Vanuatu, Shefa offshore, 77 km (48 mi) NW of Port Vila	6.0	10.0	VI	Aftershock of the 2002 Port Vila earthquake.	-	-
15	Indonesia, Banten offshore, 69 km (43 mi) W of Labuan	6.1	10.0	VII	-	-	-
15	Papua New Guinea, West New Britain, 106 km (66 mi) E of Kimbe	6.2	41.1	VII	Aftershock of the 6.4 event on January 13.	-	-
16	Mexico, Chiapas, 2 km (1.2 mi) SW of Las Brisas	6.4	41.1	VI	-	-	-
16	Democratic Republic of the Congo, South Kivu, 12 km (7.5 mi) SSE of Sake	4.7	15.4	VI	Several people killed and 307 buildings destroyed in the Gisenyi area, Rwanda.	Several	-
21	Turkey, Manisa, 6 km (3.7 mi) SSW of Gölmarmara	4.6	10.0	VII	One person killed in İzmir.	1	-
22	Greece, South Aegean offshore, 49 km (30 mi) NW of Fry	6.2	88.0	V	One person died of a heart attack in Antalya, Turkey.	1	-
28	Russia, Sakhalin offshore, 148 km (92 mi) SSW of Severo-Kuril’sk	6.1	33.0	V	-	-	-
28	Tonga, Niua offshore, 94 km (58 mi) NE of Hihifo	6.2	33.0	V	-	-	-
30	Papua New Guinea, West New Britain offshore, 113 km (70 mi) SE of Kimbe	6.0	33.0	VII	-	-	-

=== February ===
February
- Strongest: 6.6 M_{w} Papua New Guinea
- Deadliest: 6.5 M_{w} (Turkey) Turkey; 46 deaths
- Total fatalities: 47

Number by magnitude
- 9.0+: 0
- 8.0–8.9: 0
- 7.0–7.9: 0
- 6.0–6.9: 4
- 5.0–5.9: 83
- 4.0–4.9: 623

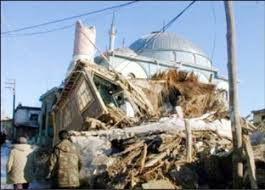
A collapsed building and a damaged mosque after the earthquake in Turkey

Date	Country and location	M_{w}	Depth (km)	MMI	Notes	Casualties	
Date	Country and location	M_{w}	Depth (km)	MMI	Notes	Dead	Injured
3	Turkey, Afyonkarahisar, 5 km (3.1 mi) NE of Sultandağı	6.5	5.0	IX	Further information: 2002 Afyon earthquake	46	332
3	Turkey, Afyonkarahisar, 11 km (6.8 mi) WNW of Çay	6.0	10.0	VIII	Aftershock of the 2002 Afyon earthquake	-	-
3	Tajikistan, Districts under Central Government Jurisdiction, 4 km (2.5 mi) ESE of Roghun	4.9	43.8	VI	Several people injured and several buildings damaged in the Roghun area.	-	Several
5	Papua New Guinea, West New Britain, 125 km (78 mi) E of Kimbe	6.6	39.0	VIII	-	-	-
15	Chile, Easter Island offshore	6.0	10.0	-	-	-	-
17	Iran, Bushehr, 115 km (71 mi) SW of Fīrūzābād	5.4	33.0	VII	One person killed, 30 injured and 80% of homes damaged at Baghan.	1	30
19	Papua New Guinea, New Ireland offshore, 129 km (80 mi) S of Kavieng	6.1	10.0	V	-	-	-
20	Poland, Lower Silesia, 6 km (3.7 mi) N of Polkowice	4.9	1.0	VII	Three people injured, equipment damaged and several tunnels collapsed at the Rudna mine. Several buildings damaged in Polkowice.	-	3
5	Papua New Guinea, East New Britain, 125 km (78 mi) E of Kimbe	6.3	40.2	VIII	-	-	-

=== March ===
March
- Strongest: 7.5 M_{w} Philippines
- Deadliest: 6.1 M_{w} (Afghanistan) Afghanistan; 2,000 deaths
- Total fatalities: 2,189

Number by magnitude
- 9.0+: 0
- 8.0–8.9: 0
- 7.0–7.9: 3
- 6.0–6.9: 8
- 5.0–5.9: 95
- 4.0–4.9: 801

Date	Country and location	M_{w}	Depth (km)	MMI	Notes	Casualties	
Date	Country and location	M_{w}	Depth (km)	MMI	Notes	Dead	Injured
3	Afghanistan, Badakhshan, 54 km (34 mi) ESE of Farkhār	6.3	209.0	V	Foreshock of the 2002 Hindu Kush earthquake.	-	-
3	Afghanistan, Badakhshan, 51 km (32 mi) SW of Jurm	7.4	225.6	VI	Further information: 2002 Hindu Kush earthquakes	169	58
5	Philippines, Soccsksargen offshore, 15 km (9.3 mi) SW of Malisbeng	7.5	31.0	IX	Further information: 2002 Mindanao earthquake	15	100
8	Philippines, Soccsksargen offshore, 28 km (17 mi) SSW of Maguling	6.0	23.3	V	Aftershock of the 2002 Mindanao earthquake.	-	-
9	South Georgia and the South Sandwich Islands, South Sandwich Islands offshore	6.0	118.4	-	-	-	-
17	South Africa, Prince Edward Islands offshore	6.0	10.0	-	-	-	-
19	Indonesia, Banda Sea offshore	6.1	148.1	-	-	-	-
25	Afghanistan, Baghlan, 16 km (9.9 mi) E of Nahrin	6.1	8.0	VII	Further information: 2002 Hindu Kush earthquakes	2,000	5,000
26	Japan, Okinawa offshore, 110 km (68 mi) S of Ishigaki	6.4	33.0	VI	-	-	-
28	Chile, Antofagasta, 107 km (66 mi) NE of Calama	6.5	125.1	V	Landslides blocked roads and power outages occurred in Pica.	-	-
31	Taiwan, Yilan offshore, 67 km (42 mi) ENE of Hualien City	7.1	32.8	VIII	Further information: 2002 Taiwan earthquake	5	213

=== April ===
April
- Strongest: 7.1 M_{w} Guam
- Deadliest: 5.9 M_{w} (Afghanistan) Afghanistan; 50 deaths
- Total fatalities: 97

Number by magnitude
- 9.0+: 0
- 8.0–8.9: 0
- 7.0–7.9: 1
- 6.0–6.9: 8
- 5.0–5.9: 84
- 4.0–4.9: 697

Date	Country and location	M_{w}	Depth (km)	MMI	Notes	Casualties	
Date	Country and location	M_{w}	Depth (km)	MMI	Notes	Dead	Injured
1	Papua New Guinea, Morobe, 62 km (39 mi) NW of Finschhafen	5.3	80.5	IV	Further information: 2002 Morobe earthquake and landslide	36	11
1	Chile, Coquimbo, 29 km (18 mi) NNW of La Serena	6.4	71.0	VI	Landslides and minor damage in the epicentral area.	-	-
7	Australia, Macquarie Island offshore	6.2	10.0	-	-	-	-
8	Western Indian-Antarctic Ridge	6.2	10.0	-	-	-	-
11	Vanuatu, Torba offshore, 58 km (36 mi) SSE of Sola	6.2	10.0	VIII	-	-	-
12	Afghanistan, Baghlan, 28 km (17 mi) ESE of Nahrin	5.9	10.0	VII	Further information: 2002 Hindu Kush earthquakes	50	150
18	Mexico, Guerrero offshore, 27 km (17 mi) SSW of Nuxco	6.8	24.9	VIII	Two buildings damaged in Mexico City.	-	-
18	Chile, Atacama, 31 km (19 mi) SW of Copiapó	6.7	62.0	VII	Nineteen people injured, 2,424 homeless, 34 homes destroyed, 575 others damaged, rockslides blocked roads, power outages and water lines broken in the Copiapó-Chañaral area.	-	19
20	Fiji region offshore	6.0	33.0	-	-	-	-
20	United States, New York, 8 km (5.0 mi) NNW of Au Sable Forks	5.3	4.8	VII	Further information: 2002 Au Sable Forks earthquake	-	-
22	Peru, Lima, 15 km (9.3 mi) N of Calango	4.4	66.6	IV	One girl died of a heart attack in Lima.	1	-
24	Kosovo, Gjilan, 2 km (1.2 mi) S of Gjilan	5.7	10.0	VII	Further information: 2002 Kosovo earthquake	1	100
24	Southern East Pacific Rise	6.2	10.0	-	-	-	-
24	Iran, Kermanshah, 23 km (14 mi) SW of Sonqor	5.4	33.0	VIII	Two people killed, 56 injured, 10 villages destroyed and 50 others damaged in Kermanshah Province.	2	56
25	Georgia, Kvemo Kartli, 3 km (1.9 mi) N of Didi Lilo	4.8	10.0	VI	Further information: 2002 Tbilisi earthquake	7	70
26	Guam offshore, 20 km (12 mi) SSW of Merizo Village	7.1	85.7	VIII	Five people injured, minor damage to buildings, water and sewer lines broke and power outages occurred in Guam.	-	5

=== May ===
May
- Strongest: 6.4 M_{w} United States
- Deadliest: 5.5 M_{w} Tanzania; 2 deaths
- Total fatalities: 3

Number by magnitude
- 9.0+: 0
- 8.0–8.9: 0
- 7.0–7.9: 0
- 6.0–6.9: 7
- 5.0–5.9: 85
- 4.0–4.9: 590

Date	Country and location	M_{w}	Depth (km)	MMI	Notes	Casualties	
Date	Country and location	M_{w}	Depth (km)	MMI	Notes	Dead	Injured
8	Tonga, Vava‘u offshore, 99 km (62 mi) NW of Neiafu	6.2	130.8	-	-	-	-
14	Mid-Indian Ridge	6.2	10.0	-	-	-	-
15	Taiwan, Yilan offshore, 21 km (13 mi) SE of Yilan	6.2	10.0	IX	One person killed, another injured and two homes damaged in Dongshan.	1	1
18	Tanzania, Shinyanga, 25 km (16 mi) ENE of Malya	5.5	10.0	VIII	Two people killed, 400 families displaced, 690 huts collapsed and 700 more damaged in Bunda District.	2	-
23	Chile, Coquimbo, 16 km (9.9 mi) S of Ovalle	6.0	52.1	VII	Some homes damaged in San Julián and power outages in the Hurtado-La Serena-Monte Patria-Punitaqui area.	-	-
24	Romania, Caraș-Severin, 2 km (1.2 mi) ESE of Pojejena	4.7	10.0	VI	Five people slightly injured and some buildings damaged in the epicentral area.	-	5
25	United States, Alaska offshore, 159 km (99 mi) SSE of King Cove	6.4	33.0	-	-	-	-
28	Argentina, La Rioja, 39 km (24 mi) S of Arauco	6.0	22.2	VIII	Twenty-seven people injured and 40 homes destroyed in the Aminga-Anillaco-Agua Blanca-Chuquis area. About 50% of homes damaged in Castro Barros Department. Landslides occurred in the epicentral area.	-	27
28	Taiwan, Hualien offshore, 67 km (42 mi) E of Hualien City	6.1	33.0	VI	-	-	-

=== June ===
June
- Strongest: 7.3 M_{w} China
- Deadliest: 6.5 M_{w} Iran; 261 deaths
- Total fatalities: 261

Number by magnitude
- 9.0+: 0
- 8.0–8.9: 0
- 7.0–7.9: 1
- 6.0–6.9: 13
- 5.0–5.9: 99
- 4.0–4.9: 697

Date	Country and location	M_{w}	Depth (km)	MMI	Notes	Casualties		
Date	Country and location	M_{w}	Depth (km)	MMI	Notes	Dead	Injured	
6	Papua New Guinea, New Ireland offshore, 173 km (107 mi) NE of Lorengau	6.3	10.0	-	-	-	-	
10	Micronesia, Yap offshore, 136 km (85 mi) N of Fais	6.1	33.0	-	-	-	-	
13	Southeast Indian Ridge	6.6	10.0	-	-	-	-	
14	Japan, Ibaraki, 9 km (5.6 mi) SSW of Yuki	4.9	51.7	VI	One person injured in Toride. Bullet train service was interrupted on several lines.	-	1	
16	Costa Rica, Puntarenas offshore, 55 km (34 mi) WSW of Ciudad Cortés	6.4	35.0	VII	-	-	-	
17	Central East Pacific Rise	6.0	10.0	-	-	-	-	
17	Vanuatu, Torba, 190 km (120 mi) NW of Sola	6.7	33.0	VII	-	-	-	
18	Chile, Coquimbo, 20 km (12 mi) SW of Monte Patria	6.6	54.0	VII	Two homes destroyed in Illapel and another in Monte Patria. Several schools slightly damaged in Limarí Province.	-	-	
20	Bangladesh, Rangpur, 8 km (5.0 mi) NNE of Saidpur	4.5	39.8	V	Fifty people injured and damage in Rangpur, five people injured in Thakurgaon and some buildings damaged in Alamnagar.	-	55	
21	Papua New Guinea, Madang offshore, 135 km (84 mi) NE of Madang	6.0	33.0	-	-	-	-	
22	Iran, Qazvin, 59 km (37 mi) SSW of Abhar	6.5	10.0	VIII	Further information: 2002 Bou'in-Zahra earthquake	261	1,500	
24	Tunisia, Kairouan, 15 km (9.3 mi) SW of Sbikha	5.2	10.0	VII	Twelve people injured and some homes collapsed in Kairouan.	-	12	
22	Iran, Hamadan, 71 km (44 mi) E of Qohūrd-e ‘Olyā	4.6	10.0	VI	Aftershock of the 2002 Bou'in-Zahra earthquake. Two people injured in Razan.	-	2	
27	Indonesia, Banten offshore, 193 km (120 mi) WSW of Labuan	6.5	11.0	V	-	-	-	
27	Vanuatu, Torba, 85 km (53 mi) NW of Sola	6.0	186.7	-	-	-	-	
28	China, Heilongjiang, 50 km (31 mi) SW of Dongning	7.3	566.0	I	-	-	-	
29	Vanuatu, Torba, 197 km (122 mi) NW of Sola	6.2	33.0	-	Aftershock of the 6.7 event on June 17.	-	-	-
30	South of the Fiji Islands	6.5	620.4	-	-	-	-	

=== July ===
July
- Strongest: 6.5 M_{w} Panama
- Total fatalities: 0

Number by magnitude
- 9.0+: 0
- 8.0–8.9: 0
- 7.0–7.9: 0
- 6.0–6.9: 4
- 5.0–5.9: 75
- 4.0–4.9: 592

Date	Country and location	M_{w}	Depth (km)	MMI	Notes	Casualties	
Date	Country and location	M_{w}	Depth (km)	MMI	Notes	Dead	Injured
3	Papua New Guinea, Madang offshore, 173 km (107 mi) E of Madang	6.2	31.2	VI	-	-	-
13	Pakistan, Balochistan, 65 km (40 mi) W of Taunsa	5.8	33.0	VIII	Landslides blocked roads in the epicentral area.	-	-
19	Pacific–Antarctic Ridge	6.1	10.0	-	-	-	-
30	South Georgia and the South Sandwich Islands, South Sandwich Islands offshore	6.2	33.0	-	-	-	-
31	Panama, Chiriquí offshore, 14 km (8.7 mi) SE of Punta de Burica	6.5	10.0	VIII	Eleven people injured, some homes collapsed and many buildings damaged in Barú District, Chiriquí. Buildings damaged in Alanje and David. One wharf damaged in Puerto Armuelles. Eight people injured, six homes collapsed and dozens more damaged in the Laurel-Neily area, Costa Rica.	-	19

=== August ===
August
- Strongest: 7.7 M_{w} Fiji; Two events
- Deadliest: 6.2 M_{w} Indonesia; 1 death
- Total fatalities: 1

Number by magnitude
- 9.0+: 0
- 8.0–8.9: 0
- 7.0–7.9: 2
- 6.0–6.9: 11
- 5.0–5.9: 94
- 4.0–4.9: 656

Date	Country and location	M_{w}	Depth (km)	MMI	Notes	Casualties	
Date	Country and location	M_{w}	Depth (km)	MMI	Notes	Dead	Injured
2	Japan, Izu Islands offshore	6.3	426.1	I	-	-	-
4	Southern Mid-Atlantic Ridge	6.0	10.0	-	-	-	-
7	Panama, Chiriquí offshore, 20 km (12 mi) S of Punta de Burica	6.0	10.0	VI	Aftershock of the 6.5 event on July 31.	-	-
8	China, Sichuan, 219 km (136 mi) WNW of Kangding	5.3	33.0	V	Eight homes destroyed and 66 damaged in Rulong.	-	-
9	Tonga, Niua offshore, 257 km (160 mi) W of Hihifo	6.1	364.1	-	-	-	-
12	Vanuatu, Tafea offshore, 26 km (16 mi) W of Isangel	6.0	112.2	-	-	-	-
14	Micronesia, Ngulu offshore, 231 km (144 mi) SW of Colonia	6.3	10.0	-	-	-	-
14	Northern Mariana Islands, Rota offshore, 114 km (71 mi) SSE of San Jose Village	6.5	30.0	V	Minor damage to some buildings in Saipan.	-	-
15	Indonesia, Central Sulawesi, 68 km (42 mi) ENE of Poso	6.2	10.0	IX	One person killed, 48 others injured, 138 homes destroyed and 509 others damaged in Tojo Una-Una Regency.	1	48
19	Fiji, Eastern offshore, 421 km (262 mi) SSE of Levuka	7.7	580.0	I	An example of a doublet earthquake.	-	-
19	Fiji, Eastern offshore, 639 km (397 mi) S of Suva	7.7	675.4	I	An example of a doublet earthquake.	-	-
19	South of the Fiji Islands	6.1	677.4	-	Aftershock of the 7.7 events.	-	-
20	Japan, Izu Islands offshore	6.3	9.0	-	-	-	-
24	Russia, Sakhalin offshore, 50 km (31 mi) SSE of Nemuro, Japan	6.1	42.6	VII	-	-	-

=== September ===
September
- Strongest: 7.6 M_{w} Papua New Guinea
- Deadliest: 7.6 M_{w} Papua New Guinea; 6 deaths
- Total fatalities: 10

Number by magnitude
- 9.0+: 0
- 8.0–8.9: 0
- 7.0–7.9: 1
- 6.0–6.9: 14
- 5.0–5.9: 116
- 4.0–4.9: 750

Date	Country and location	M_{w}	Depth (km)	MMI	Notes	Casualties	
Date	Country and location	M_{w}	Depth (km)	MMI	Notes	Dead	Injured
1	Yemen, Al Mahrah offshore, 214 km (133 mi) S of Al Ghayz̧ah	6.0	10.0	-	-	-	-
6	Italy, Sicily offshore, 34 km (21 mi) NNE of Santa Flavia	6.0	5.0	VI	Two people died from heart attacks, 20 injured and several buildings damaged in Palermo.	2	20
7	Tonga, Tongatapu offshore, 129 km (80 mi) NW of Nukuʻalofa	6.0	209.9	-	-	-	-
8	South of the Fiji Islands	6.0	618.8	-	-	-	-
8	Papua New Guinea, Sandaun offshore, 68 km (42 mi) ESE of Aitape	7.6	13.0	X	Further information: 2002 Sandaun earthquake	6	70
13	India, Andaman and Nicobar Islands offshore, 152 km (94 mi) NNE of Bamboo Flat	6.5	21.0	IX	Two people killed in Rangat and 40 houses destroyed on Middle Andaman Island. Several buildings damaged in Diglipur. A local tsunami damaged several shops in the Aerial Bay Islands and a lighthouse on East Island.	2	-
15	China, Heilongjiang, 21 km (13 mi) ENE of Chaihe	6.4	586.3	I	-	-	-
16	Papua New Guinea, Sandaun, 41 km (25 mi) ESE of Aitape	6.3	10.0	IX	Aftershocks of the 2002 Sandaun earthquake.	-	-
17	Papua New Guinea, Sandaun offshore, 49 km (30 mi) ESE of Aitape	6.0	10.0	VIII	Aftershocks of the 2002 Sandaun earthquake.	-	-
20	Indonesia, West Papua, 97 km (60 mi) S of Manokwari	6.0	10.0	VIII	Foreshocks of the 2002 West Papua earthquake. At least 31 homes damaged in Ransiki.	-	-
20	Indonesia, West Papua offshore, 92 km (57 mi) SSE of Manokwari	6.4	10.0	VIII	Foreshocks of the 2002 West Papua earthquake. At least 31 homes damaged in Ransiki.	-	-
22	United Kingdom, England, 2 km (1.2 mi) ESE of Wombourn	4.8	9.4	VI	One person injured in Mansfield. One chimney collapsed and other minor damage in the Dudley area. Items knocked from shelves and utilities disrupted over a wide area in the West Midlands.	-	1
24	Argentina, San Juan, 29 km (18 mi) SE of Calingasta	6.3	119.6	V	One building damaged in Mendoza.	-	-
24	Solomon Islands, Makira-Ulawa offshore, 79 km (49 mi) W of Kirakira	6.1	10.0	VIII	Foreshock of the 6.3 events later that day.	-	-
24	Solomon Islands, Makira-Ulawa offshore, 89 km (55 mi) W of Kirakira	6.3	10.0	VII	An example of a doublet earthquake.	-	-
24	Solomon Islands, Makira-Ulawa offshore, 80 km (50 mi) WSW of Kirakira	6.3	19.0	VII	An example of a doublet earthquake.	-	-
25	Mexico, Guerrero offshore, 8 km (5.0 mi) SSW of Los Mogotes	5.3	5.5	VII	Two people injured and some buildings damaged in Acapulco.	-	2
25	Iran, Khuzestan, 6 km (3.7 mi) NNE of Masjed Soleymān	5.6	10.0	VIII	Five people injured, 30 livestock killed and 30% of homes damaged across several villages in the Masjed Soleyman area.	-	5

=== October ===
October
- Strongest: 7.6 M_{w} Indonesia
- Deadliest: 5.9 M_{w} Italy; 29 deaths
- Total fatalities: 39

Number by magnitude
- 9.0+: 0
- 8.0–8.9: 0
- 7.0–7.9: 1
- 6.0–6.9: 23
- 5.0–5.9: 116
- 4.0–4.9: 822

Date	Country and location	M_{w}	Depth (km)	MMI	Notes	Casualties	
Date	Country and location	M_{w}	Depth (km)	MMI	Notes	Dead	Injured
3	Mexico, Baja California Sur offshore, 111 km (69 mi) ESE of La Rivera	6.5	10.0	VI	-	-	-
3	Indonesia, East Java offshore, 90 km (56 mi) NE of Singaraja	6.0	315.8	IV	-	-	-
4	Fiji region offshore	6.3	621.1	-	-	-	-
6	Indonesia, West Nusa Tenggara offshore, 38 km (24 mi) NNW of Dompu	6.3	10.0	IX	-	-	-
8	Southeast Indian Ridge	6.0	10.0	-	-	-	-
10	Indonesia, West Papua offshore, 102 km (63 mi) SSE of Manokwari	7.6	10.0	X	Further information: 2002 West Papua earthquake	8	632
10	Indonesia, West Papua, 72 km (45 mi) S of Manokwari	6.7	10.0	VIII	Aftershocks of the 2002 West Papua earthquake.	-	-
10	Indonesia, West Papua, 61 km (38 mi) SSW of Manokwari	6.0	10.0	VIII	Aftershocks of the 2002 West Papua earthquake.	-	-
10	Indonesia, West Papua, 68 km (42 mi) S of Manokwari	6.0	10.0	VII	Aftershocks of the 2002 West Papua earthquake.	-	-
12	Brazil, Acre, 108 km (67 mi) W of Tarauacá	6.9	534.3	IV	-	-	-
12	Philippines, Central Luzon offshore, 155 km (96 mi) WSW of Palauig	6.1	33.0	II	-	-	-
13	Tonga, Niua offshore, 166 km (103 mi) SSE of Mata Utu, Wallis and Futuna	6.1	10.0	-	-	-	-
14	Japan, Aomori offshore, 87 km (54 mi) E of Mutsu	6.1	61.4	VI	-	-	-
16	Russia, Kamchatka Krai, 76 km (47 mi) NE of Ozernovskiy	6.2	102.4	VI	-	-	-
16	Tonga, Niua offshore, 85 km (53 mi) ENE of Hihifo	6.0	33.0	-	-	-	-
17	Fiji region offshore	6.2	627.6	-	-	-	-
17	Indonesia, Papua, 119 km (74 mi) SSW of Abepura	6.3	33.0	VIII	-	-	-
18	Pacific–Antarctic Ridge	6.1	10.0	-	-	-	-
19	Indonesia, Papua, 123 km (76 mi) SSW of Abepura	6.0	33.0	VIII	Aftershock of the 6.3 event on October 17.	-	-
19	Russia, Sakhalin offshore, 194 km (121 mi) ESE of Kuril’sk	6.3	33.0	-	-	-	-
22	Fiji region offshore	6.2	549.0	-	-	-	-
23	United States, Alaska, 53 km (33 mi) ENE of Cantwell	6.6	4.2	VIII	Foreshock of the 2002 Denali earthquake. Damage in Cantwell, rockfalls and snow avalanches observed in the epicentral area, and ground cracks observed in the Denali Highway roadbed.	-	-
24	Democratic Republic of the Congo, South Kivu, 34 km (21 mi) SW of Goma	6.2	11.0	IX	Further information: 2002 Kalehe earthquake	2	-
29	Italy, Sicily offshore, 7 km (4.3 mi) ESE of Carruba	4.3	10.0	VIII	Nine people injured and dozens of buildings damaged in the Santa Venerina area.	-	9
31	Papua New Guinea, Manus offshore, 217 km (135 mi) SE of Lorengau	6.1	10.0	-	-	-	-
31	Italy, Molise, 4 km (2.5 mi) WSW of Larino	5.9	10.0	VIII	Further information: 2002 Molise earthquakes	29	135

=== November ===
November
- Strongest: 7.9 M_{w} United States
- Deadliest: 6.3 M_{w} (Pakistan) Pakistan; 23 deaths
- Total fatalities: 44

Number by magnitude
- 9.0+: 0
- 8.0–8.9: 0
- 7.0–7.9: 3
- 6.0–6.9: 8
- 5.0–5.9: 122
- 4.0–4.9: 921

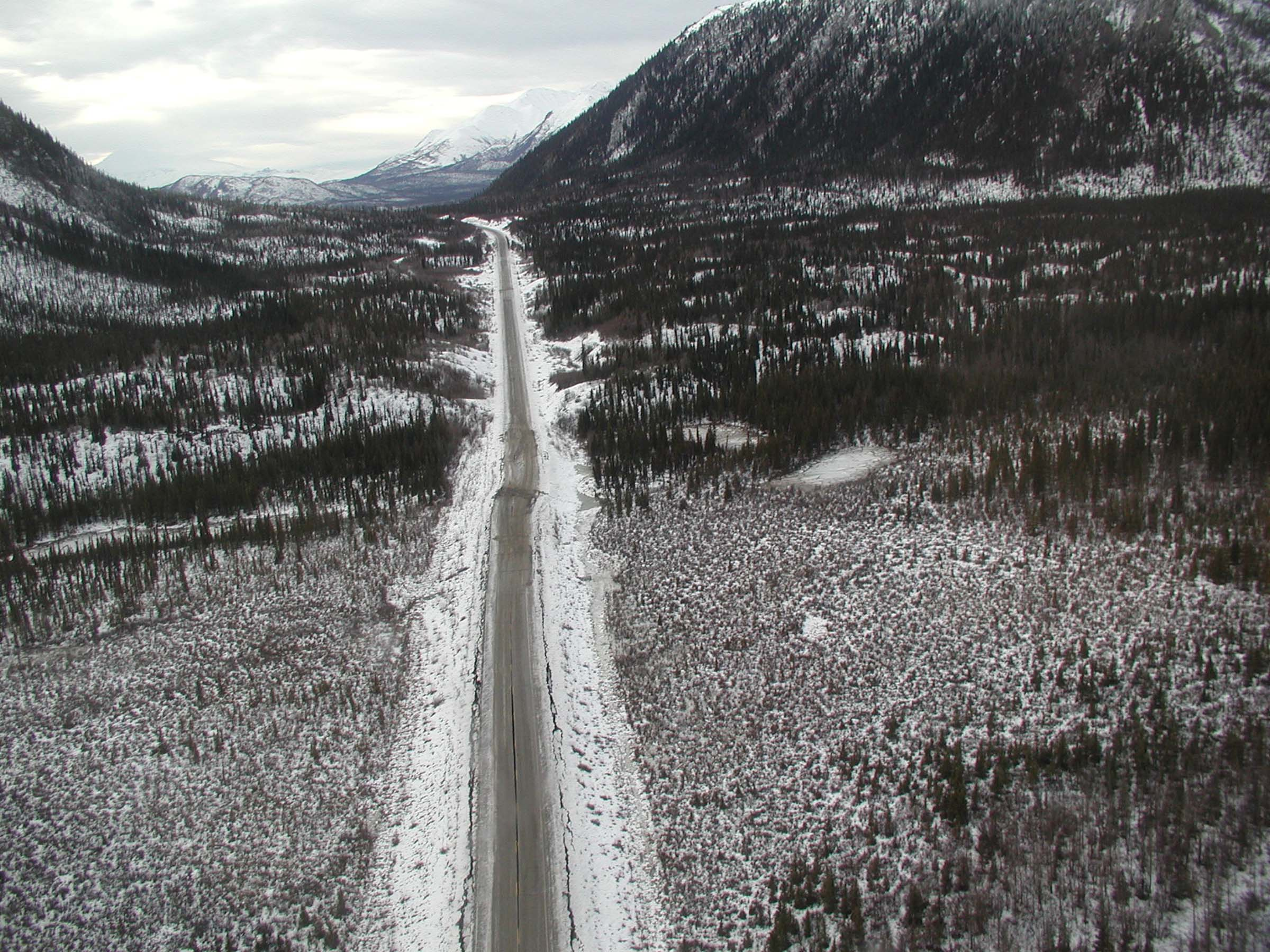
The Tok Cut-Off was offset 23 feet (7 m) by the earthquake in Alaska

Date	Country and location	M_{w}	Depth (km)	MMI	Notes	Casualties							
Date	Country and location	M_{w}	Depth (km)	MMI	Notes	1	Italy, Molise, 2 km (1.2 mi) ESE of Casacalenda	5.8	10.0	VIII	Further information: 2002 Molise earthquakes	-	3
1	Pakistan, Gilgit-Baltistan, 54 km (34 mi) SE of Gilgit	5.4	33.0	VII	Further information: 2002 Gilgit-Baltistan earthquakes	17	65						
2	Pakistan, Gilgit-Baltistan, 54 km (34 mi) SE of Gilgit	5.2	33.0	-	Aftershock of the 2002 Gilgit-Baltistan earthquakes. One person killed and three others injured by a landslide on the Karakoram Highway.	1	3						
2	Indonesia, Aceh offshore, 50 km (31 mi) NW of Sinabang	7.4	30.0	VIII	Further information: 2002 Sumatra earthquake	3	65						
2	Indonesia, Aceh offshore, 52 km (32 mi) N of Sinabang	6.3	27.0	VII	Aftershock of the 2002 Sumatra earthquake.	-	-						
3	Japan, Iwate offshore, 30 km (19 mi) SE of Ōfunato	6.4	39.0	VI	-	-	-						
3	United States, Alaska, 75 km (47 mi) E of Cantwell	7.9	4.2	IX	Further information: 2002 Denali earthquake	-	1						
7	United States, Alaska offshore, 289 km (180 mi) WSW of Adak	6.6	33.0	-	-	-	-						
9	Guatemala, Escuintla offshore, 40 km (25 mi) SSW of La Gomera	6.0	33.0	VI	-	-	-						
12	South Georgia and the South Sandwich Islands, South Sandwich Islands offshore	6.2	120.0	-	-	-	-						
12	South Georgia and the South Sandwich Islands, South Georgia offshore	6.6	10.0	-	-	-	-						
17	Russia, Sakhalin offshore, 262 km (163 mi) E of Dolinsk	7.3	459.1	III	-	-	-						
20	Pakistan, Gilgit-Baltistan, 58 km (36 mi) SSE of Gilgit	6.3	33.0	IX	Further information: 2002 Gilgit-Baltistan earthquakes	23	100						
26	United States, Alaska offshore, 93 km (58 mi) SSE of Atka	6.1	20.6	IV	-	-	-						
27	Vanuatu, Torba offshore, 74 km (46 mi) SSE of Sola	5.9	33.0	VIII	Three people injured, 100 buildings damaged, several water lines affected and landslides blocked many roads on Merelava.	-	3						

=== December ===
December
- Strongest: 6.7 M_{w} Papua New Guinea
- Deadliest: 5.6 M_{w} China; 2 deaths
- Total fatalities: 2

Number by magnitude
- 9.0+: 0
- 8.0–8.9: 0
- 7.0–7.9: 0
- 6.0–6.9: 9
- 5.0–5.9: 93
- 4.0–4.9: 643

Date	Country and location	M_{w}	Depth (km)	MMI	Notes	Casualties							
Date	Country and location	M_{w}	Depth (km)	MMI	Notes	2	Greece, Ionian Islands offshore, 11 km (6.8 mi) S of Arkoúdi	5.7	10.0	VII	Seventeen people injured when a rockslide near Megalopolis caused a train to derail. Eight homes destroyed and 100 damaged in the Vartholomio area.	-	17
10	Southern East Pacific Rise	6.0	10.0	-	-	-	-						
10	South of the Fiji Islands	6.1	530.6	-	-	-	-						
11	Indonesia, Papua, 65 km (40 mi) SSW of Nabire	6.3	10.0	IX	Foreshock of the February 2004 Nabire earthquakes.	-	-						
12	Papua New Guinea, New Ireland offshore, 122 km (76 mi) ESE of Kokopo	6.7	34.0	VII	-	-	-						
14	China, Gansu, 27 km (17 mi) WSW of Laojunmiao	5.6	22.0	VIII	Two people killed, 13,380 houses, five highways and three bridges damaged in Yumen City.	2	-						
17	South Georgia and the South Sandwich Islands, South Sandwich Islands offshore	6.2	10.0	-	An example of a doublet earthquake.	-	-						
18	South Georgia and the South Sandwich Islands, South Sandwich Islands offshore	6.1	10.0	-	An example of a doublet earthquake.	-	-						
20	Papua New Guinea, Manus offshore, 137 km (85 mi) SSE of Lorengau	6.3	10.0	V	-	-	-						
23	Honduras, Bay Islands offshore, 63 km (39 mi) NNE of Savannah Bight	6.0	33.0	VI	-	-	-						
24	Iran, Kermanshah, 24 km (15 mi) SSW of Sonqor	5.2	33.0	V	Fifteen people injured and 3,000 homes previously damaged by the 5.4 event on April 24 collapsed in Kermanshah Province.	0	15						
25	China, Xinjiang, 64 km (40 mi) W of Kashgar	5.7	10.0	VIII	Several homes destroyed, some buildings damaged and a landslide blocked a highway in Ulugqat County.	-	-						
25	Afghanistan, Baghlan, 53 km (33 mi) NE of Bazarak	5.5	90.8	IV	Dozens of buildings slightly damaged in Jalalabad.	-	-						
30	Philippines, Zamboanga Peninsula offshore, Tabina	6.3	10.0	IX	-	-	-						

== See also ==
- Lists of 21st-century earthquakes
- List of earthquakes 2001–2010
- Lists of earthquakes by year
- Lists of earthquakes
