= 2002 Hindu Kush earthquakes =

Earthquakes in northern Afghanistan

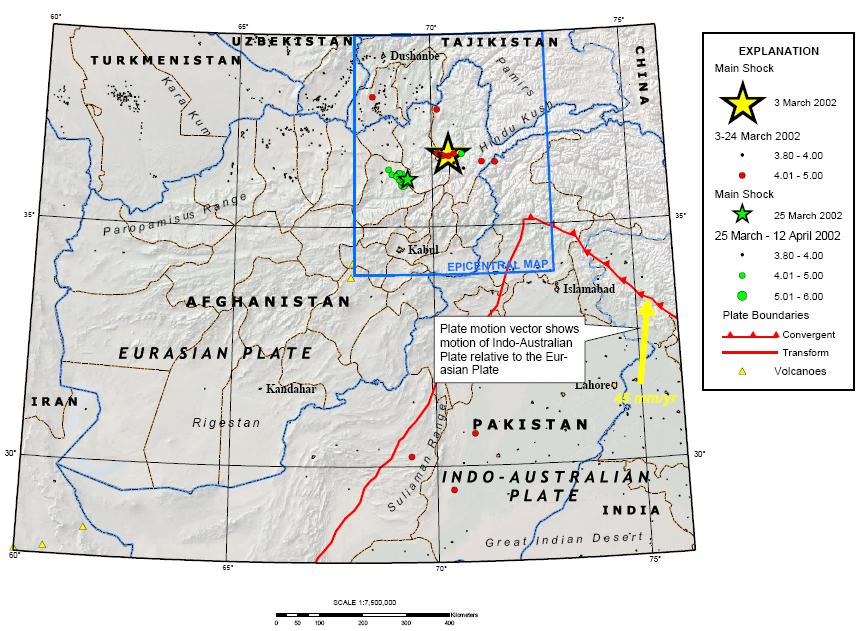

- Location within Afghanistan
- UTC time: 2002-03-03 12:08:19; 2002-03-25 14:56:33
- ISC event: 5267309; 2947182
- USGS-ANSS: ComCat; ComCat
- Local date: March 3, 2002; March 25, 2002
- Local time: 16:38:19 AFT (UTC+4:30); 19:26:33 AFT (UTC+4:30)
- Magnitude: M_{w} 7.4; M_{w} 6.1
- Depth: 225.6 km (140 mi) (March 3) 8 km (5 mi) (March 25)
- Epicenter: 36.502°N 70.482°E; 36.062°N 69.315°E
- Type: Dip-slip
- Areas affected: Afghanistan; Northern Pakistan, Tajikistan and Western China (March 3)
- Max. intensity: MMI VII (Very strong)
- Foreshocks: M_{w} 6.3 on March 3
- Casualties: 1,419–2,219 fatalities, 5,209 injuries, 62–65 missing: 169 fatalities, 58 injuries, 50 missing (March 3); 1,200–2,000 fatalities, 5,000 injuries (March 25); 50 fatalities, 150 injuries, 12–15 missing (April 12); 1 injured (other events)

The 2002 Hindu Kush earthquakes struck northern Afghanistan, with the two most destructive events occurring in March. At least 169 people were killed during a very large and intermediate-depth M_{w} 7.4 event on March 3. Three weeks later, at least 1,200 were killed during a moderate but shallow M_{w} 6.1 event that had a maximum Mercalli intensity of VII (Very strong). A M_{w} 5.9 aftershock on April 12, which had a Mercalli intensity of VII (Very strong), killed an additional 50 people. The M_{w} 7.4 and M_{w} 6.1 reverse events were focused in the Hindu Kush mountain range area.

== Tectonic setting ==
Northern Afghanistan lies within the broad zone of continuing collision between the Indian plate and the Eurasian plate. The area is seismically active, particularly as a result of faulting at just over 200 km depth within the descending slab. Many large events of M ≥ 7 have been observed in the Hindu Kush, all with similar epicenters, with an approximate periodicity of about 10–15 years. These events have reverse fault focal mechanisms, which for the near-vertical slab indicates active extension. It has been proposed that these earthquakes are a result of "necking" of the downgoing slab, a process that may eventually lead to break-off.

Smaller shallow focus earthquakes are also observed in the region, particularly associated with north–south trending zones of right lateral strike-slip, such as the Chaman Fault, with an increasing degree of shortening to the north, together accommodating the highly oblique convergence between the Indian plate and the Eurasian plate.

== Earthquakes ==
On January 3, at 07:05 UTC, a M_{w} 6.2 earthquake struck with a hypocenter 129.3 km (80.3 mi) beneath the surface struck with an epicenter 77 km (48 mi) north-northwest of Parun, with a maximum Modified Mercalli intensity of V (Moderate) in the cities of Dushanbe and Khorog in Tajikistan; tremors from this earthquake were felt as far away as Tashkent in Uzbekistan, Multan in Pakistan and Northwest India. On March 3, mb 6.3 foreshock occurred at 12:08 UTC. The mainshock struck 12 seconds later and had a magnitude of M_{w} 7.4, with a hypocentral depth of 225.6 km (140.2 mi) and a Mercalli intensity of VI (Strong). The focal mechanism is consistent with reverse faulting within subducting oceanic crust. Comparison with similar earthquakes in 1993 and 2015, which have very similar depths and epicenters, suggests that the major component of the slip in all three events occurred on the same part of the fault.

The March 25 event had a magnitude of M_{w} 6.1, with a hypocentral depth of 8 km (5.0 mi). It had a reverse fault mechanism that occurred on one of two possible moderately-dipping north–south trending faults. It was followed by a series of aftershocks which lasted for weeks, including a M_{w} 5.6 event on March 27, and another measuring M_{w} 5.9 on April 12; both events had an estimated Mercalli intensity of VII (Very strong).

== Damage and casualties ==
=== March 3 event ===
At least 150 people and 500 livestock were killed, 50 people were missing and another 15 were injured during a landslide that dammed and flooded the Surkundara Valley in Samangan Province. The landslide, which was a result of a 200 m (660 ft) high mountain cliff collapsing and covering an area of 30,000 m^{3} (1,100,000 ft^{3}) with debris, buried an estimated 200 people and destroyed 100 homes, hundreds of jeribs of farmland and 4 km (2.5 mi) of road, with the landslide damaging 300 additional houses.

In the Kabul-Rustaq area, 13 people died; 20 others were injured, 38 homes were destroyed and 100 more suffered damage in eastern areas of Kabul. Minor damage was also reported in surrounding areas, while several homes reportedly collapsed in Gulbahar. The earthquake also killed two people and destroyed 340 homes at the village of Khustak in Jurm District, while Baharak District recorded one death and 47 damaged households. Fifty homes also collapsed in Keshem. Eleven female students were injured, one of them critically, when a staircase at a girls' school in Jalalabad collapsed as they tried to flee the building.

A few people were injured and 470 houses, 30 schools and 30 medical facilities were damaged across Tajikistan, with 116 of the affected structures receiving severe damage; 79 homes, a school and a hospital collapsed in Jayhun District, 20 homes were destroyed and 30 others, 18 schools and 6 km (3.7 mi) of power and communication lines were damaged in Ishkoshim District, and 65 households suffered damage at Rushon District. In Dushanbe, 15 residential buildings were destroyed while many other structures, including the Ayni Opera and Ballet Theatre, Lohuti Drama Theatre and the National Library of Tajikistan building suffered minor damage. In Pakistan, three people were killed in Bajaur, while 12 others were treated for minor injuries in Peshawar. A 45 m (148 ft) wide fissure opened near Xiker Reservoir in Xinjiang, China.

=== March 25 event ===
The death toll varies greatly, with the United Nations confirming that 1,200 people had died and local Afghan authorities reporting 2,000 fatalities, initially saying that the toll could be as high as 5,000. There were also 5,000 injuries. Additionally, relief workers reported that tens-of-thousands of casualties were likely and that many villages were decimated. Over 30,000 homes collapsed, with 80% of Nahrin District's housing stock destroyed; at Nahrin's town center, nearly 100 died and 200 houses collapsed. At least 90% of homes within a 15 km (9.3 mi) radius of the town were damaged, including 25% which were destroyed completely and an additional 60% with serious damage. The high death toll and heavy damage were attributed to poor construction; most homes were constructed of mud brick.

=== Other events ===
The M_{w} 6.2 earthquake on January 3 injured one person and caused strong shaking in the Mazar-e Sharif–Kabul area. A M_{w} 5.6 aftershock on March 27 caused additional casualties, damage and landslides in the epicentral area. On April 12, another aftershock, measuring M_{w} 5.9, killed 50 people, left 12-15 others missing, injured 150, destroyed 160 homes, damaged 250 more and triggered at least one landslide. Eighty percent of those killed were children, with 40 of the fatalities occurring in the village of Dawabi, which was destroyed in the aftershock.

== Response ==
=== March 3 ===
With the use of two WFP helicopters, the United Nations (UN) and its humanitarian partners carried out aerial damage assessments in Samangan Province. The aerial emergency assessment mission left Mazar-i-Sharif International Airport on 4 March at around 14:00 local time. The United Nations Office for the Coordination of Humanitarian Affairs (UNOCHA) also coordinated pre-positioning of emergency assistance, including 30,000 blankets, 1,000 tents and 10 trucks from the International Organization for Migration (IOM), food from the World Food Programme (WFP), emergency medical assistance from the International Committee of the Red Cross (ICRC), Doctors Without Borders (MSF) and International Federation of Red Cross and Red Crescent Societies (IFRC), winter clothing from UNICEF, and other non-food items from the United Nations High Commissioner for Refugees (UNHCR).

=== March 25 ===
The Afghan Red Crescent Society (ARCS) prepared to send 23,259 blankets, 8,326 jerrycans, 7,165 tents, 4,244 tarpaulins, 3,768 cooking sets, 1,478 kitchen sets, 199 shovels and one generator to the affected region. An ARCS emergency mobile unit, equipped with medical supplies, arrived in Nahrin on March 26.

== See also ==
- List of earthquakes in 2002
- List of earthquakes in Afghanistan
- February 1998 Afghanistan earthquake
- May 1998 Afghanistan earthquake
