= 2002 Afyon earthquake =

Earthquake in Turkey

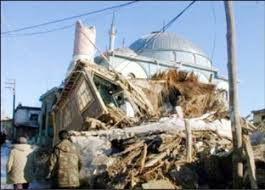
- A collapsed building and a damaged mosque in Sultandağı

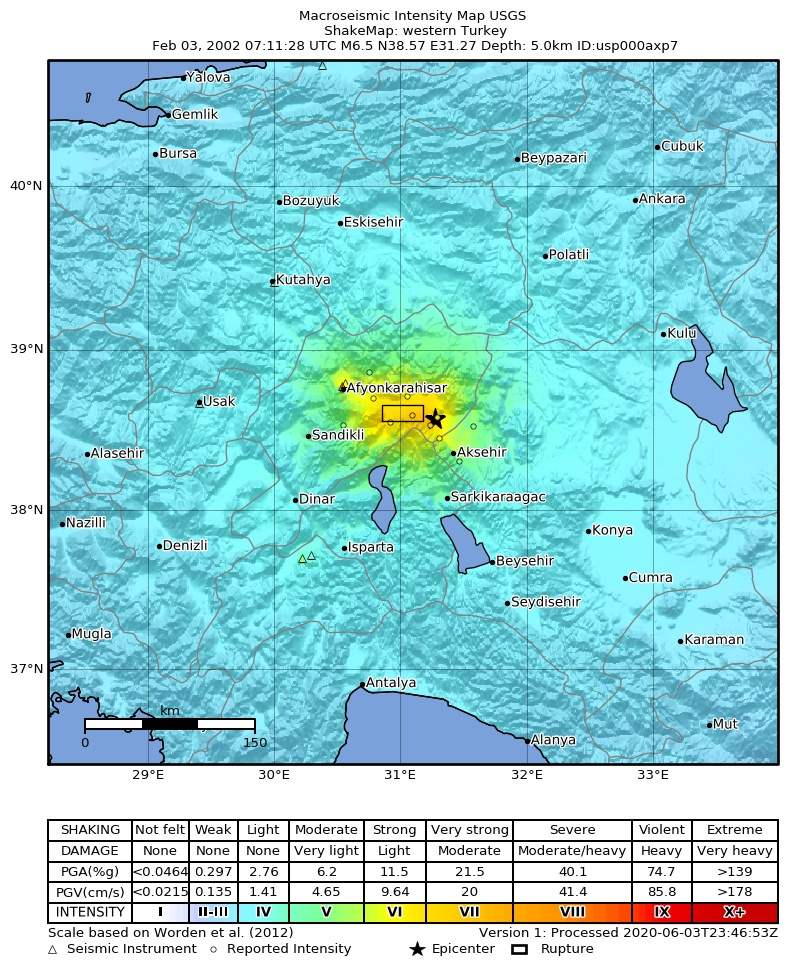
- USGS ShakeMap

- Location within Turkey
- UTC time: 2002-02-03 07:11:28
- ISC event: 2765123
- USGS-ANSS: ComCat
- Local date: 3 February 2002
- Local time: 10:11:28 TRT (UTC+3:00)
- Magnitude: M_{w} 6.2–6.7
- Depth: 5 km (3 mi)
- Epicentre: 38.573°N 31.271°E
- Fault: Sultandağı Fault
- Type: Normal
- Areas affected: Afyonkarahisar and Konya Provinces, Turkey
- Max. intensity: MMI IX (Violent)
- Peak acceleration: 0.25 g
- Peak velocity: 40.41 cm/s
- Aftershocks: 600+ total Strongest: M_{w} 5.8–6.0 at 09:26 UTC
- Casualties: 46 fatalities, 332 injuries

The Afyonkarahisar Province of western Turkey was struck by a M_{w} 6.2–6.7 earthquake on 3 February 2002 at 10:11:28 local time (07:11:28 UTC). It had a maximum felt intensity of IX (Violent) on the Modified Mercalli intensity scale. It caused the deaths of 46 people and a further 332 injuries, with 15,700 buildings affected, the vast majority of them in the communities of Eber, Çay, Afyonkarahisar and Sultandağı.

== Tectonic setting ==
Most of western Turkey lies in an area of extensional tectonics that extends into the Aegean Sea. The cause of the extension is thought to be the rollback of the subducting slab of the African plate that dips northwards beneath the Aegean. The overall N–S extension has resulted in a series of NW–SE to W–E trending seismically active normal faults with associated rift basins. The Afyon–Akşehir Graben lies in the hanging-wall of the low-angle Sultandağı Fault and contains nearly 1 km of late Miocene to Quaternary sedimentary fill. Part of this fault ruptured during a magnitude 6.0 earthquake in December 2000.

== Earthquake ==
Estimated number of people exposed to shaking levels
MMI	Population exposure
MMI IX (Violent)	14k
MMI VIII (Severe)	23k
MMI VII (Very strong)	232k
MMI VI (Strong)	501k

The earthquake had a magnitude in the range of M_{w} 6.2–6.7, with the United States Geological Survey (USGS) reporting a magnitude of M_{wc} 6.5. The observed focal mechanism is consistent with normal faulting along a fault trending WSW–ENE, although the local trend of the basin-bounding fault is closer to WNW–ESE. The distribution of the aftershocks, however, is consistent with a rupture along part of the Sultandağı Fault of about 40 km in length. It also suggests that the rupture propagation was almost unidirectional towards the northwest, with the mainshock close to the southeastern end of the rupture. According to the USGS, 30 km (19 mi) of surface faulting with vertical offset in the Çay–Sultandağı area, while two new hot springs formed in the area and others changed their flow rates.

The earthquake had a maximum Modified Mercalli intensity of IX (Violent). A USGS seismic installation at Afyonkarahisar city recorded 0.1157 g in peak ground acceleration (pga) and 40.41 cm/s (15.9 in/s) in ground velocity; the station data corresponded to MMI VIII (Severe) shaking. A Mercalli intensity of VII (Very Strong) and a pga of 0.25 g was estimated in Çay and other areas up to 20 km (12 mi) southeast of the town, based on damage to reinforced concrete buildings in the town. MMI VI (Strong) was estimated within an 80 km (50 mi) radius of the epicenter.

In total, there were more than 600 aftershocks, including 17 with a magnitude of 4.0 or higher by the end of 2002. The largest aftershock, measuring M_{w} 5.8–6.0, occurred at 09:26:43 UTC near the western end of the Sultandağı Fault. Analysis of the coulomb stress transfer associated with the nearby M6.0 earthquake on 15 December 2000 suggests that these stress changes triggered the 2002 mainshock. The epicentre of the mainshock lies near the termination of the rupture associated with the earlier earthquake, consistent with this interpretation.

== Damage and casualties ==
In Afyonkarahisar Province, 44 deaths and 318 injuries were recorded. In Konya Province, one person suffered a fatal heart attack and seven others were injured from jumping from windows and balconies in the city of Konya, with another death and seven injuries recorded in Akşehir. There was significant damage in eight of the 18 districts in Afyonkarahisar Province and some damage in Akşehir in Konya Province. A total of 4,051 residential and 339 commercial buildings either collapsed or were badly damaged. A further 10,402 residential and 884 commercial buildings suffered either low or medium levels of damage. The most damaged building type was the traditional Himis style, which consists of timber frames with adobe and rubble infill and heavy roofs. Collapses of this building type were responsible for causing most of the deaths and injuries in the earthquake. The district of Çay suffered the most damage and had the greatest number of fatalities, with 1,226 residential buildings and 245 commercial buildings heavily affected.

Çay District reported 23 fatalities and 76 wounded; the village of Eber alone reported 15 fatalities and 30 injuries, with 300 of the 450 households severely damaged or destroyed by the earthquake. There were also 15 deaths in Sultandağı. In Bolvadin, two people were killed, 200 more were injured, 4,041 residential buildings and 697 commercial buildings were affected. Afyonkarahisar city also reported two fatalities and 1,153 severely affected residential and commercial buildings, with 1,773 other structures receiving varying degrees of damage in the city. Five additional villages in Afyon Province reported destroyed homes, with collapsing barns killing numerous livestock and multiple building fires reported.

== Response ==
The Turkish Red Crescent (TRC) provided 20,000 tents, 50,000 blankets, 3,480 stoves and 13 mobile kitchens to the affected area. TRC teams were immediately deployed to help evacuate survivors from affected areas, provide first aid and distribute 5,000 winter tents, 2,500 heaters and 21,000 blankets. They also set up 13 mobile kitchens in Sultandağı which provided hot meals twice a day to some 3,000 people. A mobile health team, comprising three ambulances, one mobile clinic, one blood service unit, three doctors, eight nurses and two technicians, traveled throughout the affected region. The TRC mobilized some 77 personnel and volunteers from their headquarters in Ankara as well as from the Afyon branch, who also helped repair damaged water and electricity lines. At 11:30 TRT on 3 February, 1,000 tents, 3,000 blankets and five portable kitchens were delivered from the TRC Ankara warehouse to the affected area. Some 1,000 tents and more blankets were being prepared for dispatch depending on the situation and info from evaluation teams. An estimated 7,000 tents and 10,000 blankets were mobilized for distribution.

== See also ==
- List of earthquakes in 2002
- List of earthquakes in Turkey
