= 2002 Port Vila earthquake =

Earthquakes in Vanuatu

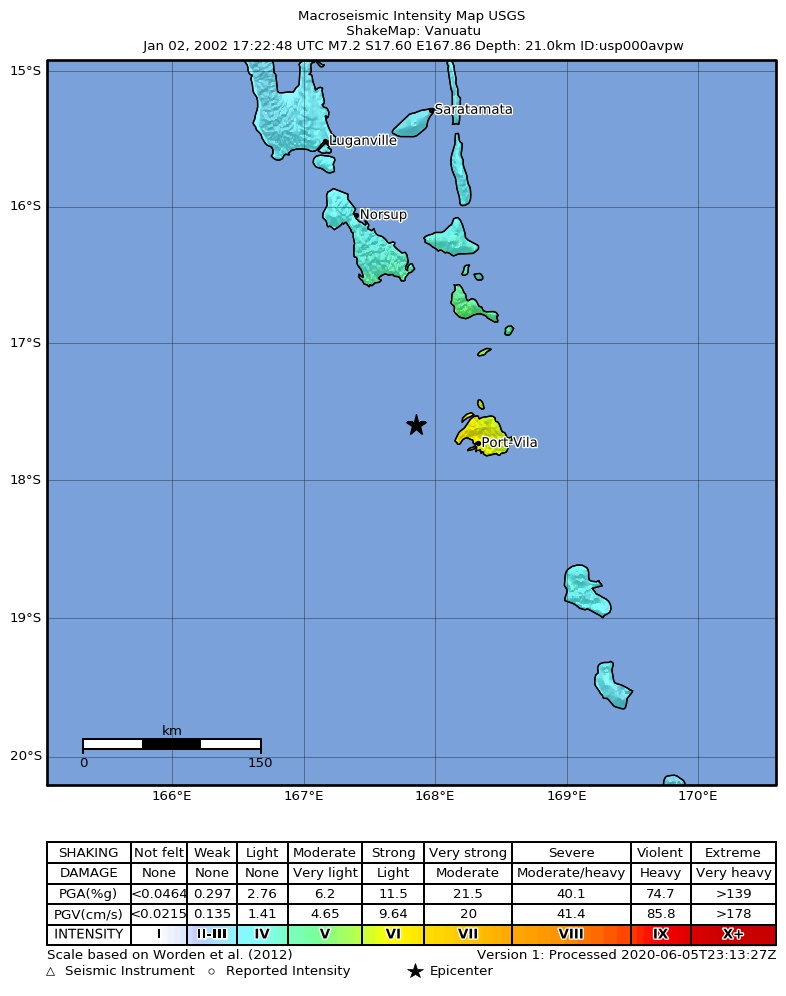
- USGS ShakeMap

- Location within Oceania
- UTC time: 2002-01-02 17:22:48
- ISC event: 2431530
- USGS-ANSS: ComCat
- Local date: 3 January 2002
- Local time: 04:22:48 (UTC+11)
- Magnitude: 7.2 M_{w}
- Depth: 21.0 km (13.0 mi)
- Epicenter: 17.600°S 167.856°E
- Fault: New Hebrides Subduction Zone
- Type: Oblique-Reverse
- Areas affected: Shefa Province, Vanuatu
- Max. intensity: MMI X (Extreme)
- Tsunami: Yes (40 cm−3 m)
- Aftershocks: 6.7 M_{w}
- Casualties: "Several" injuries

The 2002 Port Vila earthquake occurred in the early dawn of 3 January 2002, 4:22 a.m. local time (UTC+11) northwest of Port Vila, the capital of Vanuatu. It had a magnitude of 7.2 M_{w} and a maximum intensity of X (Extreme) west of the island on the Modified Mercalli intensity scale. There are no exact estimates on the number of injured individuals, but the majority of accounts say there were "several" amounts of injured civilians. the event also caused a minor tsunami of about 0.4–0.8 m just 11 minutes after the quake.

== Tectonic setting ==
The tremor was caused by the convergence of the Australian plate and the New Hebrides microplate. Different rates of convergence are present in different regions, in the southern Tanna regions the relative movement is oriented at around N244 ±4 and has a uniform rate of 11.7±0.8 cm/yr. The rate in Efaté, near the epicenter, was at around 0.3±0.9 cm/yr, oriented N242 ±4. Both azimuths very well compare with slip vectors of the last major earthquakes. Lastly, in the North, the rate at Santo is only 3.6 ±1.2 cm/yr, oriented N253 ± 26. The difference in the convergence rates between Santo on the one hand and Efaté and Tanna in the other hand points to a right lateral shear zone between Santo and Efaté. At Santo where the plate coupling is very high, the very low convergence rate might be related to the absence of recent strong earthquakes. No significant variations are detected for the baselines within the Australia plate. Relatively to a western North Fiji basin (WNFB) reference, the northern and southern segments rotate in opposite directions, consistently with the extension observed in the troughs east of both segments. Both rotations combine in Central Vanuatu into an eastward translation that "bulldozes" the central segment into the WNFB at ~55 mm/yr. That model suggests that the motion of the central segment, forced by the subduction/collision of the D'Entrecasteaux ridge, influences the motion of the adjoining segments. The New Caledonia archipelago is motionless with respect to the rest of the Australia plate despite the incipient interaction between the Loyalty ridge and the NH margin. Southeast of the interaction area, convergence is partitioned into a ~50 mm/yr trench-normal component accommodated at the trench and a ~90 mm/yr trench-parallel component, close to the A/P convergence, and presumably accommodated by a transform boundary at the rear of the NH arc.

== Earthquake ==
Preliminary magnitudes for the earthquake were between 7.1 and 7.4 M_{w} in magnitude. Later, the United States Geological Survey settled on a magnitude of 7.2 M_{w}. The entirety of the populace of Efate were shaken, added by several aftershocks that continued to rock the area. According to the local authorities, the seismic intensities were recorded as high as X (Extreme) or for comparison similar to the strength of a much larger 8.2 magnitude earthquake.

=== Tsunami ===
About 500 people had fled to higher ground in fear of a tsunami. Eyewitnesses had reportedly seen 3 m (9.8 ft) waves approaching the shores; however, the maximum run-up crest height of the tsunami recorded by gauges were only 30–40 cm (12–16 in).

== Damage ==
There were no immediate reports of serious casualties but the earthquake caused major damage to buildings and infrastructure such as numerous schools, as well as factories and shops that were deemed unsafe. The Teuma bridge, which links the southern coast of Efate to the capital, was badly damaged. Three bridges other bridges that connect other parts of the island, as well as other infrastructure from other small communities within Mele Bay, sustained heavy damage. Landslides blocked and buried many roads, most notably one that links to the main wharf in Klems Hill. The condition of agriculture in the area was dire and would be even more crippled adding to which more possibly strong aftershocks as well as heavy rains that may hit the areas.

== Response ==
New Zealand offered about $100,000 for the immediate repair of the Teuma bridge. Matt Robson, The Associate Foreign Affairs Minister of New Zealand from 1999 to 2002, said the following: "This cash grant will go towards temporary repair of the Teouma bridge on the main island of Efate and other immediate repair work to infrastructure links damaged by the earthquake," "Vanuatu's roads and the Teouma Bridge have sustained major damage from the earthquake, cutting off many vital transport links; The Teouma Bridge is a particularly important link for those who live in the northern and eastern parts of Efate and rely on ready access to Port Vila for their income. These repairs will stabilise the bridge and enable them to continue commuting to the capital while a permanent solution to building a new bridge is found." The FRANZ (France, Australia and New Zealand) group has promised to keep an eye on the National Disaster Management office and Public Works Department to assess the need for long term donor assistance. The Vanuatu Red Cross Society's (VRCS) Operation Centre had to be centered inside a large tent because the main headquarters building was seriously damaged from the quake. The Red Cross response was helping those who were severely traumatized by the earthquake and to those who sustained minor to moderate injuries from falling debris. The VRCS sent 11 response rescuers who were trained in first aid and disaster response, they were deployed immediately after the earthquake to Port Vila as well as communities in Mele, Melemaat, Blacksands, and Erangorango, the said most vulnerably dangerous communities in the low-lying flood plain area. All VRCS staff and volunteers based on Efate were on a 24-hour standby.

== See also ==
- List of earthquakes in 2002
- List of earthquakes in Vanuatu
- 2024 Port Vila earthquake
