= Iririki =

Island in Shefa Province, Vanuatu

- Island resort
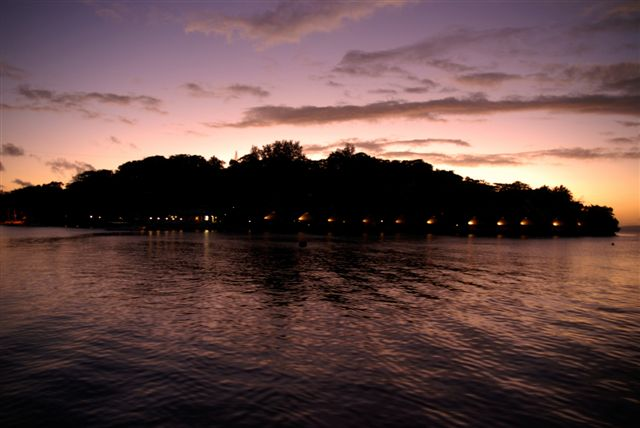

- Location in Vanuatu
- Coordinates: 17°46′S 168°17′E
- Country: Vanuatu
- Province: Shefa Province

Area
  - Total: 0.279 km^{2} (0.108 sq mi)
- Time zone: UTC+11 (VUT)
- Website: Official website

Iririki is a privately owned island resort located in Mele Bay, Port Vila, the Capital of Vanuatu.The island is 2 minutes boat ride from the centre of Port Vila and has extensive coral reef surrounding it as well as Port Vila’s best beach. Historically, before becoming a resort, it was the British High Commissioner’s residence.

== History ==
- 1910 – The first British Hospital in the New Hebrides was established on Iririki Island in memory of the well-known Presbyterian missionary John G Paton. Patients were seen for such ailments as broken bones, meningitis, and rheumatic fever, and Pacific islanders were trained in tropical disease management.
- 1913 – Iririki Island housed the British Residency who leased the island from missionaries for 99 years. The Residency was located at the peak of Iririki (reached by climbing 179 steps), affording it magnificent views to Port Vila and the surrounding bay. The original household was built for the Queen for an overnight visit, and subsequently accommodated the British High Commissioner.
- 1980 – On independence, the residence was abandoned.
- 1983 – After consideration by the Ifira Islanders, they leased the Island to Peter Nicholson to construct it into a resort.
- 1987 – Cyclone Uma hit Iririki Island and Port Vila with 200 km (124 mi) winds and flooding. Former Geelong AFL player Rick Graham and former Airline Pilots Federation President, Dick Holt, had purchased the resort. The resort returned to full operation after repairs that took approximately one year.
- 1991 – Rick and Ngaire Graham took over Iririki as resident owner/managers, turning the resort into a child-free sanctuary.
- 1996 – The resort underwent a $2 Million dollar renovation after extensive damage from three cyclones within less than two years.
- 2001 – The resort was sold to a consortium of Australian Business owners.
- 2009 – Policy changed to a family-friendly resort.
- 2015 – Category Five Cyclone Pam bore down on Vanuatu and caused extensive damage to the infrastructure of the Iririki Island Resort.
- 2016 – Iririki was reopened after being rebuilt and refurbished.
- 2017 – The resort faced possible liquidation. The original founders, Peter and Sue Nicholson expressed disappointment.
- 2019 – Iririki Island Resort and Casino was listed for sale by the JLL Hotels & Hospitality Group.
- 2023 – On 1 September 2023, Iririki Island Resort was purchased by Australian brothers Brendon and Mark Deeley.
- 2024, April – The Jewel Casino was shut down in April 2024.

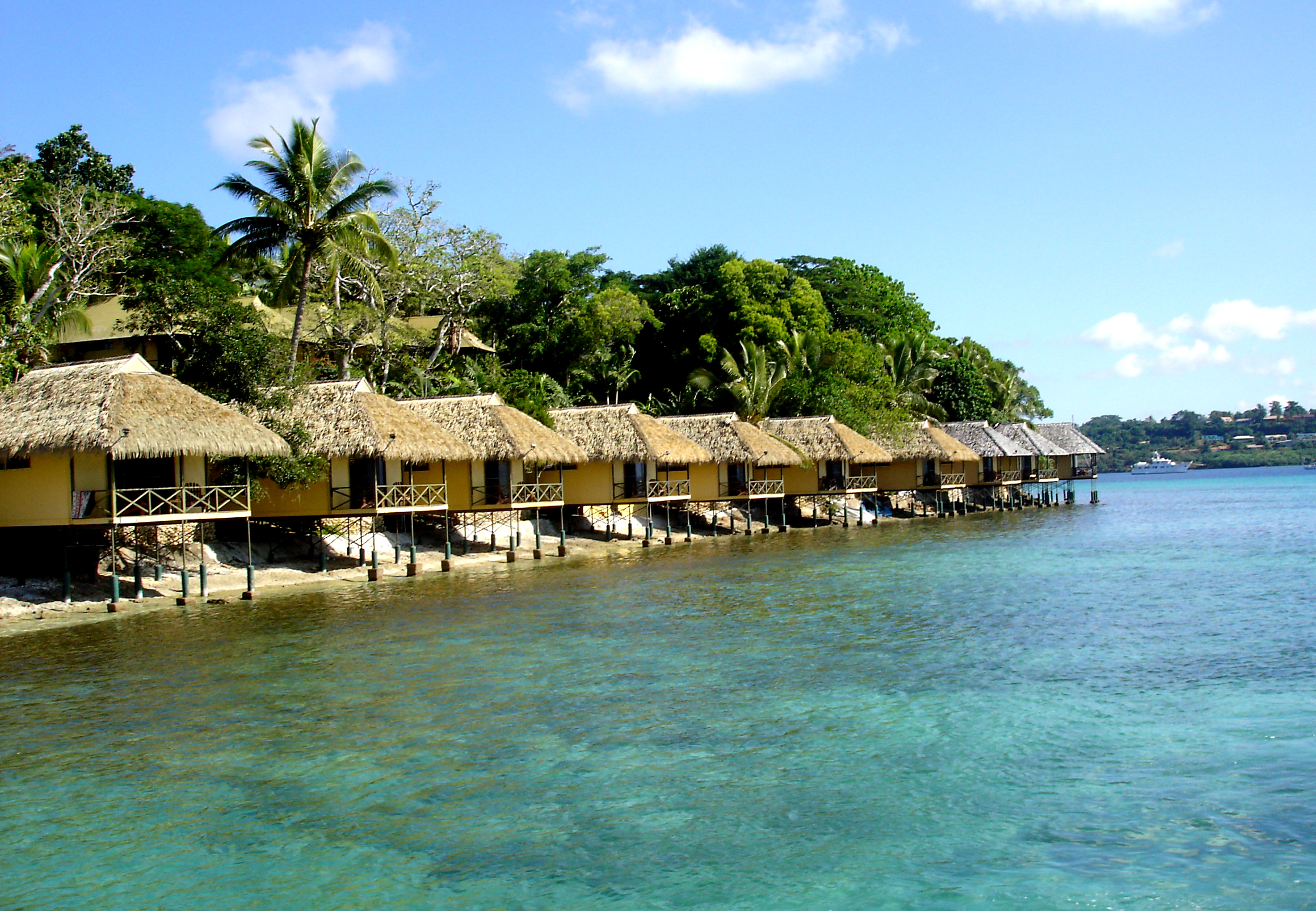
Iririki, Vanuatu

== Language ==
Bislama is the official language of Iririki. In addition, English and French are also widely spoken. Indigenous languages are spoken in the city.

== Climate ==
Port Vila has a tropical climate, with little variance in temperature throughout the year. Temperatures can reach 93.2 °F (34.0 °C), with an average low of 84.2 °F (29.0 °C). The region also enjoys southeast trade winds. The months of November to February are generally warm and humid, with April to October displaying optimal weather conditions.

== Bibliography ==
- Freeman, T.E.A., (2006), Doctor in Vanuatu: A Memoir, Institute of Pacific Studies
- Rodman, M.R., (2001), Houses Far From Home: British Colonial Space in the New Hebrides, University of Hawai'i Press, Honolulu, USA. ISBN 978-0-8248-2307-8
