= Port Vila earthquake =

Port Vila earthquake may refer to:

- 2002 Port Vila earthquake
- 2024 Port Vila earthquake
