= Xinlong County =

Xinlong County 新龙县 · ཉག་རོང་རྫོང་། Nyagrong, Nyarong
- County
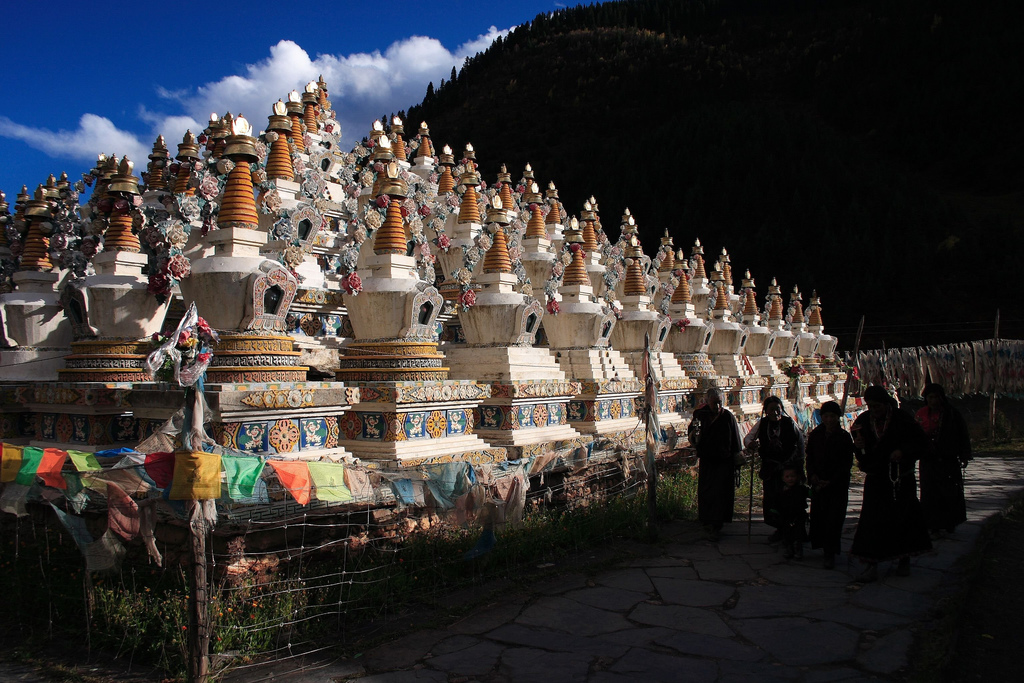

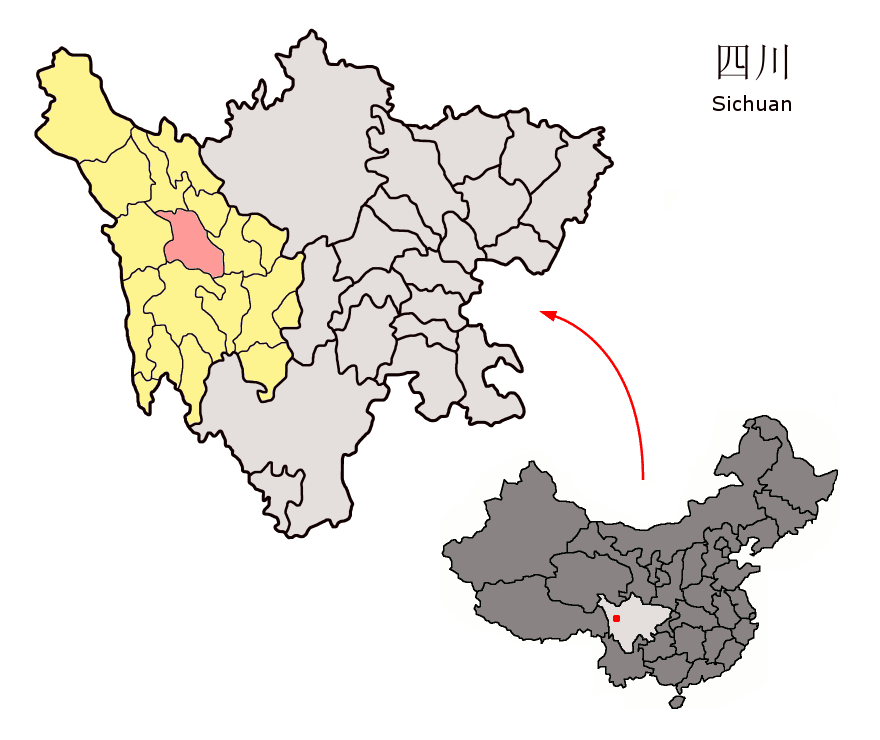
- Location of Xinlong County (red) within Garzê Prefecture (yellow) and Sichuan

- Location of the seat in Sichuan Xinlong (China)
- Coordinates: 30°56′20″N 100°18′40″E
- Country: China
- Province: Sichuan
- Autonomous prefecture: Garzê
- County seat: Rinoi (Rulong)

Area
  - Total: 8,570 km^{2} (3,310 sq mi)

Population (2020)
  - Total: 45,698
  - Density: 5.33/km^{2} (13.8/sq mi)
- Time zone: UTC+8 (China Standard)
- Website: www.gzxl.gov.cn

Xinlong County

Chinese name
- Simplified Chinese: 新龙县
- Traditional Chinese: 新龍縣
Transcriptions
Standard Mandarin
- Hanyu Pinyin: Xīnlóng Xiàn

Tibetan name
- Tibetan: ཉག་རོང་རྫོང་།
Transcriptions
- Wylie: nyag rong rdzong
- Tibetan Pinyin: Nyagrong Zong

Xinlong or Nyagrong County (Chinese: 新龙县; Tibetan: ཉག་རོང་རྫོང་།) is a county in the west of Sichuan Province, China. It is under the administration of the Garzê Tibetan Autonomous Prefecture.

Xinlong County is part of historical region of Nyarong.

Jazi (Nyarong Jazi Gon; Jazi Gon Sangngak Dechen Choling; gya bzi dgon, gya dgon, ja bzi dgon gsang sngags bde chen chos gling; Chinese: 甲孜寺; pinyin: Jiǎzī Sì) is a Nyingma monastery in Xilong County that was founded in 1866. Jazi Amnye Drodul Pema Garwang Lingpa (1901–1975) studied here as a young boy, before going to Tromge Monastery.

== Administrative divisions ==
Xinlong County is divided into 6 towns and 10 townships.

Name	Simplified Chinese	Hanyu Pinyin	Tibetan	Wylie	Administrative division code
Towns
Rinoi Town (Rinang, Rulong)	如龙镇	Rúlóng Zhèn	རི་བསྣོལ་ཀྲེན།	ri bsnol kren	513329100
Lharima Town (Larima, Lagruma)	拉日马镇	Lārìmǎ Zhèn	ལྷ་རི་མ་ཀྲེན།	lha ri ma kren	513329101
Dagin Town (Dagain, Dagai)	大盖镇	Dàgài Zhèn	བརྡ་ཀིན་ཀྲེན།	brda kin kren	513329102
Tanggyi Town (Tongxiao)	通宵镇	Tōngxiāo Zhèn	ཐང་སྐྱིད་ཀྲེན།	thang skyid kren	513329103
Sêr'oi Town (Sewei)	色威镇	Sèwēi Zhèn	གསེར་འོད་ཀྲེན།	gser 'od kren	513329104
Yanglaxi Town (Youlaxi)	尤拉西镇	Yóulāxī Zhèn	གཡང་ལ་གཤིས་ཀྲེན།	g.yang la gshis kren	513329105
Townships
Sadoi Township (Shadui)	沙堆乡	Shāduī Xiāng	ས་སྟོད་ཤང་།	sa stod shang	513329200
Ralang Township (Raolu)	绕鲁乡	Ràolǔ Xiāng	ར་ལངས་ཤང་།	ra langs shang	513329203
Pangmai Township (Bangmai, Bomei)	博美乡	Bóměi Xiāng	བང་སྨད་ཤང་།	bang smad shang	513329207
Zitogxi Township (Zituoxi)	子拖西乡	Zǐtuōxī Xiāng	རྩི་ཐོག་གཤིས་ཤང་།	rtsi thog gshis shang	513329209
Baxi Township (Heping)	和平乡	Hépíng Xiāng	འབའ་གཤིས་ཤང་།	'ba' gshis shang	513329210
Norkog Township (Luogu)	洛古乡	Luógǔ Xiāng	ནོར་ཁོག་ཤང་།	nor khog shang	513329211
Xanglongxi Township (Xionglongxi)	雄龙西乡	Xiónglóngxī Xiāng	ཤང་ལོང་གཤིས་ཤང་།	shang long gshis shang	513329212
Mari Township	麻日乡	Márì Xiāng	མ་རིད་ཤང་།	ma rid shang	513329213
Yangnü Township (Youyi)	友谊乡	Yǒuyì Xiāng	གཡང་ནུས་ཤང་།	g.yang nus shang	513329215
Xindo Township (Yinduo)	银多乡	Yínduō Xiāng	བཞི་མདོ་ཤང་།	bzhi mdo shang	513329217

== Climate ==
Climate data for Xinlong, elevation 3,000 m (9,800 ft), (1991–2020 normals, extremes 1981–present)
Month	Jan	Feb	Mar	Apr	May	Jun	Jul	Aug	Sep	Oct	Nov	Dec	Year
Record high °C (°F)	24.1 (75.4)	23.5 (74.3)	29.1 (84.4)	30.2 (86.4)	32.5 (90.5)	33.6 (92.5)	33.2 (91.8)	33.0 (91.4)	32.2 (90.0)	29.3 (84.7)	24.2 (75.6)	21.4 (70.5)	33.6 (92.5)
Mean daily maximum °C (°F)	10.5 (50.9)	12.9 (55.2)	15.5 (59.9)	18.8 (65.8)	22.2 (72.0)	23.6 (74.5)	23.9 (75.0)	24.2 (75.6)	22.2 (72.0)	18.6 (65.5)	14.7 (58.5)	10.9 (51.6)	18.2 (64.7)
Daily mean °C (°F)	−1.2 (29.8)	1.7 (35.1)	5.0 (41.0)	8.6 (47.5)	12.3 (54.1)	14.5 (58.1)	15.3 (59.5)	15.0 (59.0)	12.8 (55.0)	8.4 (47.1)	3.1 (37.6)	−1.0 (30.2)	7.9 (46.2)
Mean daily minimum °C (°F)	−10.0 (14.0)	−7.0 (19.4)	−3.0 (26.6)	1.1 (34.0)	5.1 (41.2)	9.0 (48.2)	10.3 (50.5)	9.8 (49.6)	7.6 (45.7)	2.0 (35.6)	−4.7 (23.5)	−9.5 (14.9)	0.9 (33.6)
Record low °C (°F)	−19.0 (−2.2)	−16.0 (3.2)	−13.8 (7.2)	−7.5 (18.5)	−4.2 (24.4)	0.3 (32.5)	3.0 (37.4)	1.9 (35.4)	−1.6 (29.1)	−6.7 (19.9)	−13.3 (8.1)	−19.2 (−2.6)	−19.2 (−2.6)
Average precipitation mm (inches)	1.2 (0.05)	3.6 (0.14)	11.4 (0.45)	29.4 (1.16)	63.1 (2.48)	142.6 (5.61)	142.8 (5.62)	113.5 (4.47)	105.1 (4.14)	34.5 (1.36)	4.5 (0.18)	1.3 (0.05)	653 (25.71)
Average precipitation days (≥ 0.1 mm)	1.5	2.7	7.4	11.7	16.2	22.7	21.9	19.2	18.3	11.4	3.8	1.0	137.8
Average snowy days	3.3	5.3	7.8	2.8	0.1	0.1	0	0	0	1.0	4.4	2.2	27
Average relative humidity (%)	36	37	44	50	57	69	73	72	73	65	49	40	55
Mean monthly sunshine hours	165.6	148.2	161.3	170.2	181.8	158.1	155.1	160.3	153.4	164.2	167.2	164.6	1,950
Percentage possible sunshine	51	47	43	44	43	37	36	39	42	47	53	52	45
Source: China Meteorological Administration All-time October high
