= 2002 Gilgit-Baltistan earthquakes =

2002 earthquakes in Pakistan

- Location within Pakistan
- UTC time: 2002-11-01 22:09:29
- 2002-11-20 21:32:30
- ISC event: 6121584
- 6137392
- USGS-ANSS: ComCat
- ComCat
- Local date: 2 November 2002
- 21 November 2002
- Local time: 03:09:29 PKT (UTC+5)
- 02:32:29 PKT (UTC+5)
- Magnitude: M_{w} 5.4
- M_{w} 6.3
- Depth: 33 km (21 mi)
- Epicenter: 35.414°N 74.515°E
- Areas affected: Gilgit-Baltistan, Pakistan
- Max. intensity: A: MMI VII (Very strong) B: MMI IX (Violent) (21 November)
- Landslides: Yes
- Casualties: 41 fatalities, 168 injuries

In November 2002, two earthquakes struck northern Pakistan, causing major damage to many villages in the Gilgit-Baltistan region and killing 41 people.

== Tectonic setting ==
Pakistan is directly influenced by the ongoing oblique convergence between the Indian Plate and Eurasian Plate. Along the northern margin of the India-Eurasia convergent boundary is the Main Himalayan Thrust which accommodates north–south continental collision. Thrust faulting in the Hindu Kush and Himalaya region is the direct result of the plate interaction. In the Balochistan region, the convergence is highly oblique, involving the large Chaman Fault; a left-lateral strike-slip structure. While a large portion of the boundary is accommodated by strike-slip faulting, the region also hosts the Sulaiman fold and thrust belt. Large thrust earthquakes including the 1934 Nepal–India earthquake were the direct result of the plate interaction. The 2005 Kashmir earthquake occurred near the vicinity of the Main Himalayan Thrust.

== Impact ==
Forty-one people were killed during the two tremors, including a family of seven who all died when their house collapsed, and many others were injured in Diamer District. At least 100 homes collapsed, 1,100 others were partially destroyed, 2,756 were damaged and 15,000 residents were displaced from the two earthquakes. More than 2,000 people were evacuated from their homes due to the earthquakes. The 2 November tremor killed 17 and injured 65 others, while the much stronger 21 November event killed 23, including 18 children, with 100 others injured.

The Karakoram Highway was damaged by landslides which killed hundreds of livestock but soon re-opened for light traffic. Efforts were being made to clear it for heavy traffic but landslides persisted due to the tremors. However one person died and three were injured when an aftershock triggered another landslide on the highway.

== See also ==
- List of earthquakes in 2002
- List of earthquakes in Pakistan
