= 2002 Morobe earthquake and landslide =

Earthquake and landslides in Morobe Province, Papua New Guinea

2002 Morobe earthquake
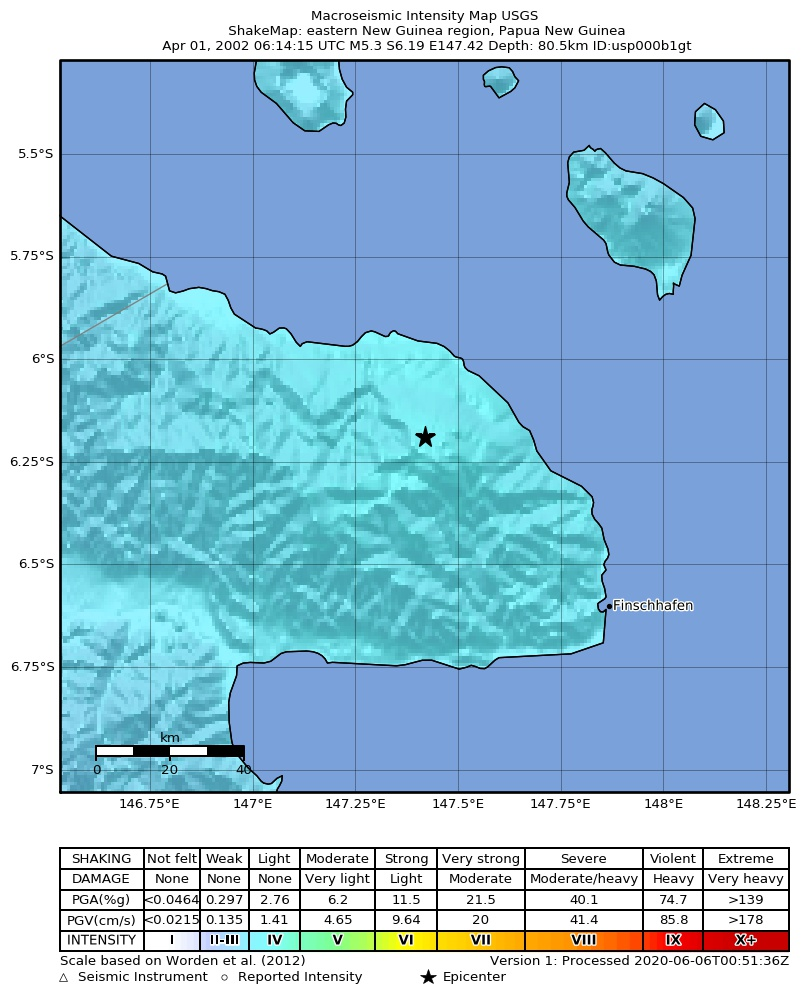
- USGS ShakeMap

- Location within Papua New Guinea
- UTC time: 2002-04-01 06:14:15
- ISC event: 2945331
- USGS-ANSS: ComCat
- Local date: April 1, 2002
- Local time: 16:14
- Magnitude: 5.3 M_{w}
- Depth: 80.5 km (50.0 mi)
- Epicenter: 6.191°S 147.421°E
- Areas affected: Papua New Guinea
- Max. intensity: MMI IV (Light)
- Landslides: Buried a village, responsible for casualties
- Casualties: 36 dead, 11 injured, 138 displaced

On April 1, 2002, a M_{w} 5.3 magnitude earthquake struck near the coast of Morobe Province in Papua New Guinea. It struck at a depth of 80.5 km beneath the surface and had a focal mechanism corresponding to reverse faulting. The earthquake triggered a landslide that killed 36 people and injured 11.

== Tectonic setting ==
Papua New Guinea is situated in a region where the Pacific, Australian, Caroline and several microplates are converging. At the Huon Peninsula, the Woodlark plate is moving north, converging beneath the South Bismarck plate along the Markham Valley. The tectonic motion forms a complex zone of subduction and continental collision zones which affect the region. Due to the location at a major plate boundary zone, Papua New Guinea is struck by earthquakes and tsunamis frequently and is one of the world's most seismically active regions.

The Finisterre Range located near the epicenter of the 2002 earthquake is predominantly volcanic in origin, consisting of volcaniclastics and volcanic strata. The range formed as a result of thrusting which began 3.7 million years ago and has an elevation of 4,000 meters. Bedrock landsliding is frequent within the range, caused by rainfall and earthquakes associated with the nearby thrust faults.

== Impact ==
A massive landslide was triggered by the earthquake, destroying twelve homes in the village of Kobung. Eleven people were injured, two of them seriously, and one was airlifted to Lae for treatment.

Surviving villagers immediately attempted to dig out those who were buried and about 50 survivors were evacuated to higher ground. Word of the disaster reached the provincial authorities in Lae about 6 hours after the event. The road network was cut due to the heavy rain, but the injured were evacuated by the helicopters that brought in the rescue workers. The landslide displaced the remaining 138 residents of the village.

== See also ==
- List of earthquakes in 2002
- List of earthquakes in Papua New Guinea
