= 2002 Taiwan earthquake =

Earthquake took place on March 31st 2002

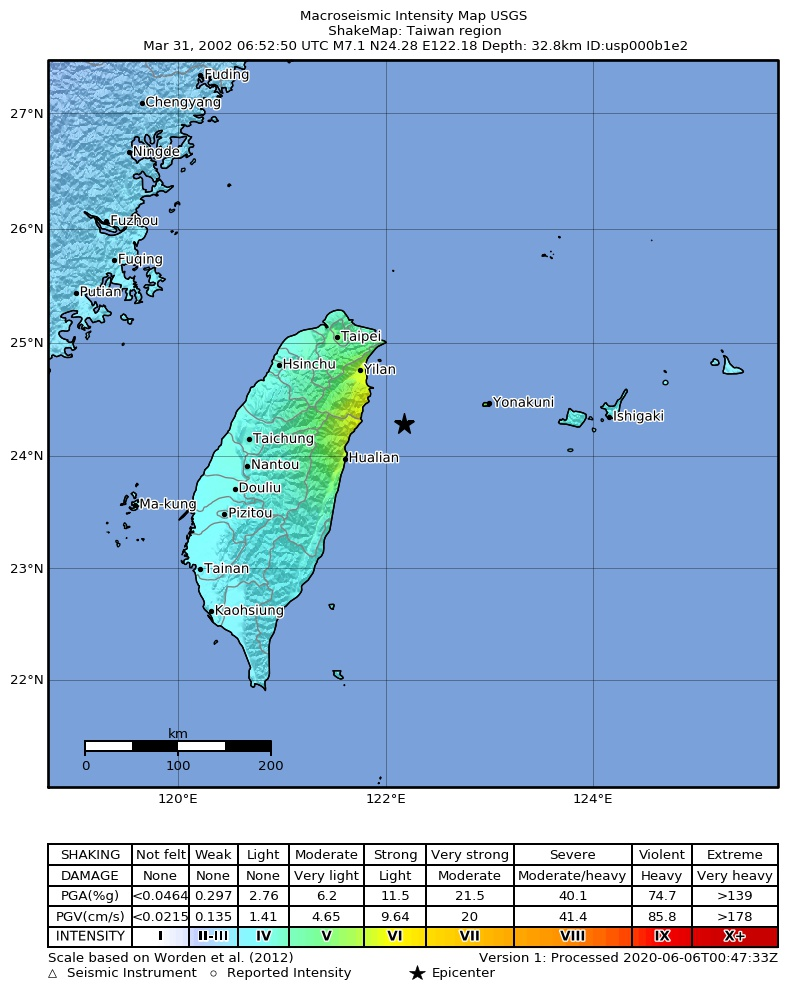
- USGS ShakeMap
- UTC time: 2002-03-31 06:52:52
- ISC event: 2944860
- USGS-ANSS: ComCat
- Local date: March 31, 2002
- Local time: 14:52:52
- Magnitude: 6.8 M_{L}， 7.1 M_{w}
- Depth: 32.8 kilometres (20 mi)
- Epicenter: 24.279°N 122.179°E
- Type: Reverse
- Max. intensity: MMI VIII (Severe)
- Tsunami: 20 cm
- Aftershocks: May 15, 2002 11:46:59 （6.2M_{L})
- Casualties: 5 dead, 213 injured

At 14:52 local time on 31 March 2002, an earthquake of magnitude 7.1 on the moment magnitude scale hit Taiwan. The epicenter was offshore from Hualien, which was the most severely affected area with a maximum felt intensity of VIII (Severe) on the Mercalli intensity scale. At least 5 deaths have been reported, with a further 213 injured.

== Tectonic setting ==
Taiwan has a history of strong earthquakes. The island is located within a complex zone of convergence between the Philippine Sea plate and Eurasian plate. At the location of the earthquake, these plates converge at a rate of 78 mm per year. To the south of Taiwan, oceanic crust of the Eurasian plate is subducting beneath the Philippine Sea plate creating an island arc, the Luzon Arc. At Taiwan the oceanic crust has been entirely subducted and the arc is currently colliding with continental crust of the Eurasian plate. To the north of Taiwan the Philippine Sea plate is in contrast subducting northwards beneath the Eurasian plate, forming the Ryukyu Arc. Within 200 km of this earthquake, there have been nine events of M≥7 during the preceding 40 years, including the M 7.7 1999 Jiji earthquake which resulted in over 2,400 deaths.

== Earthquake ==
The earthquake had a magnitude of 7.1 M_{wc} with a hypocentral depth of 32.8 km. The depth and focal mechanism are consistent with moderate angle reverse faulting on the plate boundary interface that dips northwards beneath the western end of the Ryukyu arc.

== Tsunami ==
A small tsunami (20 cm) was observed on Yonaguni, in the Yaeyama Islands.

== Damage ==
There was significant damage to buildings in the Taipei area, with three collapsing and the destruction of about 100 houses. An apartment building in the central part of the city collapsed, trapping 13 and injuring five. Cranes at the then Taipei World Financial Center, which was under construction, partly collapsed, killing five workers and injuring a further 10 people. At another construction site, scaffolding fell from a building. There was disruption to supplies of electricity, water and gas. The Taipei metro train services were suspended due to a ruptured water pipe. Large cracks appeared in a city bridge. In Hualien, landslides blocked a highway and injured a child. The northeastern coastal areas were affected by many landslides. In total, there were 5 deaths and 213 people reported injured. Reports of shaking came as far as Hong Kong.

== See also ==
- List of earthquakes in 2002
- List of earthquakes in Taiwan
