= List of earthquakes in Kosovo =

This is an incomplete list of earthquakes in Kosovo. Kosovo is a country with relatively high seismic activity in the Balkan Peninsula. In different periods Kosovo has faced small and large earthquakes. Since the establishment of Kosovo Seismological Survey in 2008 there have been 901 earthquakes in Kosovo with a magnitude of 1.5 and up to 5.2 on the Richter scale.

Date	Location	Magnitude	Depth	MMI	Deaths	Injuries	Notes	Ref
2026-02-11	Prevalla	4.8	5km	VI			Felt all across Kosovo, barely any damage.	
2024-12-12	Dragash	4.3	10km	V				
2013-11-18	Vushtrri	4.8	10 km	VI			Minimal damage to houses	
2010-03-10	Peja, Istog	5.2	10 km	VII			Minor damage to houses	
2002-04-24	Gjilan	5.7	10 km	VII	1	100	Moderate damage	
1980-05-18	Kopaonik	5.7	9 km	VIII		50	Severe damage	
1942-02-05	Klina	5.2		VIII			Moderate damage	
1945-09-26	Prizren	5.0		VII			Moderate damage	
1922-09-03	Gjakova	5.3		VIII			Moderate damage	
1921-10-03	Kacanik-Viti	5.6		VIII			Major damage	
1921-09-02	Gjilan	5.0		VIII			Moderate damage	
1921-08-15	Viti	5.4		VIII			Major damage	
1921-08-10	Ferizaj-Viti	6.1		IX			Major damage	
1755-02-26	Ferizaj	6.1		IX			Major damage	
1622-11-11	Peja	6.0		VIII			Moderate damage	
1662-02-11	Peja	5.5						
1456-06-16	Prizren	6.0		VIII			Major damage	
