= Yinduo Township, Sichuan =

Yinduo Township 银多乡
- Township
- Yinduoxiang
- Location in Sichuan
- Coordinates: 31°24′9″N 99°54′40″E
- Country: People's Republic of China
- Province: Sichuan
- Autonomous prefecture: Garzê Tibetan Autonomous Prefecture
- County: Xinlong County

Area
  - Total: 1,258 km^{2} (486 sq mi)

Population (2010)
  - Total: 1,767
  - Density: 1.405/km^{2} (3.638/sq mi)
- Time zone: UTC+8 (China Standard)

Yinduo (Mandarin: 银多乡) is a township in Xinlong County, Garzê Tibetan Autonomous Prefecture, Sichuan, China. In 2010, Yinduo Township had a total population of 1,767: 876 males and 891 females: 485 aged under 14, 1,122 aged between 15 and 65 and 160 aged over 65.
