= 2002 Kosovo earthquake =

Earthquake in Kosovo

2002 Gjilan earthquake
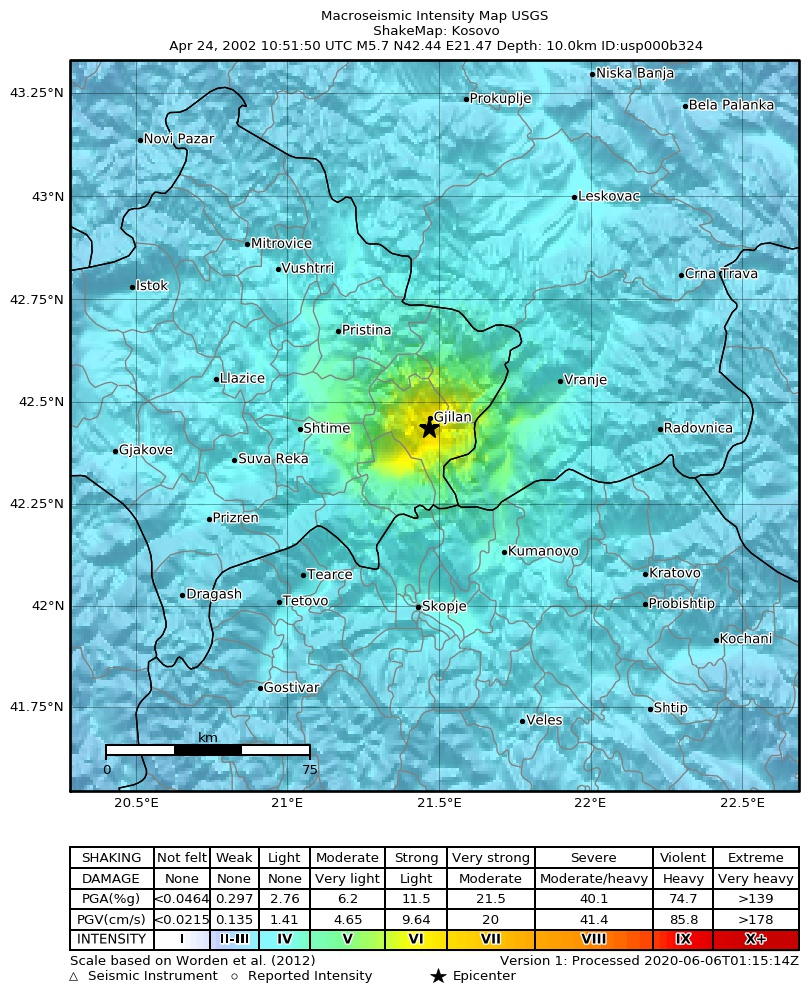
- ShakeMap created by the United States Geological Survey for the event
- UTC time: 2002-04-24 10:51:50
- ISC event: 3021752
- USGS-ANSS: ComCat
- Local date: April 24, 2002
- Local time: 11:51:50 CET
- Duration: 15 seconds
- Magnitude: 5.7 M_{w}
- Depth: 10.0 km (6.2 mi)
- Epicenter: 42.436°N 21.466°E
- Fault: Kacanik-Gjilan
- Type: Reverse dip-slip faults
- Areas affected: Gjilan
- Total damage: Many houses destroyed
- Max. intensity: MMI VII (Very strong); MSK-64 VII–VIII
- Tsunami: No
- Casualties: 1 dead, 100 injured

The 2002 Gjilan earthquake was a 5.7 magnitude earthquake that occurred on April 24, 2002 at 12:51:50 p.m. CET. This earthquake had a Mercalli intensity of VII (Very Strong). It occurred at a depth of 10 km, causing very strong shaking across much of Gjilan, moderate shaking in some parts in Ferizaj, and light tremors across Kosovo, and some tremors across neighboring parts of Kosovo.

== Earthquake ==
The earthquake was one of the strongest earthquake to hit Kosovo in many years. The epicenter was 2 km south of Gjilan, and its hypocenter was 10 km deep. In the area close to the epicenter, the greatest recorded Mercalli intensity for the DYFI map (Did You Feel It?) was VIII (Severe).

== Impact ==
According to The Irish Times, a man died and at least 100 people were injured. The dead man was Mehmet Salibichaj, a local barber from Gjilan. The earthquake caused damage to homes, shops etc. The earthquake lasted 15 seconds, and many stayed in shelters. Power Outages and broken gas lines occurred at Gjilan.

== Aftershocks ==
Over the next days, many aftershocks occurred, the largest being a 4.3 magnitude earthquake, 16 km from the mainshock, occurring at 12:24 p.m. local time, and another 4.3 magnitude earthquake, 5 km from the mainshock at 12:37 a.m.

== See also ==
- List of earthquakes in 2002
- List of earthquakes in Kosovo
- List of earthquakes in Albania
- List of earthquakes in Croatia
