= 2002 Au Sable Forks earthquake =

Rare earthquake in New York state

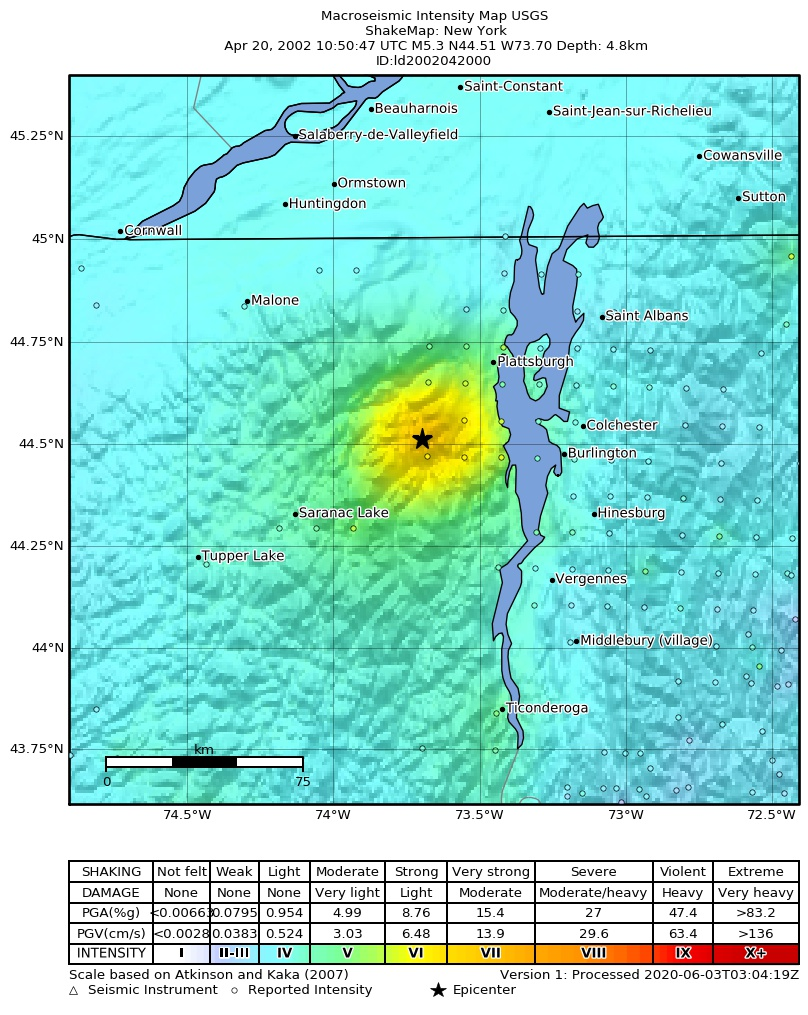
- USGS ShakeMap

- Location within New York
- UTC time: 2002-04-20 10:50:45
- ISC event: 2981775
- USGS-ANSS: ComCat
- Local date: April 20, 2002
- Local time: 06:50:45 EST
- Magnitude: 5.1 M_{w} 5.3 M_{L}
- Depth: 8.7 km (5 mi)
- Epicenter: 44.49°N 73.72°W
- Type: High-Angle Thrust
- Areas affected: New York, United States
- Total damage: $10 million
- Max. intensity: MMI VII (Very strong)
- Aftershocks: 80+ aftershocks, the largest being a 3.7 M_{L}
- Casualties: None

The 2002 Au Sable Forks earthquake was an unusual and rare earthquake that struck North Country on April 20, 2002, at 06:50:45 local time. This earthquake had a moment magnitude of 5.1 and a Modified Mercalli Intensity of VII (Very strong). There was damage near the epicenter however there were no injuries nor deaths. Shortly after, another earthquake measuring 3.7 struck the same area.

== Geologic setting ==
This earthquake and its aftershocks are located on the northeastern side of the Adirondack massif, on the Champlain fault zone. This fault zone is characterized by north–south striking brittle faults. These faults include both normal, usually high angle, as well as thrust/reverse faults. While Grenville-age structure is mostly striking east to west and is generally quite complex, the hard structure in the Adirondack Mountains are influenced by regional fracture zones that are trending north-northeast. Some of these are traced for hundreds of kilometers across the entire Adirondack massif and they have a clear expression in the morphology. However they cannot generally be classified as faults because they have surprisingly little accumulated displacement.

== Earthquake ==
The earthquake occurred near the town of Au Sable Forks, NY on April 20, 2002. It was the largest earthquake to strike the region since 1988 and the biggest to be observed on regional broadband station networks. The shaking was felt in a wide region from Canada to Pennsylvania. This event had a north–south striking thrust (reverse) fault mechanism at a depth of 8.7 km, which is consistent with the trend of usual faulting in the area. There were 80 aftershocks recorded more than a year after the earthquake, of which three had a magnitude of 3.0 or larger.

== Impact ==
Substantial damage was caused to roads, bridges, chimneys and water mains in Clinton and Essex counties. People also reported damage to homes like cracked walls and foundations, items knocked off shelves as well as broken windows. Despite the damages and the felt intensity, no one was injured or killed.

== Response ==
On May 16, 2002, a disaster declaration was issued by President George W. Bush for the Clinton, Essex, Franklin, Hamilton, Warren, and Washington counties.

== See also ==
- List of earthquakes in 2002
- List of earthquakes in the United States
- 1944 Cornwall–Massena earthquake
