= Au Sable Forks, New York =

- Hamlet and census-designated place
- Location in Clinton County and the state of New York.
- Coordinates: 44°26′39″N 73°40′34″W
- Country: United States
- State: New York
- Counties: Clinton (CDP portion), Essex
- Towns: Black Brook (CDP portion), Jay

Area
  - Total: 2.53 sq mi (6.54 km^{2})
  - Land: 2.48 sq mi (6.42 km^{2})
  - Water: 0.046 sq mi (0.12 km^{2})
- Elevation: 551 ft (168 m)

Population (2020)
  - Total: 509
  - Density: 205.4/sq mi (79.31/km^{2})
- Time zone: UTC-5 (Eastern (EST))
  - Summer (DST): UTC-4 (EDT)
- ZIP code: 12912
- Area code: 518
- FIPS code: 36-03254
- GNIS feature ID: 0979665

Au Sable Forks is a census-designated place which straddles both Clinton and Essex counties in New York State, United States. The northern half of the community, within Clinton County, is listed as the Au Sable Forks census-designated place (CDP). As of the 2020 census, Au Sable Forks had a population of 509.

== Geography ==
Au Sable Forks is located on the border of Clinton and Essex counties at 44°26′39″N 73°40′34″W (44.444063, −73.676013), centered on the point where the West Branch and the East Branch of the Au Sable River join to form the main confluence which flows into Au Sable Chasm and thence, into Lake Champlain.

According to the United States Census Bureau, the CDP portion of Au Sable Forks has a total area of 2.5 square miles (6.6 km^{2}), of which 0.02 square miles (0.06 km^{2}), or 0.89%, is water.

New York State Route 9N passes through the center of the community, leading 11 miles (18 km) northeast (downstream) to Keeseville and 6 miles (10 km) southwest (upstream on the East Branch) to Jay. Plattsburgh is 28 miles (45 km) to the northeast via NY-9N and Interstate 87.

The climate of Au Sable Forks is temperate, very cold in winter and fairly hot in summer. Au Sable Forks is known for its repetitive history of floods, with those of 1996 and 2011 causing grievous damage – these were 15 and 18 feet above flood stage respectively. Since the 2011 flood caused by Hurricane Irene, ice jams, once common, have become less frequent because of the alteration in hydrogeology caused by the flood, which was the most massive one recorded.

On April 20, 2002, a 5.0–5.3 Mw earthquake occurred north of the town. The shallow dip-slip shock had a maximum Mercalli intensity of VII (Very strong) and caused damage to roads, bridges, buildings, and chimneys.

== Demographics ==
Historical population
Census	Pop.	Note	%±
2000	666		—
2010	559		−16.1%
2020	509		−8.9%
U.S. Decennial Census

As of the 2000 census, there were 670 people, 265 households, and 175 families residing in the CDP. The population density was 268.5 inhabitants per square mile (103.7/km^{2}). There were 294 housing units at an average density of 117.8 per square mile (45.5/km^{2}). The racial makeup of the CDP was 98.51% White, 0.30% Black, 0.15% Native American, and 1.04% from two or more races. Hispanic or Latino of any race were 0.15% of the population.

There were 265 households, out of which 33.6% had children under the age of 18 living with them, 53.2% were married couples living together, 10.6% had a female householder with no husband present, and 33.6% were non-families. 29.8% of all households were made up of individuals, and 17.4% had someone living alone who was 65 years of age or older. The average household size was 2.53 and the average family size was 3.16.

In the CDP, the population was spread out, with 27.6% under the age of 18, 6.7% from 18 to 24, 29.1% from 25 to 44, 20.7% from 45 to 64, and 15.8% who were 65 years of age or older. The median age was 36 years. For every 100 females, there were 98.8 males. For every 100 females age 18 and over, there were 98.0 males.

The median income for a household in the CDP was $32,578, and the median income for a family was $37,500. Males had a median income of $30,859 versus $21,667 for females. The per capita income for the CDP was $14,816. About 10.6% of families and 13.5% of the population were below the poverty line, including 14.6% of those under age 18 and 14.8% of those age 65 or over.

== Education ==
The census-designated place is within the Au Sable Valley Central School District.

Au Sable Forks Elementary School is located on Church Lane in Essex County. Au Sable Valley High School is in Clintonville, and serves both Junior High and Senior High School students. Holy Name Catholic school on Main Street closed in 2013.

The Au Sable Forks Free Library is on Church Lane.

== Government and infrastructure ==
Black Brook Town Offices are located within Clinton County on North Main Street, with the County Seat in Plattsburgh, New York, while the Township of Jay Government Offices and the local Community Center is located within Essex County, on School Lane, with its County Seat located in Elizabethtown.

The US Post Office is on Forge Street.

The community is served by the Au Sable Forks Volunteer Fire Department, as well as a volunteer Au Sable Forks Ambulance Team.
