= Vanuatu Red Cross Society =

Organization

- Founded: 1992
- Type: Non-profit organisation
- Purpose: Humanitarian Aid
- Location: Vanuatu
- Affiliations: International Committee of the Red Cross; International Federation of Red Cross and Red Crescent Societies
- Website: http://www.vanuaturedcross.org/

Vanuatu Red Cross Society was founded in 1992. It has its headquarters in Port Vila.
