= Ayni Opera and Ballet Theatre =

- Театри давлатии академии опера ва балети ба номи Садриддин Айнӣ
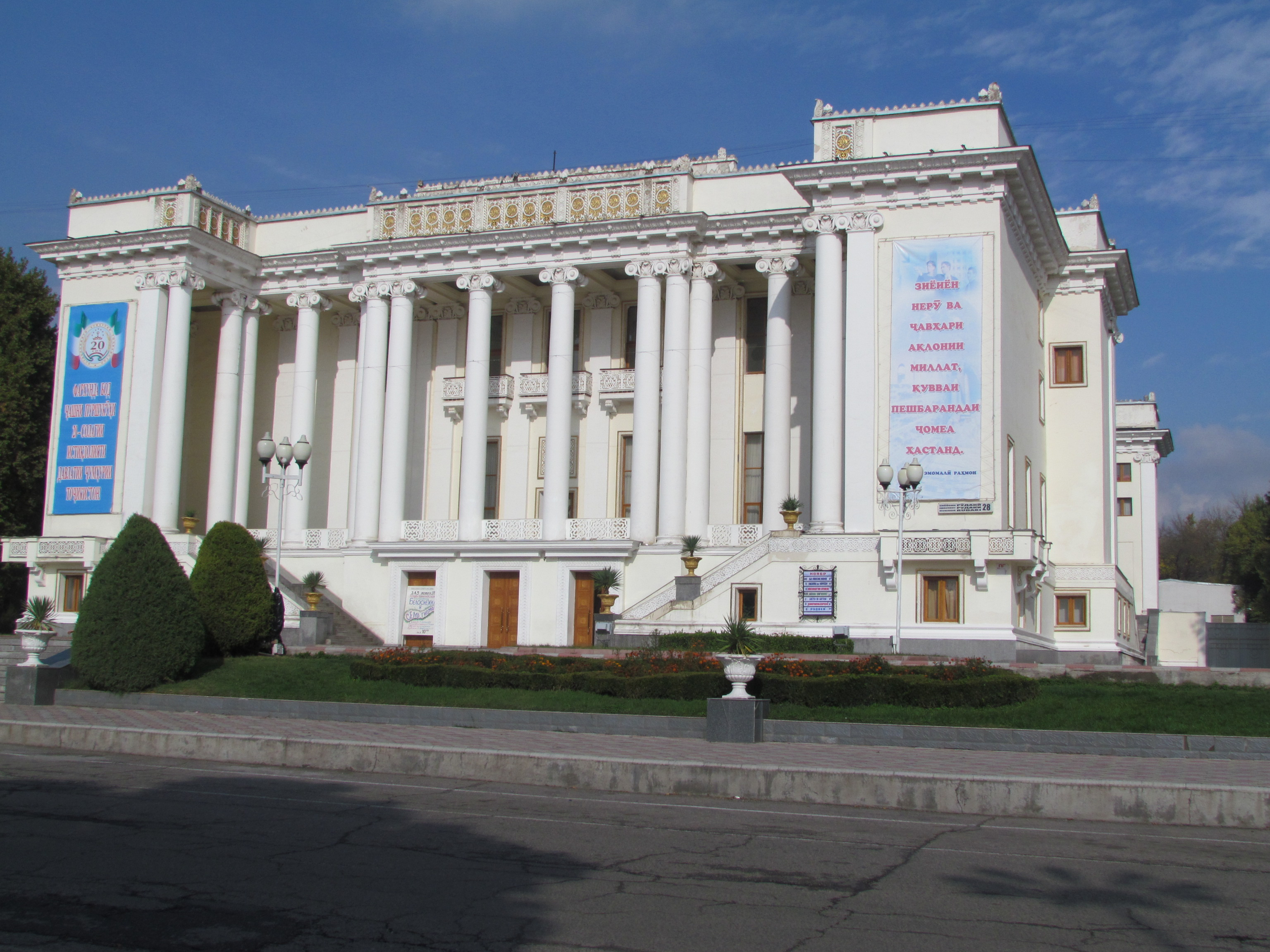
- Interactive map of the Ayni Opera and Ballet Theatre area
- Former names: Tajik Musical Theatre

General information
- Type: Theatre
- Location: 28 Husseinzoda Street, Dushanbe, Tajikistan
- Coordinates: 38°34′7″N 68°47′41″E
- Construction started: 1938
- Completed: 1940
- Opened: 1941

Design and construction
- Architects: D. Bilibin, V. Golly, A. Junger, M. Zakharov

Website
- operabalet.tj

Ayni Opera and Ballet Theatre, (Note: Tajik: Театри давлатии академии опера ва балети ба номи Садриддин Айнӣ, romanized: Teatri davlatii akademii opera va baleti ba nomi Sadriddin Aynī; Russian: Таджикский Государственный Академический театр оперы и балета им. С. Айни, romanized: Tadzhikskiy Gosudarstvennyy Akademicheskiy teatr opery i baleta im. S. Ayni) formerly known as the Tajik Musical Theatre, is a historic Soviet-era building and musical theatre in Dushanbe, Tajikistan. The building was named after Tajik poet Sadriddin Ayni.
