= San Julián, Chile =

Coordinates: 30°39′S 71°20′W

San Julian is a small town on the south bank of the Limarí river in Limarí Province, IV Region of Coquimbo, Chile, 15 km (9.3 mi) southwest of Ovalle. Administratively it is part of the commune of Ovalle.

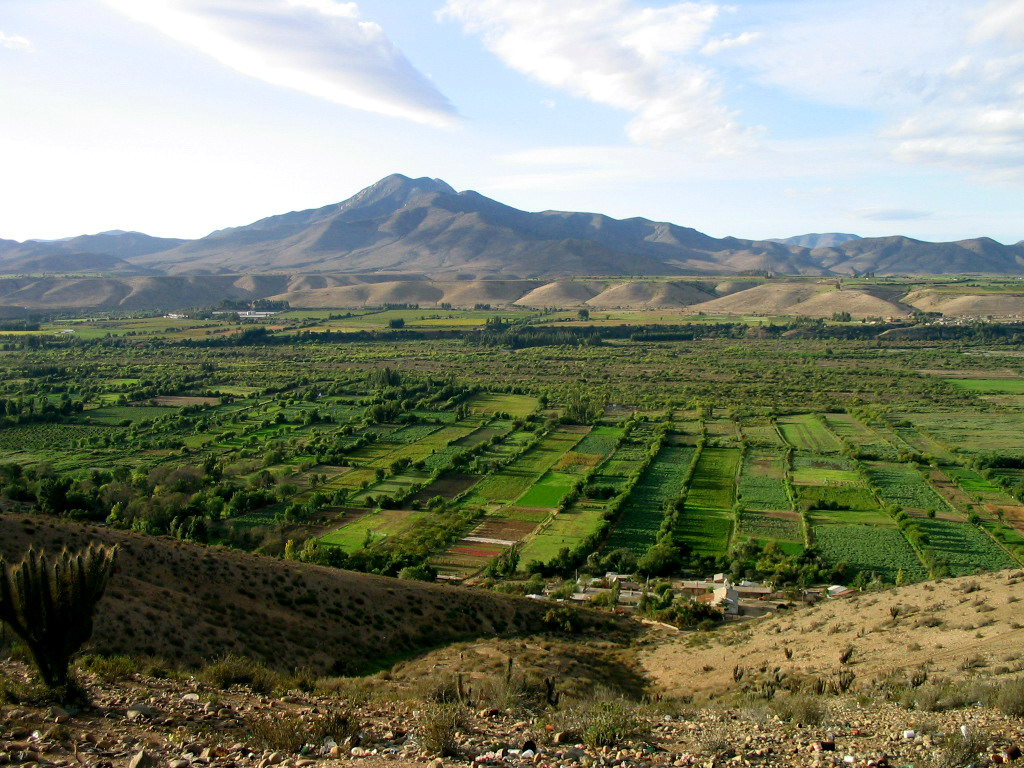
Cultivated fields at San Julian.

The village is a long street with houses usually somewhat distant from one another. The inhabitants are mainly small farmers who cultivate lands between the street and the river, corresponding to a large terrace of Limarí Valley.

== Economy ==
Artichoke is the main crop, followed in importance by paprika-type peppers. To a lesser extent also potatoes, onions, tomatoes, and fodder are cultivated. Growing of avocados is also relevant, which are virtually the only fruit with economic importance.

In recent years, important agricultural companies have made significant investments in the fields surrounding the village which kept uncultivated mainly due to limited irrigation. Thus, Concha y Toro has planted a significant area of vineyards, Contador Frutos has done similar with almonds, and a third company continues to expand the area planted with avocado trees, using the hillsides.

A significant part of the workforce of the place, mainly the younger ones, are agricultural workers, many of whom work for one of these three companies.
