= Gulbahar, Afghanistan =

Coordinates: 35°8′0″N 69°15′48″E

Gulbahar گل‌بهار
- Interactive map of Gulbahar گل‌بهار
- Province: Parwan

Gulbahar (Pashto: گلبهار Dari: گلبهار) is a town in Afghanistan, located 76 km north of Kabul. Gulbahar is a green, lush area with the best mulberry in the country.

== History ==
This war torn district, which was the battlefield between different forces in different eras, is located half in Parwan province and half in Kapisa province. A major textile company and Al-Beroni University exist within the Kapisa section of Gulbahar.

== Images ==
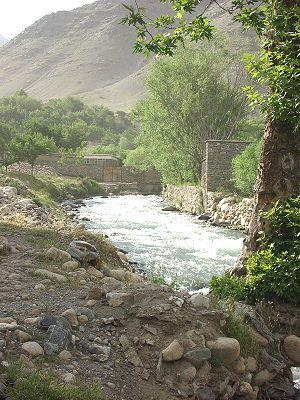
Shutool River reaching the location to join Panjshir river in Gulbahar

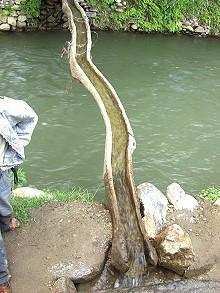
An old traditional tree trunk used as a water pipe

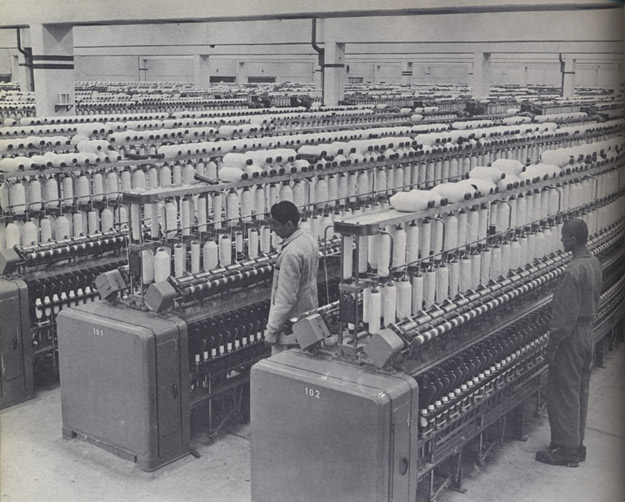
Gulbahar Textile Plant

== See also ==
- Parwan Province
- Kapisa Province
- Shomali Plain
