= Eber, Çay =

Eber
- Village
- Location within Turkey Location within Turkey Aegean
- Coordinates: 38.5986°N 31.1267°E
- Country: Turkey
- Province: Afyonkarahisar
- District: Çay
- Population (2021): 607
- Time zone: UTC+3 (TRT)

Eber is a village in the Çay District, Afyonkarahisar Province, Turkey. Its population is 607 (2021). Before the 2013 reorganisation, it was a town (belde).
