= Chuquis =

Coordinates: 28°54′S 66°58′W

- Municipality and village
- Interactive map of Chuquis
- Country: Argentina
- Province: La Rioja Province
- Time zone: UTC−3 (ART)

Chuquis is a municipality and village in La Rioja Province in northwestern Argentina.
