= Burica =

- Location within Panama
- Coordinates: 8°1′48″N 82°52′12″W
- Country: Panama
- Province: Chiriquí

Population (2008)
  - Total: 1 516

Burica is a town in the Chiriquí province of Panama.

== Sources ==
- World Gazeteer: Panama – World-Gazetteer.com
