= Nahrin =

- Location in Afghanistan
- Coordinates: 36°3′55″N 69°8′2″E
- Country: Afghanistan
- Province: Baghlan Province
- District: Nahrin District
- Time zone: + 4.30

Nahrin is a town in Baghlan Province in north-eastern Afghanistan.

It is the capital of Nahrin District.

== See also ==
- Baghlan Province
