= Mele Bay =

Bay of Efate, Vanuatu

Coordinates: 17°43′37″S 168°15′1″E

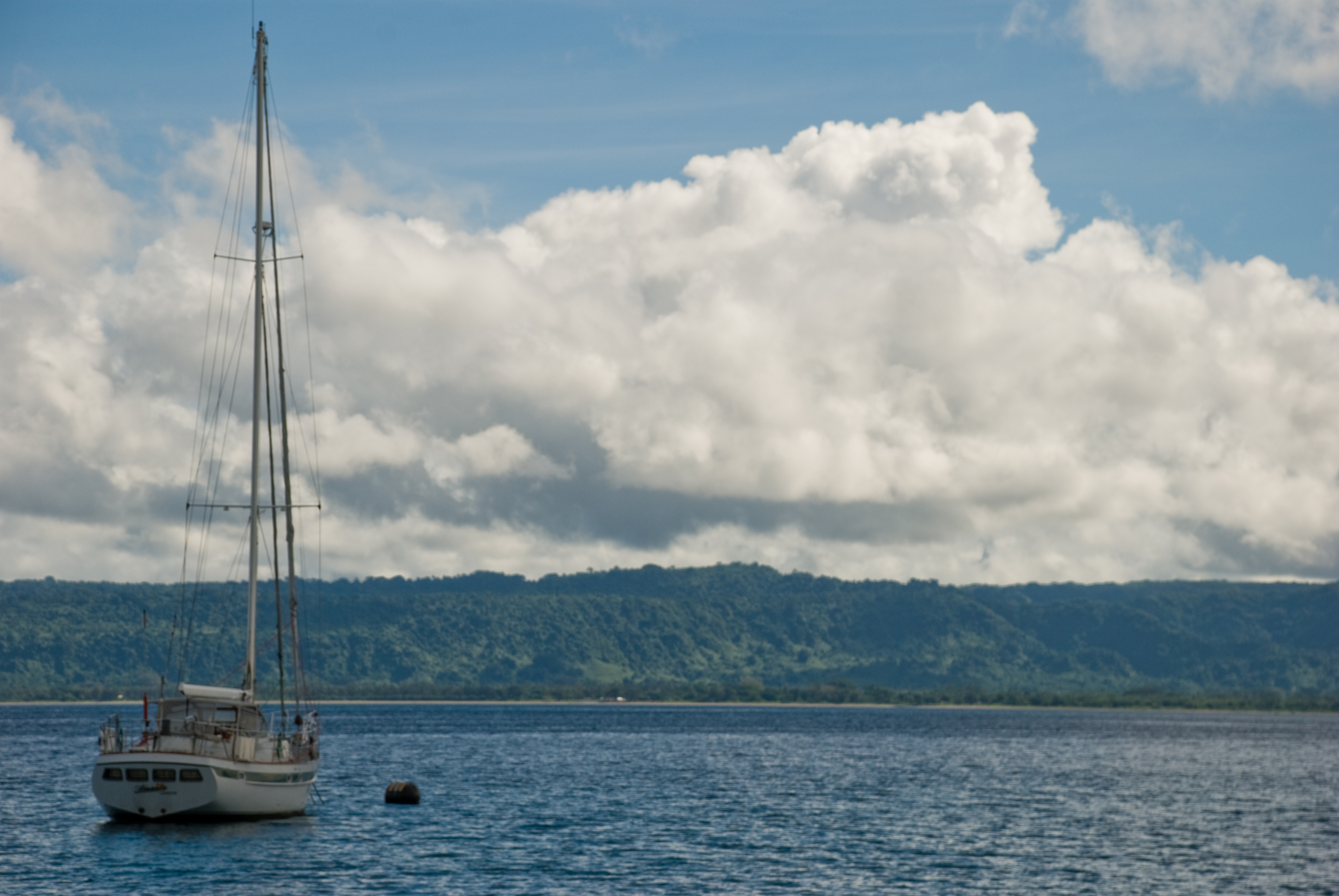

Mele Bay is a bay on the southwestern coast of Efate, Vanuatu. It is the main bay which leads into the smaller Vila Bay when approaching the capital of Port Vila by sea. Ifira Island lies towards Vila Bay, and is passed when approaching the town. The bay has no reef. To the south, the bay "tapers off to form Pango Point", and to the east is the Erakau lagoon.
