= 2002 West Papua earthquake =

Earthquake in Indonesia

- Location within Western New Guinea
- UTC time: 2002-10-10 10:50:20
- ISC event: 3477279
- USGS-ANSS: ComCat
- Local date: October 10, 2002
- Local time: 19:50:20 WIT (UTC+9)
- Duration: 3 minutes
- Magnitude: M_{w} 7.5
- Depth: 23.6 km (14.7 mi)
- Epicenter: 1.757°S 134.297°E
- Fault: Ransiki Fault
- Type: Strike-slip
- Areas affected: West Papua Province, Indonesia
- Total damage: More than 2,100 structures damaged or destroyed
- Max. intensity: MMI X (Extreme)
- Tsunami: 5 m (16 ft)
- Landslides: Yes
- Foreshocks: 41 ≥M_{w}4.0; Strongest: M_{w}6.4
- Aftershocks: 138 ≥M_{w}4.0 (as of 12/31/2002); Strongest: M_{w}6.7
- Casualties: 8 fatalities, 632 injuries

On 10 October 2002, at 19:50:20 WIT (10:50 UTC), a M_{w} 7.5 earthquake struck the Bird's Head Peninsula in West Papua Province, Indonesia, at a depth of 23.6 kilometres (14.7 mi). A strike-slip event triggered by a rupture on the Ransiki Fault, it killed eight people, injured more than 630, and damaged or destroyed more than 2,100 structures in Manokwari, South Manokwari, Arfak Mountains and Wondama Bay Regencies. A large tsunami was also triggered, damaging dozens of homes in Manokwari. The mainshock was preceded by more than 40 foreshocks, including two M_{w}6.0+ events, in addition to nearly 140 strong aftershocks, including a M_{w}6.7 event, being recorded in the region throughout the remainder of 2002.

== Tectonic setting ==
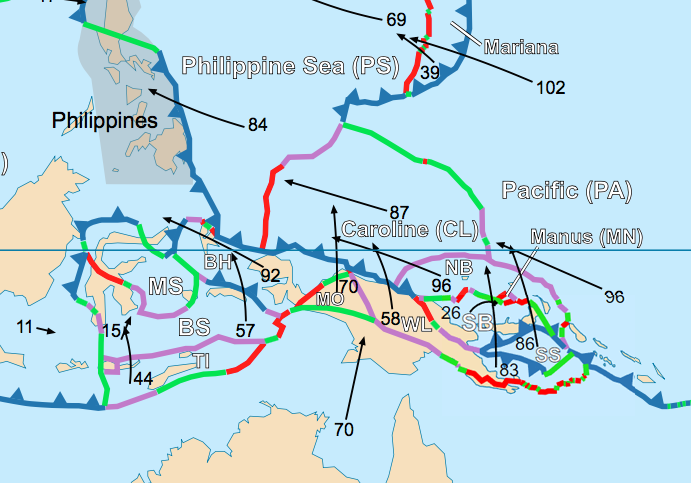
Tectonic map of the New Guinea region with relative plate motion.

New Guinea lies within a very complex tectonic regime surrounded by microplates which accommodate the collision and oblique convergence between the Australian plate and the Pacific plate. In the north, the Caroline plate and North Bismarck plate subduct underneath the Bird's Head plate and the Woodlark plate along the New Guinea Trench. The earthquake occurred at the central portion of the trench. The western portion of New Guinea has parallel subduction zones to the north and south of it along a continuation of the Philippine Trench and a convergent boundary between the Bird's Head plate and the Banda Sea plate. In western central New Guinea, the Maoke plate has multiple boundaries with various plates. At the far eastern portion of the island, the South Bismarck plate interacts with the Woodlark plate, as well as the Solomon Sea plate subducting underneath the Woodlark plate. The largest on-land plate boundary in the region, however, is between the Woodlark plate and the Australian plate. This region of the New Guinea Trench experienced two large earthquakes in 1914 and 1996. Other powerful tremors struck nearby areas in 1944, 1975 and 2009.

== Earthquake ==
Estimated number of people exposed to shaking levels
MMI	Population exposure
MMI X (Extreme)	5k
MMI IX (Violent)	2k
MMI VIII (Severe)	8k
MMI VII (Very strong)	15k
MMI VI (Strong)	168k

Striking at 19:50:20 WIT (10:50:20 UTC), the mainshock magnitude was reported as M_{w} 7.5 by the International Seismological Centre, M_{wc} 7.6 or M_{e} 8.2 by the United States Geological Survey, M_{s} 7.7 by the National Centers for Environmental Information and M_{L} 7.4 by the Ecole et Observatoire des Sciences de la Terre, However, many news sources initially gave the earthquake a magnitude of 6.4. The earthquake's offshore epicenter was located off the southeastern coastline of the Bird's Head Peninsula in West Papua Province. The focal mechanism is consistent with strike-slip faulting on either a left-lateral, northeast-striking fault or a right-lateral, northwest-striking fault. The earthquake rupture occurred on the northwest-trending Ransiki Fault. Rumberpon Island, part of Wondama Bay Regency, was the closest area to the earthquake's epicenter, which was located 7 km (4.3 mi) east of the island's coast. A maximum Modified Mercalli intensity (MMI) of X (Extreme) was estimated, with Manokwari town recording MMI V-VI (Moderate-Strong) shaking, according to ShakeMap parameters. Tremors from the earthquake lasted three minutes.

An intense sequence of foreshocks, 41 of which measured M_{w} 4.0 or higher, preceded the mainshock, starting with a M_{w} 5.1 event on 3 April, with activity in the region rapidly increasing starting in late-August. The two largest foreshocks measured M_{w} 6.0 and M_{w} 6.4 and struck on 20 September, with both events having a maximum MMI of VIII (Severe). After the M_{w} 7.6 mainshock on 10 October, 138 aftershocks measuring M_{w} 4.0 or higher struck by the end of 2002. Despite the mainshock's southwest-northeast trending rupture, a majority of aftershocks occurred up to 270 km (170 mi) south-southeast of the mainshock's epicenter along a northwest-southeast trending area. The largest aftershock, measuring M_{w} 6.7, occurred struck northwest of the mainshock at 12:28 UTC, and had a maximum MMI of VIII.

=== Other effects ===
A large local tsunami was triggered, striking the towns of Oransburi and Ransiki at a height of 3–5 metres (9.8–16.4 ft). In Manokwari, the tsunami was 1 m (3.3 ft) high. Soil liquefaction occurred at coastal areas of Manokwari, Oransbari and Ransiki, and subsidence of 2–3 metres (6.6–9.8 ft) was observed at Oransbari.

== Damage and casualties ==
Eight people were killed and 632 others suffered injuries, of which 172 were seriously hurt. More than 1,900 homes were affected to varying degrees, with over 1,000 collapsing or suffering severe damage and 900 more receiving minor-to-moderate damage, along with 14 mosques, 46 churches, 44 office buildings, 21 schools, 7 halls, 2 markets, 30 km (19 mi) of road, 5 bridges, and 71 other buildings. Nine sub-districts of South Manokwari Regency were affected, with access to them being difficult due to many fallen trees and landslides blocking roads.

Five fatalities and 172 injuries were reported in Ransiki, where 88 homes collapsed and a 3 km (1.9 mi) long surface rupture was observed. Among the dead were two infants crushed by collapsing homes and a man killed by falling debris at a local mosque. At least 230 homes were destroyed and 284 were damaged in Oransburi. On Rumberpon Island, the closest area to the epicenter, one person was seriously injured, many homes were levelled and 1,387 people in 298 families were affected. Two deaths, 10 injuries and 127 collapsed homes were reported in Anggi. In Manokwari, eight homes, two bridges, a church, a mosque and a road were damaged. A subsequent tsunami struck the town and other areas surrounding the Doreri Bay, damaging dozens of homes and submerging areas in seawater up to 30 cm (0.98 ft) deep.

== Response ==
The District Head of Manokwari and a joint team from Satlak PBP Manokwari returned on 13 October from a two-day visit to Rumberpon Island, the closest area to the earthquake epicenter and an affected sub-district of South Manokwari Regency.The team brought five megatons of rice, 50 cartons of instant noodles and sardines, 500 grams of sugar and other foodstuffs to the affected area. The team also delivered 20 tents for temporary shelter. Medicinal assistance was brought in to prevent diarrhea, malaria, and upper-respiratory tract infections. On 15 October, the team delivered the same assistance to Ransiki and Oransbari sub-districts using a naval ship. The Indonesian Red Cross (Palang Merah Indonesia) brought in two people from their central Disaster Management Committee to the PMI Jayapura branch to add to their team of 30 volunteers on site. PMI donated 150 family kits and 150 tarpaulins to displaced families.

The Satlak Coordinator of Manokwari reported on 25 October that the distribution of assistance had been distributed to the victims of the earthquake in 3 of the 9 affected districts. A total of 23 megatons of rice, 6 packs of tea, 1 megaton of sugar, 340 packs of foodstuffs, 234 tents, 50 sacks of cement, and 5 bales of medicine were delivered to Manokwari, Oransbari and Ransiki sub-districts. Even though Indonesia did not request external assistance, the International Federation of Red Cross and Red Crescent Societies (IFRC) issued on 18 October an appeal for US$254,000 to respond to the immediate needs of 4,000 affected families, in particular shelter and household items, as well as shelter rehabilitation needs.

== See also ==
- List of earthquakes in 2002
- List of earthquakes in Indonesia
- List of tsunamis
- 2002 Sandaun earthquake
- 2010 Papua earthquake
