= 2010 Solomon Islands earthquake =

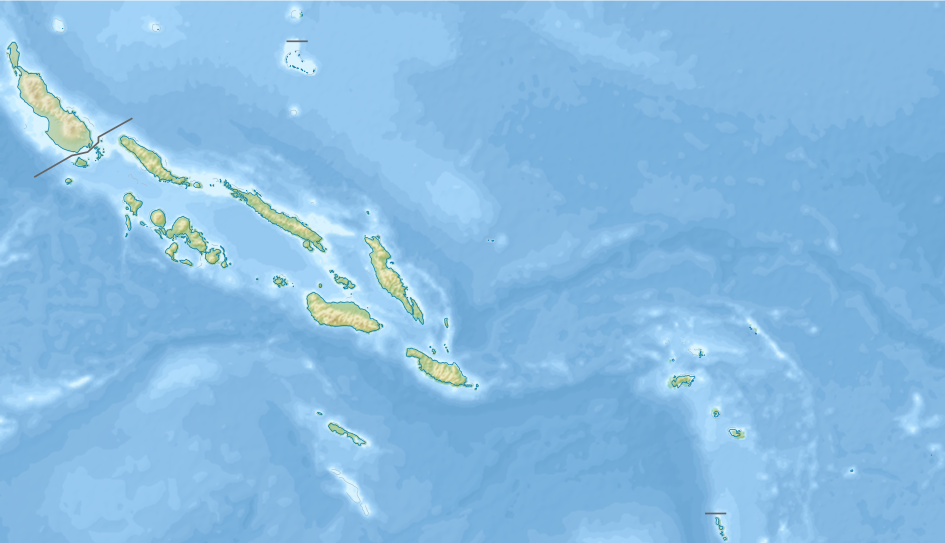
- Location within Oceania Location within Solomon Islands
- UTC time: 2010-01-03 22:36:28
- ISC event: 14287942
- USGS-ANSS: ComCat
- Local date: 4 January 2010
- Local time: 09:36:28
- Duration: 33 seconds
- Magnitude: 7.1 M_{w}
- Depth: 20 km (12 mi)
- Epicenter: 8.87°S 157.44°E
- Type: Thrust
- Areas affected: Solomon Islands
- Max. intensity: MMI VI (Strong)
- Tsunami: 7 m (23 ft)
- Foreshocks: 6.6 M_{w} Jan 3 at 21:48
- Aftershocks: 6.8 M_{w} Jan 5 at 12:15; 6.0 M_{w} Jan 5 at 13:11; 6.2 M_{w} Jan 9 at 05:51
- Casualties: Two injured

The 2010 Solomon Islands earthquake occurred with a moment magnitude of 7.1 on January 3 at 22:36:28 (UTC). A tsunami measuring approximately 10 feet (3.0 meters) affected some parts of the islands, while a maximum run-up height of 23.0 feet (7.0 meters) was recorded. The earthquake was the largest in a series of quakes to strike the Solomon Islands over the preceding days. The 7.1 mainshock was preceded by a 6.6 magnitude foreshock some 48 minutes previous. As many as 1,000 people were left homeless on the island of Rendova after the earthquake and tsunami destroyed approximately 200 homes.

== Earthquake ==
The shock was located 105 km (65 mi) southeast of Gizo, 210 km (130 mi) south west of Dadali, Santa Isabel and 295 km (183 mi) north west of Honiara, Guadalcanal. The earthquake was centered under the sea floor near the town of Gizo, which was heavily damaged in the 2007 Solomon Islands earthquake.

=== Characteristic ===
Analysis of trench deformation, tsunami run-up heights and wave height data from the ocean revealed that the earthquake was a slow-rupturing "tsunami earthquake". Such earthquakes rupture the upper 20 km portion of a subduction zone, while releasing less energy compared to an ordinary subduction zone earthquake.

== Effects ==
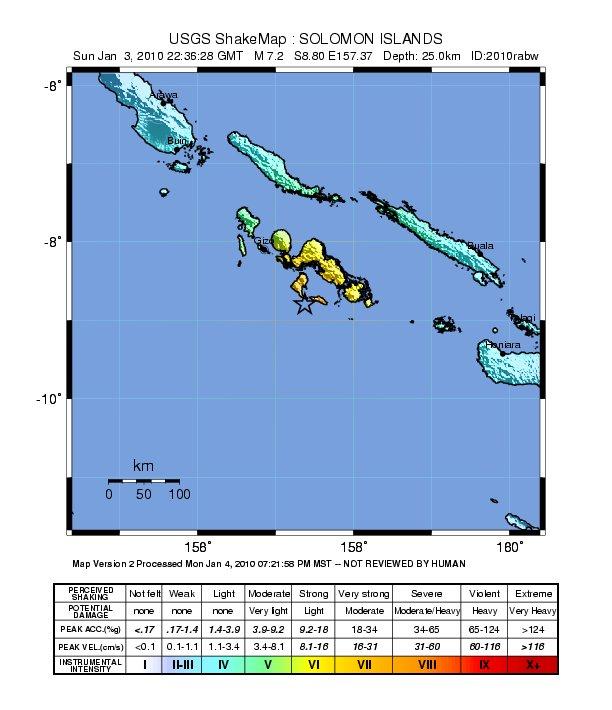
USGS ShakeMap of the Solomon Islands earthquake

Landslides and tsunamis on the islands of Rendova and Tetepare. A tsunami measuring up to 10 feet (3.0 meters) struck Rendova, destroying as many as 200 homes and leaving one-third of Rendova's population homeless. A maximum runup of 7 m (23 ft) was recorded at Rendova Island.

Approximately 1,000 residents have lost their residences, out of the total Rendovan population of just 3,600 people. The village of Retavo, which has a population of approximately 20 people, was hit by a 10-foot tsunami wave. Another village, Baniata, reported that sixteen homes were destroyed and thirty-two were damaged by the earthquake and tsunami. Due to early evacuations, there were no fatalities, but two people sustained minor injuries.

== See also ==
- 2013 Solomon Islands earthquake
- List of earthquakes in 2010
- List of earthquakes in the Solomon Islands archipelago
