= List of earthquakes in the Solomon Islands =

This is a list of earthquakes in the Solomon Islands. Only earthquakes over magnitude 8 are included unless they result in damage and/or casualties. Earthquakes from other regions that were strongly felt in the area are also be included.

== Background ==
The Australian, Woodlark, Solomon Sea, and Pacific plates are converging at a rate of 97 mm/yr. Subduction of the Australian Plate has also given rise to volcanoes in the region. This region of the world lies along the Pacific Ring of Fire, where 90 percent of all earthquake and volcanic activity is concentrated.

Overall, the population in this region resides in structures that are mostly vulnerable to earthquake shaking; predominant vulnerable building types include adobe walls and informal construction.

== List of earthquakes ==
Date	Region	Mag.	MMI	Deaths	Injuries	Damage	Ref
2022-11-22	Guadalcanal	7.0 M_{w}	VII		4	Moderate damage	
2021-10-15	Rendova	6.4 M_{w}	VI		1	Moderate damage	
2016-12-08	Makira	7.8 M_{w}	VIII	1		Major damage/tsunami	
2013-02-06	Nendö	8.0 M_{w}	VIII	14	17	Major damage/tsunami	
2012-07-25	Guadalcanal	6.4 M_{w}	VII			Severe damage	
2010-01-03	Rendova	7.1 M_{w}	VI		Several	Major damage/tsunami	
2007-04-01	Ghizo	8.1 M_{w}	VIII	112		Major damage/tsunami	
1997-04-21	Torba, Vanuatu	7.7 M_{w}	VII			Tsunami caused damage in the Solomon Islands	
1988-08-10	Makira	7.6 M_{w}	VII	1		Tsunami	
1984-02-07	Guadalcanal	7.6 M_{w}	VIII			Minor damage/Landslides	
1983-03-18	New Britain	7.6 M_{w}	VII			Moderate damage/landslides	
1977-04-20	Guadalcanal	6.7 M_{w}	VII	34		Major damage/tsunami	
1977-04-21	Guadalcanal	7.5 M_{w}	VII	18	1	Major damage	
1959-08-17	Rendova	7.0 M_{w}	VI			Major damage	
1939-04-30	Guadalcanal	7.8 M_{w}	VII	12		Moderate damage/tsunami	
1931-10-03	Makira	7.8 M_{w}	VI	50		Major damage/tsunami	

Note: The inclusion criteria for adding events are based on WikiProject Earthquakes' notability guideline that was developed for stand alone articles. The principles described also apply to lists. In summary, only damaging, injurious, or deadly events should be recorded.
