= Sensing Disaster: Local Knowledge and Vulnerability in Oceania =

2023 book by Matthew Lauer

Sensing Disaster
- Cover of the first edition
- Author: Matthew Lauer
- Language: English
- Subject: Environmental anthropology, Anthropology of disaster, Indigenous ecological knowledge, Oceania
- Genre: Non-fiction, ethnography
- Publisher: University of California Press
- Publication date: March 2023
- Publication place: United States
- Media type: Print (hardcover and paperback), e-book
- Pages: 292
- ISBN: 978-0-520-39207-6 (paperback)

Sensing Disaster: Local Knowledge and Vulnerability in Oceania is a 2023 nonfiction book by American anthropologist Matthew Lauer, published by the University of California Press. Based on more than a decade of ethnographic fieldwork, the book examines the 2007 Solomon Islands earthquake and tsunami that struck the island of Simbo and the near-total evacuation of Simbo islanders that preceded it, despite the absence of a formal warning system or living memory of a prior tsunami. Lauer uses the case to argue that conventional scholarly and popular portrayals of "Indigenous ecological knowledge" inadequately explain how Simbo islanders anticipated and responded to the disaster, and he calls for reconceiving such knowledge as a situated, relational practice of "sensing" rather than a fixed, intergenerationally transmitted body of tradition.

== Background ==
Matthew Lauer is a professor and chair of the Department of Anthropology at San Diego State University, where he researches environmental change, Indigenous knowledge, disaster vulnerability, and marine resource management in Oceania. He has conducted fieldwork in the Solomon Islands and French Polynesia for more than two decades. Sensing Disaster draws on over ten years of research on the island of Simbo, including household surveys and ethnographic interviews conducted over eighteen months of residence in the community, examining the aftermath of the 2 April 2007 magnitude-8.1 earthquake and tsunami that struck the western Solomon Islands.

== Synopsis ==
The book opens with a prologue describing the tsunami's arrival on Simbo and proceeds through an introduction and seven chapters that trace the disaster and its aftermath: the history of the concept of Indigenous ecological knowledge; Simbo islanders' embodied "ocean knowing"; the island's settlement history and the movement of ancestral communities inland; the effects of colonization and Christian conversion on village life and vulnerability; the assembling of post-tsunami reconstruction by outside experts and aid agencies; a critical examination of the concept of "vulnerable isles"; and a concluding chapter that develops Lauer's framework of "sensing disaster."

Central to Lauer's argument is the Simbo concept of muolongo, glossed as "sensing, anticipating, interrelating," which he presents as a practice of noticing subtle environmental cues and relating to human and nonhuman others rather than a codified body of traditional knowledge. He argues that this capacity for situated sensing, rather than orally transmitted lore about tsunamis, explains why nearly the entire population of Simbo fled to higher ground before the 2007 waves struck. Lauer also traces how colonization, capitalism, Christian missionization, and post-disaster humanitarian and technoscientific intervention reshaped Simbo social life, ancestral territory, and vulnerability, and he examines local values of kastom (generosity and reciprocity) and varivagana (mutual sharing) as resources that shaped the recovery process.

== Reception ==
Sensing Disaster received reviews in several academic journals. Writing in Oceania, a reviewer called it "an excellent book that offers a sympathetic and sophisticated introduction to the anthropology of disasters and indigenous knowledge and place-making," adding that its arguments were "highly relevant for ... development and disaster practice across Oceania."

In Anthropological Forum, the book was described as "ethnographically and empirically rich, and conceptually compelling," and "a timely contribution" to studies of climate change impacts and Indigenous and traditional ecological knowledge.

Reviewing the book for the American Anthropological Association's Anthropology Book Forum, Sohini Chakraborty called it "a remarkable ethnographic study of Simbo," writing that Lauer "makes a timely and significant contribution towards exhibiting how the embeddedness of cultural practices within the socio-ecological systems explain how differing lifeworlds often coexist simultaneously and engender multiple meanings," and that the book "makes a relevant addition to the field of the Social Construction of Knowledge."

The book was also praised by scholars including Jerry Jacka, Tamatoa Bambridge, and Susanna M. Hoffman, who described it as an important intervention that reconsiders how Indigenous and other forms of local knowledge shape understandings of disaster and vulnerability.

== See also ==
- 2007 Solomon Islands earthquake
- Traditional ecological knowledge
- Anthropology of disaster
