= 2010 Oaxaca earthquake =

Earthquake in Mexico

- Location within Mexico
- UTC time: 2010-06-30 07:22:28
- ISC event: 14791433
- USGS-ANSS: ComCat
- Local date: 30 June 2010
- Local time: 02:22:28 a.m.
- Magnitude: 6.3 M_{w}^{(GCMT)}
- Depth: 27.8 km (17 mi)
- Epicenter: 16.527°N 97.760°W
- Areas affected: Mexico
- Max. intensity: MMI VII (Very strong)
- Casualties: 1 dead

The 2010 Oaxaca earthquake struck Oaxaca, Mexico on June 30, 2010, with an M_{w} magnitude of 6.3. Many people in different cities left their beds and ran into the street, as the quake struck at 2:22 am.

== Impact ==
Helicopters and police vehicles were sent to inspect possible damage in Mexico City, primarily in downtown and central areas, where some buildings were evacuated. Many boroughs reported power outages as a result of the earthquake, namely Azcapotzalco, Iztapalapa, and Benito Juárez. Additionally, damages to structures and infrastructure were reported throughout the city. One person died in San Andrés Huaxpaltepec, Oaxaca. Many of the houses were damaged and slanted due to the earthquake. The buildings that suffered the most were those that were more than 1 story houses or buildings. The reason for that is because a lot of them came down affecting things around it.

== Tectonic setting ==
Tectonic plates are large shaped pieces of the Earth's crust. With this said, the tectonic setting of Oaxaca, Mexico is located in a region where the Cocos and North America plates converge. It is close to the Tehuantepec zone. Earthquakes tend to occur as a shallow dipping fault plane typical in subduction regions. As for the geology of Oaxaca, Mexico rocks are large and often referred to granodiorite.

== Aftermath ==
A little after the earthquake, there was DF police from la Ciudad de Mexico in certain areas. In several areas the power was out due to the earthquake. Police would do what they could when arrived to the effected areas mentioned above. There was about 5 police helicopters that arrived from la Ciudad de Mexico and helped who they could in the streets. Overall, the press did not address that there were many people affected by this earthquake.

== Aftershocks ==
There were 2 aftershocks reported, both of them at 3.9 magnitude.

== See also ==
- List of earthquakes in 2010
- List of earthquakes in Mexico
- Hurricane Alex (2010)
