= 2010 Mindanao earthquakes =

Series of deep focus earthquakes affecting Mindanao, Philippines

- UTC time: Triplet earthquake: A: 2010-07-23 22:08:11; B: 2010-07-23 22:51:12; C: 2010-07-23 23:15:08
- ISC event: A: 15008002; B: 17178792; C: 15640291; D: 15009694; E: 600183837
- USGS-ANSS: A: ComCat; B: ComCat; C: ComCat; D: ComCat; E: ComCat
- Local date: July 24, 2010
- Local time
- Magnitude: A: M_{wc} 7.3mb 6.4; B: M_{wc} 7.5 M_{w} 7.7, mb 6.8; C: M_{wc} 7.5 M_{w} 7.4, mb 6.8; D: M_{wc} 6.6 mb 6.0; E: M_{wc} 6.6
- Depth: A: 610 km B: 585 km C: 634 km D: 565 km E: 618 km
- Epicenter: 6.497°N 123.480°E
- Areas affected: Moro Gulf, Philippines
- Max. intensity: PEIS IV (MMI III)
- Aftershocks: D: 2010-07-24 05:35:01; E: 2010-07-29 07:31:56

The 2010 Mindanao earthquakes occurred in the southern Philippines in the Moro Gulf. This was a complex sequence of events including three main events (a triplet earthquake) of M_{w} magnitude 7.3 or greater on the 23rd of July, and two significant aftershocks of magnitude 6.6 on the 24th and 29th. All of these were deep focus earthquakes, at depths from 565 km (351 mi) to 634 km (394 mi). This resulted in minimal, but very widespread shaking at the surface, with a maximum intensity of IV (Moderately strong) on the PEIS scale; consequently there were no reports of casualties or damage.

== Tectonic summary ==
The southern part of the Philippines lies above the complex collisional zone between the Philippine Sea plate and the Sunda plate. The convergence between these two plates of between 6–11 cm per year is accommodated by a series of smaller plates. One of these, the Molucca Sea plate, is currently being subducted beneath both the Philippine Sea plate and the Sangihe microplate, causing it to have an inverted U-shape seismic zone. The earthquakes were caused by the continuing distortion of the Molucca Sea plate. These three quakes of similar magnitude occurring in such close proximity of each other location-wise and time-wise can be regarded as an example of a triplet earthquake.

== Areas affected ==
These earthquakes occurred in Moro Gulf, off the island of Mindanao. The M_{w} 7.6 earthquake were felt in Philippines, Taiwan, and Malaysia. The M_{w} 7.4 earthquake were felt in Philippines, Brunei, Malaysia, and Indonesia.

== See also ==
- List of earthquakes in 2010
- List of earthquakes in the Philippines
