= July 2010 Iran earthquake =

Earthquake in Razavi Khorasan province, Iran

- Location within Iran
- UTC time: 2010-07-30 13:50:12
- ISC event: n/a
- USGS-ANSS: ComCat
- Local date: July 30, 2010
- Magnitude: 5.6 m_{N}
- Depth: 26.1 kilometres (16.2 mi)
- Epicenter: 35.225°N 59.271°E
- Areas affected: Iran
- Max. intensity: MMI VI (Strong)
- Casualties: 150–274 injured

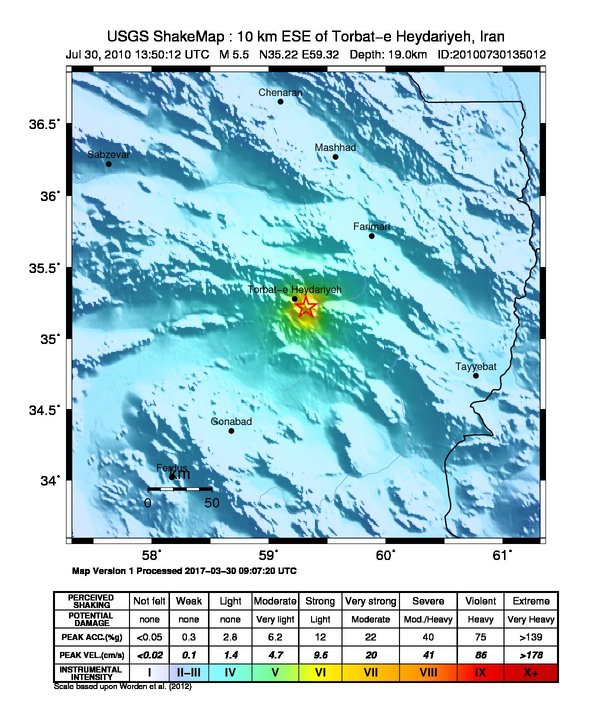
USGS ShakeMap of Torbat-e Heydariyeh, Iran (July 30th 2010)

On July 30, 2010, a 5.6 magnitude earthquake occurred in Razavi Khorasan province, Iran.

== Casualties ==
Iranian media reported at least 170 people were injured as a result of the earthquake, while the Iranian Red Crescent Society reported more than 150 injured. The organization said all injured were treated on the scene, except two people who were hospitalized in Mashhad.

== Damage ==
The earthquake reportedly caused serious damage in dozens of villages. Widespread outages were also reported.

== See also ==
- List of earthquakes in 2010
- List of earthquakes in Iran
