= List of earthquakes in 2010 =

Earthquakes in 2010
Approximate epicenters of notable earthquakes in 2010
- 4.0–5.9 magnitude
- 6.0–6.9 magnitude
- 7.0–7.9 magnitude
- 8.0+ magnitude
- Strongest: 8.8 M_{w} Chile
- Deadliest: 7.0 M_{w} (Haiti) Haiti; 160,000 deaths
- Total fatalities: 164,627

Number by magnitude
- 9.0+: 0
- 8.0–8.9: 1
- 7.0–7.9: 21
- 6.0–6.9: 150
- 5.0–5.9: 2210

Earthquakes in 2010 resulted in nearly 165,000 fatalities. Most of these were due to the 2010 Haiti earthquake, which caused an estimated 160,000 deaths, making it the 8th deadliest earthquake in recorded history. Other deadly quakes occurred in China, Indonesia, and Turkey. The 2010 Chile earthquake registered 8.8 on the moment magnitude scale, ranking it as the 6th strongest earthquake since 1900. The tsunami associated with the Chile earthquake caused tsunami advisories and warning across the entire Pacific Ocean rim, also known as the Ring of Fire.

== Compared to other years ==
Number of earthquakes worldwide for 2000–2010 []
Magnitude	2000	2001	2002	2003	2004	2005	2006	2007	2008	2009	2010
8.0–9.9	1	1	0	1	2	1	2	4	1	1	1
7.0–7.9	15	14	13	14	14	10	9	14	12	16	23
6.0–6.9	145	122	126	139	141	139	142	178	167	143	150
5.0–5.9	1,334	1,212	1,170	1,212	1,511	1,694	1,726	2,090	1,786	1,912	2,222
4.0–4.9	7,968	7,969	8,479	8,455	10,880	13,893	12,843	12,081	12,294	6,817	10,135
Total	9,462	9,319	9,788	9,823	12,551	15,738	14,723	14,367	14,261	8,891	12,536

== Overall ==
=== By death toll ===
Rank	Death toll	Magnitude	Location	MMI	Depth (km)	Date
1	160,000	7.0	Haiti, Ouest	X (Extreme)	13.0	January 12
2	2,968	6.9	China, Qinghai	X (Extreme)	17.0	April 14
3	525	8.8	Chile, Maule	IX (Violent)	35.0	February 27
4	408	7.8	Indonesia, Sumatra	V (Moderate)	20.6	October 25
5	58	6.1	Turkey. Elazığ	VI (Strong)	10.0	March 8
6	17	7.0	Indonesia, Papua	VII (Very strong)	15.0	June 16
7	11	5.6	Afghanistan, Balkh	V (Moderate)	13.0	April 18

- Note: At least 10 dead

=== By magnitude ===
Rank	Magnitude	Death toll	Location	Date
1	8.8	525	Chile	February 27
2	7.8	0	Indonesia	April 6
3	7.8	408	Indonesia	October 25
4	7.6	0	Philippines	July 24
5	7.5	0	India	June 13
5	7.5	0	Vanuatu	August 10
7	7.4	0	Philippines	July 24
7	7.4	0	Japan	December 21
9	7.3	0	Papua New Guinea	July 18
9	7.3	0	Philippines	July 24
9	7.3	0	Vanuatu	December 25
12	7.2	4	Mexico	April 4
12	7.2	0	Vanuatu	May 27
12	7.2	0	Indonesia	September 29
16	7.1	0	Solomon Islands	January 3
16	7.1	1	Ecuador	August 12
18	7.0	2	New Zealand	September 4
19	7.0	160,000	Léogâne, Haiti	January 12
18	7.0	0	Japan	February 26
18	7.0	18	Indonesia	June 16
19	7.0	0	Papua New Guinea	August 4

- Note: At least 7.0 magnitude

== By month ==
=== January ===
January
- Strongest: 7.1 M_{w}, Solomon Islands
- Deadliest: 7.0 M_{w} Haiti; 160,000 deaths
- Total fatalities: 160,010

Number by magnitude
- 9.0+: 0
- 8.0–8.9: 0
- 7.0–7.9: 2
- 6.0–6.9: 9
- 5.0–5.9: 193
- 4.0–4.9: 618

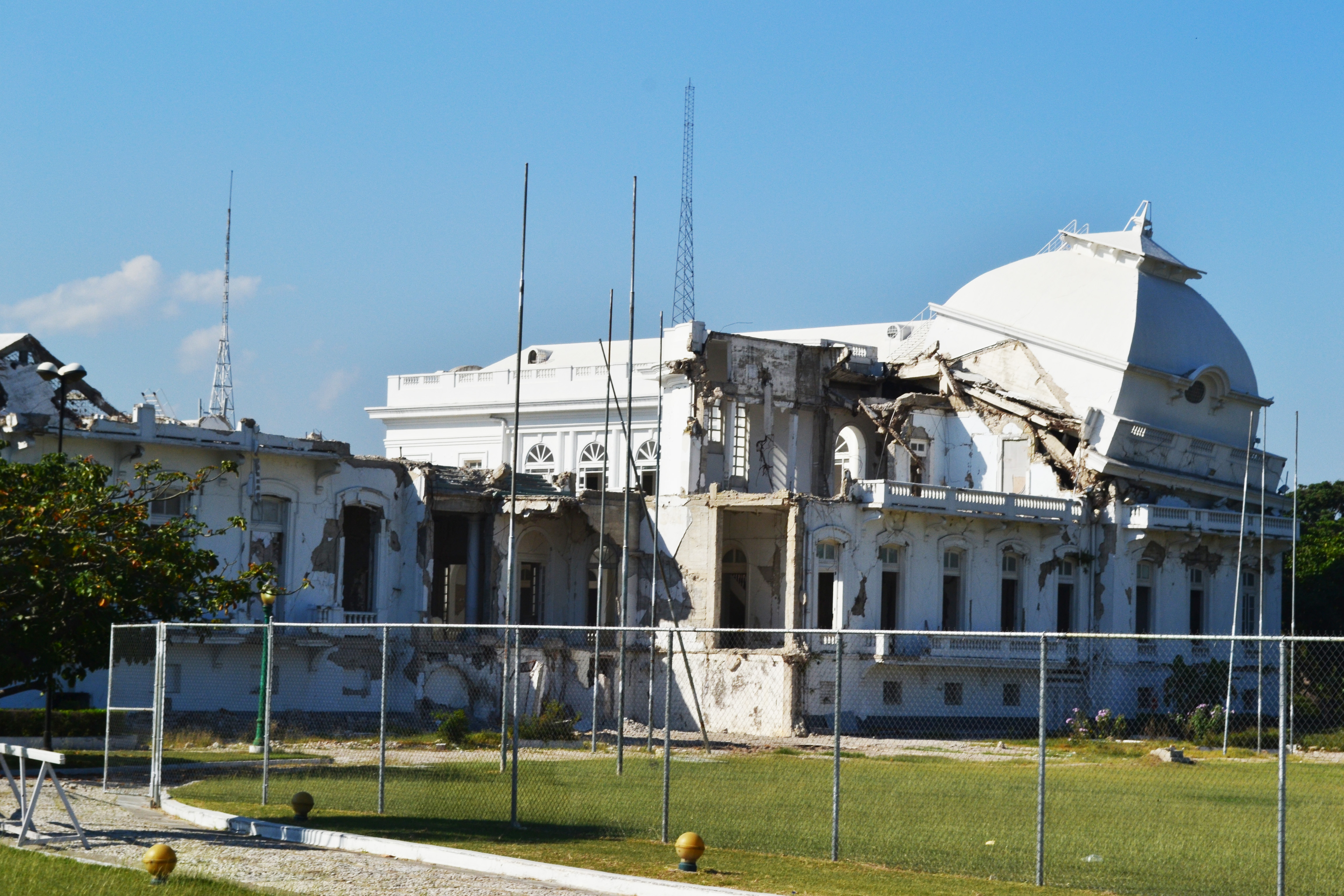
The heavily damaged National Palace of Haiti after the earthquake.

Date	Country and location	M_{w}	Depth (km)	MMI	Notes	Casualties	
Date	Country and location	M_{w}	Depth (km)	MMI	Notes	Dead	Injured
2	Tajikistan, Gorno-Badakhshan, 84 km N of Khorog	5.4	47.0	IV	At least 98 homes destroyed, 902 others damaged and 20,000 displaced in the epicentral area.	–	–
2	Northern Mariana Islands offshore	6.1	8.0	–	–	–	–
3	Solomon Islands, Western offshore, 98 km SE of Gizo	6.6	10.0	VII	Foreshock of the 7.1 event later that day.	–	–
3	Solomon Islands, Western offshore, 94 km SE of Gizo	7.1	10.0	VI	Further information: 2010 Solomon Islands earthquake	–	2
5	South Georgia and the South Sandwich Islands, east of the South Sandwich Islands	6.8	13.0	–	–	–	–
5	Solomon Islands, Western offshore, 127 km SE of Gizo	6.8	15.4	VII	Aftershocks of the January 3 event.	–	–
5	Solomon Islands, 155 km SE of Gizo	6.0	35.0	V	Aftershocks of the January 3 event.	–	–
9	Solomon Islands, 142 km SE of Gizo	6.2	12.0	V	Aftershocks of the January 3 event.	–	–
9	United States, California offshore, 35 km WNW of Ferndale	6.5	29.3	VII	Further information: 2010 Eureka earthquake	–	24
10	Indonesia, Java, 66 km SSW of Singaparna	5.1	65.2	IV	–	1	–
12	Haiti, Ouest, 10 km SE of Léogâne	7.0	13.0	X	The 2010 Haiti earthquake was one of the deadliest earthquakes in recorded history.	100,000 to 316,000	–
12	Haiti, Ouest, 4 km E of Grand-Goâve	6.0	10.0	VII	Aftershock of the January 12 event. It occurred seven minutes after the main shock.	–	–
17	China, Guizhou, 77 km S of Anshun	4.4	26.6	IV	–	8	–
17	Drake Passage	6.3	5.0	II	–	–	–
30	China, eastern Sichuan	5.1	10.0	VI	Nearly 5,000 houses and a local dam damaged, 2,000 displaced, one fatality and 13 injuries.	1	13

=== February ===
February
- Strongest: 8.8 M_{w} Chile
- Deadliest: 8.8 M_{w} Chile; 525 deaths
- Total fatalities: 527

Number by magnitude
- 9.0+: 0
- 8.0–8.9: 1
- 7.0–7.9: 2
- 6.0–6.9: 20
- 5.0–5.9: 279
- 4.0–4.9: 878

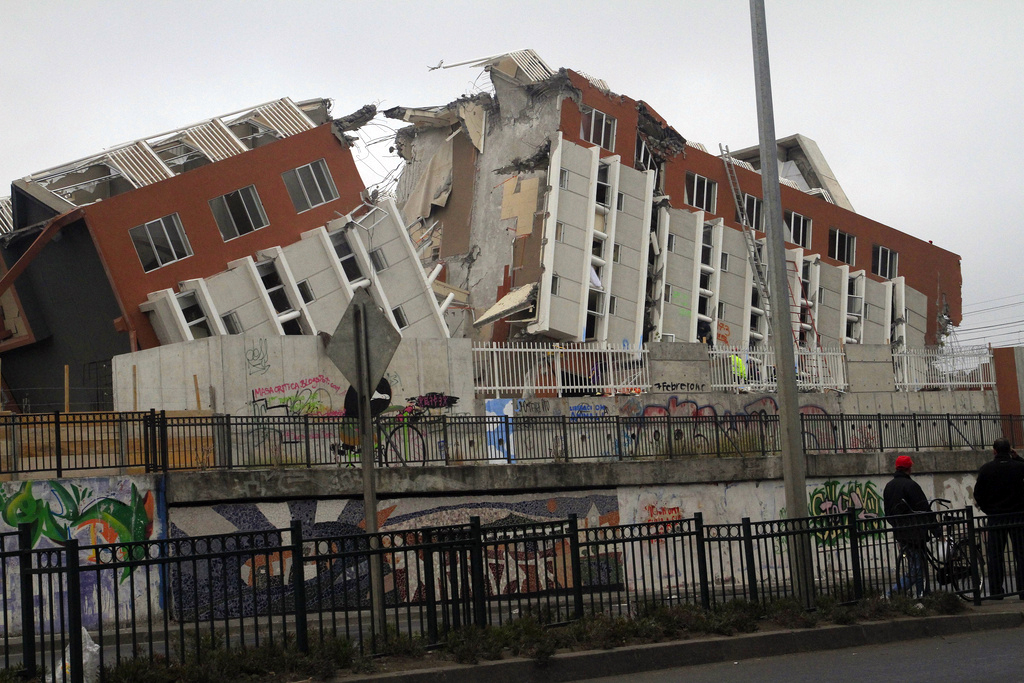
Damage sustained by a building in Concepción, Chile.

Date	Country and location	M_{w}	Depth (km)	MMI	Notes	Casualties	
Date	Country and location	M_{w}	Depth (km)	MMI	Notes	Dead	Injured
1	Papua New Guinea, Bougainville Island, 115 km WNW of Panguna	6.2	32.0	V	–	–	–
5	(Antarctica) Southeast Indian Ridge	6.2	1.0	–	–	–	–
6	Russia, Kuril Islands	6.0	30.0	–	–	–	–
7	Japan, Okinawa, 109 km SSW of Ishigaki	6.3	21.0	IV	–	–	–
9	Tonga, Niuatoputapu, 104 km NNE of Hihifo	6.1	10.0	III	–	–	–
13	Tonga, 'Eua, 65 km NNE of 'Ohonua	6.1	11.0	–	–	–	–
15	East Timor, 238 km NE of Lospalos	6.2	126.0	IV	–	–	–
18	Russia, Primorsky Krai, 15 km SSW of Kraskino	6.9	577.7	–	This earthquake struck near Russia's border with China and North Korea.	–	–
22	Tonga, 'Eua, 277 km SSW of 'Ohonua	6.0	15.0	–	–	–	–
26	Japan, Okinawa, 70 km SE of Haebaru	7.0	25.0	VI	This earthquake caused some damage and two injuries. A tsunami warning was issued for the Okinawa prefecture.	-	2
27	Chile, Ñuble Region, Itata Province, 36 km WNW of Quirihue	8.8	22.9	VIII	The 2010 Chile earthquake was the largest event of 2010, and the most significant earthquake to impact Chile since the 1960 Valdivia earthquake. It had a robust aftershock sequence, and tsunami warnings were issued in 53 countries. 350 of the 525 deaths that were attributed to this earthquake were caused by a tsunami wave of approximately 24.1 m (79 ft) that struck the coastal town of Constitución.	525	–
27	Argentina, Salta Province, 5 km NE of Campo Quijano	6.3	10.0	V	The 2010 Salta earthquake was once thought to be an aftershock of the 8.8 event, but it was later deemed to be a separate event.	2	Dozens

- Note: Eleven aftershocks with magnitudes of 6.0 or higher were recorded in February following the magnitude 8.8 earthquake that struck Chile on February 27. In order to eliminate cluttering, the February aftershocks have not been included.

=== March ===
March
- Strongest: 7.0 M_{w} Chile
- Deadliest: 6.1 M_{w} Turkey; 42–57 deaths
- Total fatalities: 43–58

Number by magnitude
- 9.0+: 0
- 8.0–8.9: 0
- 7.0–7.9: 1
- 6.0–6.9: 22
- 5.0–5.9: 264
- 4.0–4.9: 1,262

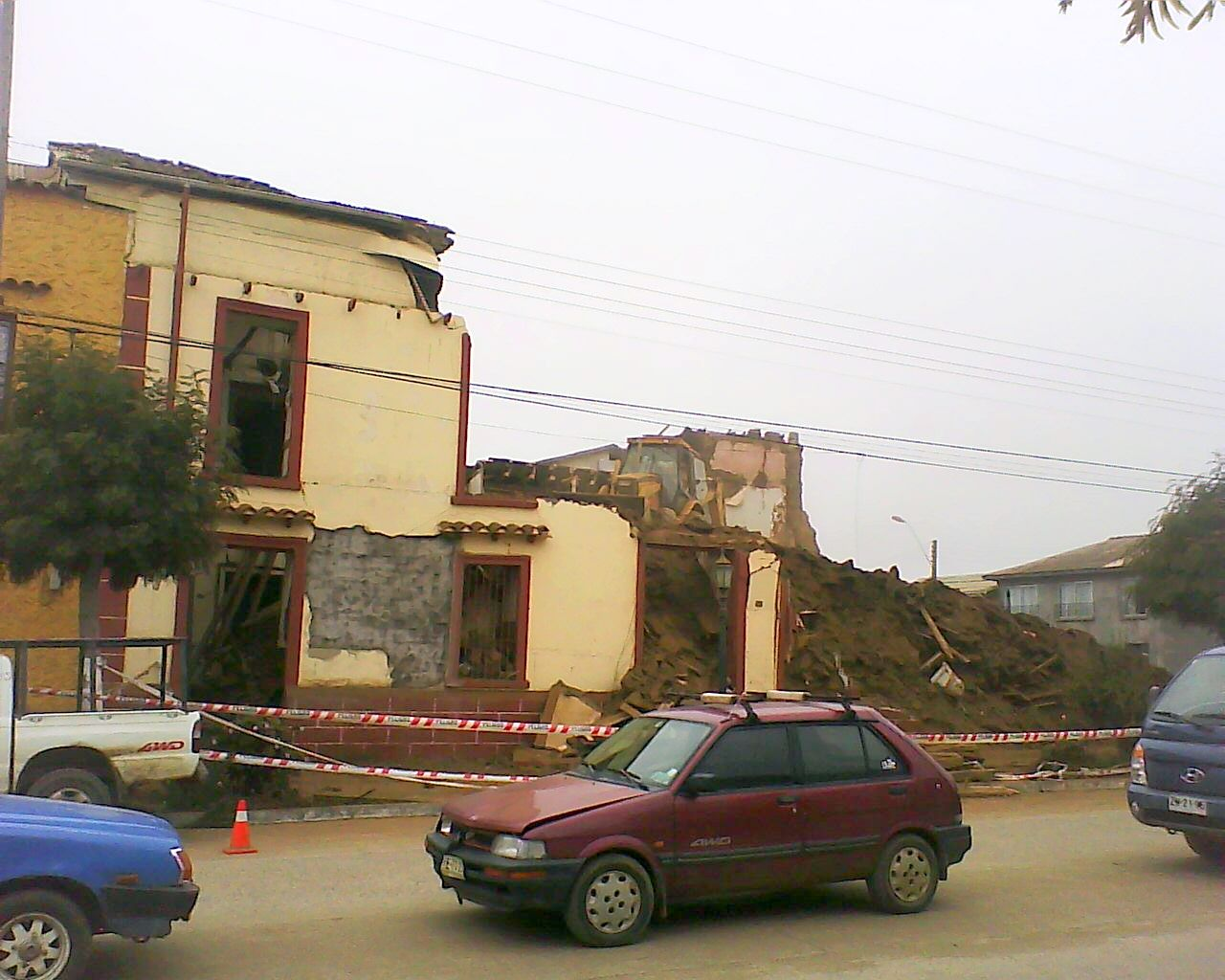
The Pichilemu post-office building in Chile was severely damaged by the earthquakes.

Date	Country and location	M_{w}	Depth (km)	MMI	Notes	Casualties	
Date	Country and location	M_{w}	Depth (km)	MMI	Notes	Dead	Injured
3	Chile, Biobío Region, 25 km WNW of Talcahuano	6.1	20.0	VII	Aftershock of the 8.8 event on February 27	–	–
4	Taiwan, Tainan, 41 km SE of Yujing District	6.3	21.0	VI	The 2010 Kaohsiung earthquake caused minor damage and over 90 injuries.	–	90+
4	Chile, Valparaíso Region, 50 km WSW of Valparaíso	6.0	24.2	V	Aftershock of the 8.8 earthquake on February 27	–	–
4	Vanuatu, Torba Province, 48 km NW of Sola	6.5	176.0	IV		–	–
4	Chile, Antofagasta Region, 66 km ENE of Calama	6.3	114.0	IV	–	–	–
5	Chile, Biobío Region, 14 km NW of Talcahuano	6.1	29.9	V	Aftershock of the 8.8 event on February 27	–	–
5	Chile, Biobío Region, 23 km WNW of Talcahuano	6.6	18.0	VII	Aftershock of the 8.8 event on February 27	–	–
5	Indonesia, Bengkulu, 141 km W of Bengkulu	6.8	26.0	IV	–	–	–
7	(Antarctica) southern East Pacific Rise	6.3	18.0	–	–	–	–
8	Turkey, Erzurum Province, 10 km SSW of Karaçoban	6.1	12.0	VI	2010 Elazığ earthquake	42–57	74
8	Northern Mariana Islands, Maug Islands region	6.1	427.0	–	–	–	–
11	Chile, O'Higgins Region, 61 km NW of Santa Cruz	6.9	11.0	VII	The 2010 Pichilemu earthquakes are likely aftershocks of the 8.8 event on February 27. Both of them occurred within sixteen minutes of each other. The first earthquake occurred minutes before Sebastián Piñera was sworn in as President of Chile. One person died of a heart attack in Talca, Maule Region.	1	-
11	Chile, O'Higgins Region, 52 km NW of Santa Cruz	7.0	18.0	VII	The 2010 Pichilemu earthquakes are likely aftershocks of the 8.8 event on February 27. Both of them occurred within sixteen minutes of each other. The first earthquake occurred minutes before Sebastián Piñera was sworn in as President of Chile. One person died of a heart attack in Talca, Maule Region.	1	-
11	Chile, O'Higgins Region, 61 km WNW of Santa Cruz	6.0	31.5	VI	Aftershock of the 2010 Pichilemu earthquakes that occurred eleven minutes after the 7.0 event	–	–
14	Indonesia, Seram, 202 km NNW of Amahai	6.4	53.0	V	–	–	–
14	Japan, Fukushima Prefecture, 592 km ENE of Namie	6.5	32.0	VI	–	–	–
15	Chile, Ñuble Region, 76 km NW of Quirihue	6.2	14.0	IV	Aftershock of the 8.8 earthquake on February 27	–	–
16	Chile, Biobío Region, 52 km NNW of Tomé	6.7	18.0	V	Aftershock of the 8.8 earthquake on February 27	–	–
20	Papua New Guinea, New Ireland Province	6.6	414.6	–	–	–	–
25	Philippines, Occidental Mindoro, 2 km SW of Lubang	6.0	16.6	V	–	–	–
26	Chile, Atacama Region, 69 km N of Vallenar	6.3	42.0	V	–	–	–
28	Chile, Maule Region, 88 km W of Constitución	6.0	29.9	IV	Aftershock of the 8.8 earthquake on February 27	–	–
30	India, Andaman and Nicobar Islands, 217 km N of Bombooflat	6.6	30.9	VI	–	–	–

=== April ===
April
- Strongest: 7.8 M_{w}, Indonesia
- Deadliest: 6.9 M_{w}, China; 2,698 deaths
- Total fatalities: 2,713

Number by magnitude
- 9.0+: 0
- 8.0–8.9: 0
- 7.0–7.9: 2
- 6.0–6.9: 15
- 5.0–5.9: 133
- 4.0–4.9: 750

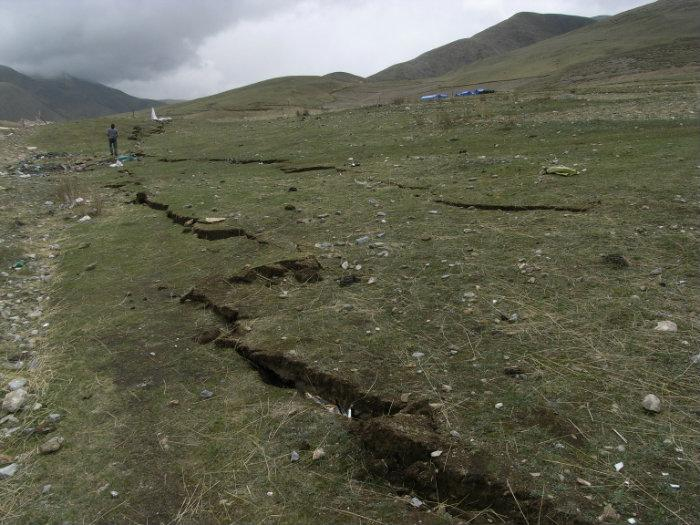
Earthquake cleft in the grassland in China.

Date	Country and location	M_{w}	Depth (km)	MMI	Notes	Casualties	
Date	Country and location	M_{w}	Depth (km)	MMI	Notes	Dead	Injured
2	Chile, Ñuble Region, 25 km WNW of Quirihue	6.0	24.0	VI	Aftershock of the 8.8 earthquake on February 27	–	–
4	Mexico, Baja California, 25 km S of Guadalupe Victoria	7.2	10.0	IX	35,000 people lost their homes in the 2010 Baja California earthquake.	4	254+
5	Indonesia, Minahasa Regency, 164 km S of Tondano	6.2	25.0	–	–	–	–
6	Indonesia, Karo Regency, 75 km E of Mount Sinabung	7.8	31.0	VII	2010 Banyak Islands earthquake	0	62
7	Papua New Guinea, Sandaun Province, 82 km SSW of Aitape	6.0	23.0	VI	–	–	–
10	Tonga, 155 km NW of Nukuʻalofa	6.0	273.2	–	–	–	–
11	Solomon Islands, Makira-Ulawa Province, 99 km WSW of Kirakira	6.9	21.0	V	–	–	–
11	Spain, Granada, 1 km S of Nigüelas	6.3	609.8	III	–	–	–
13	China, Tibet Autonomous Region, 233 km NNW of Chamdo	6.9	17.8	IX	2010 Yushu earthquake	2,698	12,135
14	China, Tibet Autonomous Region, 239 km NNW of Chamdo	6.1	7.6	VII	Largest aftershock of the 2010 Yushu earthquake. It occurred one hour and thirty-six minutes after the main shock.	–	–
17	Papua New Guinea, Morobe Province, 33 km E of Lae	6.2	53.0	VI	–	–	–
18	Afghanistan, Balkh Province, 130 km SSE of Mazar-i-Sharif	5.6	13.0	VI	More than 2,000 houses were destroyed in the 2010 Afghanistan earthquake.	11	70+
21	Tonga, Niuatoputapu, 97 km NE of Hihifo	6.1	35.0	IV	–	–	–
23	Chile, Biobío Region, 26 km W of Nacimiento	6.0	32.0	VI	Aftershock of the 8.8 quake on February 27	–	–
24	Indonesia, Maluku, 181 km NNW of Amahai	6.0	27.0	V	–	–	–
26	Japan offshore, Okinawa Prefecture, 245 km SSW of Ishigaki	6.5	22.0	IV	–	–	–
30	United States, Bering Sea	6.5	12.0	–	Doublet event. The two earthquakes occurred nearly five minutes apart.	–	–
30	United States, Bering Sea	6.3	14.9	–	Doublet event. The two earthquakes occurred nearly five minutes apart.	–	–

=== May ===
May
- Strongest: 7.2 M_{w} (Vanuatu)
- Deadliest: 5.3 M_{w} (Algeria); 2 deaths
- Total fatalities: 2

Number by magnitude
- 9.0+: 0
- 8.0–8.9: 0
- 7.0–7.9: 2
- 6.0–6.9: 14
- 5.0–5.9: 125
- 4.0–4.9: 693

Date	Country and location	M_{w}	Depth (km)	MMI	Notes	Casualties	
Date	Country and location	M_{w}	Depth (km)	MMI	Notes	Dead	Injured
3	Japan offshore, Izu Islands	6.1	84.0	–	–	–	–
3	Chile, Biobío Region, 30 km S of Cañete	6.3	19.0	VII	Aftershock of the 8.8 event on February 27	–	–
5	Indonesia, Bengkulu, 132 km W of Bengkulu	6.5	27.0	V	–	–	–
6	Peru, Tacna Region, 32 km WSW of Tacna	6.2	37.0	VI	–	–	–
14	Algeria, M'Sila, 38 km W of Sidi Aïssa	5.3	2.0	VI	This is the first and largest of three events of the 2010 Beni-Ilmane earthquakes that occurred from May 13 to May 23.	2	43
19	(Antarctica) Pacific-Antarctic Ridge	6.0	10.0	–	Doublet; the two earthquakes occurred twenty-one minutes apart.	–	–
19	(Antarctica) Pacific-Antarctic Ridge	6.0	10.0	–	Doublet; the two earthquakes occurred twenty-one minutes apart.	–	–
23	Peru, Department of Ayacucho, 4 km WNW of Sacsamarca	6.1	101.4	V	–	–	–
24	Brazil, Acre, 87 km W of Tarauacá	6.5	581.2	VI	–	–	–
25	(Antarctica) Mid-Atlantic Ridge	6.3	10.0	–	–	–	–
26	Japan offshore, Okinawa, 216 km ESE of Uruma	6.5	10.0	IV	–	–	–
27	Vanuatu, Torba Province, 100 km WNW of Sola, Vanuatu	7.2	31.0	VI	–	–	–
27	Vanuatu, Torba Province, 90 km WNW of Sola	6.1	35.0	V	Aftershock. It occurred three hours and thirty-four minutes after the main shock.	–	–
31	Philippines, Bangsamoro, 38 km WNW of Cotabato City	6.0	20.0	VI	–	–	–
31	India, Andaman and Nicobar Islands, 98 km SE of Port Blair	6.5	112.0	V	–	–	–

=== June ===
June
- Strongest: 7.5 M_{w}, Nicobar Islands, India
- Total fatalities: 18

Number by magnitude
- 7.0–7.9: 2
- 6.0–6.9: 10
- 5.0–5.9: 125

- A magnitude 6.0 earthquake struck Costa Rica on June 1.
- A magnitude 6.0 earthquake struck Vanuatu on June 9.
- A magnitude 7.5 earthquake struck the Nicobar Islands, India on June 12.
- A magnitude 6.2 earthquake struck the coast Papua, Indonesia on June 16.
- A magnitude 7.0 earthquake struck the coast near Papua, Indonesia on June 16, killing 17 and damaging hundreds of homes.
- A magnitude 6.6 earthquake struck the coast near Papua, Indonesia on June 16.
- (New Zealand) A magnitude 6.0 earthquake struck 135 miles SSW of L'Esperance Rock, Kermadec Islands on June 17.
- (Japan) A magnitude 6.2 earthquake struck the Kuril Islands on June 18.
- A magnitude 5.0 earthquake struck Quebec, Canada on June 23.
- A magnitude 6.1 earthquake struck the New Britain region of Papua New Guinea on June 24.
- A magnitude 6.7 earthquake struck the Solomon Islands on June 26.
- A magnitude 6.4 earthquake struck south of Fiji on June 30.
- A magnitude 6.2 earthquake struck Oaxaca, Mexico, on June 30, killing one person.

=== July ===
July
- Strongest: 7.6 M_{w}, Philippines
- Total fatalities: 1

Number by magnitude
- 7.0–7.9: 4
- 6.0–6.9: 15
- 5.0–5.9: 136

- A magnitude 6.3 earthquake struck in the Vanuatu region on July 2.
- (Japan) A magnitude 6.3 earthquake struck near the east coast of Honshu on July 4.
- (Northern Mariana Islands) A magnitude 6.3 earthquake struck south of the Mariana Islands on July 10.
- A magnitude 6.3 earthquake struck Calama, Chile on July 12.
- A magnitude 6.5 earthquake struck Bío Bío, Chile on July 14.
- A magnitude 6.7 earthquake struck the Fox Islands, Alaska on July 18.
- A magnitude 6.9 earthquake struck the New Britain Region, Papua New Guinea on July 18.
- A magnitude 7.3 earthquake struck the New Britain Region, Papua New Guinea on July 18.
- A magnitude 6.0 earthquake struck the Fox Islands, Alaska on July 18.
- A magnitude 5.8 earthquake struck Southern Iran on July 20, killing 1 person.
- A magnitude 6.3 earthquake struck the New Britain Region, Papua New Guinea on July 20.
- A magnitude 6.1 earthquake struck Indonesia on July 21.
- A magnitude 6.1 earthquake struck Vanuatu, on July 22.
- A magnitude 7.3 earthquake struck Mindanao, Philippines on July 23.
- A magnitude 7.6 earthquake struck Mindanao, Philippines on July 23.
- A magnitude 7.4 earthquake struck Mindanao, Philippines on July 23.
- A magnitude 6.5 earthquake struck Mindanao, Philippines on July 24.
- A magnitude 6.6 earthquake struck Mindanao, Philippines on July 29.
- A magnitude 6.3 earthquake struck off the coast of Kamchatka, Russia on July 30.
- A magnitude 5.6 earthquake struck Northeastern Iran on July 30.

=== August ===
August
- Strongest: 7.3 M_{w}, Vanuatu
- Total fatalities: 3

Number by magnitude
- 7.0–7.9: 3
- 6.0–6.9: 15
- 5.0–5.9: 133

- (Indonesia) A magnitude 6.3 earthquake struck the Molucca Sea on August 3.
- A magnitude 6.0 earthquake struck Tonga on August 4.
- A magnitude 6.5 earthquake struck Papua New Guinea on August 4.
- A magnitude 6.4 earthquake struck the Aleutian Islands, Alaska on August 4.
- A magnitude 7.0 earthquake struck New Britain, Papua New Guinea on August 4.
- (Russia) A magnitude 6.0 earthquake struck the Kuril Islands on August 4.
- A magnitude 7.3 earthquake struck Vanuatu on August 10.
- A magnitude 7.1 earthquake struck Pastaza Province in Ecuador on August 12.
- (Northern Mariana Islands) A magnitude 6.9 earthquake struck the Mariana Islands on August 13.
- (Northern Mariana Islands) A magnitude 6.2 earthquake struck the Mariana Islands on August 14.
- (Northern Mariana Islands) A magnitude 6.6 earthquake struck the Mariana Islands on August 14.
- A magnitude 6.3 earthquake struck New Britain, Papua New Guinea on August 15.
- (Mauritius) A magnitude 6.3 earthquake struck Réunion on August 16.
- A magnitude 6.2 earthquake struck the Fiji on August 16.
- (Northern Mariana Islands) A magnitude 6.3 earthquake struck the Mariana Islands on August 18.
- A magnitude 6.1 earthquake struck Papua New Guinea on August 20.
- A magnitude 6.1 earthquake struck Jalisco, Mexico on August 23.
- A magnitude 5.7 earthquake struck Damghan in northern Iran on August 27. This killed 3 people and also injured 40 others.

=== September ===
September
- Strongest: 7.2 M_{w}, Indonesia
- Total fatalities: 3

Number by magnitude
- 7.0–7.9: 2
- 6.0–6.9: 8
- 5.0–5.9: 135

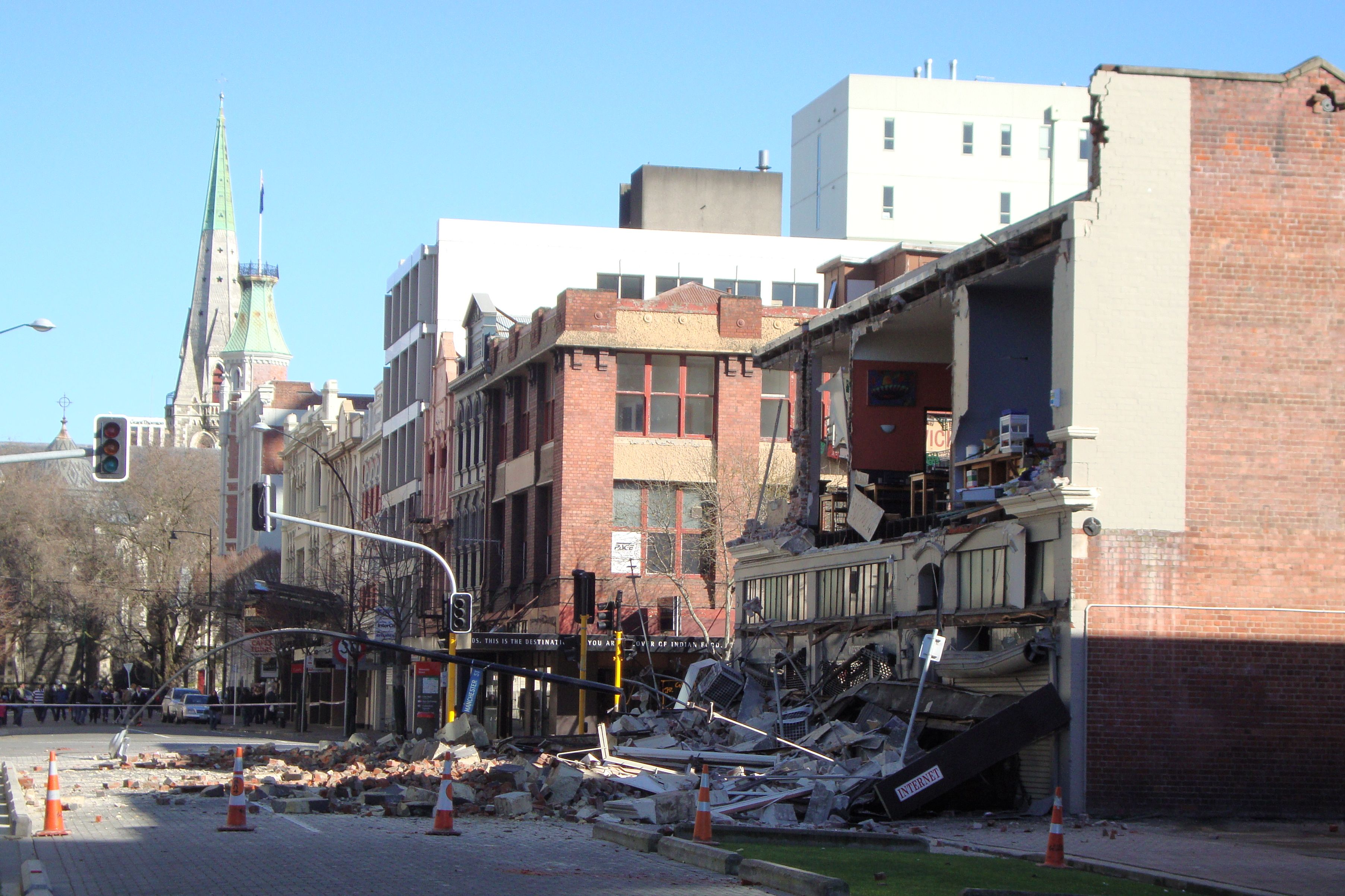
Building damage in Worcester Street, in New Zealand.

- (United States) A magnitude 6.5 earthquake struck the Andreanof Islands, Alaska on September 3.
- A magnitude 7.1 earthquake struck the Canterbury region of New Zealand's South Island on September 4, killing 2 people.
- A magnitude 6.3 earthquake struck Tonga on September 4.
- A magnitude 6.3 earthquake struck in the Fiji region on September 7.
- A magnitude 6.2 earthquake struck Vanuatu, on September 8.
- A magnitude 6.3 earthquake struck Biobío Region, Chile, on September 9.
- A magnitude 6.3 earthquake struck Hindu Kush, Afghanistan on September 17.
- A magnitude 5.8 earthquake struck southern Iran on September 26, killing 1 person.
- A magnitude 6.0 earthquake stuck near the south coast of Papua, Indonesia on September 26.
- A magnitude 6.2 earthquake struck near the south coast of Papua, Indonesia on September 29.
- A magnitude 7.2 earthquake struck near the south coast of Papua, Indonesia on September 29.

=== October ===
October
- Strongest: 7.8 M_{w}, Indonesia
- Total fatalities: 712

Number by magnitude
- 7.0–7.9: 1
- 6.0–6.9: 11
- 5.0–5.9: 135

- A magnitude 6.3 earthquake struck the Ryukyu Islands, Japan on October 4.
- A magnitude 6.4 earthquake struck the Andreanof Islands, Alaska, on October 8.
- A magnitude 6.0 earthquake struck the Andreanof Islands, Alaska, on October 8.
- A magnitude 6.2 earthquake struck Halmahera, Indonesia on October 8.
- A magnitude 5.2 earthquake struck Pakistan on October 10, killing 1 person.
- A magnitude 6.3 earthquake struck Tonga on October 12.
- A magnitude 6.1 earthquake struck the Kepulauan Barat Daya region of Indonesia on October 17.
- A magnitude 6.7 earthquake struck Los Mochis in the Gulf of California, Mexico, on October 21.
- (Indonesia) A magnitude 6.1 earthquake struck the Molucca Sea on October 25.
- A magnitude 7.8 earthquake struck Sumatra, Indonesia on October 25, killing 408 and leaving 303 people missing.
- A magnitude 6.3 earthquake struck Sumatra, Indonesia on October 25.
- A magnitude 6.4 earthquake struck the Pacific-Antarctic Ridge on October 30.

=== November ===
November
- Strongest: 6.8 M_{w}, Japan
- Total fatalities: 2

Number by magnitude
- 6.0–6.9: 6
- 5.0–5.9: 137

- A magnitude 5.3 earthquake struck Kraljevo, Serbia on November 3, killing 2 and injuring over 100.
- A magnitude 6.0 earthquake struck near the south coast of Papua, Indonesia on November 3.
- A magnitude 6.1 earthquake struck Tonga on November 3.
- A magnitude 4.9 earthquake struck western Iran, injuring 100 people.
- A magnitude 6.5 earthquake struck the Southeast Indian Ridge on November 10.
- A magnitude 6.0 earthquake occurred in the South Pacific Ocean on November 21.
- A magnitude 6.1 earthquake struck Papua New Guinea on November 23.
- A magnitude 6.8 earthquake struck the Bonin Islands, Japan on November 30.

=== December ===
December
- Strongest: 7.4 M_{w} Japan
- Deadliest: 6.7 M_{w} Iran; 11 deaths
- Total fatalities: 14

Number by magnitude
- 8.0–8.9: 0
- 7.0–7.9: 2
- 6.0–6.9: 11
- 5.0–5.9: 268

- A magnitude 6.1 earthquake struck the Fiji region on December 1.
- A magnitude 6.7 earthquake struck the New Britain region of Papua New Guinea on December 2.
- (South Georgia and the South Sandwich Islands) A magnitude 6.5 earthquake struck the South Sandwich Islands region on December 8.
- A magnitude 6.2 earthquake struck Bougainville Island, Papua New Guinea on December 13.
- A magnitude 6.7 earthquake struck Southeastern Iran on December 20, killing 11 and injuring 100+, also damaging 1,800+ homes.
- (Indonesia) A magnitude 6.0 earthquake struck the Molucca Sea on December 15.
- A magnitude 5.1 earthquake struck Ethiopia on December 19, injuring 26 and causing extensive damage.
- A magnitude 7.4 earthquake struck Bonin Islands, Japan Region on December 21.
- A magnitude 6.4 earthquake struck the Bonin Islands, Japan Region on December 22.
- A magnitude 6.4 earthquake struck the Aleutian Islands, Alaska on December 23.
- A magnitude 5.1 earthquake struck Puerto Rico on December 24.
- A magnitude 7.3 earthquake struck the South Pacific region near Vanuatu on December 25. Four people were injured by a tsunami in Tanna, which had a maximum height of 4.1 m (13 ft).
- A magnitude 6.0 earthquake struck Vanuatu on December 26.
- A magnitude 4.7 earthquake struck Christchurch, New Zealand, on December 26.
- A magnitude 6.3 earthquake struck the Fiji islands on December 28.
- A magnitude 6.4 earthquake struck Vanuatu on December 29.
- A magnitude 5.0 earthquake struck Poland on December 30. Three miners were killed by falling rocks.

== See also ==
- Lists of 21st-century earthquakes
