= 2010 Papua earthquake =

2010 magnitude 7.0 earthquake in Papua, province of Indonesia

- Location within Papua (province)
- UTC time: 2010-06-16 03:16:27
- ISC event: 600181845
- USGS-ANSS: ComCat
- Local date: June 16, 2010
- Local time: 12:16
- Magnitude: 7.0 M_{w}
- Depth: 15 km (9 mi)
- Epicenter: 2.22°S 136.58°E
- Type: Strike-slip
- Areas affected: Indonesia, Papua
- Max. intensity: MMI VII (Very strong)
- Foreshocks: 6.2 M_{w} June 16 at 03:06:03
- Aftershocks: 6.6 M_{w} June 16 at 03:58:09
- Casualties: 17 killed, 75 injured

The 2010 Papua earthquake occurred on June 16 at 12:16 local time (03:16 UTC) in Papua province of Indonesia. The magnitude 7.0 mainshock was preceded by an M_{w} 6.2 foreshock 10 minutes earlier, and was followed 42 minutes later by an M_{w} 6.6 aftershock.

== Geology ==
This part of Indonesia is an area of complex tectonics. The epicenter of the earthquake lies close to the boundary between two proposed microplates, the Bird's Head and Maoke microplates. The motion along this boundary has been modelled as about 80 mm/year sinistral (left lateral) strike-slip. The computed focal mechanism is consistent either with movement on this boundary or on a dextral (right lateral) strike-slip structure conjugate to it.

== Damage ==
The earthquake destroyed nine villages, namely Aiyari, Randawaya, Hamtimoi, Karowaiti, Waita, Waridoni, Tare, Larelahiti and Wabudayar, killed 17 people and injured 75 others, 6 seriously. More than 2,500 houses were destroyed. While Mercalli intensities of VI (Strong) affected the island of Biak, intensities of more than VII (Very strong) affected Serui (on Yapen) and on the neighbouring coast of the mainland. Many buildings were damaged on Yapen Island.

== See also ==
- List of earthquakes in 2010
- List of earthquakes in Indonesia
- 2002 West Papua earthquake
