= 2002 Sandaun earthquake =

Earthquake in Papua New Guinea

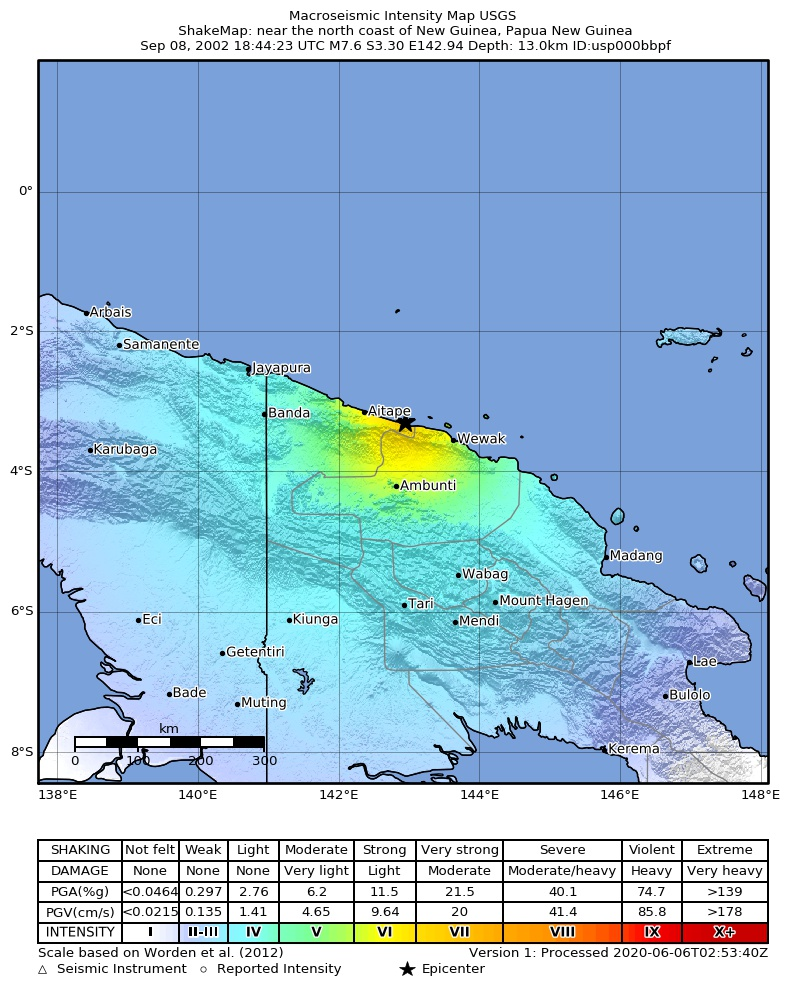
- ShakeMap produced by United States Geological Survey

- Location within Papua New Guinea
- UTC time: 2002-09-08 18:44:23
- ISC event: 3362959
- USGS-ANSS: ComCat
- Local date: 9 September 2002
- Local time: 04:44:23 PGT (UTC+10:00)
- Magnitude: M_{w} 7.6
- Depth: 13 km (8 mi)
- Epicenter: 3.302°S 142.945°E
- Fault: New Guinea Trench
- Type: Reverse
- Areas affected: Sandaun and East Sepik Provinces, Papua New Guinea
- Max. intensity: MMI X (Extreme)
- Tsunami: 5 m (16 ft) in Victoria Bay
- Foreshocks: 36 ≥M_{w} 4.0; Strongest: M_{w} 6.7 on 10 January
- Aftershocks: 109 ≥M_{w} 4.0; Strongest: M_{w} 6.3 on 16 September
- Casualties: 6 dead, 70 injured

On 9 September 2002, at 04:44:23 PGT (18:44 UTC on 8 September), a M_{w} 7.6 earthquake struck off the coast of Sandaun Province in Papua New Guinea. The largest earthquake to hit mainland Papua New Guinea since 1938, this shallow reverse earthquake damaged or destroyed hundreds of homes and buildings in Sandaun and East Sepik Provinces, mainly in the town of Wewak, killing six people and injuring 70 others. A local tsunami measuring 5 m (16 ft) high also caused damage to homes in the region.

== Tectonic setting ==
The island of New Guinea lies within the complex zone of collision between the Australian plate and the Pacific plate. Within this overall setting, the active tectonics of northern Papua New Guinea is dominate by the effects of continuing collision between the Huon–Finisterre island arc terrane with the edge of the Australian continental margin. The overall shortening is concentrated into two zones of thrust faulting, the Ramu–Markham fault zone, which forms the southwestern boundary of the Huon–Finisterre terrane, and the Highlands Thrust Belt, which lies further southwest and deforms the Australian margin. The hanging wall of the Ramu–Markham thrust system is broken up by a series of strike-slip faults. The orientation of these faults, parallel to the direction of thrusting, suggests that they accommodate distortion of the Huon–Finisterre block. Most of the seismicity in northern Papua New Guinea is associated with the Ramu–Markham fault system, with a smaller number of earthquakes occurring on the strike-slip faults and on the Highlands Thrust Belt.

== Earthquake ==
Estimated number of people exposed to shaking levels
MMI	Population exposure
MMI X (Extreme)	4k
MMI IX (Violent)	21k
MMI VIII (Severe)	93k
MMI VII (Very strong)	123k
MMI VI (Strong)	135k

The earthquake was the largest in mainland Papua New Guinea since 1938. The United States Geological Survey reported a magnitude of M_{L} 7.4, M_{w} 7.6 or M_{e} 7.7. It was caused by a rupture on a low-angle thrust fault in the New Guinea Trench, with the rupture occurring on a steep, northwest-striking reverse fault or on a moderately dipping, southeast-striking reverse fault. A fault measuring 72 km (45 mi) in length, and 36 km (22 mi) wide ruptured with a maximum slip of 2.1 m (6.9 ft). A Modified Mercalli intensity of X (Extreme) was estimated, with MMI VI (Strong) shaking recorded in Wewak, Kairiru, Ambunti and Angoram in East Sepik, and Aitape in Sandaun; MMI IV-V (Light-Moderate) was estimated to have been felt in Keerom and Jayapura in eastern Indonesia. ShakeMap perimeters estimate that shaking may have been felt as far away as the towns of Lae and Kerema.

By the end of 2003, 109 aftershocks measuring M_{w} 4.0 or higher were recorded, including three above M_{w} 6.0, with most of them occurring east-southeast of the mainshock along the estimated rupture zone. The strongest aftershock measured M_{w} 6.3 and struck southwest of the mainshock on 16 September. A M_{w} 6.2 event also struck Marienberg Rural LLG in February 2003. Additionally, there were 36 foreshocks preceding the mainshock, including a M_{w} 6.2 event in October 2001, and a M_{w} 6.7 event near Aitape in January 2002 that killed one person and destroyed 450 structures.

== Tsunami ==
A tsunami warning was issued for parts of Papua New Guinea. In East Sepik Province, a 5.01 m (16.4 ft) wave hit the area, destroying several homes. Ten-centimeter waves struck southern Japan. The tsunami was moderate in height; at 1.5 meters along most of the coastline. On several islands however, the run-up was 5 meters. The tsunami's western reach were at Sissano Lagoon and Aitape, which suffered extreme destruction during the 1998 earthquake and tsunami. The high tsunami run-ups in bays were due to the funnel-effect which increased the heights of the waves.

== Damage and casualties ==
On Kairiru and Mushu islands, as well as in the town of Wewak, 500 homes were destroyed and 200 more were damaged, along with pipelines and a bridge. All schools in Wewak were temporarily closed. Three were killed when their houses collapsed. Seventy people were injured, 34 of them seriously, and 3,000 others were made homeless. A woman succumbed to her injuries later at hospital. Two more people, including a child were killed by the following tsunami. In East Aitape Rural LLG, Sandaun Province, ten homes and five water tanks were destroyed, while collapsed homes were also reported in Maprik District. Ubidnim village suffered severe liquefaction when water and sand erupted from the ground as high as 5 meters. Small uplifts of 30–40 cm was measured on several islands and the northern coastline of the Momase Region. On Tarawai Island, two instances of uplift were observed, separated by an hour.

== See also ==
- 1998 Papua New Guinea earthquake
- List of earthquakes in 2002
- List of earthquakes in Papua New Guinea
- 2002 West Papua earthquake
