= 2013 Solomon Islands earthquake =

Megathrust earthquake and tsunami in Solomon Islands

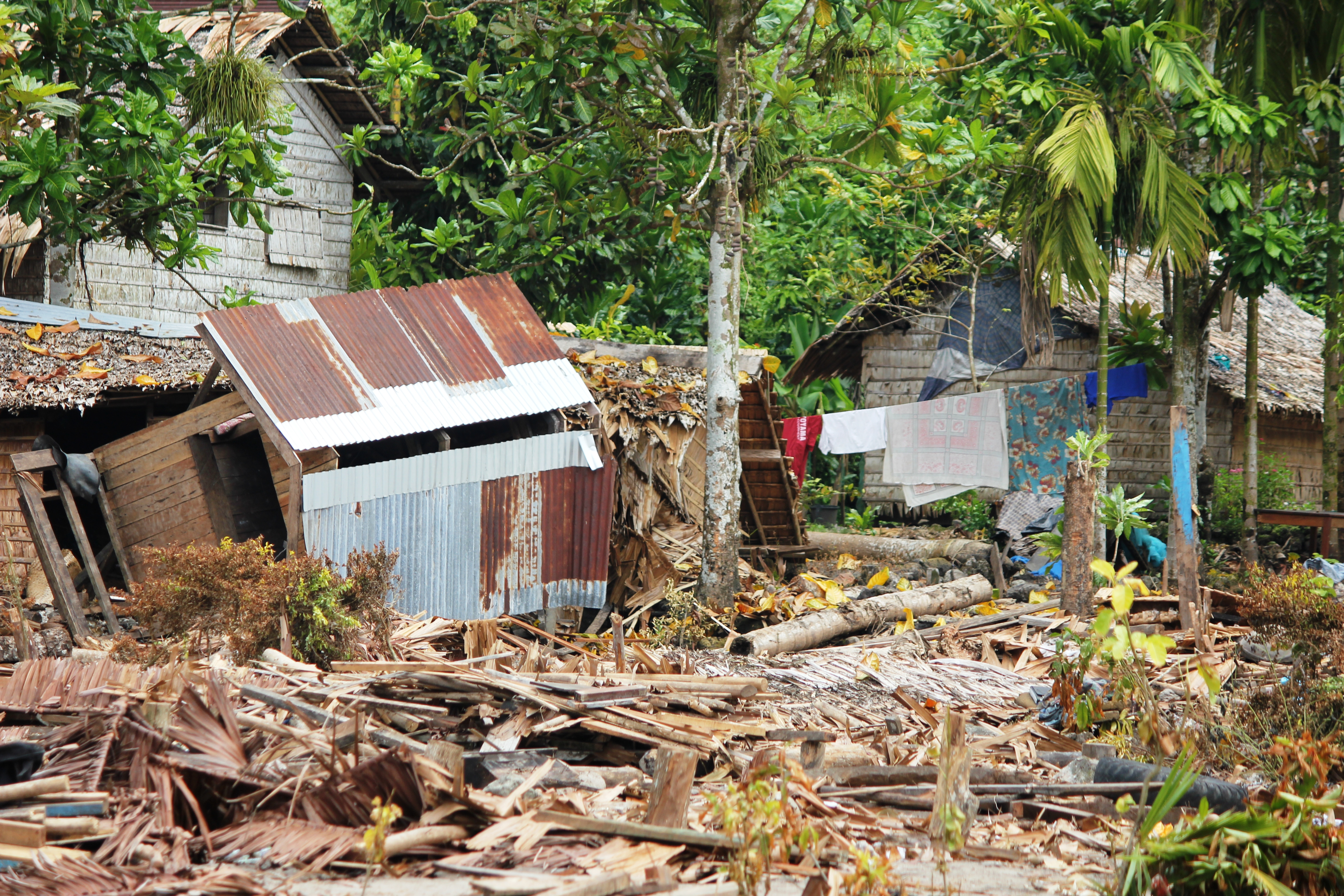
- Tsunami damage in Venga village

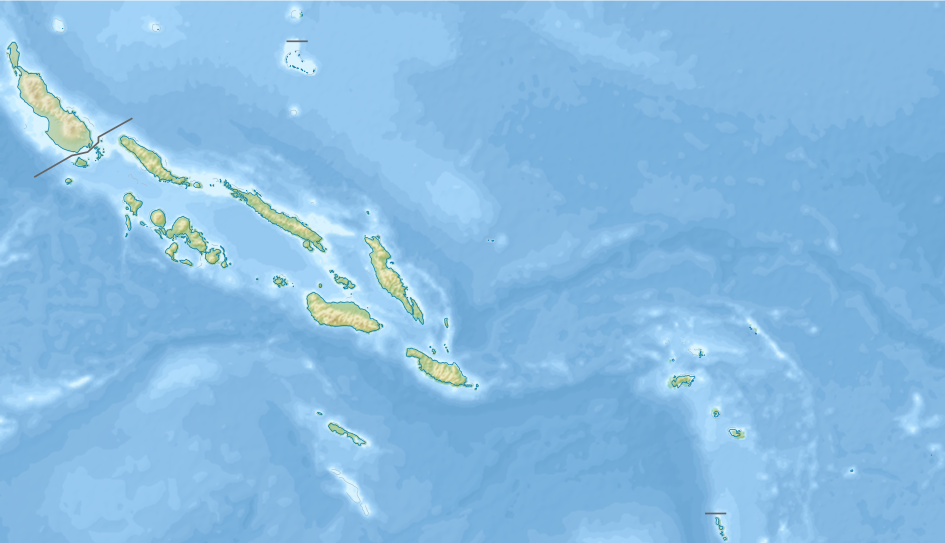
- Location within Oceania Location within Solomon Islands
- UTC time: 2013-02-06 01:12:25
- ISC event: 602419452
- USGS-ANSS: ComCat
- Local date: February 6, 2013
- Local time: 12:12:25 SBT
- Magnitude: 8.0 M_{w}
- Depth: 24 km (15 mi)
- Epicenter: 10.799°S 165.114°E
- Type: Megathrust
- Areas affected: Solomon Islands
- Max. intensity: MMI VIII (Severe)
- Tsunami: 11 m (36 ft)
- Aftershocks: 20
- Casualties: 10 dead, 6 more missing, at least 15 injured.

The 2013 Solomon Islands earthquake (also known as the Santa Cruz earthquake) struck Temotu Province within Solomon Islands on 6 February with a moment magnitude of 8.0 and a maximum Mercalli intensity of VIII (Severe). The epicentre was close to the Santa Cruz Islands within Temotu Province at the boundaries of the Indo-Australian and Pacific tectonic plates, causing local evacuations, a tsunami of 11 m (36 ft) and killing at least ten people.

== Tectonic setting ==
The whole of Solomon Islands, including Santa Cruz, is located on the plate boundary between the Indo-Australian plate and the Pacific plate. This highly seismic region has a "near 90° bend in the boundary..." This area experiences much plate movement as the Santa Cruz Island "has upper plate strike-slip and normal faulting, plate boundary under-thrusting, outer rise extensional faulting, and intraplate faulting" and Solomon Islands is located on the subduction zone of the two boundaries. On 6 February 2013, the largest under-thrusting earthquake ever to be recorded in that area caused a tsunami, and both the earthquake and the tsunami were destructive, destroying many buildings in Temotu and damaging at least 724 homes.

== Earthquake ==
On 6 February 2013, at 12:12 local time (01:12 UTC) an earthquake of M_{w} 8.0 on the moment magnitude scale struck Solomon Islands, in the South Pacific. The epicentre was 76 kilometres (47 mi) west of Lata on Nendö Island, Temotu Province, at a depth of 30 km (19 mi). The earthquake was caused by the interaction between the Indo-Australian plate and the Pacific plate and was preceded by dozens of foreshocks in the region. At least 20 aftershocks were reported, including one measuring M_{w} 7.1 on 8 February and two measuring M_{w} 7.0. "This event had a shallow dipping thrust faulting mechanism...” being an interplate earthquake and “...produced a tsunami of ~ 1.5 height" on the Santa Cruz Islands. In the days leading up to the major earthquake, the area had been seismically active with many earthquakes, some up to M_{w} 6.

The boundary between the Indo-Australian and Pacific plates has complicated faulting patterns around the arcs of Solomon Islands and Vanuatu and is used to high frequency, low to moderate intensity, seismic activity. Many of the "larger events recorded have involved intraplate and interplate earthquakes with magnitudes up to about 8.0, several of which were located near the abrupt bends in the arcs. Solomon Islands has more seismic activity than most adjacent areas, producing more earthquake “doublets” and "triplets", deviations from the normal earthquake aftershock in which a second and sometimes third earthquake can be produced from the aftershock of the first earthquake. This occurs rarely, maybe once or twice a year, making this area a unique seismic area.

The closest land to the epicentre was Nendö Island, Temotu Province, and its principal town Lata, reputedly experienced the largest movement. Aftershocks up to of magnitude 6 continued but the greatest threat was considered to be the potential tsunami. The epicentre area was subsequently hit by thirteen aftershocks greater than magnitude 5".

=== Tsunami ===
The Pacific Tsunami Warning Center issued a tsunami warning for Solomon Islands, Papua New Guinea, Fiji, and several other islands in the region; the agency also issued a tsunami watch for Australia, New Zealand and eastern Indonesia. A tsunami of 11 metres (36 ft) struck Manoputi Village, with heights of 1 metre (3.3 ft) at Lata, Solomon Islands. Smaller tsunamis of 11 cm (4.3 in) and 50 cm (20 in) were reported in Vanuatu and New Caledonia, respectively.

=== Damage ===
The expected tsunami was regarded as the greatest threat but even before the tsunami arrived many coastline villages to the west and south of Lata had already been destroyed by the earthquake itself. Local news agencies reported that four villages were destroyed. Houses were flooded in eastern Temotu Province. On Nendo Island, 1.5 m (4.9 ft) waves damaged 50 buildings. In Lata, the tsunami damaged the airport and flooded low-lying areas, killing nine people, including five elderly and one child. More than 100 houses on the island were destroyed, in addition to 800 others damaged. It was reported that almost all houses in Nela village were washed away, and some homes in Venga village were shifted by water. The earthquake killed 10 people, and 6 people remain listed as missing, with at least 15 injured.

Residents of Solomon Islands and other surrounding islands moved to higher ground causing major traffic jams in the capital, Honiara. Many other Pacific countries ordered precautionary evacuations, even countries not on the warning list. Officials in Nouméa ordered residents to evacuate along the eastern coast of New Caledonia and nearby Loyalty Islands. Residents also evacuated to higher ground in Suva, the capital of Fiji.

== Environmental context ==
There are many human elements that affect the ecosystem and how Santa Cruz, and Solomon Islands generally, will recover. Though once one of the most diverse ecosystems in the world, very little attention is given in the Solomons to biodiversity and environmental conservation. 85% of the people on these islands live a subsistence lifestyle. The population is growing about 4.4% annually and as it grows, the people must use more of their natural resources as food and shelter. The Solomons ecosystems were already being threatened by invasive species, major loss of coastal land, and overharvesting. That means that sudden major loss of biodiversity, like that caused by both the earthquake and tsunami, can lead to "hunger, poverty, disease, and conflict and is a threat to internal security...”.

== See also ==
- 2007 Solomon Islands earthquake
- List of earthquakes in the Solomon Islands archipelago
