= New Guinea Trench =

Oceanic trench

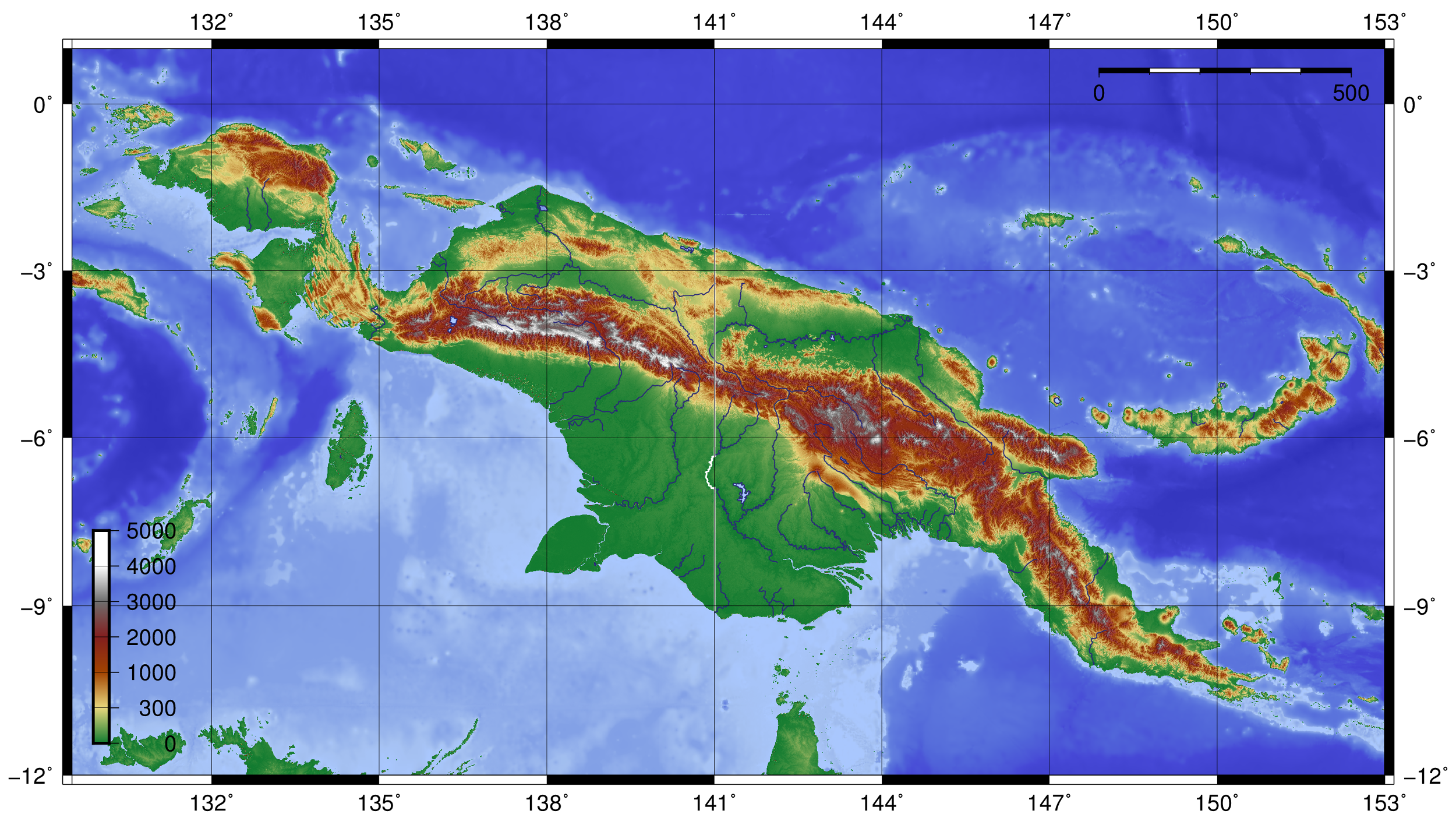
- The New Guinea Trench runs parallel to the northern coast of New Guinea
- Location: northern coast of New Guinea
- Country: Indonesia, Papua New Guinea

Tectonics
- Plate: Australian Plate; Pacific Plate
- Type: Subduction zone

The New Guinea Trench is a trench along the northern coast of New Guinea. It may represent the seafloor expression of an active subduction zone. The trench generally reaches a depth of less than 4,000 m (13,000 ft) because of the subduction of thickened oceanic crust. However in the west, its depth extends to more than 5,000 m (16,000 ft).

== Tectonic setting ==
The tectonic regime in the Indonesian and Papua New Guinea region of the southwestern Pacific Ocean is dominated by oblique convergence between the Australian and Pacific Plates. The convergence resulted in the formation of several microplates to accommodate the tectonic strain. Convergence is mainly accommodated by either subduction along the New Guinea Trench or collision along the Highlands Fold and thrust belt on New Guinea. Subduction of oceanic plate beneath New Guinea occurs in a southwesternly direction.

== Characteristic ==
The trench runs north of New Guinea for 700 km (430 mi). Subduction is active along the trench from Indonesia to Papua New Guinea. Along the trench, the slab subduction angle varies from 10° to 30°. The slab can also be traced to 300 km (190 mi) depth beneath the island. It is interpreted as a geological feature that accommodates oblique convergence between the Pacific Plate and the New Guinea Highlands although its quantified parameters remains undetermined. Due to the moderate seismicity along the trench, it is thought to be accommodating strain through aseismic creep for most of its length.

== Seismicity ==
The 17 February 1996 earthquake near Biak was the largest recorded earthquake along the trench, at M_{w} 8.2. The earthquake rupture geometry was consistent with the geometry of the trench and its aftershocks displayed thrust, strike-slip and normal focal mechanisms. A M_{w} 7.0 earthquake in Aitape, Papua New Guinea, displayed thrust-faulting mechanism, and was determined to have occurred on the plate boundary fault interface. Another M_{w} 7.6 earthquake occurred along the trench fault in 2002.

In 1914, a destructive M_{PAS} 7.9 earthquake with an epicenter between Yapen and the Bird's Head Peninsula produced a significant tsunami. It caused substantial damage on the west coast of Yapen. The tsunami was also recorded in Honolulu, Hawaii, suggesting a source in the Pacific Ocean, possibly the New Guinea Trench. The 1996 tsunami was not recorded in Hawaii suggesting the 1914 event may have been larger.
