= Woodlark plate =

Small tectonic plate located to the east of the island of New Guinea

- Approximate surface projections of active tectonic plates. Key: '"`UNIQ--templatestyles-00000000-QINU`"' Woodlark plate, '"`UNIQ--templatestyles-00000001-QINU`"' Trobriand plate, '"`UNIQ--templatestyles-00000002-QINU`"' Solomon Sea plate, '"`UNIQ--templatestyles-00000003-QINU`"' Active trench subduction boundaries, '"`UNIQ--templatestyles-00000004-QINU`"' Inactive trench subduction boundaries, '"`UNIQ--templatestyles-00000005-QINU`"' current spreading boundary. The Australian plate to the southeast and the Pacific plate to the northwest are not shown, but their complex collision has created these microplates. Click and then mouse over shows feature names.
- Type: microplate
- Movement^{1}: northeast
- Speed^{1}: 58 mm/year
- Features: New Guinea, Pacific Ocean
- ^{1}Relative to the African plate

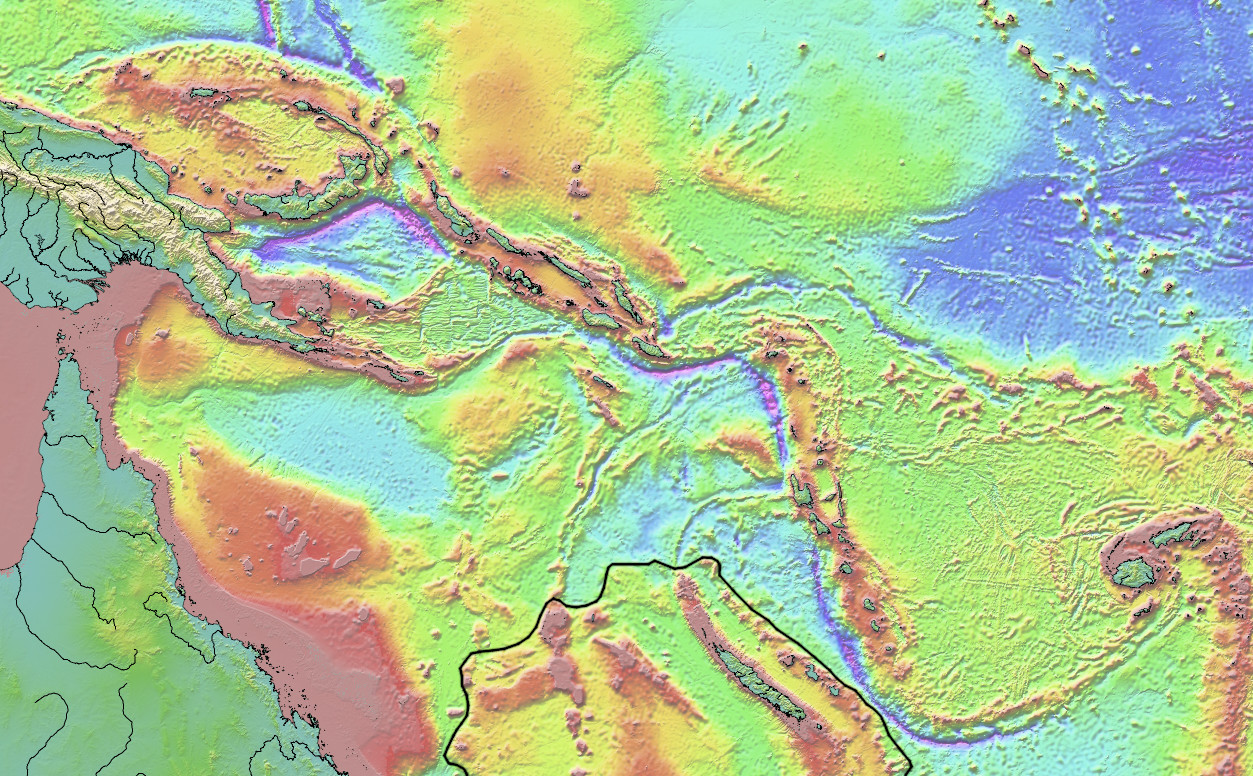
Seafloor topographic map of area of Woodlark plate (W. P.) which is confined to the north of the Woodlark Basin's mid oceanic ridge. The eastern part of the mid oceanic ridge boundary can be seen between the black label W.P, and the white label Woodlark Basin below it.

The Woodlark plate is a small almost triangular shaped tectonic plate located east of the island of New Guinea and situated mainly within the northern half of the Woodlark Basin. It is located in a very complex tectonic environment, that because of associated features, has been extensively studied since it was first proposed to exist. It is now known to be much smaller than originally proposed, mainly because of information from GPS stations on islands and sea floor studies that have fully defined its margins.

== Tectonics ==
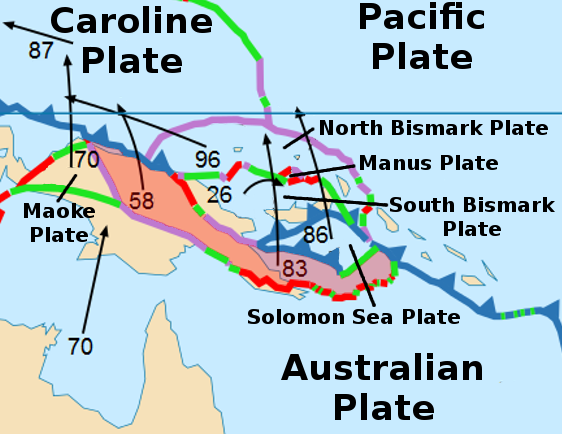
Woodlark plate as based on 2003 modelling -it is now modelled as much smaller and essentially confined to the northern section of the Woodlark Basin.

The Woodlark plate was originally proposed to be somewhat larger than currently is believed to be the case. It is now suspected to have four active triple junctions, two of which are with the Australian plate to its south, based on areas of high seismic activity and other evidence. As originally modelled it extended to the west along the east coast of New Guinea and was subducting beneath the Caroline plate along its northern border. This is no longer accepted to be the case, so that either the Solomon Sea plate, or a further plate called the Trobriand plate must assume this role based on new information such as that from GPS groundstations. In this previous model, the Maoke plate had converged on its west, the Australian plate converges on the south, and on the east there was an undefined compressive zone which might have been a transform fault that marked the boundary with the adjoining to the north Solomon Sea plate. When further oceanographic studies defined that there was a transform fault they also potentially enlarged the size of the Solomon Sea plate or created the need for a further current plate. It was also in this model contacting the South Bismarck plate to the northeast.

Most of its originally assigned area and boundary activity are now assigned to a combination of the Australian plate and other microplates. It is possible that if a still active Trobriand microplate exists, because active subduction is still taking place at the Trobriand Trough, all the western activity that some have assigned to an enlarged Solomon Sea plate will become assigned to the Trobriand microplate. The Trobriand microplate must have existed historically. These assignments are partially informed by GNS studies where the Woodlark Basin region had distinctly different movements from a "Trobriand Block" and multiple eastern New Guinea land "Blocks" so that it was possible to define up to 5 distinct crustal blocks with possible independent movement that others later interpreted as components of differing microplates.

Subduction at the Trobriand Trough was originally assumed to be the case when the existence of the Woodlark plate was first modelled but later went out of favour due to the relatively low seismic activity along some of the Trobriand Trough and measurement of movement across the trough. Today because the Woodlark Basin has been well characterised by deep sea ocean basin standards it is understood to have a northern boundary where the Woodlark Rise is associated with the Nubara Transform Fault. This transform fault is definitely the boundary with the Solomon Sea plate, and will also be the northern boundary with the Trobriand plate if this currently independently exists.

The Woodlark plate's eastern side is being subducted northeast beneath the New Georgia Islands on the Solomon Sea/Pacific plate but here the deformation front lacks a flexed outer rise and bathymetric trench, and is represented by the San Cristobal Trough extension to the north of the San Cristobal Trench. Where the Woodlark Basin is subducted northeast beneath the New Georgia Islands the relative light plate made of recent oceanic type basalt stays shallow and is presumably being melted on mantle contact and producing the many arc volcanoes of the western Solomon Islands.

The southern boundary of the plate is defined by a mid oceanic ridge that is actively spreading tholeiitic basalt similar to mid-ocean ridge basalt (MORB) in a mostly north and south directions across its center in an east–west orientation with the Australian plate being to the south. The spreading centers are offset by transform faults, creating five segments, which causes the spreading center to be uneven across the basin. There are two larger transform faults called respectively the Moresby transform in the middle of the basin and the Simbo transform at the far eastern end of the spreading center.

The rate of spreading in the eastern section of the basin at 6.7 cm/year (2.6 in/year) is significantly higher than the rate of spreading of 3.8 cm/year (1.5 in/year) on the western side of the Woodlark Basin. As the eastern side of the basin has opened up much faster than the western side with the separation at the Moresby Transform Fault there is a shallower seafloor to the West, and an axial graben to the East, that is about 500 m (1,600 ft) deeper than the western basin. The most recent major change in spreading direction of the Woodlark Basin spreading center and thus plate movement occurred about 450,000 years ago with a slowing in rate of divergence about 200,000 years ago.

== See also ==
- Woodlark Basin – Oceanic basin located to the east of the island of New Guinea
