= 1938 Banda Sea earthquake =

- Location within Indonesia
- UTC time: 1938-02-01 19:04:23
- ISC event: 902352
- USGS-ANSS: ComCat
- Local date: February 2, 1938
- Local time: 04:04
- Magnitude: 8.5-8.6 M_{w}
- Depth: 60 km (37 mi)
- Epicenter: 5.05°S 131.62°E
- Type: Oblique-slip
- Max. intensity: MMI VI (Strong); RFS VII (Very strong tremor)
- Tsunami: Yes, 1.5 m (4 ft 11 in)
- Aftershocks: Yes
- Casualties: None

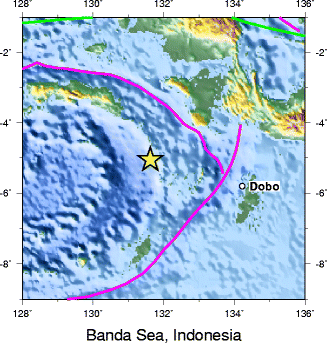
The location of the epicentre of the 1938 Banda Sea earthquake

The 1938 Banda Sea earthquake occurred on February 2 at 04:04 local time with an estimated magnitude of 8.5-8.6 on the moment magnitude scale. Shaking was intense with an assigned Rossi–Forel intensity of VII (Very strong tremor) and intensity of VI (Strong) on the Modified Mercalli intensity scale. This oblique-slip event generated a destructive tsunami of up to 1.5 metres in the Banda Sea region, but there were no deaths.

== Tectonic setting ==
The Banda Sea is located within a very complex tectonic regime that accommodates the convergence between the Australian plate and the Sunda plate. The Molucca Sea plate, Bird's Head plate, Timor plate, and Banda Sea plate all help accommodate the elaborate plate boundary system in the region. This collection of microplates leads to large amounts of seismicity in the area, including the 1852 Banda Sea earthquake which was potentially a M_{w}8.8 event, as well as the 1629 Banda Sea earthquake which was also estimated at up to M_{w}8.8.

== Earthquake ==
At around 04:00 local time, a large earthquake started to shake the Banda islands. The earthquake was assigned a moment magnitude (M_{w}) of 8.5–8.6 and caused a destructive tsunami of 1.5 m (4 ft 11 in) at the Kai islands. The tsunami expected for an earthquake of this size is much greater, such as of those in 1629 and 1852, however this earthquake occurred at a depth of 60 km which impeded much of the ocean floor displacement which leads to a tsunami. Due to its depth, the earthquake was felt strongly in far away Darwin and as far as Merauke and Daly Waters. In Darwin, concrete floors cracked and windows were damaged. This earthquake is of significant scientific interest as it remains a mystery as to precisely which fault produced this earthquake. Some studies consider this earthquake the largest intraslab earthquake on record.

== Tsunami ==
Despite being a large thrust faulting event, the tsunami was rather small. This is assumed to be caused by the 60 kilometer depth. At the Kai islands, runups of 1.5 m (4 ft 11 in) were recorded. Beachfront damage was reported across the Tayandu Islands and the entire Banda region.

== See also ==
- List of earthquakes in 1938
- List of earthquakes in Indonesia
- 1852 Banda Sea earthquake
- Weber Deep

== Sources ==
- Bird, P. (2003). "An updated digital model of plate boundaries". Geochem. Geophys. Geosyst. 4 (3): 1027. Bibcode:2003GGG.....4.1027B. doi:10.1029/2001GC000252. S2CID 9127133.
- Cummins, Phil R.; Meilano, I. (1 January 2017). "Waves of destruction in the East Indies: The Wichmann catalogue of earthquakes and tsunami in the Indonesian region from 1538 to 1877". In Harris, Ron; Major, Jonathon (eds.). Geohazards in Indonesia: Earth Science for Disaster Risk Reduction. Vol. 441. Geological Society of London. doi:10.1144/SP441. ISBN 9781862399709.
- Cummins, Phil R.; Pranantyo, Ignatius R.; Pownall, Jonathan M.; Griffin, Jonathan D.; Meilano, Irwan; Zhou, Siyuan (April 2020). "Earthquakes and tsunamis caused by low-angle normal faulting in the Banda Sea, Indonesia". Nature Geoscience. 13 (4): 312–318. Bibcode:2020NatGe..13..312C. doi:10.1038/s41561-020-0545-x. hdl:10138/327490. S2CID 211729349.
- Engdahl, E. R.; Vallaseñor, A. (2002). "Global seismicity: 1900–1999". International Handbook of Earthquake & Engineering Seismology (PDF). Part A, Volume 81A (First ed.). Academic Press. p. 677. ISBN 978-0124406520.
- Fisher, TszMan L.; Harris, Ron A. (August 2016). "Reconstruction of 1852 Banda Arc megathrust earthquake and tsunami". Natural Hazards. 83 (1): 667. Bibcode:2016NatHa..83..667F. doi:10.1007/s11069-016-2345-6. S2CID 131107365.
- Kaymakci, Nuretdin; Decker, John; Orange, Dan; Teas, Philip; van Heiningen, Pieter (2015). "Tectonic Characteristics and Evolution Banda Sea Region". International Conference and Exhibition, Melbourne, Australia 13-16 September 2015. SEG Library. p. 90. doi:10.1190/ice2015-2205090. ISSN 2159-6832. S2CID 131074367.
- Major, Jonathan Robert; Liu, Zac Yung-Chun; Harris, Ron; Fisher, T. L. (December 2011). "Source of 1629 Banda Mega-Thrust Earthquake and Tsunami: Implications for Tsunami Hazard Evaluation in Eastern Indonesia". AGU Fall Meeting Abstracts. 2011: 1376. Bibcode:2011AGUFMNH13B1376M.
- McCue, Kevin (17 November 2013). Historical earthquakes in the Northern Territory (PDF). 2013 Australian Earthquake Engineering Society. Hobart, Australia.
- Okal, E. A.; Reymond, D. (2003). "The mechanism of great Banda Sea earthquake of 1 February 1938: Applying the method of preliminary determination of focal mechanism to a historical event". Earth and Planetary Science Letters. 216 (1–2): 1–15. Bibcode:2003E&PSL.216....1O. doi:10.1016/S0012-821X(03)00475-8.
- Ringer, H.; Whitehead, J. P.; Krometis, J.; Harris, R. A.; Glatt-Holtz, N.; Giddens, S.; Ashcraft, C.; Carver, G.; Robertson, A.; Harward, M.; Fullwood, J.; Lightheart, K.; Hilton, R.; Avery, A.; Kesler, C.; Morrise, M.; Klein, M. H. (15 March 2021). "Methodological Reconstruction of Historical Seismic Events From Anecdotal Accounts of Destructive Tsunamis: A Case Study for the Great 1852 Banda Arc Mega-Thrust Earthquake and Tsunami". Journal of Geophysical Research: Solid Earth. 126 (4). arXiv:2009.14272. Bibcode:2021JGRB..12621107R. doi:10.1029/2020JB021107. S2CID 222066748.
