= 1852 Banda Sea earthquake =

Earthquake and tsunami in Indonesia

- Location within Indonesia
- Local date: 26 November 1852
- Magnitude: 7.5 M_{w} 8.4–8.8 M_{w}
- Epicenter: 5.25°S 129.75°E
- Areas affected: Dutch East Indies (present-day Indonesia)
- Max. intensity: MMI XI (Extreme)
- Tsunami: +8 metres (26 ft)
- Casualties: 60+ dead

The 1852 Banda Sea earthquake struck on 26 November at 07:40 local time, affecting coastal communities on the Banda Islands. It caused violent shaking lasting five minutes, and was assigned XI on the Modified Mercalli intensity scale in the Maluku Islands. A tsunami measuring up to 8 m (26 ft) slammed into the islands of Banda Neira, Saparua, Haruku and Ceram. The tsunami caused major damage, washing away many villages, ships and residents. At least 60 people were killed in the earthquake and tsunami. The earthquake had an estimated moment magnitude of 7.5 or 8.4–8.8, according to various academic studies.

== Tectonic setting ==
The Banda Sea is situated in a region of complex convergence involving the Australian and Sunda plates. This complex tectonic interaction has broken the crust into a number of minor plates and microplates including the Banda Sea, Timor, Molucca Sea and Bird's Head plates. Resembling an arch, this convergent boundary is one of the most complex in the world. Oceanic lithosphere subducts to a depth greater than 600 km beneath the Banda Sea. As a consequence, the Banda Sea is a seismically active region. Many large earthquakes in the Banda Sea occur at a hypocentral depth of up to 600 km, including an M_{w} 7.6 which struck at 397 km (247 mi) depth. These intermediate (70–300 km (43–186 mi)) and deep-focus (>300–700 km (190–430 mi)) earthquakes are the result of dip-slip faulting within the oceanic lithosphere, which usually do not result in significant impact. The M_{w} 8.5–8.6 1938 Banda Sea earthquake was an intermediate-focus thrust earthquake.

== Earthquake ==
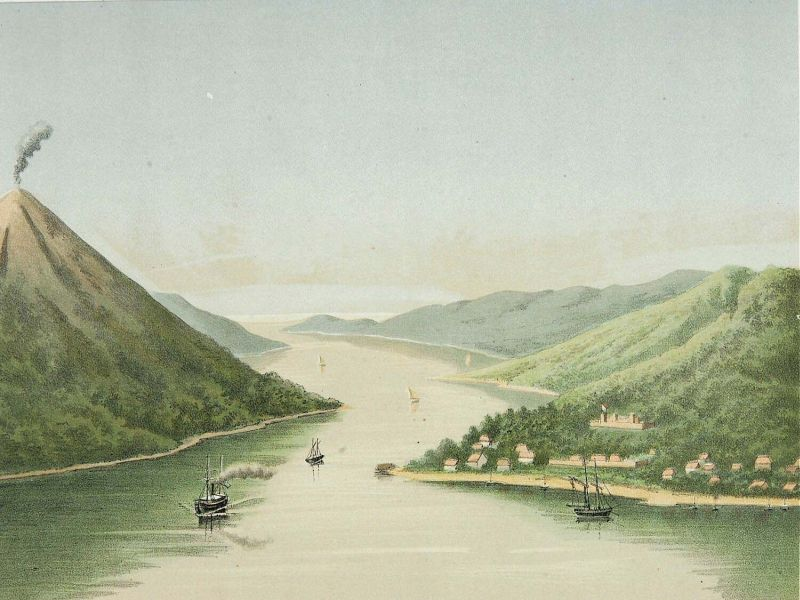
An illustration of Banda Neira in the 1880s which was badly impacted by the earthquake of 1852.

At about 07:40–07:50 local time on 26 November, Banda Neira was rocked by a series of intense "vertical shocks" which developed into rolling motions. The rolling motion was directed in a northwest–southeast orientation for five minutes. The first shock was so strong that nearly every home on the island collapsed. Houses that withstood the shaking were severely cracked and became uninhabitable. Papenberg, a small peak on the island, collapsed as well. Many large cracks formed at the beaches on the island. Similar effects were described on Banda Besar. The tremors were accompanied by a loud rumble described as "cannon shots".

On the islands of Rosengain and Pulau Ai, the earthquake was also felt with a great force, later assigned XI on the Mercalli intensity scale. On Haruku Island, cracks appeared in the walls of a fort and church. Damage to structures was also reported on Saparua. The island of Ambon was undamaged but felt the tremors for five minutes intensely. On Bacan Island, trees and flagstaffs were observed swaying.

Three newly formed but small islands were seen after the earthquake. The islands were "soft and had a yellow golden color" to them. Coral remains and yellow sand was likely the composition of the islands. One of the islands later washed away while the remaining two had vegetation grown on them. Another island at 5.583°S 133.000°E, measuring 250 meters in diameter was also discovered.

In Surabaya, Java, weak tremors were felt, but they were likely due to a separate event.

== Tsunami ==
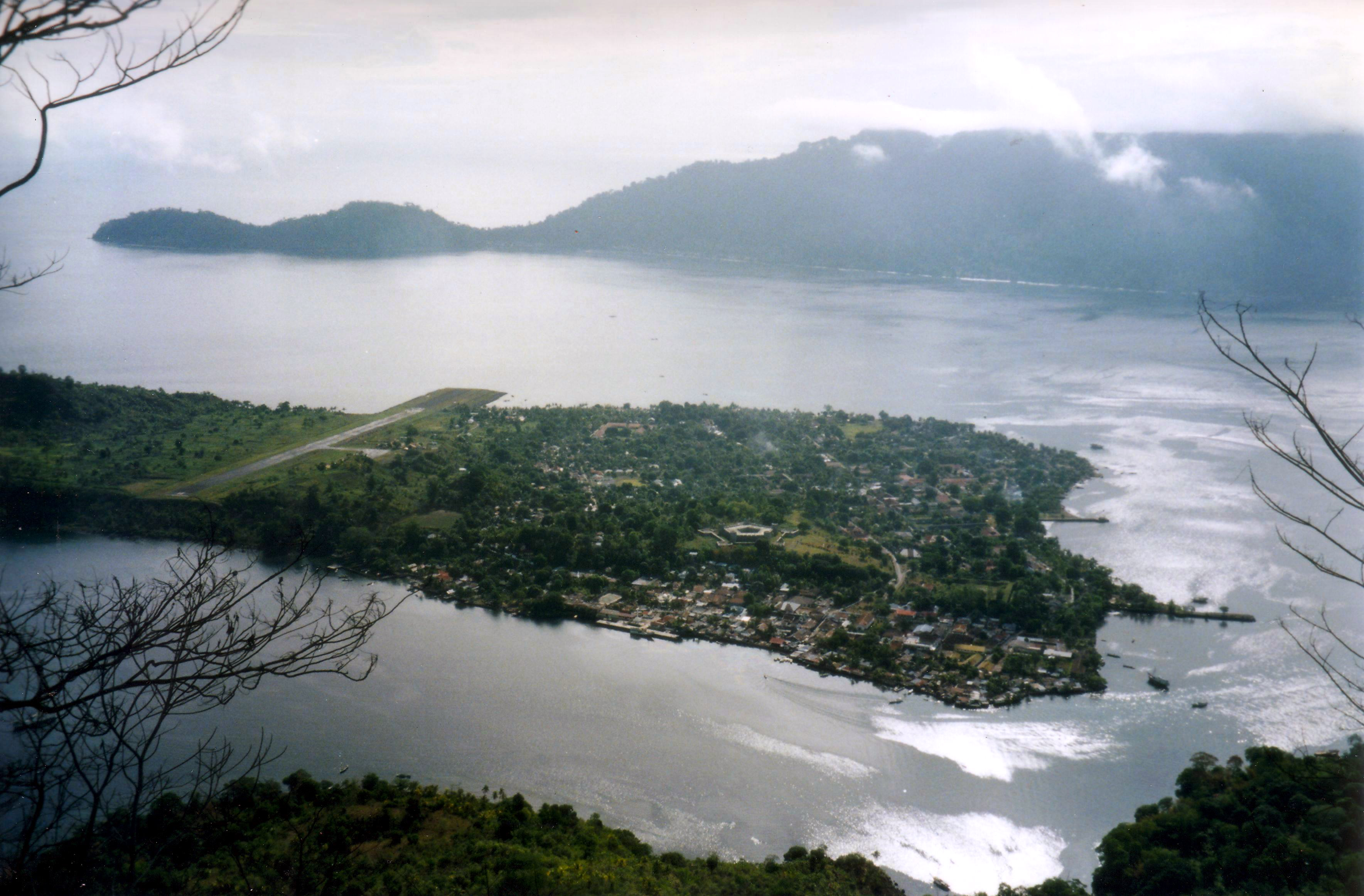
A coastal town on the island of Banda Neira. The coastlines were struck by the tsunami of 1852.

The highest tsunami wave was recorded on the island of Banda Neira with a height of 8 meters. It struck the island approximately 25 minutes after the shaking had stopped. Many residents who witnessed the oncoming waves were frightened and fled for the hills. Sixty boat crews died when the tsunami overcame the breakwater and embankments where they had sought refuge. The waves carried with it many proas, smashing them against the embankment. Waves also wiped out buildings at the coast. Four separate waves were observed with regular intervals until 10:30 when the water began to calm down.

On Pulau Ai, the tsunami was significant, being one meter higher than the usual flood tide level. Descriptions of the tsunami in Ambon are unclear, with sources claiming the waves were 8 meters tall while others stating they were 20 cm higher than the flood tide mark. Flood damage to homes, proas and beaches occurred on Ceram Island.

== Earthquake and tsunami origins ==
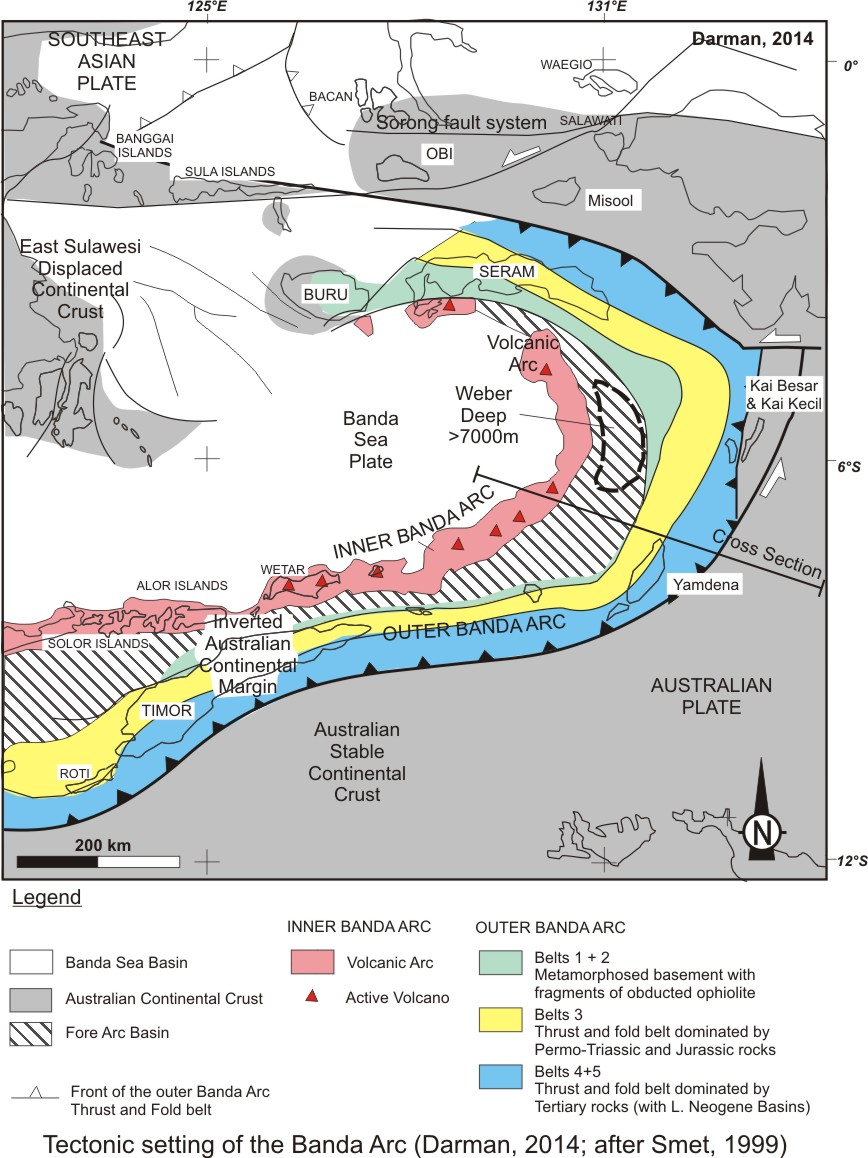
Tectonic map of the Banda Arc

Due to the lack of instrumental data, the mechanism of the earthquake is still debatable, with published sources suggesting the event was a large megathrust earthquake with an estimated moment magnitude (M_{w}) of 8.4 or greater. Other research journals claim it was a shallow normal faulting event with a smaller magnitude of 7.5.

=== Normal fault theory ===
A publication in 2020 led by Phil Cummins suggests the event did not occur on a megathrust fault, but rather, a shallow normal fault in the Banda Sea. The normal fault was determined as being the Banda Detachment, a shallow-dipping structure that accommodates extension of the Banda Sea. It is thought to be the only major potentially seismogenic structure to cause heavy shaking and a large tsunami. The earthquake potential and history of this structure is still poorly understood, and have never been considered a tsunami and seismic hazard to the region. The Weber Deep, a 7.2-km deep forearc basin between the megathrust front and Banda Arc volcanic chain is a massive fault scarp which formed when extension along the Banda Detachment started. However, there have been no instrumentally recorded earthquakes on this fault, therefore, it is suggested that the structure is creeping aseismically, or that earthquakes on this fault have occurred before the birth of modern seismic instruments.

The research presented a much smaller earthquake moment magnitude of only 7.5 with a rupture close to the Banda Islands. An earthquake anywhere on the megathrust is unlikely to result in violent ground motions as described in the historical accounts because it is too far from the islands. The study dismissed all reports of shaking felt in Surabaya, Java as being a separate, local earthquake which timing coincided with the one in the Banda Sea. This event in Java, named the Grati earthquake, is thought to have a magnitude of M_{w} 5.7–6.0 and occurred on the Pasuruan Fault.

Explicit descriptions of the tsunami in the Banda Islands described a rise in sea level, followed by a drop. This meant the earthquake could not be sourced from a subduction zone megathrust event as such a tsunami would be observed as a drawback of the water first in the same location. The Banda Islands situated on the overriding plate would experience a negative wave first before a large tsunami could hit, thus a drawback would be observed. Furthermore, a megathrust earthquake-sourced tsunami would take much longer for it to hit the islands, while historic descriptions stated that the tsunami arrived 20 minutes after the five minutes of shaking.

The research paper presented two nearby plausible tsunami sources; the western seafloor expression of the Banda Detachment at 100 km south southeast of Banda Neira, or a slump on the eastern edge of the Weber Deep. Modeling the tsunami sourced by a slump fits the well-documented accounts of the tsunami better. The associated tsunami therefore was caused by submarine slumping triggered by the M_{w} 7.5 earthquake.

=== Megathrust theory ===
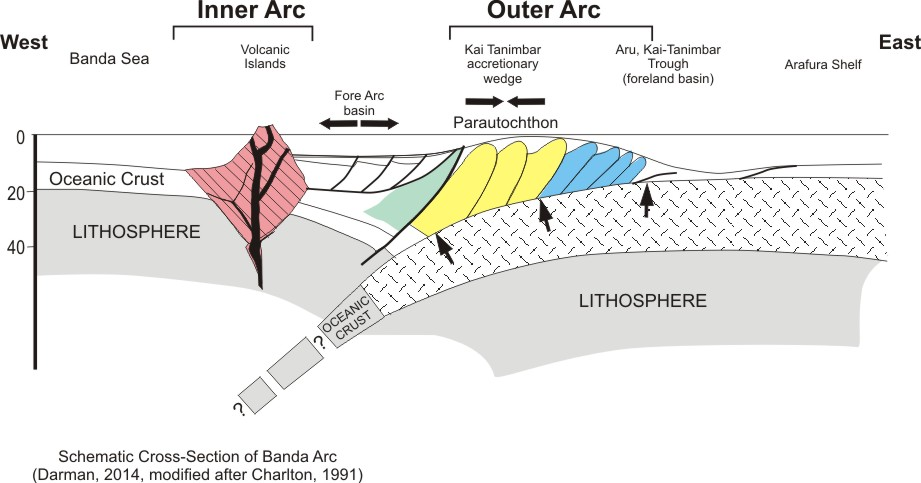
Cross section of the Banda Arc

In a 2016 study by Fisher and Harris, they concluded that the earthquake and tsunami was the result of thrust faulting on a subduction zone. A series of reconstructions with varying locations and maximum slip yielded moment magnitudes of 8.4–8.8. Using the models, they concluded that the earthquake was a thrust faulting, megathrust event which ruptured a subduction zone along the Tanimbar Trough. They estimate at least 10–15 m (33–49 ft) of slip had been cumulated, which would suggest a minimum moment magnitude of 8.4.

A 2021 paper led by Hayden Ringer and others suggested a larger moment magnitude of 8.8, southeast of Seram Island. The authors noted Phil Cummins' conclusion (normal fault theory) that the resulting tsunami was by an earthquake-triggered slump of low possibility because the 1938 Banda Sea earthquake did not trigger a large tsunami from a major submarine landslide.

Modeling of their earthquake showed that the 1852 event had a magnitude of approximately 8.8 M_{w}. The earthquake epicenter coordinate is at 4.5°S 131.5°E, southeast of Seram Island. A tsunami model for rupture along the Seram Trough fits well with arrival time and run-up data. They also noted the tsunami reached distant locations with heights greater than what would be expected for a landslide-induced tsunami. Had the tsunami been triggered by a submarine landslide, the waves would have weakened significantly at a faster rate than if triggered by faulting.

Cummins counter-argued the megathrust claim by Fisher and Harris on the absence of a drawback along the coast which was not described in observational accounts but reflected in their model. However, the accounts of survivors recalled a surge in seawater, followed by the tsunami waves. Ringer's paper stated that the non-existent record of a drawback associated with the negative wave does not rule out the plausibility of a megathrust earthquake. His team also distinguished the day and period of the event, which was during the spring tide, meaning tide levels were at extreme lows. This meant even a negative wave would not cause a significant difference in sea level. It is therefore unlikely that Dutch officials would document a barely noticeable change in tide level.

== See also ==
- List of earthquakes in Indonesia
- List of historical earthquakes
- List of tsunamis
