= Mount Wurlali =

Mountain in Maluku, Indonesia

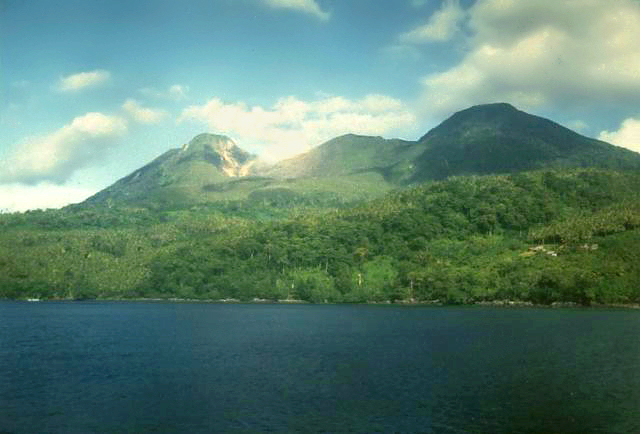

Highest point
- Elevation: 868 m (2,848 ft)
- Coordinates: 7°7′30″S 128°40′30″E

Geography
- Location within Indonesia
- Location: Damar Island, Indonesia

Geology
- Mountain type: Stratovolcano
- Volcanic arc: Banda Arc
- Last eruption: June 1892

Mount Wurlali (also known as Mount Damar) is an andesitic stratovolcano on Damar Island in the Banda Arc system. Fumarolic activities with sulfur deposits are found at the twin summit craters and on the southeast flanks.

Wurlali is the most active volcano of the Banda Arc in historical times. It lies at the northern end of a five-kilometer-wide caldera. The southwest flank of the crater contains sulfur deposits. The last eruption took place in 1892.

In 1993 there was an earthquake, landslides, and smoke. Four-thousand people were evacuated. On January 23, 2003, there was an earthquake with a magnitude of 6.1. Close to the beach, south-west of the volcano, hot springs emerged.

== See also ==
- List of volcanoes in Indonesia
