= Weber Deep =

Oceanic Abyssal Plain in the Western Pacific Ocean

Coordinates: 5.439277°S 131.014524°E

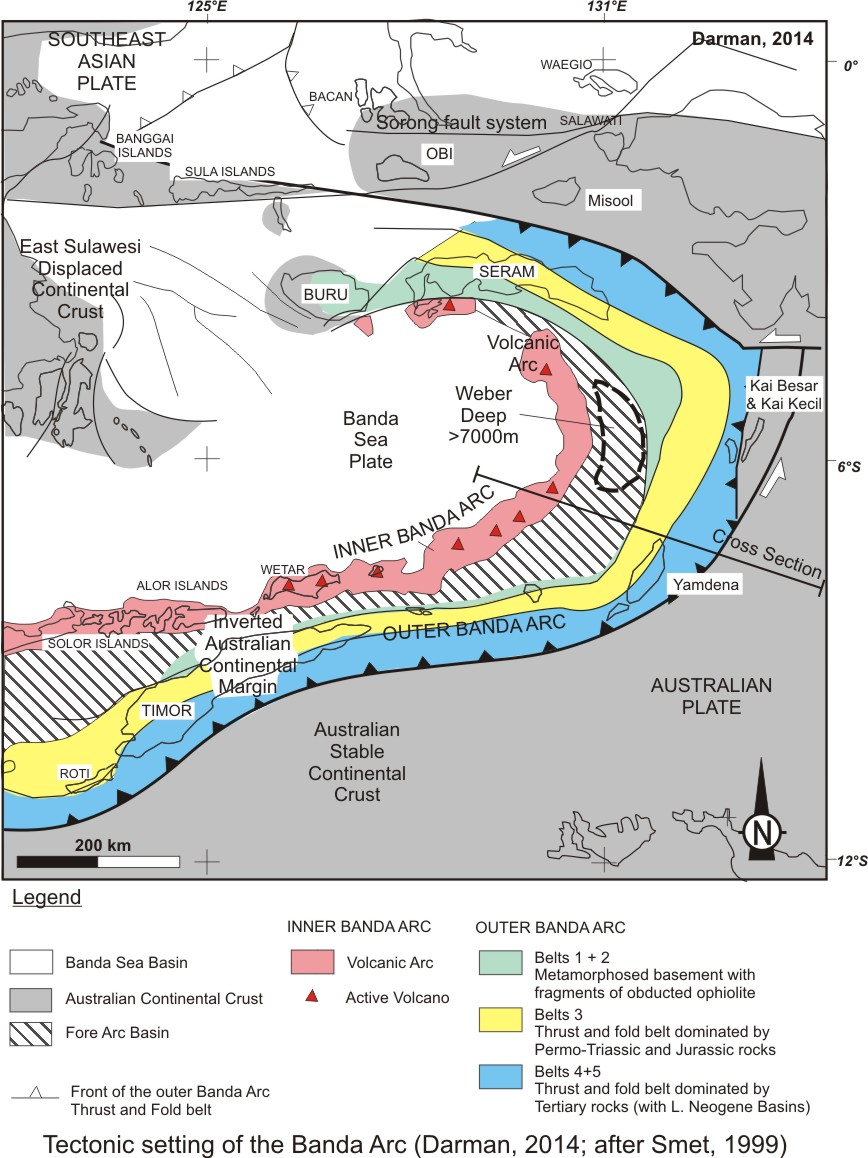
Banda Arc tectonic map, Weber Deep in the ForeArc basin

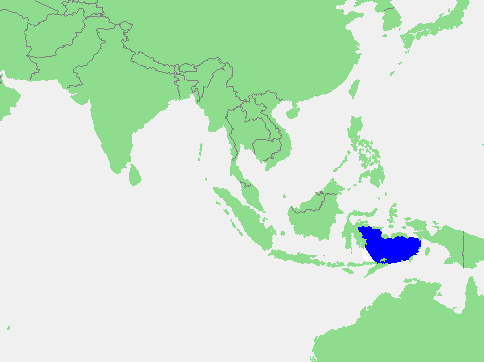
Location of the Banda Sea in Southeast Asia

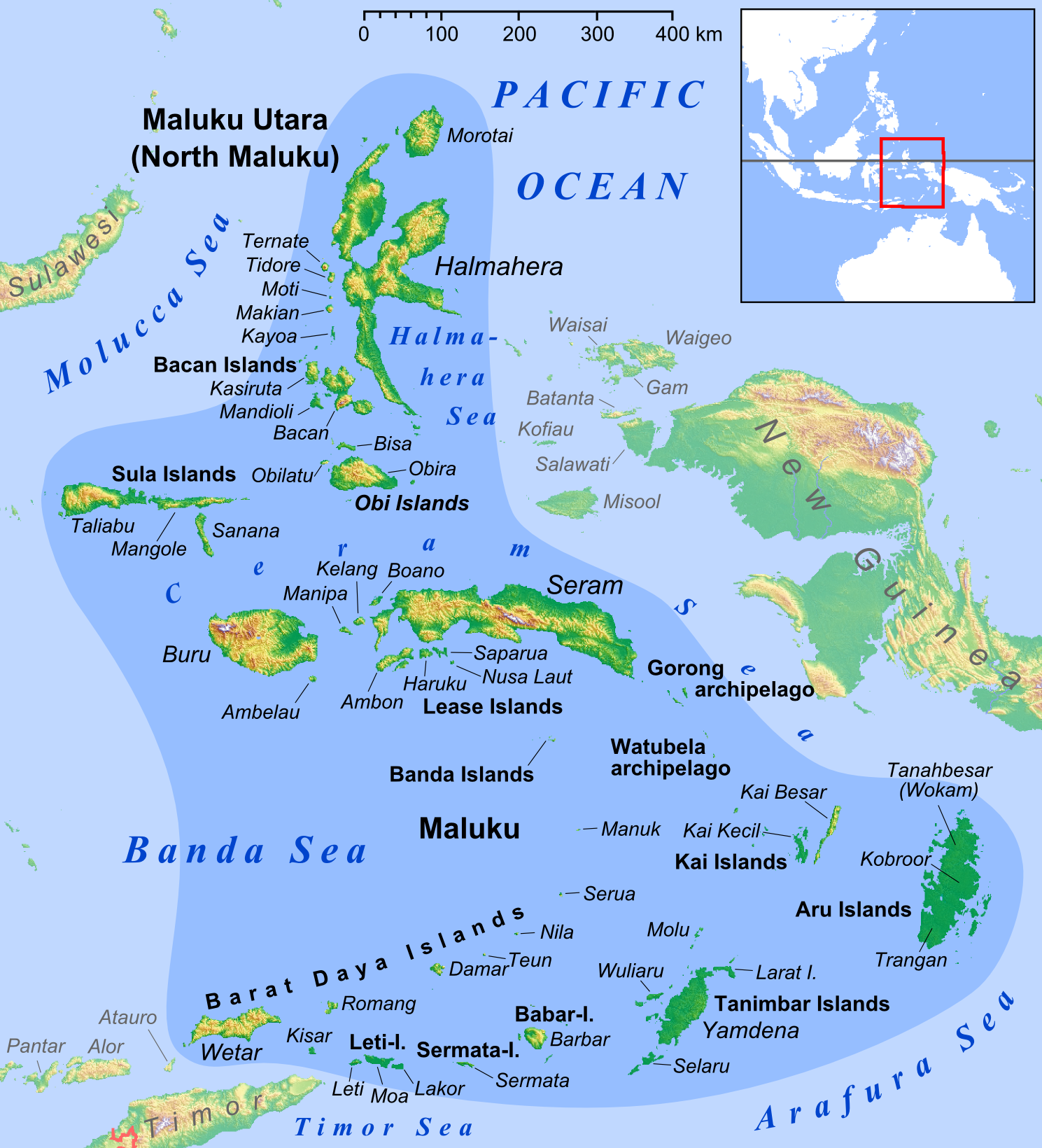
Banda Sea in the center of Maluku Islands

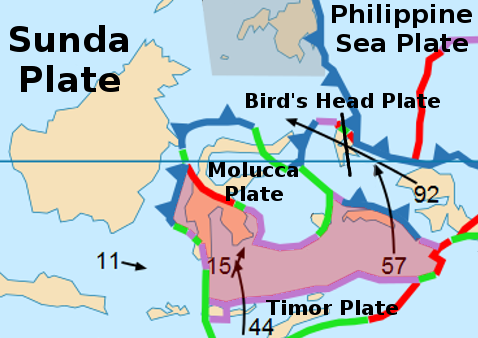
Map of the Banda Sea plate. Weber Deep is at the location of the number 57 on the map

Weber Deep (Indonesian: Kedalaman Weber) is the deepest point in the Banda Sea off Indonesia. Weber Deep maximum depth is 7,351 meters, (24,117 feet, 4.56 miles). Banda Sea is connected to the Pacific Ocean, near the Maluku Islands of Indonesia in the Banda Arc. Weber Deep differs from other deep sea points in that Weber Deep is not a deep sea trench, but is a forearc basin, a deep abyssal plain. The slab detachment is at the east end of the deep. Weber Deep is the 16th deepest point in the Earth's oceans and seas.

Researchers believe that the Weber Deep was formed when part of the Earth's crust broke off along a 120 km (75 miles) extension of a fault on the ring of fire, called the Banda Detachment. The break-off was caused by plate tectonics creating a back-arc basin rip in the ocean floor. In parts of Weber Deep there is no oceanic crust on the sea floor due to the rip. The rip is approximately 60,000 km^{2}(23,166 miles^{2}). Researchers believe Weber Deep is the world's largest exposed fault on the ring of fire.

The fault along Weber Deep and the Banda Sea is still active. The most extreme event on the fault recorded was in 1629. A Richter magnitude scale 9.2 megathrust earthquake produced a 15-meter (49-foot) tsunami. For nine years after 1629 the area had aftershocks.

The closest land to Weber Deep is at the east end of the Banda Sea, surrounded by Watubela archipelago, Timor, Buru, Seram, Ambon and Kur Island. To the west of the Weber Deep is the Banda Volcanic Arc also called the Inner Banda Arc. The Manuk volcanic island is the closest to the Weber Deep in the Volcanic Arc. The floor of the Weber Deep dates to 3.0 to 0.5 million years old. This young sea floor was created by the eastward expansion (rip) of the Banda Sea. Weber Deep is about 450 km long running north to south.

Weber Deep is named after Max Carl Wilhelm Weber (1852–1937), who was the leader of a marine biological expedition, the Siboga expedition, using the 50.6-meter gunboat Siboga of the Dutch East Indies navy. Max Weber was a professor at University of Utrecht and the University of Amsterdam in Amsterdam, his first trip to the Banda Sea was in 1881. The biological expedition departed Amsterdam on the Siboga on December 16, 1898. The expedition also did depth soundings.

Weber Deep was found in 1929 by the 204-foot 1928 HMS Willebrord Snelliu (named after Willebrord Snellius) using an echo sounder on a Dutch oceanographic expedition to the Banda Sea from March 1929 to November 1930. Hilbrand Boschma (1893–1976) was a Dutch zoologist on the expedition. In 1951 a more in-depth expedition of Weber Deep and the Banda Sea was done on the Galathea Deep Sea Expedition from 1950 to 1952. The expeditions found on the Weber Deep sea floor deep sea sea cucumbers and aerobic bacteria.

== See also ==
- Australasian realm
- 1852 Banda Sea earthquake
- 1938 Banda Sea earthquake
