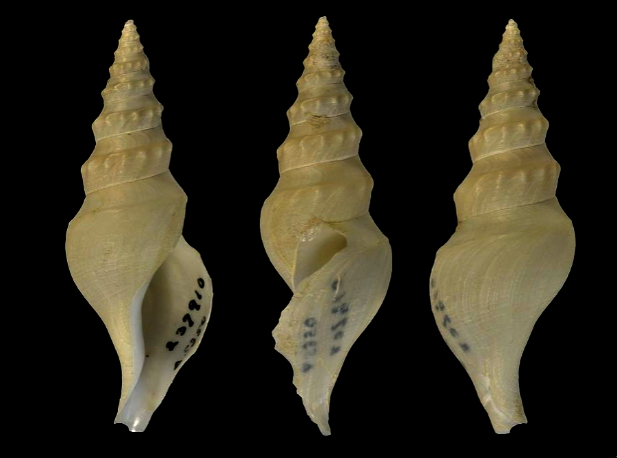
- Shell of Leucosyrinx palawanica (holotype at the Smithsonian Institution)

Scientific classification
- Kingdom: Animalia
- Phylum: Mollusca
- Class: Gastropoda
- Subclass: Caenogastropoda
- Order: Neogastropoda
- Superfamily: Conoidea
- Family: Pseudomelatomidae
- Genus: Leucosyrinx
- Species: L. palawanica

Binomial name
- Leucosyrinx palawanica (A. W. B. Powell, 1969)

Synonyms
- Comitas aequatorialis palawanica A. W. B. Powell, 1969

= Leucosyrinx palawanica =

Species of mollusc

Leucosyrinx palawanica is a species of sea snail, a marine gastropod mollusc in the family Pseudomelatomidae, the turrids and allies.

== Description ==
The length of the shell attains 43.5 mm, its diameter 15 mm.

The species is known from a single holotype. The shell sculpture pattern and the shape of the subsutural anal sinus fit well within the variability observed in species of Leucosyrinx. Originally, it was described as a subspecies of Leucosyrinx aequatorialis Thiele, 1925, but differs markedly in size (43.5 mm vs 13 mm). Additionally, in L. aequatorialis, the body whorl lacks axial ribs and a shoulder carina, while the carina is well-developed in L. palawanica.

== Distribution ==
This marine species occurs in the Banda Sea near Indonesia; also off Northwest Australia at depths between 300 m and 411 m.
