= Manuk =

Volcanic island in Indonesia

- Location within Maluku

Highest point
- Elevation: 282 m (925 ft)
- Coordinates: 5°32′38″S 130°18′19″E

Geography
- Location: Banda Sea, Indonesia

Geology
- Mountain type: Stratovolcano
- Volcanic arc: Banda Arc

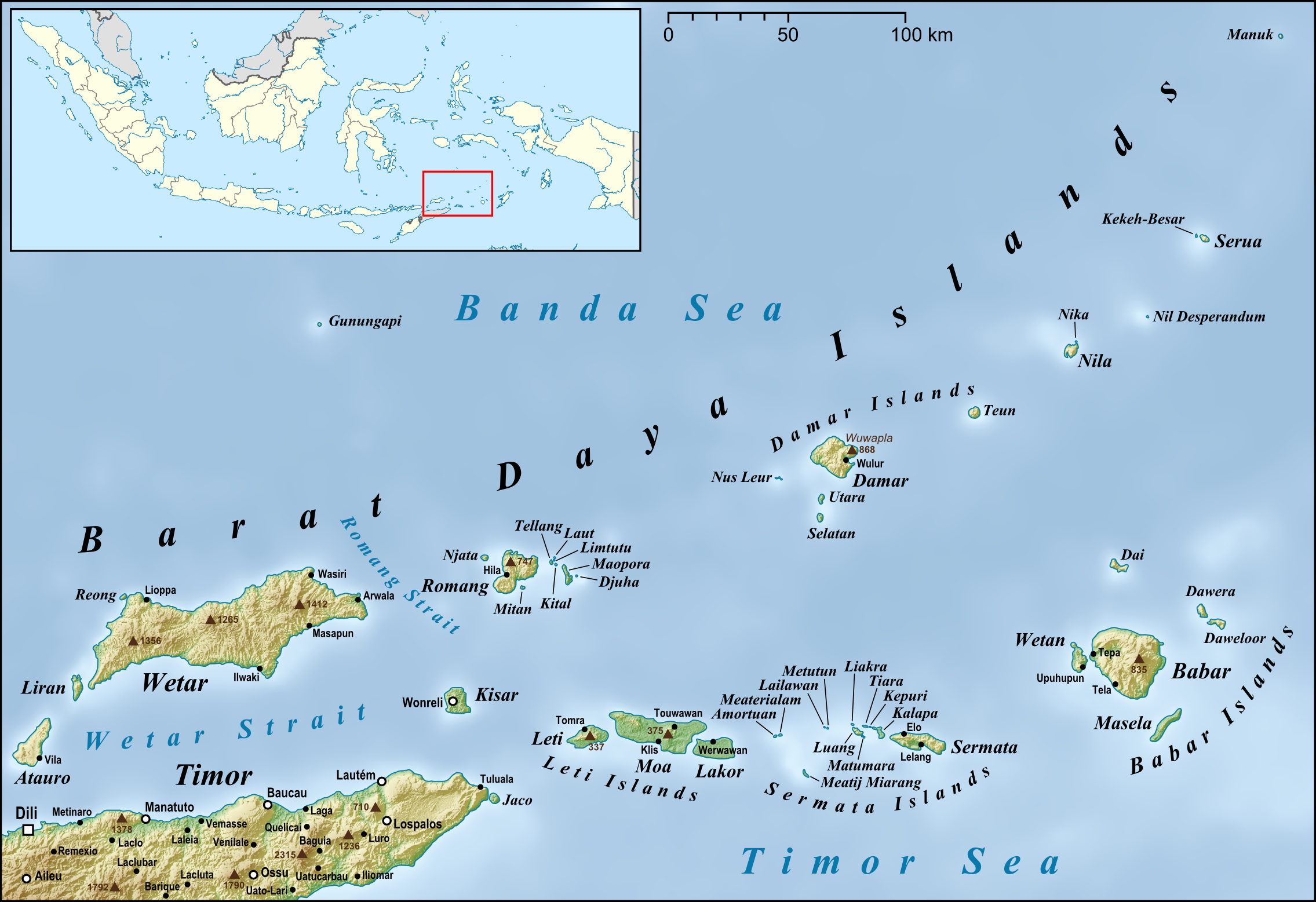
Manuk Island in the north east of the Barat Daya Islands

Manuk is an uninhabited volcanic island located in the Banda Sea, Indonesia. Administratively it is part of the Central Maluku Regency, Maluku Province.

Manuk means bird in various Austronesian languages.

== Mount Manuk ==
Mount Manuk is a truncated andesitic volcano on Manuk Island. Rising 3,000 m from the sea floor, it is the easternmost volcano of the Banda Arc chain that forms a volcanic island. No confirmed historical eruptions are known from Manuk.

== See also ==
- List of volcanoes in Indonesia
- Weber Deep
