= List of earthquakes in 1938 =

Earthquakes in 1938
Approximate epicenters of the earthquakes in 1938
- 4.0–5.9 magnitude
- 6.0–6.9 magnitude
- 7.0–7.9 magnitude
- 8.0+ magnitude
- Strongest: Dutch East Indies, Banda Sea, (Magnitude 8.5) February 1
- Deadliest: Turkey, Kirsehir Province, (Magnitude 6.6) April 19 224 deaths
- Total fatalities: 296

Number by magnitude
- 9.0+: 0

This is a list of earthquakes in 1938. Only magnitude 6.0 or greater earthquakes appear on the list. Lower magnitude events are included if they have caused death, injury or damage. Events which occurred in remote areas will be excluded from the list as they wouldn't have generated significant media interest. All dates are listed according to UTC time. This was once again a very busy year with 22 events reaching 7.0+. Topping the list was a huge quake which struck the Banda Sea, Dutch East Indies in February. At a magnitude of 8.5 this was one of the largest earthquakes of all time. Despite the large size no deaths were reported. Despite the array of large events, the death toll for the year was only 296. Turkey saw the majority of the deaths due to a 6.6 magnitude event in April. November saw a series of large quakes strike off the east coast of Honshu, Japan. Also in November was a magnitude 8.3 which struck Alaska. Generally Dutch East Indies and Japan saw most of the large 7.0+ events.

== Overall ==
=== By death toll ===
Rank	Death toll	Magnitude	Location	MMI	Depth (km)	Date
1	224	6.6	Turkey, Kırşehir Province	X (Extreme)	10.0	April 19
2	51	6.0	British Burma, Shan State	VIII (Severe)	0.0	May 14
3	17	7.7	Dutch East Indies, Makassar Strait	IX (Violent)	35.0	May 19

- Note: At least 10 casualties

=== By magnitude ===
Rank	Magnitude	Death toll	Location	MMI	Depth (km)	Date
1	8.5	0	Dutch East Indies, Banda Sea	( )	25.0	February 1
2	8.2	0	United States, south of the Alaska Peninsula	VI (Strong)	35.0	November 10
3	7.8	1	Japan, off the east coast of Honshu	( )	35.0	November 5
= 4	7.7	0	New Guinea, Morobe Province	( )	35.0	May 12
= 4	7.7	17	Dutch East Indies, Makassar Strait	IX (Violent)	35.0	May 19
= 4	7.7	0	Japan, off the east coast of Honshu	( )	15.0	May 23
= 4	7.7	0	Japan, Ryukyu Islands	( )	20.0	June 10
= 4	7.7	0	Japan, off the east coast of Honshu	( )	35.0	November 5
= 4	7.7	0	Japan, off the east coast of Honshu	( )	30.0	November 6
5	7.6	0	Japan, off the east coast of Honshu	( )	25.0	November 6
6	7.5	0	Japan, Ryukyu Islands	( )	20.0	June 16
= 7	7.3	0	Dutch East Indies, Molucca Sea	( )	15.0	October 10
= 7	7.3	0	Dutch East Indies, northwest of Timor	( )	90.0	October 20
8	7.2	0	Taiwan, Hualien County	( )	15.0	September 7
= 9	7.1	0	Philippines, west of Luzon	( )	15.0	May 23
= 9	7.1	0	France, Loyalty Islands, New Caledonia	( )	35.0	May 30
= 9	7.1	0	Mongolia, Bayan-Ölgii Province	( )	10.0	October 19
= 10	7.0	0	Scotia Sea	( )	10.0	January 24
= 10	7.0	2	Colombia, Quindío Department	VIII (Severe)	150.0	February 5
= 10	7.0	0	British Burma, Chin State	( )	75.0	August 16
= 10	7.0	0	Philippines, Samar Sea	( )	15.0	August 29
= 10	7.0	0	New Zealand, Southland, New Zealand	( )	15.0	December 16

- Note: At least 7.0 magnitude

== Notable events ==
=== January ===
January
- Strongest: 7.0 M_{w} Scotia Sea
- Total fatalities: 0

Number by magnitude
- 8.0–8.9: 0
- 7.0–7.9: 1
- 6.0–6.9: 9

Date	Country and location	M_{w}	Depth (km)	MMI	Notes	Casualties	
Date	Country and location	M_{w}	Depth (km)	MMI	Notes	Dead	Injured
1	Japan, Volcano Islands	6.6	60.0				
2	Mexico, off the coast of Oaxaca	6.5	25.0	VII	Major damage was reported.		
7	New Guinea, west of New Ireland (island)	6.5	15.0				
10	Japan, Ryukyu Islands	6.2	60.0				
11	Japan, off the south coast of Honshu	6.5	25.0				
16	Peru, Loreto Region	6.0	100.0				
18	Dutch East Indies, off the west coast of southern Sumatra	6.5	100.0				
22	Dutch East Indies, Sunda Strait	6.0	150.0				
23	United States, north of Maui, Hawaii	6.6	10.0	VII	Damage was caused with costs being reported at $150,000 (1938 rate). Landslides were observed as well as cracks in roads.		
24	Scotia Sea	7.0	10.0				

=== February ===
February
- Strongest: 8.5 M_{w} Dutch East Indies
- Deadliest: 7.0 M_{w} Colombia; 2 deaths
- Total fatalities: 2

Number by magnitude
- 8.0–8.9: 1
- 7.0–7.9: 1
- 6.0–6.9: 5

Date	Country and location	M_{w}	Depth (km)	MMI	Notes	Casualties	
Date	Country and location	M_{w}	Depth (km)	MMI	Notes	Dead	Injured
1	Dutch East Indies, eastern Banda Sea	8.5	25.0	VII	The 1938 Banda Sea earthquake was one of the largest in Indonesian history. Despite the size and shallow depth very little damage was caused. A tsunami was caused which resulted in 24 homes being destroyed with a further 8 being damaged.		
2	Dutch East Indies, Mentawai Islands	6.0	120.0				
5	Colombia, Quindío Department	7.0	150.0	VIII	2 people were killed and major damage was caused.	2	
5	Philippines, west of Catanduanes	6.5	160.0				
7	Japan, Tochigi Prefecture, Honshu	6.5	100.0				
13	Dutch East Indies, off the west coast of West Papua (province)	0.0	0.0		Some damage was caused. The magnitude and depth were unknown.		
13	New Zealand, northeast of	6.5	35.0				
14	Turkmen SSR, Balkan Region	6.0	35.0				

=== March ===
March
- Strongest: 6.6 M_{w} Canada
- Total fatalities: 0

Number by magnitude
- 8.0–8.9: 0
- 7.0–7.9: 0
- 6.0–6.9: 4

Date	Country and location	M_{w}	Depth (km)	MMI	Notes	Casualties	
Date	Country and location	M_{w}	Depth (km)	MMI	Notes	Dead	Injured
8	New Guinea, southeast of New Ireland (island)	6.5	50.0				
14	India, Madhya Pradesh	6.2	50.0				
22	Canada, southwest of Haida Gwaii	6.6	10.0				
31	Philippines, Batanes	6.5	60.0				

=== April ===
April
- Strongest: 6.6 M_{w} 3 events
- Deadliest: 6.6 M_{w} Turkey; 224 deaths
- Total fatalities: 224

Number by magnitude
- 8.0–8.9: 0
- 7.0–7.9: 0
- 6.0–6.9: 9

Date	Country and location	M_{w}	Depth (km)	MMI	Notes	Casualties	
Date	Country and location	M_{w}	Depth (km)	MMI	Notes	Dead	Injured
4	Dutch East Indies, Banda Sea	6.0	420.0				
9	New Hebrides	6.5	100.0				
13	Italy, Sicily	6.6	270.0				
14	British Burma, Sagaing Region	6.6	105.0				
17	Australia, South Australia	6.0	35.0				
17	Chile, Arica y Parinacota Region	6.5	60.0				
19	Turkey, Kırşehir Province	6.6	10.0	X	The 1938 Kırşehir earthquake caused major damage in the area. 224 people were killed.	224	
24	Argentina, Jujuy Province	6.0	180.0				
25	Nicaragua, off the west coast of	0.0	0.0		Some damage was caused. The magnitude and depth were unknown.		
26	Dutch East Indies, Banda Sea	6.5	150.0				

=== May ===
May
- Strongest: 7.7 M_{w} 3 events
- Deadliest: 6.0 M_{w} British Burma; 51 deaths
- Total fatalities: 69+

Number by magnitude
- 8.0–8.9: 0
- 7.0–7.9: 5
- 6.0–6.9: 4

Date	Country and location	M_{w}	Depth (km)	MMI	Notes	Casualties	
Date	Country and location	M_{w}	Depth (km)	MMI	Notes	Dead	Injured
3	Mexico, Morelos	6.5	100.0				
6	Nicaragua, León Department	0.0	0.0		Major damage was reported. The magnitude and depth were unknown.		
11	Mexico, off the coast of Guerrero	6.3	20.0				
12	New Guinea, Morobe Province	7.7	35.0		Some homes were damaged or destroyed.		
14	British Burma, Shan State	6.0	0.0	VIII	At least 51 people were killed and some homes were destroyed. The depth was unknown.	51+	
19	Dutch East Indies, Makassar Strait	7.7	35.0	IX	A tsunami caused 17 deaths in the area. 942 homes were destroyed and a further 184 sustained damage.	17	
23	Japan, off the east coast of Honshu	7.7	15.0				
23	Philippines, west of Luzon	7.1	15.0				
28	Japan, Hokkaido	6.5	35.0		1 person was killed due to a tsunami. 7 homes were destroyed.	1	
28	United States, off the coast of Oregon	6.0	0.0	V	The depth was unknown.		
30	France, Loyalty Islands, New Caledonia	7.1	35.0				

=== June ===
June
- Strongest: 7.7 M_{w} Japan
- Total fatalities: 0

Number by magnitude
- 8.0–8.9: 0
- 7.0–7.9: 2
- 6.0–6.9: 6

Date	Country and location	M_{w}	Depth (km)	MMI	Notes	Casualties	
Date	Country and location	M_{w}	Depth (km)	MMI	Notes	Dead	Injured
9	Dutch East Indies, Buru	6.9	15.0				
10	Japan, Ryukyu Islands	7.7	20.0		Minor damage was caused by a tsunami.		
15	Chile, Coquimbo Region	6.0	70.0				
16	Japan, Ryukyu Islands	7.5	20.0		This was to the northeast of the event on June 10.		
20	Kirghiz SSR, Chüy Region	6.8	15.0				
23	Argentina, San Juan Province, Argentina	6.5	70.0				
23	New Hebrides	6.6	45.0				
28	Mexico, Guerrero	6.5	110.0		Some damage was caused.		

=== July ===
July
- Strongest: 6.6 M_{w} 2 events
- Total fatalities: 0

Number by magnitude
- 8.0–8.9: 0
- 7.0–7.9: 0
- 6.0–6.9: 8

Date	Country and location	M_{w}	Depth (km)	MMI	Notes	Casualties	
Date	Country and location	M_{w}	Depth (km)	MMI	Notes	Dead	Injured
5	France, Loyalty Islands, New Caledonia	6.6	35.0	rowspan="2"| Doublet earthquake.			
6	France, Loyalty Islands, New Caledonia	6.5	75.0				
21	Kenya, Kilifi County	6.0	35.0				
22	Mexico, off the coast of Jalisco	6.6	20.0				
23	New Guinea, off the east coast of	6.5	120.0				
24	United States, Fox Islands (Alaska)	6.3	50.0	I			
29	Dutch East Indies, Batu Islands	6.5	35.0				
31	Russian SFSR, Primorsky Krai	6.0	450.0				

=== August ===
August
- Strongest: 7.0 M_{w} 2 events
- Total fatalities: 0

Number by magnitude
- 8.0–8.9: 0
- 7.0–7.9: 2
- 6.0–6.9: 6

Date	Country and location	M_{w}	Depth (km)	MMI	Notes	Casualties	
Date	Country and location	M_{w}	Depth (km)	MMI	Notes	Dead	Injured
4	Argentina, Jujuy Province	6.6	205.0				
16	British Burma, Chin State	7.0	75.0				
18	Dutch East Indies, southern Sumatra	6.1	65.0				
24	Dutch East Indies, south of Sumbawa	6.5	50.0				
25	Dutch East Indies, southwest of Sumatra	6.4	15.0				
29	Philippines, Samar Sea	7.0	15.0				
30	New Guinea, off the north coast	6.6	15.0				
31	New Guinea, west of New Ireland (island)	6.6	25.0				

=== September ===
September
- Strongest: 7.2 M_{w} Taiwan
- Total fatalities: 0

Number by magnitude
- 8.0–8.9: 0
- 7.0–7.9: 1
- 6.0–6.9: 5

Date	Country and location	M_{w}	Depth (km)	MMI	Notes	Casualties	
Date	Country and location	M_{w}	Depth (km)	MMI	Notes	Dead	Injured
7	Taiwan, Hualien County	7.2	15.0				
7	New Guinea, southwest of Bougainville Island	6.5	160.0				
18	Greece, Peloponnese (region)	6.5	100.0				
21	Japan, off the east coast of Honshu	6.5	15.0				
27	Italian Ethiopia, Afar Region	6.4	15.0				
27	New Guinea, off the southeast coast of New Britain	6.3	35.0				

=== October ===
October
- Strongest: 7.3 M_{w} Dutch East Indies 2 events
- Total fatalities: 0

Number by magnitude
- 8.0–8.9: 0
- 7.0–7.9: 3
- 6.0–6.9: 7

Date	Country and location	M_{w}	Depth (km)	MMI	Notes	Casualties	
Date	Country and location	M_{w}	Depth (km)	MMI	Notes	Dead	Injured
10	Dutch East Indies, Molucca Sea	7.3	15.0				
11	Dutch East Indies, Molucca Sea	6.2	15.0		Aftershock.		
12	Japan, off the east coast of Honshu	6.5	15.0				
13	Taiwan, Hualien County	6.5	15.0				
17	Japan, west of Hokkaido	6.5	250.0				
19	Mongolia, Bayan-Ölgii Province	7.1	10.0				
20	Dutch East Indies, northwest of Timor	7.3	90.0				
21	China, Jilin Province	6.2	550.0				
23	Mozambique Channel	6.0	35.0				
29	Dutch East Indies, south of Lombok	6.5	90.0				

=== November ===
November
- Strongest: 8.2 M_{w} United States
- Deadliest: 7.5 M_{w} Japan; 1 death
- Total fatalities: 1

Number by magnitude
- 8.0–8.9: 1
- 7.0–7.9: 4
- 6.0–6.9: 12

Date	Country and location	M_{w}	Depth (km)	MMI	Notes	Casualties	
Date	Country and location	M_{w}	Depth (km)	MMI	Notes	Dead	Injured
5	Japan, off the east coast of Honshu	7.8	35.0		1 person was killed and 20 homes were destroyed. A tsunami was caused. Several large aftershocks followed this event. Some were almost as large as the mainshock.	1	
5	Japan, off the east coast of Honshu	7.7	35.0		Aftershock.		
6	Japan, off the east coast of Honshu	7.7	30.0		Aftershock.		
6	Japan, off the east coast of Honshu	7.6	25.0		Aftershock.		
7	Japan, off the east coast of Honshu	6.5	30.0		Aftershock.		
7	Japan, off the east coast of Honshu	6.5	30.0		Aftershock.		
9	Japan, off the east coast of Honshu	6.8	15.0		Aftershock.		
10	United States, south of Alaska Peninsula	8.2	35.0	VI	This was one of the largest earthquakes in Alaskan history. The event was in a sparsely populated area so no damage was reported.		
11	United States, south of Alaska Peninsula	6.6	35.0		Aftershock.		
13	Russian SFSR, Kuril Islands	6.7	75.0				
13	Japan, off the east coast of Honshu	6.9	35.0		Aftershock.		
14	New Guinea, off the southeast coast of New Britain	6.4	35.0				
17	United States, south of Alaska Peninsula	6.9	35.0		Aftershock.		
18	British Solomon Islands, Santa Cruz Islands	6.5	360.0				
21	China, Xizang Province	6.0	35.0				
22	Japan, off the east coast of Honshu	6.8	25.0		Aftershock.		
30	Japan, off the east coast of Honshu	6.8	30.0		Aftershock.		

=== December ===
December
- Strongest: 7.0 M_{w} New Zealand
- Total fatalities: 0

Number by magnitude
- 8.0–8.9: 0
- 7.0–7.9: 1
- 6.0–6.9: 7

Date	Country and location	M_{w}	Depth (km)	MMI	Notes	Casualties	
Date	Country and location	M_{w}	Depth (km)	MMI	Notes	Dead	Injured
6	Taiwan, southeast of	6.8	15.0		13 homes were destroyed.		
7	Japan, off the east coast of Honshu	6.6	25.0		Aftershock.		
9	United States, Kodiak Island, Alaska	6.4	25.0				
16	New Zealand, Southland, New Zealand	7.0	15.0				
16	New Zealand, off the west coast of South Island	6.6	15.0				
17	Mongolia, Khovd Province	6.6	10.0				
21	Dutch East Indies, south of Sumba	6.3	25.0				
30	New Zealand, Hawke's Bay Region	6.2	35.0				
