= Damar Island =

Island in Maluku, Indonesia

Coordinates: 07°08′30″S 128°36′45″E

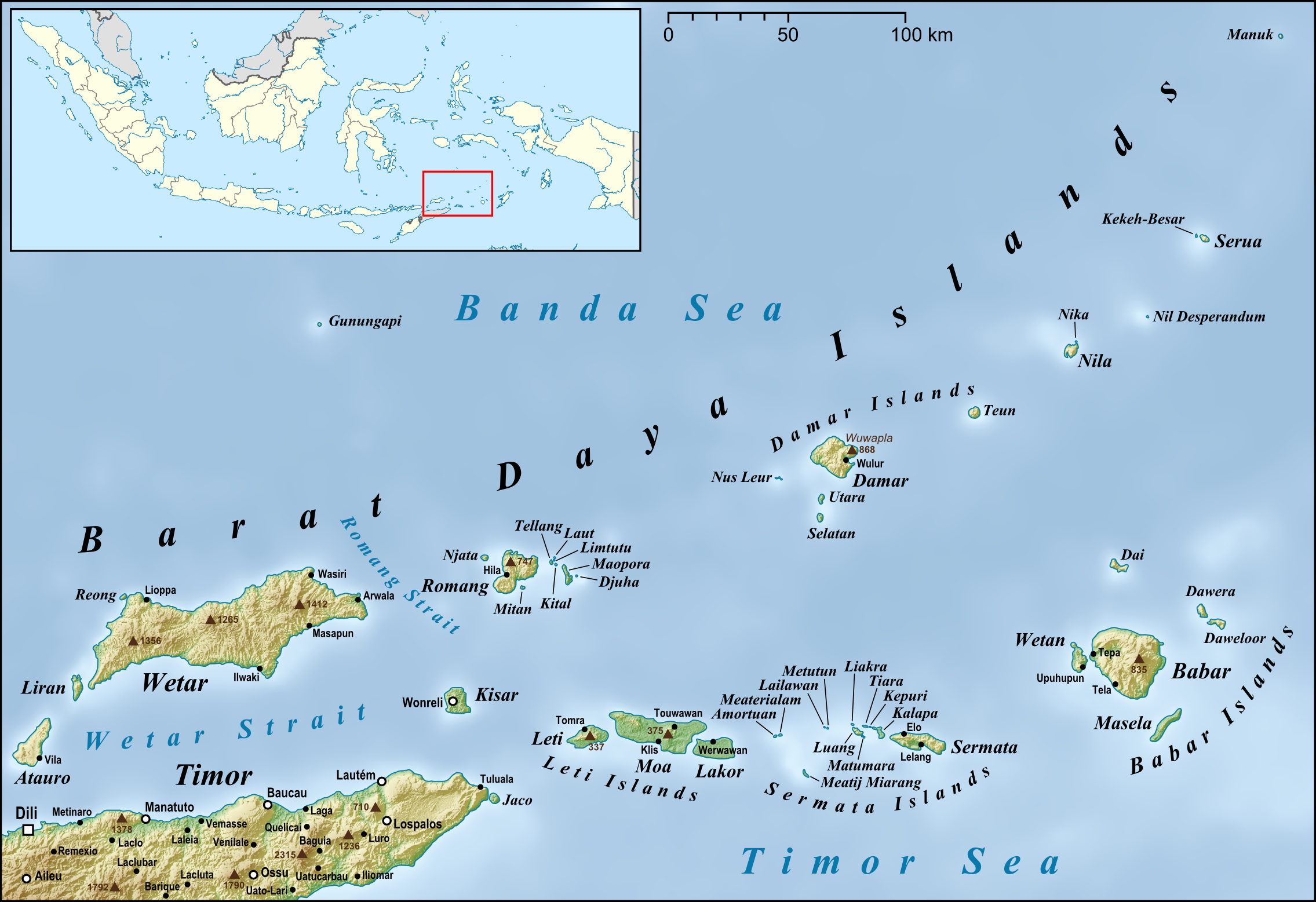
Map of the Barat Daya Islands

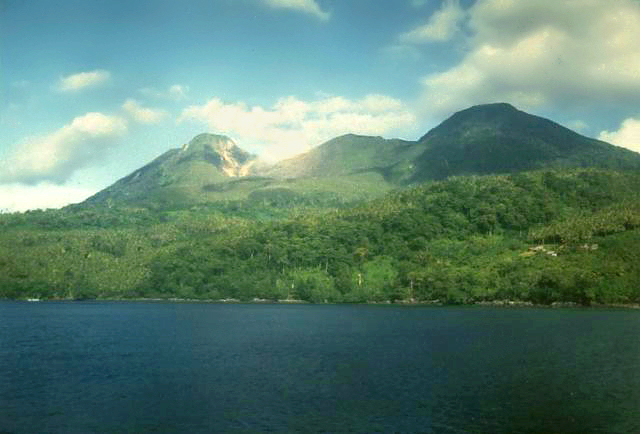
Mount Wurlali

Damer, or Damar (Indonesian: Pulau Damer), also called Kenli Island, is a small volcanic island in the Barat Daya Islands group in Indonesia's Maluku province, on the southern side of the Banda Sea. It is flanked by four smaller uninhabited islands - one to the east (Layeni), one to the west (Nus Leur) and two to the south (Terbang Utari and Terbang Selatan). Together they are called the Damar Islands, and constitute one administrative district within the Maluku Barat Daya Regency, lying on the undersea ridge which forms the most easterly extension of the Lesser Sunda Islands.

Continuing the line of the ridge further to the northeast are several small and remote islands at increasing distances from Damer Island; these are Teon Island, Nila Island and tiny 'Nil Desperandum' islet; further to the northeast and administered as part of the Maluku Tengah Regency are Serua Island (and its offshore islet of Kekeh-Besar) and - even further to the north - Manuk Island; all of these far-flung islands are isolated stratovolcanoes and are uninhabited. The island has a land area of 201.80 km^{2} and had a population of 5,718 at the 2020 Census; the district's land area (including the uninhabited islands) is 392.29 km^{2}, and the official estimate of population as at mid 2024 was 6,439 (comprising 3,337 males and 3,102 females), all on Damer Island itself.

Damar is considered to be a very good surfing location.

== Description ==
Damar is about 20 km (12 mi.) long by 18 km (11 mi.) wide. It lies about 125 km (78 mi.) east of Romang and 200 km (124 mi.) east of Wetar. The northern part of the island has been largely cleared for dryland farming of coconuts, cashews, coffee beans, cocoa beans, cloves and nutmegs, while the southern part is still mainly forested. Habitation is concentrated in the north and east; most islanders are farmers or fishers. The highest point of the island is 868 m (2,847 ft) Mount Wurlali, an andesitic stratovolcano. There are seven villages on the island - Batumerah on the northwest coast (which has the postcode of 97128), and Wulur, Kuay Melu, Kumur, Bebar Timur, Ilih and Keyli in the east (which share the postcode 97652).

== Villages ==
The island is administratively divided into seven villages (desa), listed below with their officially-estimated populations as at mid 2024, together with their postcodes.

Kode Wilayah	Name of desa	Area in km^{2}	Population mid 2024 estimate	Post code
81.08.02.2001	Wulur ^{(a)}	137.50	1,832	97652
81.08.02.2002	Batumerah	88.80	861	97128
81.08.02.2003	Kuay Melu	56.31	358	97652
81.08.02.2004	Kumur	28.25	575	97652
81.08.02.2005	Bebar Timur	47.53	1,093	97652
81.08.02.2006	Ilih	15.75	614	97652
81.08.02.2007	Kehli	18.15	1,106	97652
81.08.02	Totals	392.29	6,439	

Notes: (a) the most southern desa, includes the small and uninhabited islands of Terbang Utari and Terbang Selatan.

== Important Bird Area ==
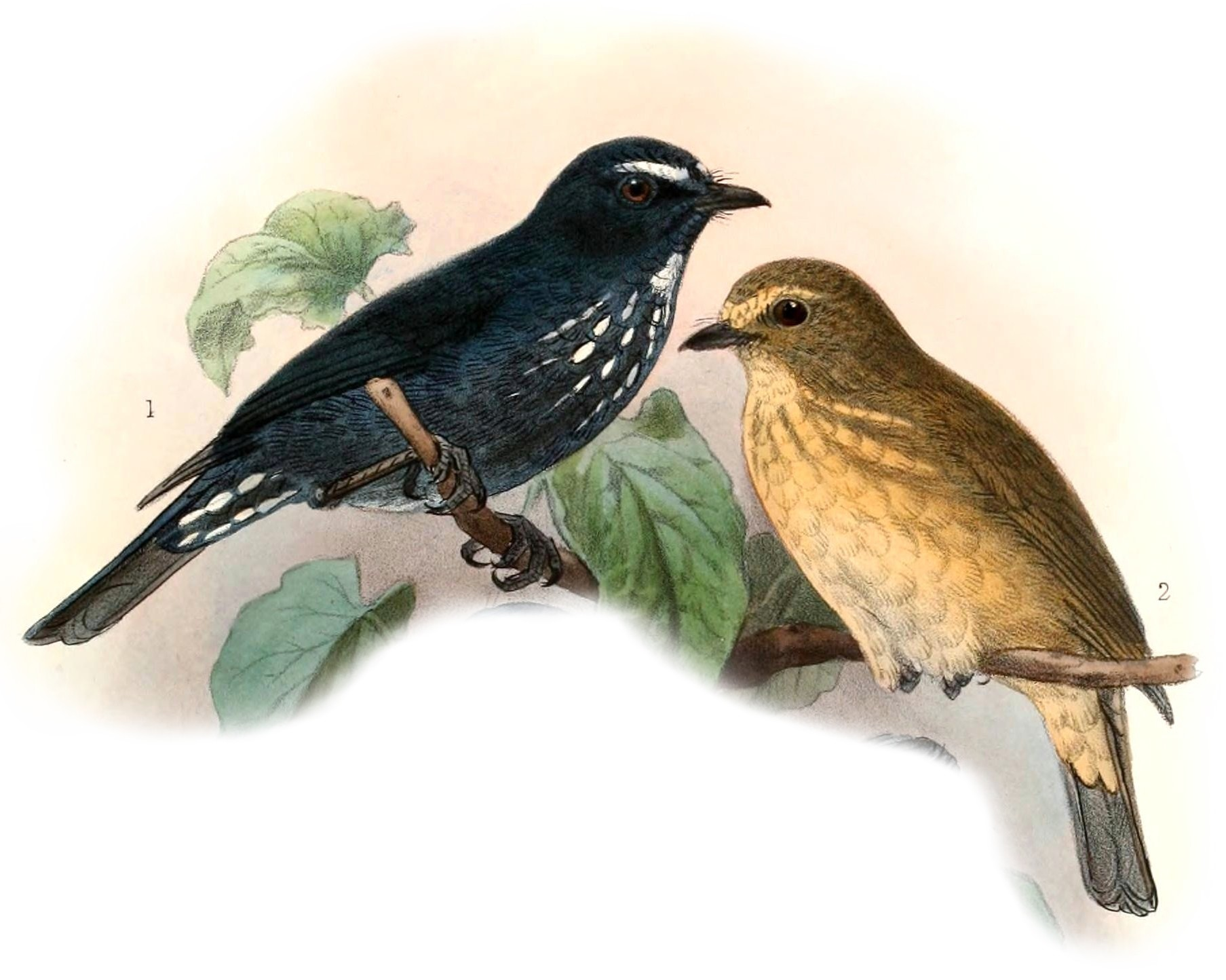
Damar flycatcher; 1901 illustration by John Gerrard Keulemans

The forested part of the island has been identified by BirdLife International as an Important Bird Area because it supports the endemic Damar flycatcher, which is largely restricted to lowland evergreen forest habitat.
