= 1629 Banda Sea earthquake =

Natural disaster in Indonesia

- Location within Indonesia
- Local date: August 1, 1629
- Local time: Nighttime
- Magnitude: 8.2–8.8 M_{w}
- Epicenter: 4.53°S 129.9°E
- Tsunami: 16 m (52 ft)
- Casualties: Five (due to tsunami)

The 1629 Banda Sea earthquake struck the Banda Sea, Indonesia on August 1. Its epicentre is believed to have been in the Seram Trough. A megathrust earthquake caused a 15 m (49 ft) tsunami, which was recorded to have affected the Banda Islands about 30 minutes after the quake. The effects of the tsunami were reported as far as 230 kilometres (140 mi) away in Ambon. Many trees in the Banda Islands were reported to have been uprooted.

== See also ==
- List of earthquakes in Indonesia
- List of historical earthquakes
- 1852 Banda Sea earthquake
