= 1938 Kırşehir earthquake =

Earthquake in Turkey

- Location within Turkey
- UTC time: 1938-04-19 10:59:21
- ISC event: 902444
- USGS-ANSS: ComCat
- Local date: April 19, 1938
- Local time: 12:59:21
- Magnitude: 6.6 M_{w} 6.7 M_{s}
- Depth: 10.0 km (6.2 mi)
- Epicenter: 39.4°N 33.8°E
- Areas affected: Turkey
- Max. intensity: MMI IX (Violent)
- Casualties: 224

The 1938 Kırşehir earthquake occurred at 12:59 local time on 19 April. It had an estimated surface-wave magnitude of 6.7 and a maximum intensity of IX (Violent) on the Mercalli intensity scale, causing 224 casualties.

== See also ==
- List of earthquakes in 1938
- List of earthquakes in Turkey
