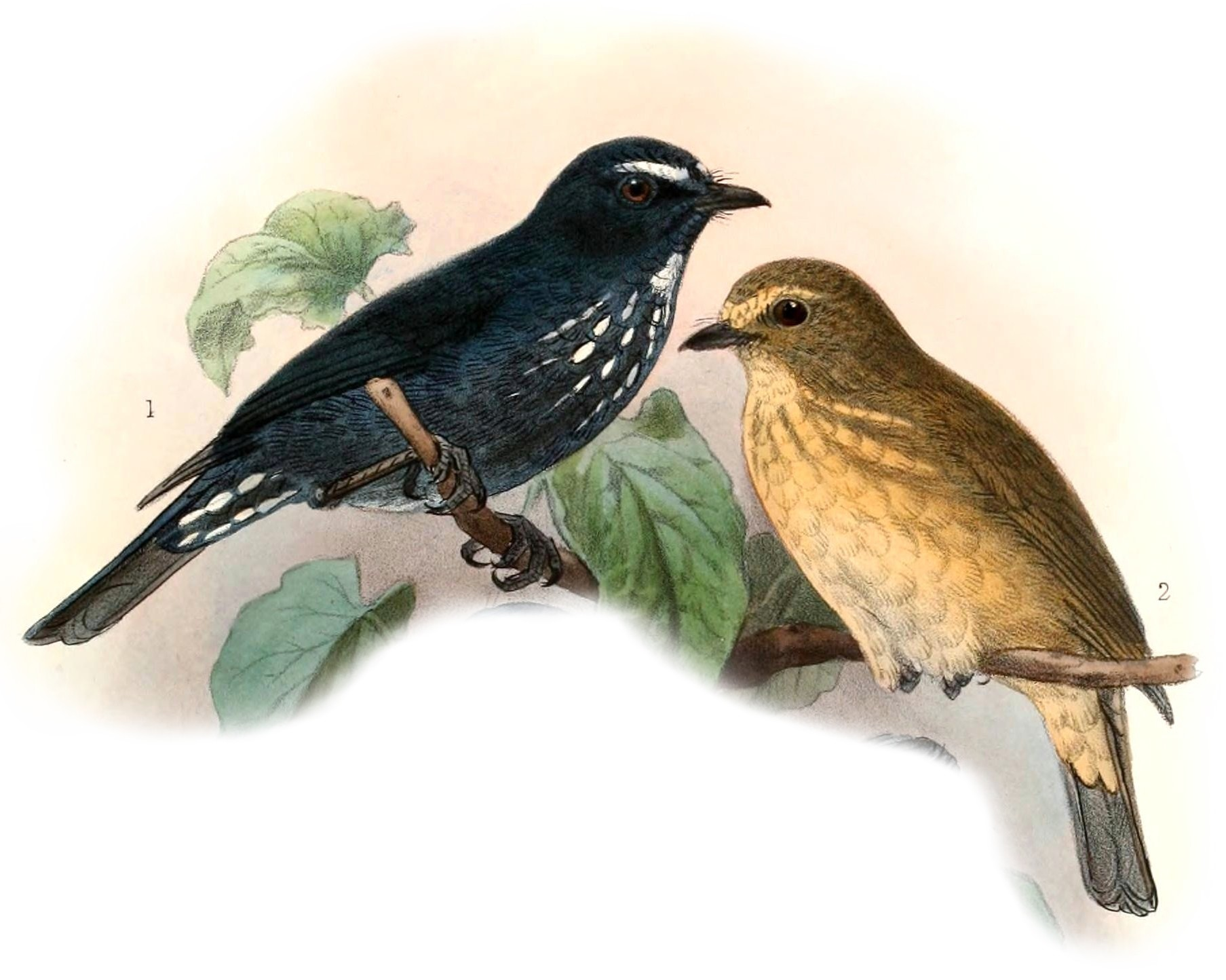
- Male and female
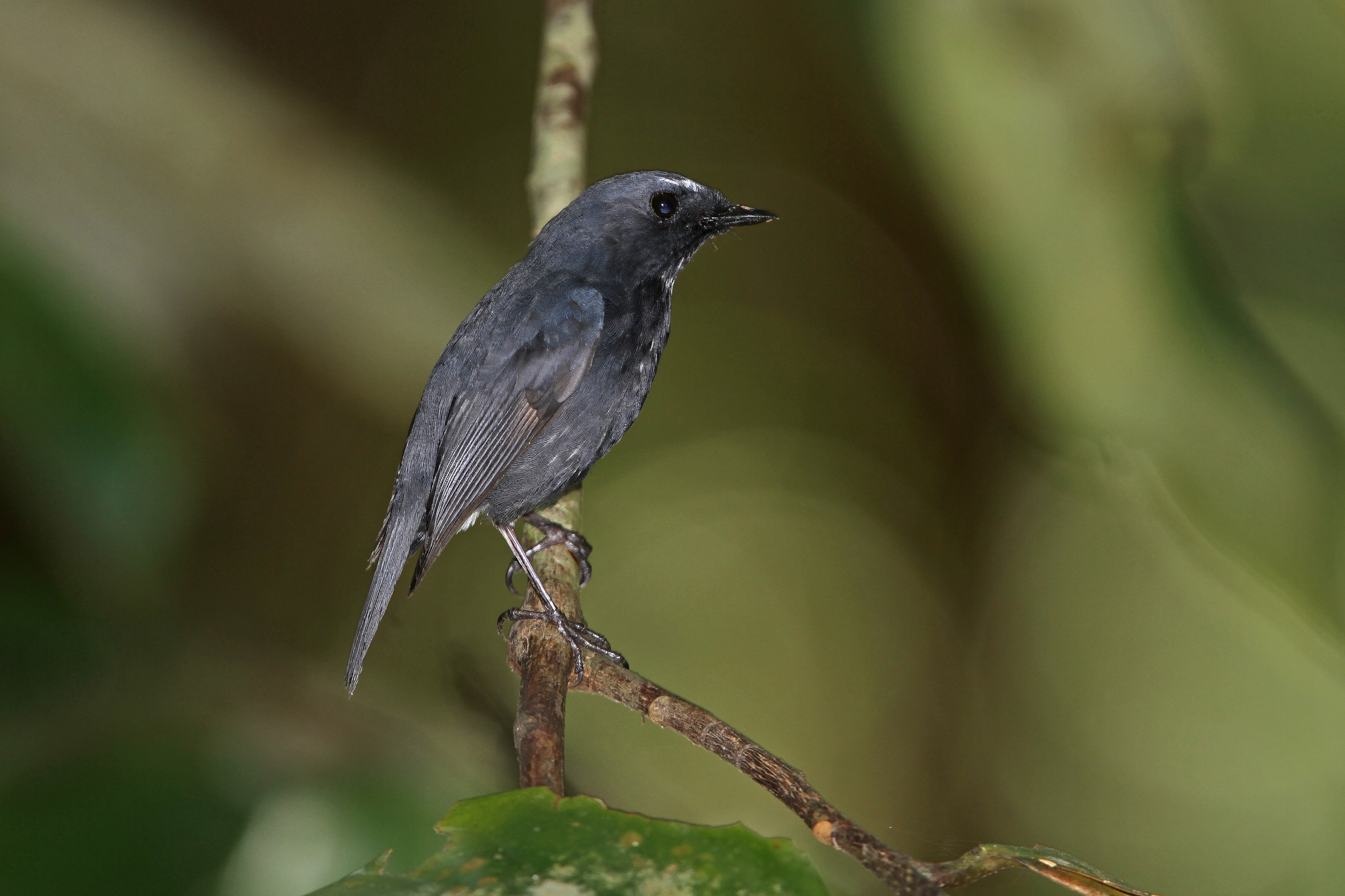
- Male

Conservation status
- Near Threatened (IUCN 3.1)

Scientific classification
- Kingdom: Animalia
- Phylum: Chordata
- Class: Aves
- Order: Passeriformes
- Family: Muscicapidae
- Genus: Ficedula
- Species: F. henrici

Binomial name
- Ficedula henrici (Hartert, 1899)

= Damar flycatcher =

Species of bird

The Damar flycatcher (Ficedula henrici) is a species of bird in the family Muscicapidae. It is endemic to Damar Island in Indonesia.

Its natural habitat is subtropical or tropical moist lowland forests. It is affected by habitat loss. Having turned out to be more common than previously believed, it is downlisted from Vulnerable to Near Threatened in the 2007 IUCN Red List.
