= Timor plate =

Microplate in Southeast Asia carrying the island of Timor and surrounding islands

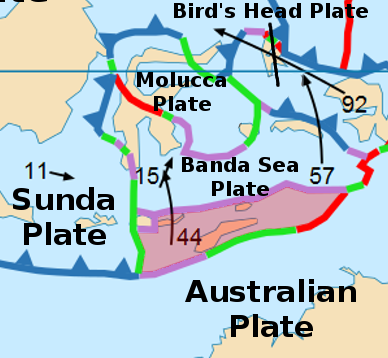
- Type: Micro
- Movement^{1}: North
- Speed^{1}: 44mm/year
- Features: Timor, Pacific Ocean
- ^{1}Relative to the African plate

The Timor plate is a small tectonic plate (microplate) in Southeast Asia carrying the island of Timor and surrounding islands. The Australian plate is subducting under the southern edge of the plate, while a small divergent boundary is located on the eastern edge. Another convergent boundary exists with the Banda Sea plate to the north, and to the west is a transform boundary.

== See also ==
- List of earthquakes in Indonesia
