= Banda Arc =

Set of island arcs in eastern Indonesia

Coordinates: 8°58′58″S 125°19′16″E

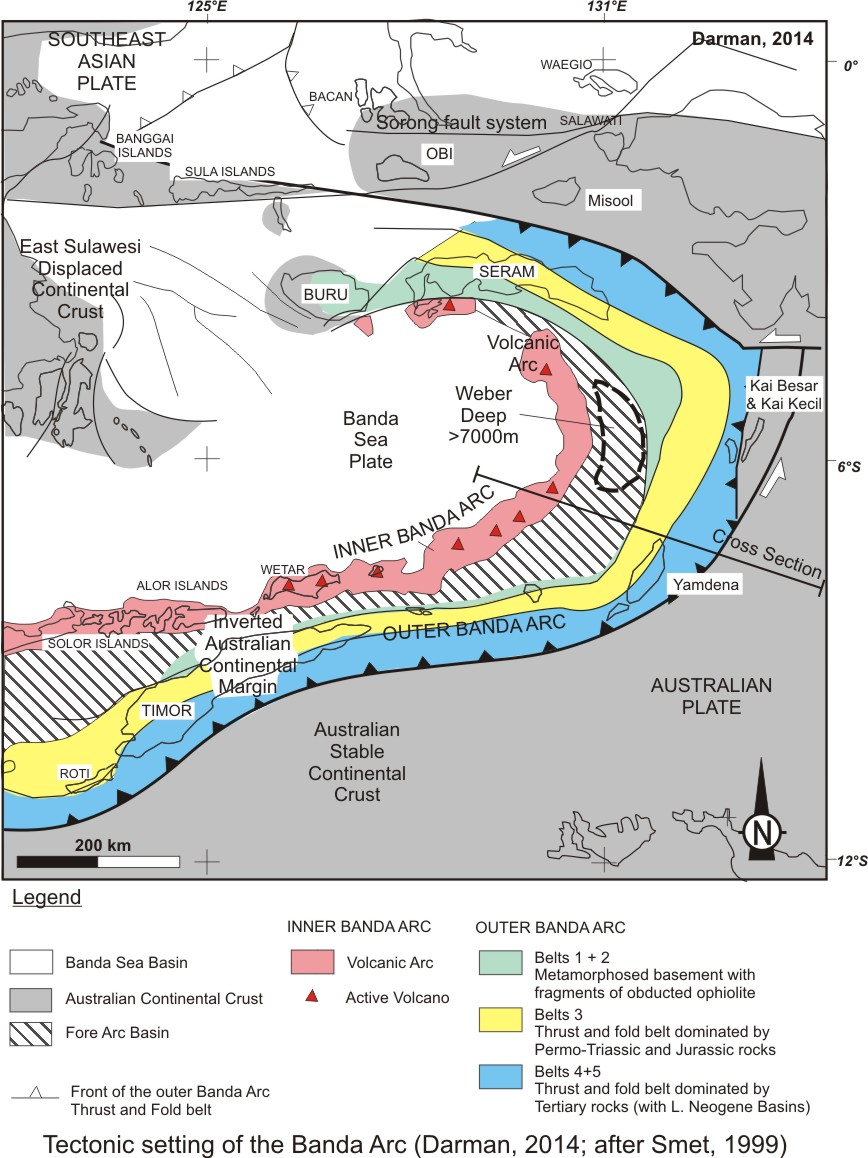
Banda Arc tectonic map

The Banda Arc (main arc, Inner, and Outer) is a dual chain of islands in eastern Indonesia that is around 2,300 km long. It is the result of the collision of a continent and an intra-oceanic island arc.

The presently active volcanic arc is mounted on stretched continental and oceanic crust whereas the associated subduction trench is underlain by continental crust, which has subducted deep enough to contaminate the volcanic arc with continental melts. The island of Timor is notable for the lack of volcanic activity. This is due to the island representing the zone of fore-arc and continental collision which prevents volcanic activity from occurring.

The convergence of the Indo-Australian plates and Eurasia resulted in the formation of both the Banda Arc and the Sunda Arc to its west. The transitional zone between the arcs is located south of Flores Island and is characterized by the change in the tectonic regime along the boundary in the Timor Region.

== Geologic Setting ==
Some academic literature refers to the arcs by location – so that the main arc can be referred to as the 'southern', the 'western' Situated at the centre of three converging and colliding major tectonic plates, Indo-Australia, Eurasia, Pacific, the Banda arc includes young oceanic crust enclosed by a volcanic inner arc, outer arc islands and a trough parallel to the Australian continental margin. It is a complex subduction setting (where one plate moves under another, sinking into the Earth's mantle), with possibly the largest fold on Earth, extending to a depth of about 650 km (404 mi), in a subducted plate. Although the Australian Continental crust does not subduct, the sub-crustal mantle lithosphere that is attached to the Australian plate continues to subduct underneath the Eurasian plate. This subduction continues to pull the Australian plate in a northward direction today.

== Inner and outer arcs ==
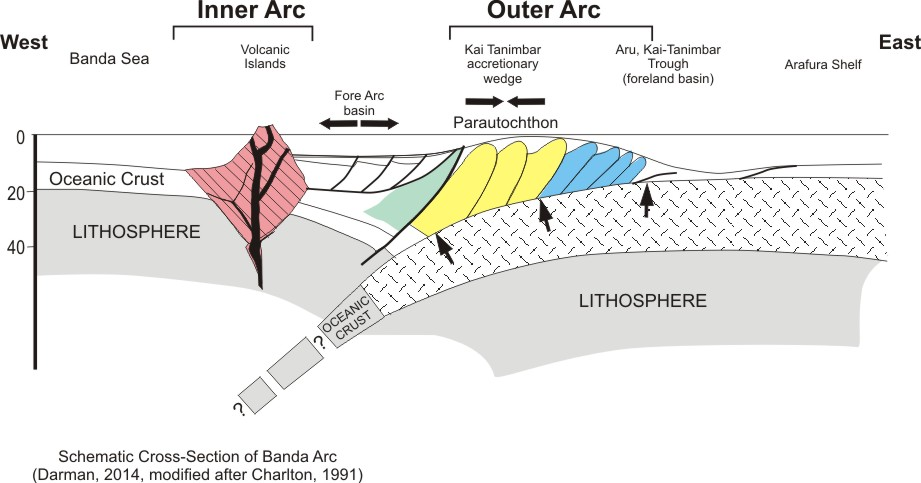
Cross section between inner and outer arc

The Banda Arc is a double island arc formed by the collision of the Indo-Australian plate with the Eurasian plate that commenced around 15 to 12 million years ago. Principal islands include Timor, Flores, and Seram.

- The Inner Banda Arc consists of a string of recent and active volcanic islands from Komodo to Kekeh-besar of the Barat Daya Islands, including Flores, Solor, Alor, Wetar, and Damar.
- The Outer Banda Arc consists of Australian continental margin cover units that were scrapped off the Australian plate and added to the southern edge of the Asian plate. The oldest sedimentary rocks in these islands are from the Early Permian. The Banda arc-continent collision is still active and converging at a rate of 7 cm/a. It stretches from Savu through Rote, Timor, Leti, Babar, Tanimbar, and the Kai Islands, before turning west to Seram, Ambon, and Buru. The outer arc is geologically associated with the Australian continent, though it is a more recent accretion than the neighboring Aru Islands.

The island of Timor provides an excellent landscape for understanding the arc-continent collision that is taking place. Although previous interpretations of the island of Timor have placed it as an accretionary wedge, it is in fact a mixture of Banda fore-arc volcanic rocks and the Australian continental margin.

The basic stratigraphy of Timor is layers of young volcanics and sedimentary rocks overlaying metamorphic complexes. The sedimentary and metamorphic layers together form what is called the "Banda Terrane". These layers were thrust on top of the Australian passive continental margin as the arc and continent collided, so Australian lithologies, like the Gondwana sequence, underlie the island of Timor. Compressive forces continue to duplex the Australian sequences under the island, leading to as much as 2,500 meters of uplift of the Banda Terrane.

Because they are metamorphic, the Banda Terrane sequences could be from a number of sources. Likely sources are 1) rifted metamorphic material from the ancient Great Indonesian Arc, 2) they are part of the original Australian continental basement, or 3) They are metamorphosed exposures of the subducted passive continental margins of Australia.

Petrological studies show that the Banda Terrane was formed as a clay-rich sedimentary unit derived from mafic continental and oceanic arc protoliths. As such, detrital zircons are part of its composition. There are two groups of zircons found in Banda Terrane rocks: euhedral zircons, and weathered spherical zircons. The age of these zircons, as derived from U-Pb dating, are 87 Ma, and 113 Ma, respectively. On the other hand, the three major groups of zircon ages found in colliding Australian sediments are 301 Ma, 1882 Ma, and 2400-2700 Ma. The difference in zircon ages indicates that the Banda Terrane is likely not of Australian origin, but rather of Asian origin from the Great Indonesian Arc.

Similar event-age relationships using Lu-Hf dating and fission-track analysis indicate the Banda Terrane likely rifted from the Great Indonesian Arc, collided with the Australian continent 3 Mya, and has been uplifted through duplexing of the underlying Gondwana sequence. Volcanic and sedimentary layers on top of the metamorphic rocks weathered away, leaving the metamorphic cores as klippes now visible on the surface.

However, the results of the collision are much larger than just Timor. The collision has created a 180-degree island arc, which is more than 1,000 kilometres (620 miles) long. Geographically, it stretches across eastern Indonesia, and is delimited by an active inner volcanic arc. The outer arc contains numerous islands, and its internal geologic structure contains young oceanic crust exclusively.

== See also ==
- Weber Deep
- Banda Sea plate
- List of islands of Indonesia
- Oceanic trench
- Plate tectonics
- Sunda Arc
- Sunda Islands
  - Greater Sunda Islands
  - Lesser Sunda Islands
- Sundaland
- Sunda Trench
