= Bird's Head plate =

Small tectonic plate in New Guinea

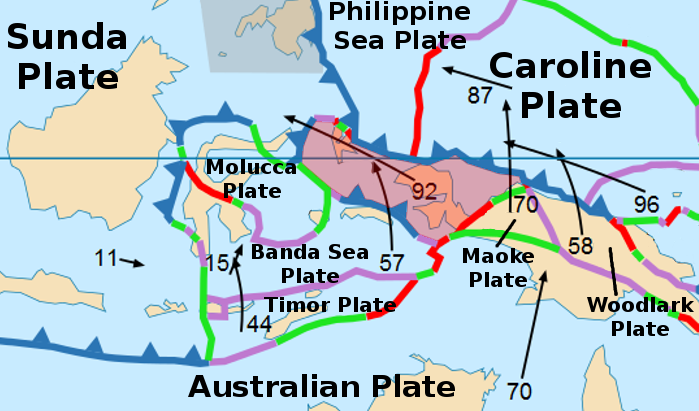
- The Bird's Head plate
- Type: Minor
- Movement^{1}: north-west
- Speed^{1}: 92mm/year
- Features: Bird's Head Peninsula, Pacific Ocean
- ^{1}Relative to the African plate

The Bird's Head plate is a minor tectonic plate incorporating the Bird's Head Peninsula, at the western end of the island of New Guinea. Hillis and Müller (2003) consider it to be moving in unison with the Pacific plate. Peter Bird (2003) considers it to be unconnected to the Pacific plate.

The plate is separating from the Australian plate and the small Maoke plate along a divergent boundary to the southeast. Convergent boundaries exist along the north, between the Bird's Head and the Caroline plate, the Philippine Sea plate and the Halmahera plate to the northwest. A transform boundary exists between the Bird's Head and the Molucca Sea Collision Zone to the southwest. Another convergent boundary exists between the Bird's Head and the Banda Sea plate to the south.
