= Banda Sea =

Sea between Sulawesi and Maluku

- Laut Banda (Indonesian); Mar de Banda (Portuguese); Tasi Banda (Tetum)
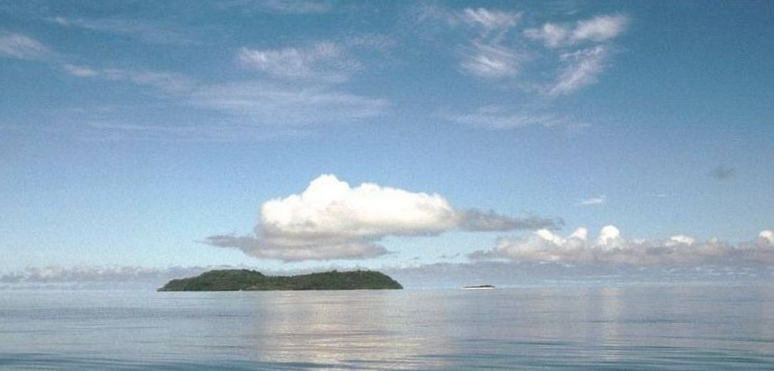
- Run (left) and Nailaka (right), islands in the Banda Sea
- Interactive map of Banda Sea
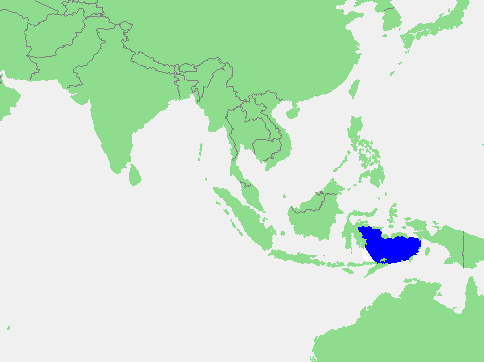
- Location of the Banda Sea in Southeast Asia
- Location: Southeast Asia
- Coordinates: 6°S 127°E
- Type: Sea
- Primary outflows: Pacific Ocean, Timor Sea, Molucca Sea, Ceram Sea, Banda Arch
- Basin countries: Indonesia; East Timor
- Max. length: 1,000 km (620 mi)
- Max. width: 500 km (310 mi)
- Surface area: 470,000 km^{2} (180,000 sq mi)
- Max. depth: 7,351 m (24,117 ft)

The Banda Sea (Indonesian: Laut Banda, Indonesian pronunciation: [ˌlaʊt̪̚ ˈbanda]; Portuguese: Mar de Banda; Tetum: Tasi Banda) is one of four seas that surround the Maluku Islands of Indonesia, connected to the Pacific Ocean, but surrounded by hundreds of islands, including Timor, as well as the Halmahera and Ceram Seas. It is about 1,000 km (620 mi) east to west, and about 500 km (310 mi) north to south.

== Extent ==
The International Hydrographic Organization (IHO) defines the Banda Sea as being one of the waters of the East Indian Archipelago. The IHO defines its limits as follows:

On the North The Southern limits of the Molukka Sea [sic] and the Western and Southern limits of the Ceram Sea.

On the East. From Tg Borang, the Northern point of Noehoe Tjoet [Kai Besar], through this island to its Southern point, thence a line to the Northeast point of Fordata, through this island and across to the Northeast point of Larat, Tanimbar Islands (7°06′S 131°55′E), down the East coast of Jamdena [Yamdena] Island to its Southern point, thence through Anggarmasa to the North point of Selaroe and through this island to Tg Aro Oesoe its Southern point (8°21′S 130°45′E).

On the South. A line from Tanjong Aro Oesoe, through Sermata to Tanjong Njadora the Southeast point of Lakov [Lakor, sic] (8°16′S 128°14′E) along the South coasts of Lakov [Lakor], Moa and Leti Islands to Tanjong Toet Pateh, the West point of Leti, thence a line to Tanjong Sewirawa the Eastern extremity of Timor and along the North coast as far as longitude 125° East.

On the West. From a point on the North coast of Timor in 125° East up this meridian to Alor Island, thence round the East point and along the North coasts of the Alor, Pantar, Lomblen and Adoenara Islands and thence across the Northern end of Flores Strait to Tanjong Serbete the Eastern extreme of Flores, thence a line from its Northern point (8°04′S 122°52′E) to Kalaotoa Island (7°24′S 121°52′E) and through the chain of islands lying between it and the South point of Pulo Salayar, through this island and across the Strait to Tanjong Lassa, Celebes (5°37′S 120°28′E), thence along the Southern limit of the Gulf of Boni and up the East coast of Celebes to Tanjong Botok (1°04′S 123°19′E).

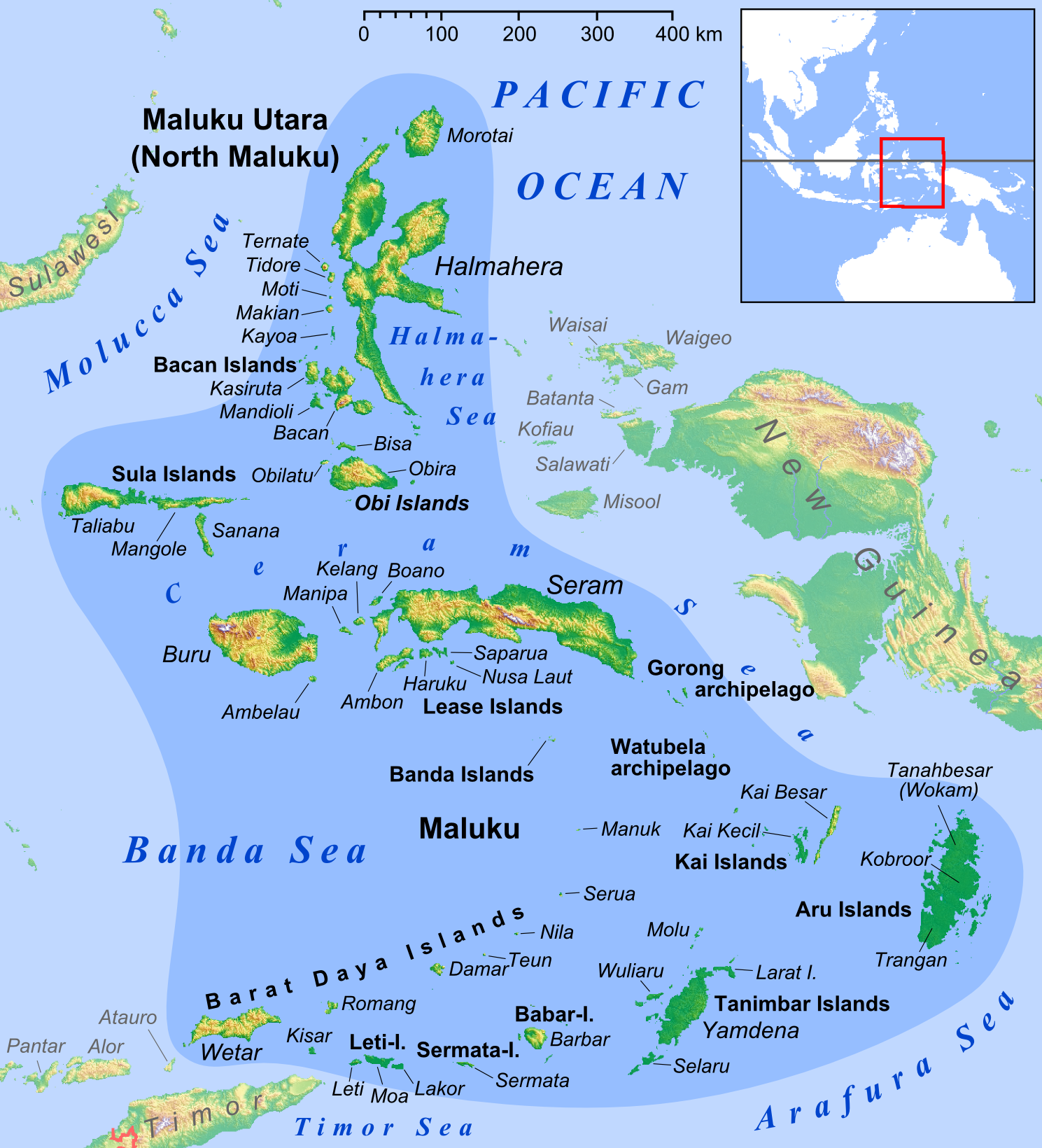
Banda Sea in the center of Maluku Islands

== Geography ==
Islands bordering the Banda Sea include Sulawesi to the west, Buru, Ambon, Seram to the north, the Aru Islands, Tanimbar Islands, and Kai Islands to the east, and the Barat Daya Islands and Timor to the south. Although the borders of the sea are hazardous to navigation, with many small rocky islands, the middle of the sea is relatively open. Island groups within the sea include the Banda Islands. Some islands in the Banda Sea are active volcanoes including Gunung Api and Manuk in the Banda Islands.

== Geology ==
=== Plate tectonic activities in Banda Sea ===
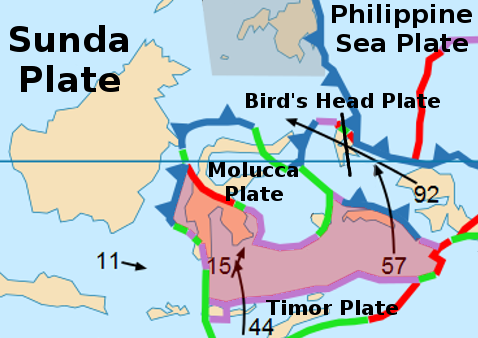
Map of the Banda Sea plate

The Banda arc is famous for its 180° curvature and is, in Timor, generally agreed to be the product of a collision between a volcanic arc and the Australian continental margin. The Banda Sea occupies the main portion of the Banda Sea plate. The southern margin of the sea consists of island arcs above subduction zones. To the east of the Sunda Trench is the Timor Trough which lies south of Timor, the Tanimbar Trough south of the Tanimbar Islands and the Aru Trough east of the Aru Islands. These trenches are the subduction zone of the Indo-Australian plate beneath the Banda Sea plate, where the Indo-Australian plate moves northwards. Fore-arc sediments progressively carried northwards by the Indo-Australian plate have been folded and faulted forming Timor Island. To the northeast lies Seram Island which overlies the subduction of the Bird's Head plate of West Papua. The deepest point of the sea, Weber Deep, is an exposed oceanic fault and the world's deepest forearc basin, with depth more than 7.2 kilometres (4.5 miles).

=== Earthquakes ===
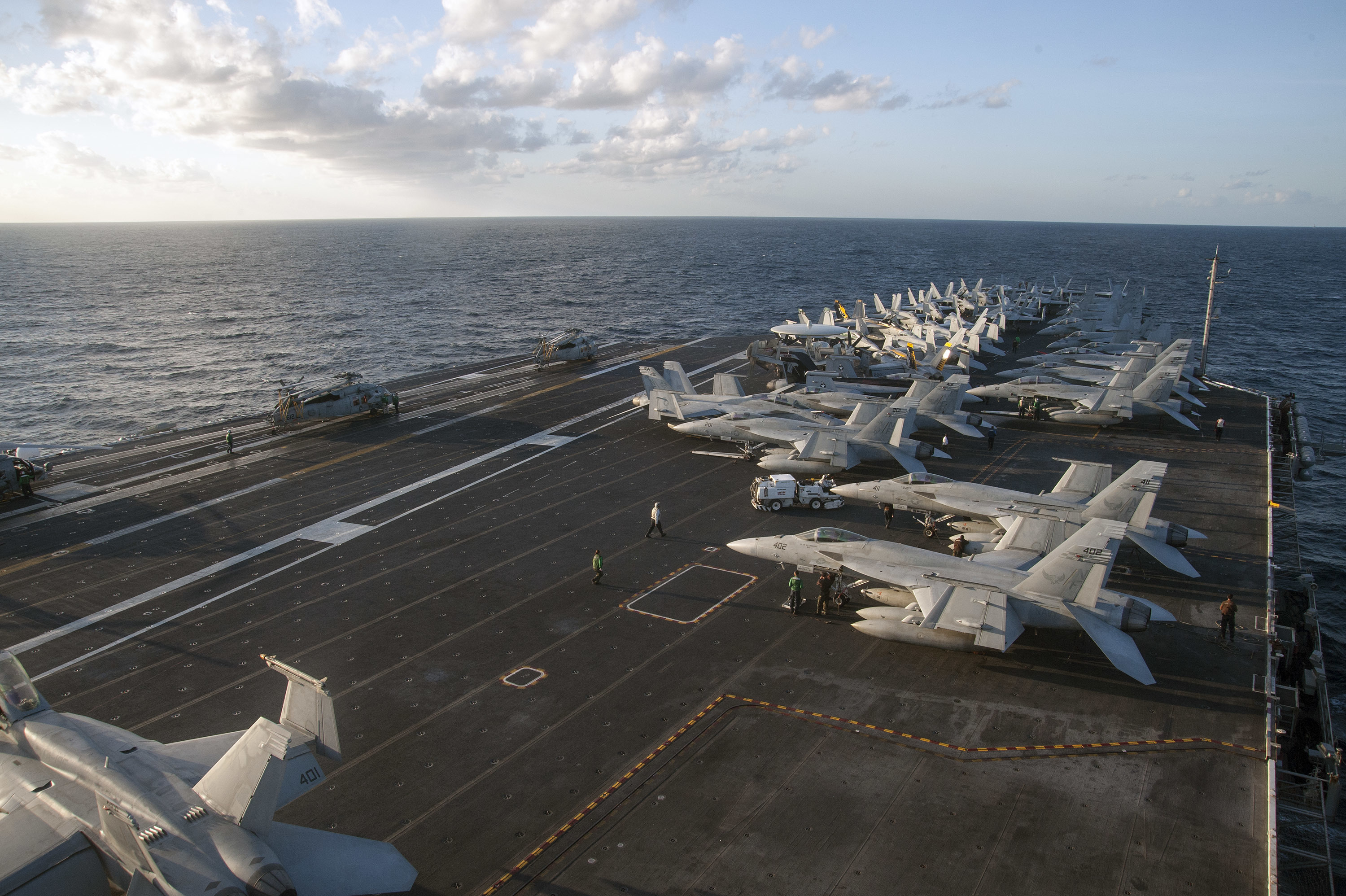
The USS George Washington crossing the Banda Sea

Earthquakes are very frequent in the area, due to the confluence of three tectonic plates – Eurasian, Pacific and Indo-Australian plates.

- 1852 Banda Sea earthquake
- 1938 Banda Sea earthquake
- 2006 Banda Sea earthquake

== Ecology ==
The Banda Sea is a marine ecoregion, as defined by the World Wildlife Fund. It is part of the Coral Triangle region, which has the greatest diversity of coral reef species in the broader Indo-Pacific.

The Banda Sea, together with the adjacent Flores Sea, forms the Banda-Flores Sea marine ecoregion, included in the Global 200 list of ecoregions identified by the WWF as priorities for conservation.

The islands surrounding the Banda Sea are part of Wallacea, a biogeographical region that contains the islands lying between Asia and Australia which haven't been joined to either continent. The islands of Wallacea are home to a mix of plant and animal species from both tropical Asia (the Indomalayan realm) and the Australasian realm which includes Australia and New Guinea.

The islands are divided among several terrestrial ecoregions. The northern islands of Sulawesi, Buru, and Seram constitute separate tropical moist forest ecoregions. The islands south of the Banda Sea are among the driest in Indonesia, and are home to tropical dry forests. The Timor and Wetar deciduous forests ecoregion includes Timor and Wetar. The Lesser Sunda Islands from Alor through Flores and Sumbawa to Lombok constitute the Lesser Sundas deciduous forests ecoregion.

The Tanimbar Islands, Kai Islands, and Barat Daya Islands (except for Wetar) in the southeastern Banda Sea form the Banda Sea Islands moist deciduous forests ecoregion. These islands are covered in mostly-intact rain forest, and home to a number of endemic plants and animals including twenty-one bird species, a very high number for this small ecoregion. There are only twenty-two native mammals on these islands, including the rare dusky pademelon (Thylogale brunii) and Indonesian tomb bat (Taphozous achates), and the endangered endemic Kei myotis bat (Myotis stalkeri). The birdlife is threatened by egg collectors and even more by cats and rodents that have been introduced to the islands. Yamdena in the Tanimbar Islands is an example of a large and fairly unspoilt habitat and is a protected area. The base for visiting these islands is by plane or ship from Ambon Island to the north. The Banda and Kai Islands, although remote, are visited by tourists for snorkelling and for their unspoilt beaches. Various cetacean species have been recorded including either or both blue and pygmy blue whales and Omura's whales.
