= Indian subcontinent =

Physiographical region in South Asia

- Geopolitical coverage of the subcontinent
- Area: 4,440,000 km^{2} (1,710,000 sq mi)
- Population: c. 1.9 billion
- Countries: 7: Bangladesh; Bhutan; India (Note: Excluding: Andaman and Nicobar Islands, close to the Malay Archipelago.; Ladakh, Spiti, and other areas which lie to the north of the Greater Himalayan Mountain Range.; Significant portions of northeast India which lie on the Indo-Burman Ranges (spanning Manipur, Nagaland and Mizoram) as well as the Tibetan Plateau (northern Arunachal Pradesh and Sikkim)); Maldives (Note: As island countries, Maldives and Sri Lanka are sometimes not considered parts of the subcontinent, as they lack geographic contiguity with the mainland. They are considered parts of the region in cultural geography or geology instead.); Nepal (Note: Excluding Upper Mustang and other areas which lie to the north of the Greater Himalayan Mountain Range.); Pakistan (Note: Excluding: Significant landmasses from East Balochistan and western-most parts of Khyber Pakhtunkhwa (like the former Federally Administered Tribal Areas) which are situated on the Iranian Plateau.; Parts of Northern Areas (like Baltistan) which lie to the north of the Greater Himalayan Mountain Range (completely crammed towards the Pamir and minuscule fragments of the Hindu Kush northwards from the extreme border end near the Wakhan Corridor of Afghanistan).); Sri Lanka
- Dependencies: External (1): British Indian Ocean Territory (Note: Administered by the United Kingdom, claimed by Mauritius as the Chagos Archipelago.) (United Kingdom); Disputed (1): Kashmir (Note: Disputed territory with undetermined political status. Administration is split between China (Aksai Chin and the Trans-Karakoram Tract), India (Jammu and Kashmir, and Ladakh), and Pakistan (Azad Kashmir and Gilgit-Baltistan). China claims a small portion of the territory, Pakistan claims the majority of the territory, and India claims the entire territory (see: UN mediation of the Kashmir dispute).)
- Languages: Official: Bengali; Dzongkha; English; Hindi-Urdu; Dhivehi; Nepali; Sinhala; Tamil; Marathi; Assamese; Dogri
- Time zones: List: Bangladesh Standard Time (BST); Bhutan Time (BTT); Indian Standard Time (IST); Maldives Time (MVT); Nepal Standard Time (NPT); Pakistan Standard Time (PST); Sri Lanka Standard Time (SLST)
- Largest cities: 10 largest cities: Delhi; Mumbai; Dhaka; Karachi; Kolkata; Chennai; Lahore; Bangalore; Hyderabad; Ahmedabad

The Indian subcontinent is a physiographic region of Asia encompassing most of the Himalayas and the land to their south, projecting into the Indian Ocean between the Bay of Bengal to the east and the Arabian Sea to the west. Politically, the Indian subcontinent is divided among Bangladesh, India, and Pakistan, whose territories were part of historical and British India before its partition in 1947. Although the terms Indian subcontinent and South Asia are often used interchangeably to denote a wider region which includes, in addition, Bhutan, the Maldives, Nepal and Sri Lanka, the Indian subcontinent term is more geophysical, whereas South Asia is more geopolitical. South Asia is also frequently defined to include Afghanistan, which is not considered part of the subcontinent even in extended usage.

== Name ==
The region surrounding and southeast of the Indus River was often simply referred to as India in many historical sources. Even today, historians use India to denote the entire Indian subcontinent when discussing history up until the era of the British Raj. Over time, however, the term India evolved to refer to a distinct political entity that eventually became a nation-state.

According to the Oxford English Dictionary, the term subcontinent signifies a "subdivision of a continent which has a distinct geographical, political, or cultural identity" and also a "large land mass somewhat smaller than a continent". Its use to signify the Indian subcontinent is evidenced from the early twentieth century when most of the territory was either part of the British Empire or allied with them. It was a convenient term to refer to the region comprising both British India and the princely states.

The term has been particularly common in the British Empire and its successors, while the term South Asia is the more common usage in Europe and North America as well as in most countries in South Asia itself sometimes. According to historians Sugata Bose and Ayesha Jalal, the Indian subcontinent has come to be known as South Asia "in more recent and neutral parlance". Indologist Ronald B. Inden argues that the usage of the term South Asia is becoming more widespread since it clearly distinguishes the region from East Asia.

Since the Partition of British India, citizens of Pakistan (which became independent of British India in 1947) and Bangladesh (which became independent of Pakistan in 1971) often perceive the use of Indian subcontinent as offensive and suspicious because of the dominant placement of India in the term. As such it is being increasingly less used in those countries. (Note: For example, a history book intended for Pakistani B.A. students by K. Ali uses the term "Indo-Pakistan" instead.) Meanwhile, many Indian analysts prefer to use the term because of the socio-cultural commonalities of the region. The region has also been called the "Asian subcontinent", the "South Asian subcontinent", as well as "India" or "Greater India" in the classical and pre-modern sense.

The sport of cricket, introduced to the region by the British, is notably popular in India, Pakistan, Sri Lanka, Nepal, Bangladesh and Afghanistan. Within a cricket context, these countries are sometimes referred to simply as the subcontinent e.g. "Australia's tour of the subcontinent". The term is also sometimes used adjectivally in cricket e.g. "subcontinental conditions".

== Geology ==
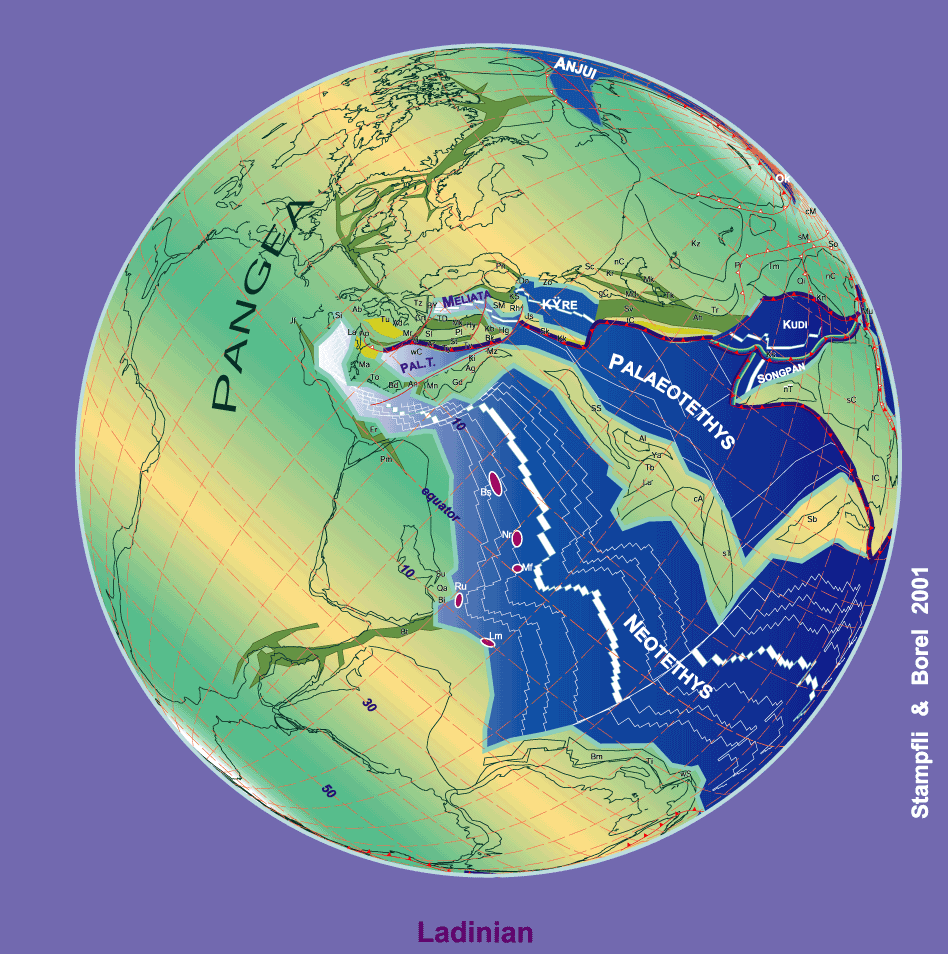
Cimmeria, having rifted from Gondwana shown drifting towards Eurasia, closing the Paleo-Tethys Ocean to the north, opening the Neo-Tethys Ocean to the south, and carrying parts of what is today the Tibetan Plateau

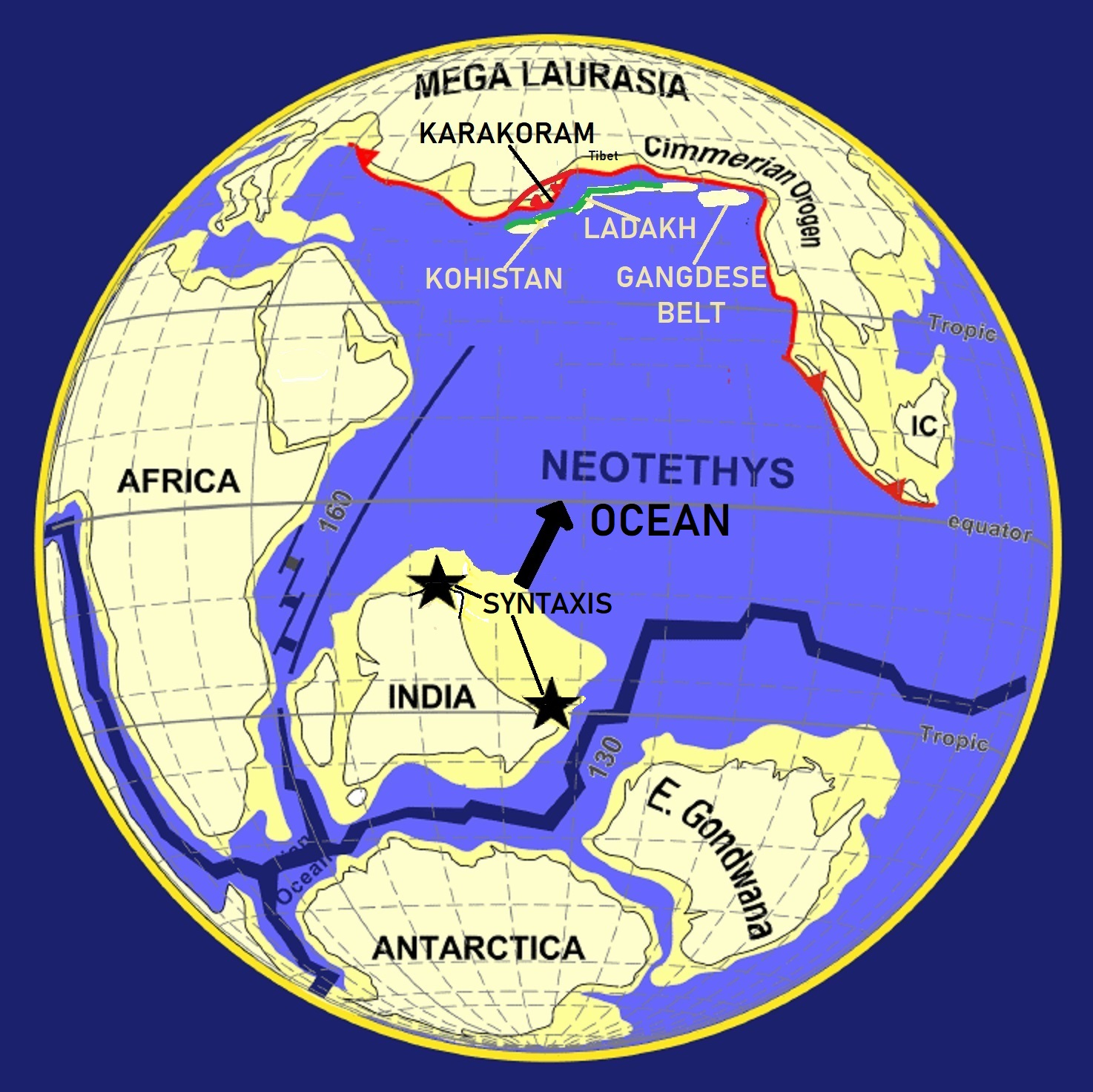
The accretions of the Karakoram, the Kohistan-Ladakh island arc, and the Gangdese belt to Eurasia preceded the final India-Eurasia collision. The stars mark the syntaxis-causing obtrustions.

Before the Indian plate rifted from Gondwana and drifted northward toward Eurasia, two other landmasses, the Qiangtang terrane and Lhasa terrane, (Note: Terrane: "A far traveled crustal block accreted to a continent. Due to its remote origin, the terrane shows a different geological evolution compared to adjacent parts of the continent.") had accreted to Eurasia. The Qiantang and Lhasa terranes were part of the string of microcontinents Cimmeria, today constituting parts of Turkey, Iran, Pakistan (including the Karakoram), China, Myanmar, Thailand and Malaysia, which closed the Paleo-Tethys Ocean to the north of them and opening the Neo-Tethys Ocean between them and Gondwana, eventually colliding with Eurasia, and creating the Cimmerian Orogeny.

After the Lhasa terrane had adjoined Eurasia, an active continental margin opened along its southern flank, to the south of which the Neo-Tethys oceanic plate had begun to subduct. Magmatic activity along this flank produced the Gangdese batholith in what is today the Tibetan trans-Himalaya. Another subduction zone opened to the west, in the ocean basin above the Kohistan-Ladakh island arc. This island arc—formed by one oceanic plate subducting beneath another, its magma rising and creating continental crust—drifted north, closed its ocean basin and collided with Eurasia. Ladakh is today in the Indian-administered region of Kashmir and Kohistan in the Khyber-Pakhtunkhwa province of Pakistan, both on the Indian subcontinent.

The collision of India with Eurasia closed the Neo-Tethys Ocean. The suture zone (in this instance, the remnants of the Neo-Tethys subduction zone pinched between the two continental crusts), which marks India's welding to Eurasia, is called the Indus-Yarlung suture zone. It lies north of the Himalayas. The headwaters of the Indus River and the Yarlung Tsangpo (later in its course, the Brahmaputra) flow along this suture zone. These two Eurasian rivers, whose courses were continually diverted by the rising Himalayas, define the western and eastern limits, respectively, of the Himalayan mountain range.

== Religion ==
Religion in South Asia (2010 estimate)
1. Hinduism (60.0%)
2. Islam (34.0%)
3. Others (6.00%)

In 2010, South Asia had the world's largest population of Hindus, about 510 million Muslims, over 27 million Sikhs, 35 million Christians and over 25 million Buddhists. Hindus make up about 60 percent or about 900 million and Muslims at 34 percent or 510 million of the overall South Asia population, while Buddhists, Jains, Zoroastrians, Sikhs, and Christians constitute most of the rest. The Hindus, Buddhists, Jains, Sikhs, Zoroastrians, and Christians are concentrated in India, Nepal, Sri Lanka and Bhutan, while the Muslims are concentrated in Afghanistan (99%), Bangladesh (91%), Pakistan (96%) and Maldives (100%).

Indian religions (also known as Dharmic religions) are the religions that originated in the Indian subcontinent; namely Hinduism, Jainism, Buddhism and Sikhism. The Indian religions are distinct yet share terminology, concepts, goals and ideas, and from South Asia spread into East Asia and Southeast Asia. Early Christianity and Islam were introduced into coastal regions of South Asia by merchants who settled among the local populations. Later Sindh, Balochistan, and parts of the Punjab region saw conquest by the Arab caliphates along with an influx of Muslims from Persia and Central Asia, which resulted in spread of both Shia and Sunni Islam in parts of northwestern region of South Asia. Subsequently, under the influence of Muslim rulers of the Islamic sultanates and the Mughal Empire, Islam spread in South Asia. About one-third of the world's Muslims are from South Asia.

== See also ==
- Arabian Peninsula
- India (Herodotus)
- Iranian Plateau
- South Asian Association for Regional Cooperation (SAARC)

== Bibliography ==
- Frisch, Wolfgang; Meschede, Martin; Blakey, Ronald (2011). Plate Tectonics: Continental Drift and Mountain Building. Heidelberg: Springer. doi:10.1007/978-3-540-76504-2. ISBN 978-3-540-76503-5.
