= Nyenchen Tanglha Mountains =

Mountain range in China

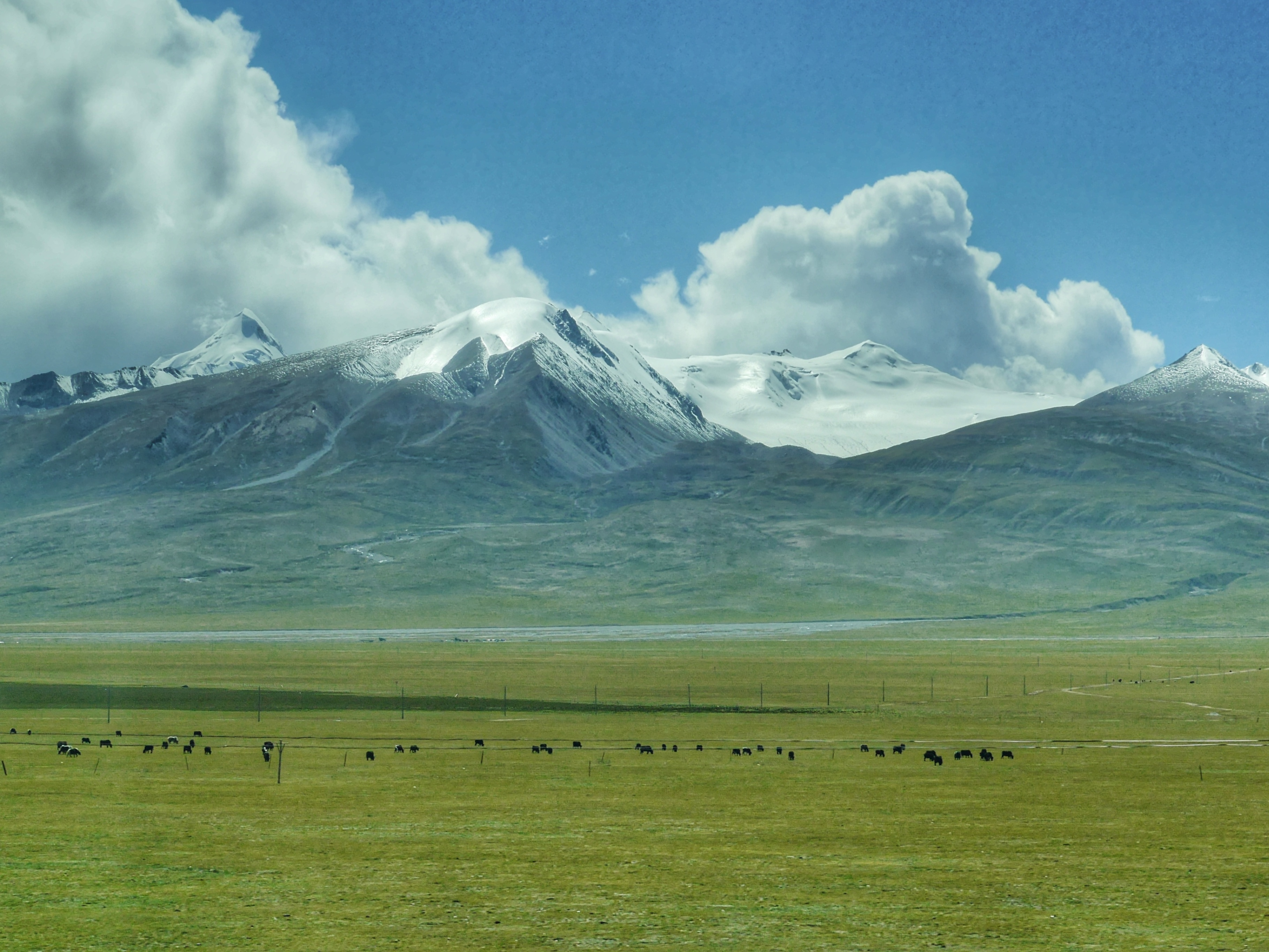
- The Nyainqêntanglha Mountains viewed from the Qinghai–Tibet Railway

Highest point
- Peak: Mount Nyenchen Tanglha, Damxung County, Lhasa
- Elevation: 7,162 m (23,497 ft)
- Coordinates: 30°22′15″N 90°35′4″E

Dimensions
- Length: 700 km (430 mi)

Geography
- Country: China
- Region: Tibet Autonomous Region

Nyenchen Tanglha Mountains

Chinese name
- Chinese: 念青唐古拉山
Transcriptions
Standard Mandarin
- Hanyu Pinyin: Niànqīng Tánggǔlā Shān

Tibetan name
- Tibetan: གཉན་ཆེན་ཐང་ལྷ
Transcriptions
- Wylie: gnyan chen thang lha
- THL: Nyenchenthanglha
- Tibetan Pinyin: Nyainqêntanglha

The Nyenchen Tanglha Mountains (officially spelt Nyainqêntanglha Mountains in Chinese) are a 700-kilometre (430 mi) long mountain range, and subrange of the Transhimalaya System, located in Tibet and the Tibet Autonomous Region of China.

== Geography ==
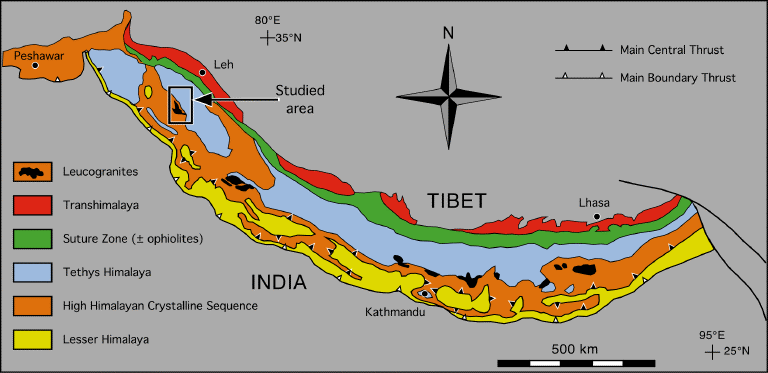
Tectonic units of the Himalaya. Green is the Indus-Yarlung suture zone. Red is the Transhimalaya where Nyenchen Tanglha Mountains lies. Lhasa to the east.

One source says the Nyenchen Tanglha Mountains range is about 1,000 km (620 mi) in length. Its highest point is 7,090 m (23,260 ft) located 100 km (62 mi) to the northwest of Lhasa. The range is parallel to the Himalayas in the Transhimalayas, and north of the Yarlung Tsangpo River. Another source says the Nyenchen Tanglha Mountains extend 460 miles (740 km) from Nyêmo County in the west to Ranwu County (the southwestern part of Baxoi County) in the east.

Its highest peak is Mount Nyenchen Tanglha (Nyainqêntanglha Feng) at 7,162 metres (23,497 ft).

The southern side of the Nyenchen Tanglha Mountains is precipitous, and falls by around 2,000 metres (6,600 ft), while the northern side is fairly level and descends about 1,000 metres (3,300 ft). Most of the mountains are below 6,500 metres (21,300 ft). They contain 7080 glaciers covering an area of 10,700 square kilometres (4,100 sq mi).

The Nyenchen Tanglha Mountains have an average latitude of 30°30'N and a longitude between 90°E and 97°E. Together with the Gangdise Shan located further west, it forms the Transhimalaya (Note: The Trans-Himalaya, named by Sven Hedin, was described by the Columbia Lippincott Gazetteer in 1952 as an "ill-defined mountain area" with "no marked crest line or central alignment and no division by rivers." On more modern maps the Kailas Range, or Kang-to-sé Shan in the west is shown as distinct from the Nyenchen Tanglha range in the east.) which runs parallel to the Himalayas north of the Yarlung Tsangpo River.

The Drukla Chu river rises in the Nyenchen Tanglha Mountains, where it is called the Song Chu river, and joins the Gyamda Chu river. The combined rivers run about 100 kilometres (62 mi) southeast to the Yarlung Tsangpo river.

=== Subranges ===
The range is divided into two main parts: the West and East Nyenchen Tanglha, with a division at the 5,432 metres (17,822 ft) high Tro La Pass near Lhari Town.

==== West Nyenchen Tanglha ====
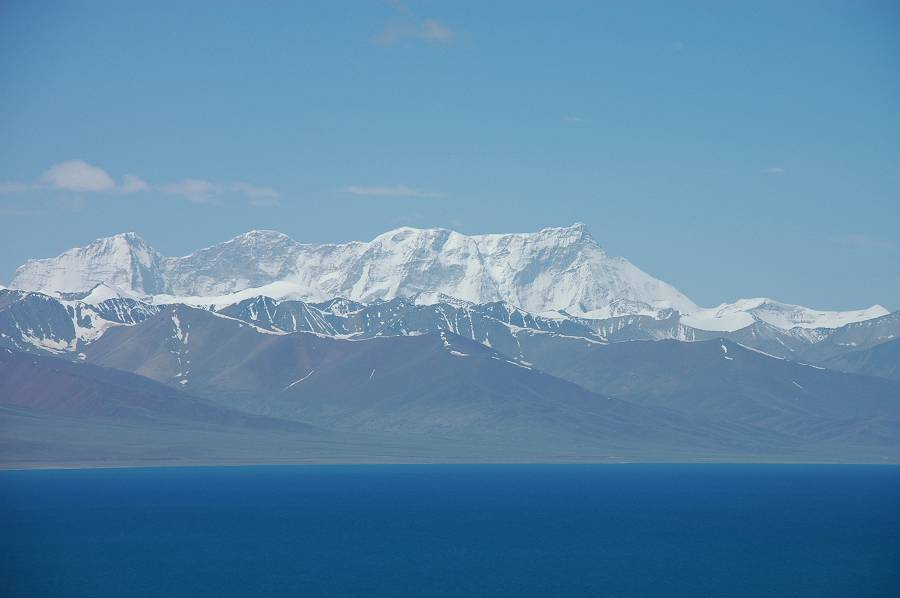
Mount Nyenchen Tanglha above Namtso.

The West Nyenchen Tanglha lies to the southeast of Namtso. The range trends to the northeast, and forms part of the northern watershed of the Yarlung Tsangpo River. The northeastern section is drained by the Lhasa River, the largest tributary of the Yarlung Tsangpo. West Nyenchen Tanglha includes the four highest peaks in the range, all above 7,000 metres (23,000 ft): Mount Nyenchen Tanglha (7162m), Nyenchen Tanglha II (7117m), Nyenchen Tanglha III (7046m) and Jomo Gangtse (7048m), all located in Damxung County of Lhasa. West Nyenchen Tanglha separates the basins of the Yarlung Tsangpo in the south from the endorheic basins of the Changtang in the north.

==== East Nyenchen Tanglha ====
East Nyenchen Tanglha, located in Nagqu, Chamdo and Nyingchi, marks the water divide between the Yarlung Tsangpo to the south and the Nak Chu river (which becomes the Nujiang and Salween in its lower reach) to the north. The rugged and heavily glaciated range counts more than 240 peaks over 6,000 metres (20,000 ft), culminating with Sepu Kangri (6,956 m) which has a 2,213 m topographic prominence and is 166 kilometres (103 mi) away from a higher point.

Large areas of the eastern sector are snow-covered. Two-thirds of the glaciers, accounting for five-sixths of the area, lie in the eastern section. This section receives the southwest monsoons, which enter the Tibetan plateau at the Yarlung Zanbo river's Grand Bend. The air is forced up by the terrain, and yields the highest rainfall and moistest air of the plateau, which feeds the development of glaciers. There are thirty-two glaciers that are over 10 kilometres (6.2 mi) long. Kyagquen Glacier is the largest, covering 207 square kilometres (80 sq mi) and extending for 35.3 kilometres (21.9 mi). The end of the Qiaqing glacial tongue is at 2,530 metres (8,300 ft) in an area of mountain forests. The glacier foot is at 30.3833°N 94.8329°E. According to the Langzhou Glaciers Research Institute, there are a total of 2,905 glaciers in the range covering a total area of 5,898 square kilometres (2,277 sq mi).

Most of the peaks in East Nyenchen Tanglha, called the "Alps of Tibet", are unclimbed. Sepu Kangri itself was attempted twice by Chris Bonington and Charles Clarke in 1997 and 1998, about which experience Bonington and Clarke wrote the book Tibet's Secret Mountain: The Triumph of Sepu Kangri (ISBN 0756762308). The summit was finally reached on 2 October 2002 by Mark Newcomb and Carlos Buhler. In 2005 Mick Fowler and Chris Watts climbed Kajaqiao, and in 2007 Fowler returned with Paul Ramsden to climb Manamcho, known as the Matterhorn of the East Nyenchen Tanglha.

== See also ==
- Transhimalaya
- Lhasa terrane
- Karakoram fault system
- Geology of the Himalaya
