= Gangdese batholith =

Geological structure in the south of the Lhasa terrane

- Batholith
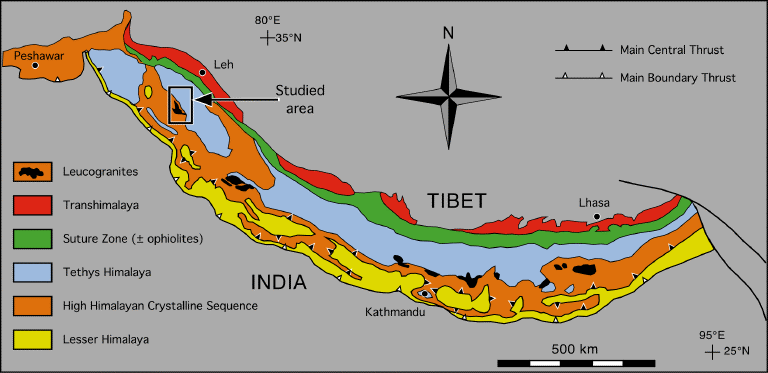
- Tectonic units of the Himalaya. Green is the Indus-Yarlung suture zone. Red is the Transhimalaya, including the Gangdese batholith. Lhasa to the east.
- Coordinates: 30°N 91°E
- Location: Tibet Autonomous Region, China

The Gangdese batholith or Gangdese volcanic arc is a major geological structure in the south of the Lhasa terrane in Tibet, to the north of the Himalayas. The batholith formed around 100 million years ago, and was volcanically active for about 20 million years. It reactivated around 65 million years ago as the Indian plate approached Eurasia, and was active for another 20 million years.

== Formation ==
The Lhasa terrane moved northward and collided with the Qiangtang terrane along the Bangong-Nujiang suture towards the end of the late Jurassic (c. 163–145). Collision activity continued until the early Late Cretaceous (c. 100–66) Ma. The collision caused a peripheral foreland basin to form in the north part of the Lhasa terrane, which persisted into the Early Cretaceous. In some parts of the foreland basin, the north-dipping subduction of the Neotethyan oceanic crust below the Lhasa terrane caused volcanism. The Gangdese volcanic arc was formed as this subduction continued along the southern margin of the Lhasa terrane. The batholith intrudes the southern half of the Lhasa terrain. It is the largest Transhimalayan plutonic complex.

== Development ==
Lhasa terrane approach to Qiangtang terrane. Subduction of the Neotethyan ocean floor may explain the first period of activity.

U–Pb zircon dating suggests that there were two separate stages of plutonism in the Gangdese batholith, one in the Late Cretaceous (c. 103–80 Ma) and the other in the early Paleogene (c. 65–46 Ma), peaking around 50 Ma. Between these two stages the Gangdese was quiescent during the period c. 80–70 Ma, possibly due to flattening of the northward Neotethyan subduction. Contact with India began along the Yarlung-Zangbo suture around 50 Ma during the Eocene, and the two continents continue to converge. The second stage of activity may be due to the approach of India, preceded by the rollback of the subducted slab and peaking at the time of the collision. North-dipping seismic reflections deep in the crust below the Gangdese batholith at a depth of 40 to 60 kilometres (25 to 37 mi) may mark the downdip of the Yarlung-Zangbo suture, or may mark a more recent reverse fault.

The Nyingchi complex forms the eastern segment of the Gangdese magmatic arc, and is mainly composed of plutons and their metamorphosed equivalents. I-type granitoids in this complex date to c. 65–56 Ma, and appear to have been emplaced in the Lhasa terrane at the middle to lower crustal depths. The Nyingchi complex is thus the exposed lower crust of the magmatic arc. Derital zircons from the associated metasedimentary rocks have U–Pb ages from c. 2910–235 Ma. Metamorphic zircons from the metaplutonic and metasedimentary rocks date to c. 67–52 Ma. The Nyingchi complex was heated to a peak of 800 to 830 °C (1,470 to 1,530 °F), causing granulite-facies metamorphism and partial melting. The cause may have been rollback of the flat-subducted Neo-Tethyan oceanic slab during the Early Paleogene, causing a contractional orogeny and intrusion of large volumes of mantle-derived magmas.

The Linzizong Formation is distributed widely along the Gangdese Belt. It was emplaced between 69 and 43 Ma near Lhasa and between 54 and 37 Ma in southwestern Tibet. It is slightly folded and slopes gently to the north. The formation is unconformably underlain by Cretaceous sedimentary sequences more than 3,000 metres (9,800 ft) thick, which are strongly folded. Magmatism continued in the Gangdese arc until as late as 40 Ma.
