= Cimmeria (continent) =

Ancient string of microcontinents that rifted from Gondwana

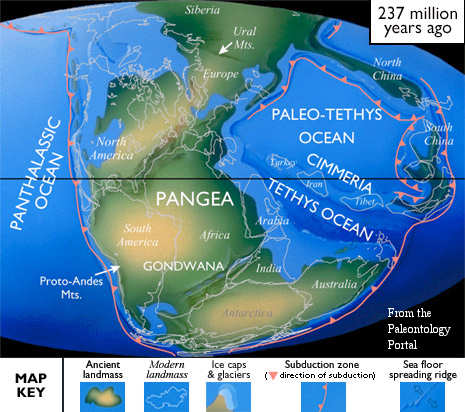
Cimmeria as seen from 237 million years ago, at the beginning of the Late Triassic epoch

Tectonic history of Cimmeria

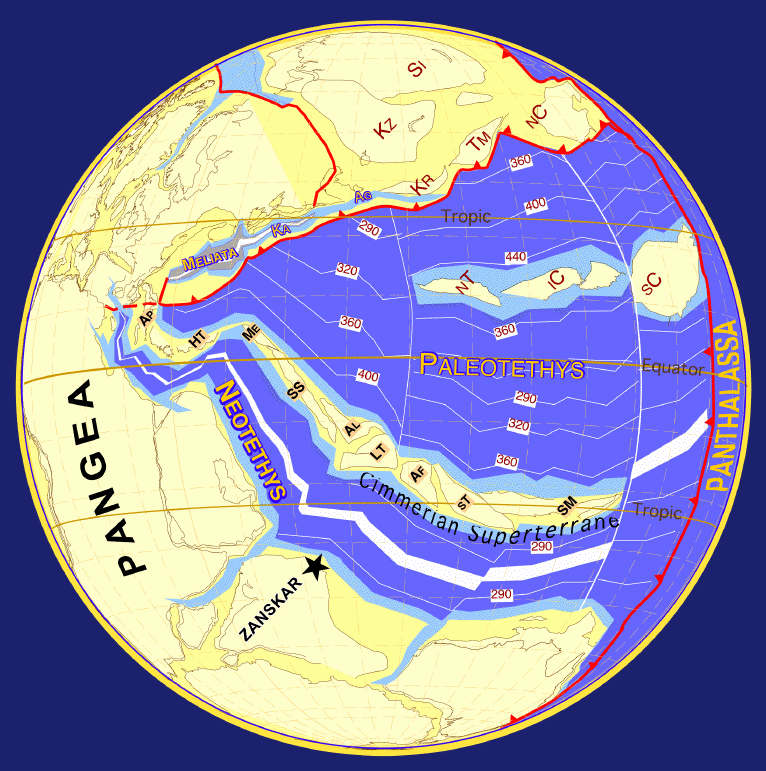
Cimmeria rifted off Gondwana's north-eastern shores around 250 Ma.

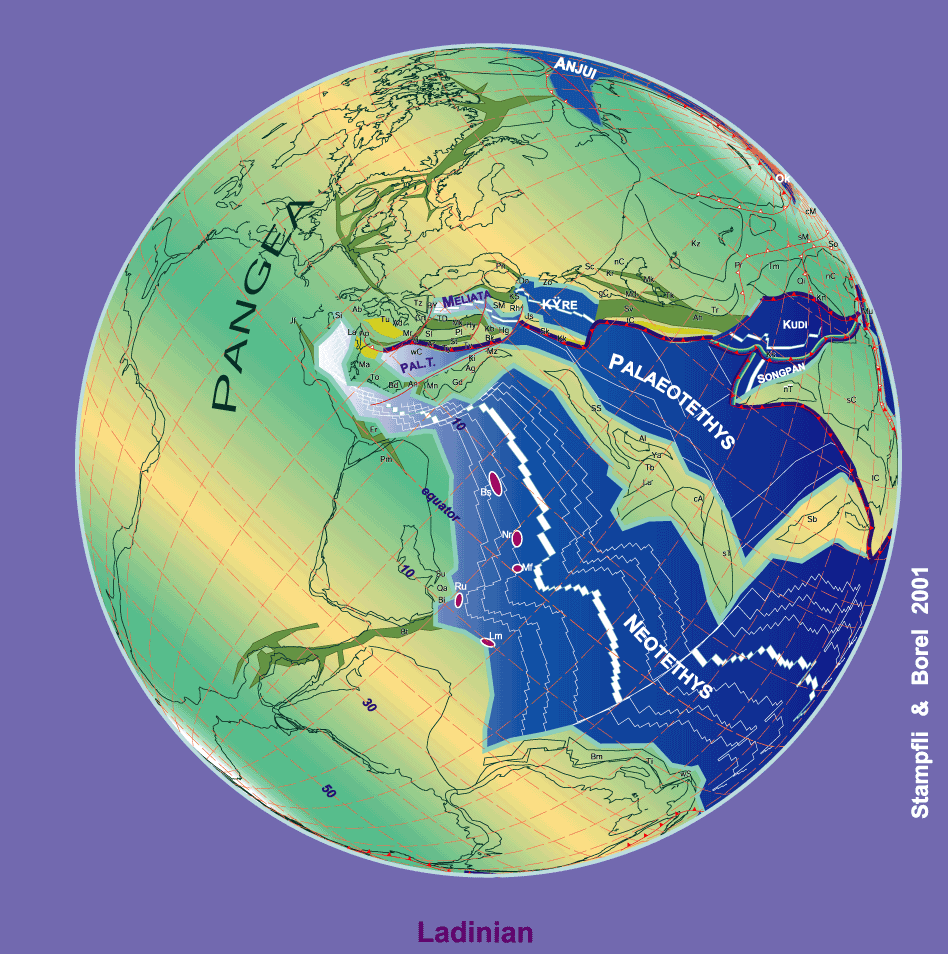
As Cimmeria migrated from Gondwana to Eurasia the Paleo-Tethys closed and the Neo-Tethys opened.

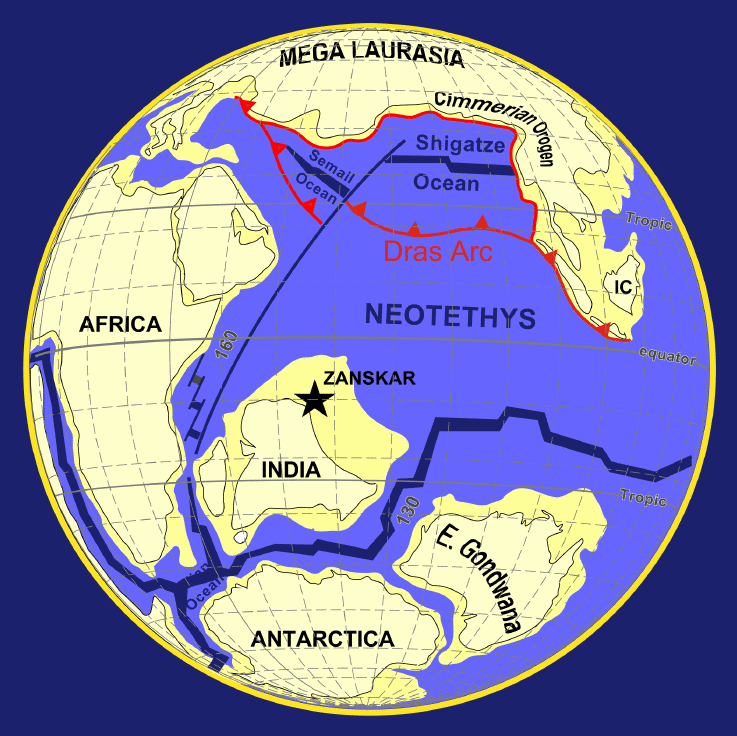
After 150 million years Cimmeria collided with Eurasia and the Cimmerian orogeny closed the Paleo-Tethys. As the break-up of Gondwana began in the south, the opening of the Indian Ocean initiated the closure of the Neo-Tethys.

Cimmeria (/sɪˈmɪəriə/ sih-MEER-ee-ə) was an ancient continent or a string of microcontinents or terranes, that rifted from Gondwana in the Southern Hemisphere and was accreted to Eurasia in the Northern Hemisphere. It consisted of parts of present-day Turkey, Iran, Afghanistan, Pakistan, Tibet, China, Myanmar, Thailand, and Malaysia. Cimmeria rifted from the Gondwanan shores of the Paleo-Tethys Ocean during the Early Permian and as the Neo-Tethys Ocean opened behind it, during the Permian, the Paleo-Tethys closed in front of it. Because the various chunks of Cimmeria drifted northward at different rates, a Meso-Tethys Ocean formed between the different fragments during the Cisuralian. Cimmeria rifted off Gondwana from east to west, from Australia to the eastern Mediterranean. It stretched across several latitudes and spanned a wide range of climatic zones.

== History of the concept ==
=== First concepts ===
A "large, ancient Mediterranean Sea" was first proposed by Austrian palaeontologist Melchior Neumayr in 1883. Studying the distribution of Jurassic faunas, he concluded that an equatorial ocean stretching from India to Central America must have separated a large continent in the northern hemisphere from one in the southern hemisphere. Austrian geologist Eduard Suess named this Mesozoic ocean the Tethys, a mythical ocean which separated a mythical continent – Gondwanaland, home of the tongue-shaped flora – from a boreal continent. German geophysicist Alfred Wegener, in contrast, developed a concept of a single, global continent – the supercontinent Pangea – which, in his view, left no room for an equatorial ocean. A wedge-shaped, east-facing Tethys within Pangea was, nevertheless, proposed by Australian geologist Samuel Warren Carey in 1958. This ocean was later identified as a succession of oceans separated by north-migrating terranes or continental blocks, one of which was Cimmeria.

=== Iranian microcontinent ===
In 1974, after extensive field work in the Middle East, Swiss geologist Jovan Stöcklin identified the northern foot of the Alborz Range in northern Iran as the suture which in the Paleozoic was the northern shore of Gondwana and the remains of the Paleo-Tethys Ocean. Stöcklin also noted that an early Mesozoic or late Paleozoic rift separated the Iranian plate from the Arabian plate, and that another southern suture must be the remains of the Neo-Tethys Ocean. The opening of this later ocean, Stöcklin realized, must have transformed Iran into a microcontinent. Those observations made Stöcklin the first to identify a small part of what would later be known as Cimmeria.

Stöcklin also noted that his proposal resembled the old concept of the world in which there were two continents, Angaraland in the north and Gondwana in the south, separated by an elongated ocean, the Tethys. Iran belonged to neither continent but was part of the realm of Tethys. Stöcklin's southern suture was later confirmed by observations of the evolution of microflora in Iran, which had a Gondwanan affinity during the Carboniferous but a Eurasian affinity during the Late Triassic – Iran had clearly drifted from Gondwana to Laurasia.

=== Eurasian superterrane ===
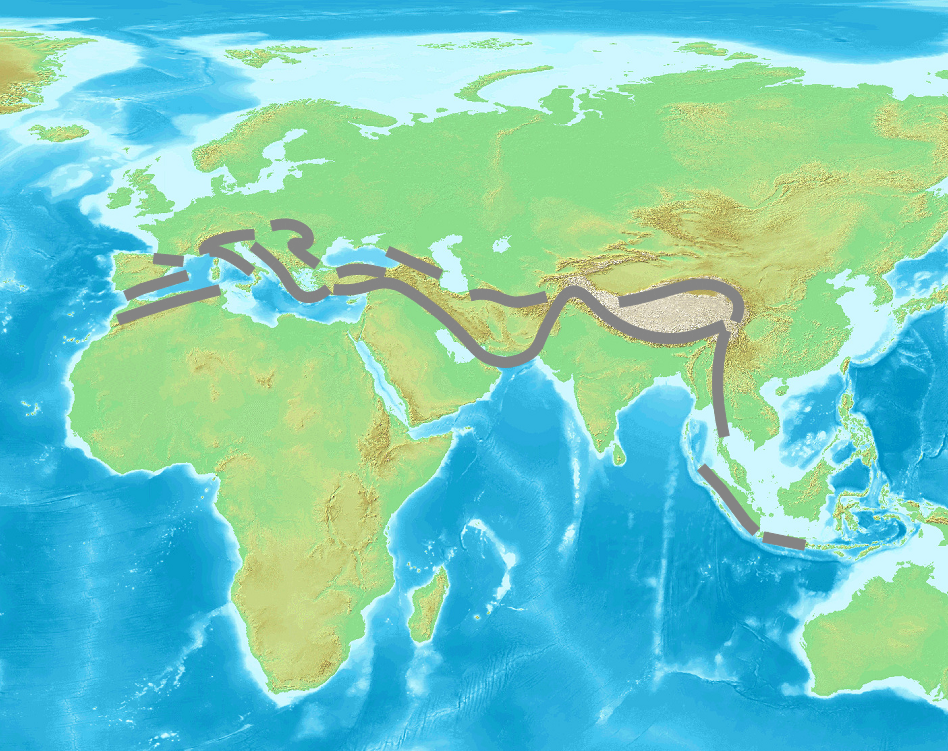
The Alpide belt is a system of sutures stretching across Eurasia within which the Cimmerian blocks are now located.

In the 1980s Turkish geologist Celâl Şengör finally extended Stöcklin's Iranian microcontinent further west to Turkey and further east to Tibet and the Far East. Şengör also reused the name introduced by Suess in 1901, the "Kimmerisches Gebirge" – the "Crimean" or "Cimmerian Mountains".

In the mountain range that now stretches from the Alps to Indonesia Şengör identified, using a simplified scheme, two distinct but superimposed orogenic systems containing a large number of anastomosing sutures: the older Cimmerides and the younger Alpides together forming what Şengör called the Tethysides super-orogenic system. These two orogenic systems are thus associated with two major periods of ocean closure: the earlier, northern, and much larger Cimmerides, and the later, southern, and smaller Alpides. Cimmeria was the long continental "archipelago" that separated the two oceans before the Paleo-Tethys closed.

This realm of Tethys thus covers most of Eurasia and a large time span (from north to south):

- Laurasia, Permian to Cretaceous
- Palaeo-Tethys, Early Carboniferous to Middle Jurassic
- Cimmeria, Triassic to Middle Jurassic
- Neo-Tethys, Permian or Triassic to Eocene, locally still extant
- Gondwana, Ordovician to Jurassic

This simple scheme, however, partly obscures the complex nature of the Tethyan cycles and terms such as "Eocimmerian" and "Neocimmerian" is often used for Late Triassic and Late Jurassic events respectively. Furthermore, a distinction is often made between two more recent Tethyan domains: the Alpine Tethys and the Neo-Tethys. The Alpine Tethys, the western domain in this scheme, separated south-western Europe from north-western Africa and was connected to the Central Atlantic. It is now completely closed and its suture encompasses the Maghrebids (stretching from Gibraltar to Sicily) as well as the Apennines and the Alps. The Neo-Tethys, the eastern domain, opened between Arabia and the Cimmerian terranes. The East Mediterranean basin and the Gulf of Oman are considered relics of the Neo-Tethys which is thus still closing. These two domains were connected east of Sicily until the end of the Jurassic.

== Tectonic history ==
In the Late Paleozoic, when the Cimmerian blocks were still located on the northern margin of Gondwana, they were far away from any active margins and orogenic belts, but they had been affected by thermal subsidence since the Siluran opening of Paleo-Tethys. Carboniferous to Permian ophiolites along suture zones in Tibet and north-eastern Iran indicate that the active margin of Paleo-Tethys was located here. It was slab-pull forces in the Paleo-Tethys that detached Cimmeria from Gondwana and opened the Neo-Tethys. The mid-ocean ridge in the Paleo-Tethys subducted under Eurasia, as evidenced by Permian MORB (mid-ocean ridge basalt) in Iran. Slab roll-back in the Paleo-Tethys opened a series of back-arc basins along the Eurasian margin and resulted in the collapse of the Variscan cordillera. As the Paleo-Tethys subducted under the Eurasian southern margin, back-arc oceans formed from Austria to China. Some of these back-arcs closed during the Cimmerian orogeny (e.g. the Karakaya-Küre sequence of back-arc oceans in Turkey), others remained open (e.g. the Meliata-Maliac-Pindos back-arc oceans in the eastern Mediterranean) leading to the formation of younger back-arc oceans.

=== Turkey ===
Geological map of Turkey

Turkey is an assemblage of continental blocks that during the Permian were part of the northern margin of Gondwana. During the Permian–Triassic, as the Paleo–Tethys subducted under this margin (in what is today northern Turkey) a marginal sea opened and quickly filled with sediments (today the basement of the Sakarya composite terrane in the Pontides). During the Late Triassic the Neo-Tethys began opening behind Cimmeria when the Eastern Mediterranean and its two eastern branches opened into the Bitlis–Zagros ocean (the southern branch of the Neo-Tethys).

During Early Jurassic, Cimmeria began to disintegrate behind the Paleo-Tethyan volcanic arc. This opened the northern branch in the Neo-Tethys—the Intra-Pontide, Izmh–Ankara, and the Inner Tauride oceans. The closure of the Paleo-Tethys in the Middle Jurassic reduced the Cimmerian archipelago in Anatolia. South of the Cimmerian blocks there were now two branches of the Neo-Tethys, a northern, larger and more complex, and a southern, more reduced. The Anatolide–Tauride continent separated them; the small Sakarya continent was located within the northern branch. The Apulian continent was connected to the Anatolide–Tauride continent.

These Neo-Tethyan branches reached their maximum width during the Early Cretaceous, after which subduction under Eurasia gradually consumed them. During the Middle-Late Cretaceous this subduction opened a back-arc basin, the Western Black Sea Basin, which stretched west into the Balkans north of the Rhodope-Pontide island arc there. In the Cretaceous, this basin pushed the Istanbul terrane (near today's Istanbul) southward in front of it, from the Odesa Shelf in the north-western Black Sea. In the Eocene, the terrane finally collided with Cimmeria thereby ending the extension in the western Black Sea. Contemporaneously, the East Black Sea Basin opened when the East Black Sea Block was rotated counter-clockwise towards Caucasus.

In the late Cretaceous northwards intra-oceanic subduction within the Neotethys gave way to the obduction of ophiolitic nappes over the Arabian platform from Turkey to Oman region. North of this subduction zone, remnants of the Neotethys ocean started to subduct northwards and led to the collision of Tauride Block with the Arabian plate during post-Oligocene times. North of these systems, the Tauride block collided with the southern margin of Eurasia by the end of the Cretaceous. Convergence continued until the end of Oligocene. The Arabian-Eurasian collision in eastern Turkey during the Late Eocene closed the two basins.

During the Paleogene Neo-Tethyan oceanic crust attached to the African plate subducted along the Crete and Cyprus trenches. The Anatolide-Tauride continent collided with the Pontide and Kırşehir blocks in the Late Paleocene-Early Eocene. This closed the Ankara-Erzincan branches of the northern Neo-Tethys. During this closure, slab roll-back and break-off in the Eocene resulted in inversion in the Pontides and widespread magmatism in northern Turkey. Extension and upwelling followed, resulting in melting of lithospheric material beneath the Pontides.

In southern Turkey the northward subduction of the Neo-tethys along the Bitlis–Zagros subduction zone resulted in magmatism in the Maden-Helete arc (south-eastern Turkey) during the Late Cretaceous-Eocene and back-arc magmatism in the Taurides. The Bitlis–Zagros subduction zone finally closed in the Miocene and throughout the Oligocene-Neogene and Quaternary volcanism became increasingly localised. In the Late Oligocene, slab roll-back in the Hellenic Trench resulted in extension in the Aegean and western Turkey.

=== Iran ===
The subduction of western Neo-Tethys under Eurasia resulted in extensive magmatism in what is now northern Iran. In the Early Jurassic this magmatism had produced a slab pull force which contributed to the break-up of Pangea and the initial opening of the Atlantic. During the Late Jurassic-Early Cretaceous the subduction of the Neo-Tethys mid-ocean ridge contributed to the break-up of Gondwana, including the detachment of the Argo-Burma terrane from Australia. The Central-East Iranian Microcontinent (CEIM) sutured with Eurasia in the Late Triassic during the regional "Eocimmerian" orogenic event in northern Iran, but Iran is made of several continental blocks and the area must have seen a number of ocean closures in the Late Paleozoic and Early Mesozoic.

=== Caucasus ===
The Greater and Lesser Caucasus have a complicated geological history involving the accretion of a series of terranes and microcontinents from the Late Precambrian to the Jurassic within the Tethyan framework. These include the Greater Caucasian, Black Sea-Central Transcaucasian, Baiburt-Sevanian, and Iran-Afghanistan terranes and island arcs. In the Caucasus region remnants of the Paleo-Tethys suture can be found in the Dzirula Massif which outcrops Early Jurassic sequences in central Georgia. It consists of Early Cambrian oceanic rocks and the possible remnants of a magmatic arc; their geometry suggests that suturing was followed by strike-slip faulting. Ophiolites also outcrop in the Khrami Massif in southern Georgia and another possible segment of the suture is present in the Svanetia region. The suture is older east of the Caucasus (northern Iran–Turkmenistan) but younger both west of the Caucasus and further east in Afghanistan and the northern Pamirs.

=== Sibumasu ===
The easternmost part of Cimmeria, the Sibumasu terrane, remained attached to north-western Australia until 295–290 Ma when it began to drift northward, as supported by paleomagnetic and biogeographic data. The Qiangtang terrane was located west of Sibumasu and contiguous with it. Lower Permian layers in Sibumasu contain glacial-marine diamictites and Gondwanan faunas and floras which then developed independently before Sibumasu docked with Cathaysia. Sibumasu's rapid northern journey is especially evident in the development of brachiopods and fusulinids.

The Baoshan terrane in western Yunnan, China, forms the northern part of Sibumasu. It is separated from the Burma block by the Gaoligong suture zone to the west, and from the South China and Indochina continents in the east by the Chongshan suture zone and Changning-Menglian belt. Like other parts of eastern Cimmeria, it was highly deformed by the intra-continental strike-slip faulting that followed the India-Asia collision.

Paleomagnetic data indicate South China and Indochina moved from near equator to 20°N from the early Permian to late Triassic. Baoshan, in contrast, moved from 42°S in the early Permian to 15°N in the late Triassic. These blocks and terranes occupied similar paleo-latitudes during late Triassic to Jurassic which indicates that they probably collided in the late Triassic. This is also supported by geological evidence: 200–230 Ma granite in Lincang, near the Changning–Menglian suture, indicate a continent–continent collision occurred there in the late Triassic; pelagic sediments in the Changning–Menglian–Inthanon ophiolite belt (between Sibumasu and Indochina) ranges in age from middle Devonian to middle Triassic, while, in the Inthanon suture, in contrast, middle to late Triassic rocks are non-pelagic with radiolarian cherts and turbidic clastics indicating the two blocks had at least approached each other by that time; volcanic sequences from the Lancangjiang igneous zone indicate a post-collisional setting had developed before the eruptions there around 210 Ma; and, the Sibumasu fauna developed from a non-marine peri-Gondwanan assemblage in the early Permian, to an endemic Sibumasu fauna in the middle Permian, and to an Equatorial–Cathaysian in the late Permian.

During the early and middle Palaeozoic, Cimmeria was located at an Andean-style active margin. Glacial deposits and paleomagnetic data indicate that Qiangtang and Shan Thai–Malaya were still located far south adjacent to Gondwana during the Carboniferous. The equatorial fauna and flora of China indicate that it was separated from Gondwana during the Carboniferous.

=== Lhasa ===
The Lhasa terrane has been interpreted as part of Cimmeria and, if this is the case, must have rifted from Gondwana together with Sibumasu and Qiangtang. The timing of Lhasa's northward drift is still controversial, however, and paleomagnetic data is extremely scarce. Sedimentological and stratigraphical evidence, for example, suggest that it separated from Gondwana in the Late Triassic when Qiangtang was already being accreted to Eurasia. This proposed Late Triassic rifting of Lhasa has also been documented along the north-western shelf of Australia where the West Burma and Woyla terranes eventually separated from Gondwana in the Late Jurassic.

Today the Bangong suture separates the Lhasa terrane from the Qiangtang terrane.

== Economic importance ==
The present remains of Cimmeria, as a result of the massive uplifting of its continental crust, are unusually rich in a number of rare chalcophile elements. Apart from the Altiplano in Bolivia, almost all the world's deposits of antimony as stibnite are found in Cimmeria, with the major mines being in Turkey, Yunnan and Thailand. The major deposits of tin are also found in Malaysia and Thailand, whilst Turkey also has major deposits of chromite ore.

== See also ==
- Alpide belt – Belt of Eurasian mountain ranges
- Cathaysia – Late Paleozoic microcontinent
- Cimmerian Orogeny – Orogeny during the Triassic Period
- Panjal Traps – Large igneous province from the early to middle Permian
- Permian–Triassic extinction event – Earth's most severe extinction event
- South China Craton – Precambrian continental block located in China
