= Bangong =

Bangong may refer to:

- Bangong Lake, or Pangong Tso, lake at the border of China and India
- Bangong suture, suture in the central Tibet conjugate fault zone
