= Thusa Kangri =

Mountain peak

- Location within India Location within Ladakh

Highest point
- Elevation: 6,659 m (21,847 ft)
- Prominence: 980 m (3,220 ft)
- Coordinates: 34°59′30″N 77°13′33″E

Geography
- Location: Ladakh

Climbing
- First ascent: No records

Thusa Kangri is a mountain peak located at 6,659 m (21,847 ft) above sea level in the Indian territory of Ladakh, far west of the Transhimalaya.

== Location ==
The peak is located in the east of Thasa Glacier, and southwest of South Kailas Glacier. The prominence is at 980 m (3,220 ft).
