= High pressure metamorphic terranes along the Bangong-Nujiang Suture Zone =

Geological features

High pressure terranes along the ~1200 km long east-west trending Bangong-Nujiang suture zone (BNS) on the Tibetan Plateau have been extensively mapped and studied. Understanding the geodynamic processes in which these terranes are created is key to understanding the development and subsequent deformation of the BNS and Eurasian deformation as a whole.

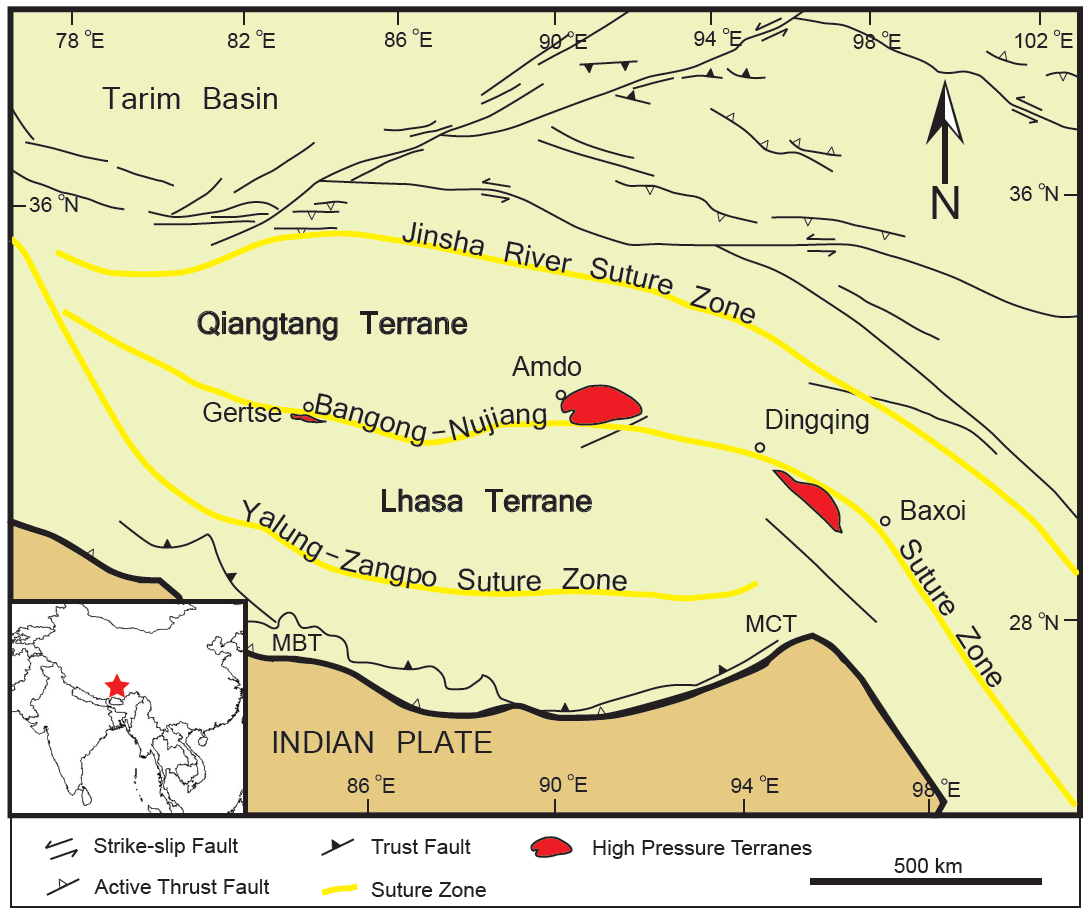
General map of central Tibet. High pressure terranes along the Bangong-Nujiang suture zone are highlighted in red: Bangong Lake-Gertse (western sector), Dongqiao-Amdo (middle sector), and Dingqing-Nujiang.

== Introduction ==
With an average elevation of just above 5,000 m, the Tibetan Plateau is the largest elevated region on Earth. Explaining how such a large area (2.5 million km^{2}) can have such high elevations has perplexed geologists for some time. It is known that significant tectonic activity took place before the Indo-Asian collision as terranes were being accreted onto the Eurasian plate during the Late Jurassic-Early Cretaceous, but the extent of deformation and the influence these earlier tectonic events had on the subsequent evolution of the Tibetan Plateau is poorly understood. In search of clues, geologists have looked to the high pressure terranes outcropping along suture zones to find answers. The Bangong-Nujiang suture, in particular, features extensive high pressure terranes throughout much of its length.

== Development of high pressure terranes ==
There are multiple processes that can lead to the development of high pressure terranes. First, upper crustal rocks have to be carried to great depths, nearing the mantle boundary. This could be accomplished by continental margin subduction, microcontinent subduction, sediment subduction, intracontinental subduction, subduction erosion, or foundering of a crustal root. After burial at depth, these continental rocks can then return to the surface through:

eduction - the process where a slab of continental crust is subducted due to being attached to a denser subducting oceanic plate, and at some point, the downward slab pull force exceeds the strength of the slab, thus causing necking and detachment to occur, and the positive buoyancy of the continental slab leads to its exhumation.

microplate rotation - exhumation of continental crust through the process of the subducting plate reversing in motion and rotating due to changing boundary conditions.

crustal stacking - extrusion of weak buoyant material due to the detachment of two layers, a weak buoyant layer atop a stronger negatively buoyant layer, once buoyancy forces exceed slab pull.

slab rollback - if the subducting oceanic lithosphere rolls back at a faster rate than plate convergence, extension occurs, allowing for buoyant continental crust detach and exhume to the surface.

channel flow - exhumation of continental material through a confined channel. The material undergoes circulation caused by tractions at the base of the channel and through the relative buoyancy of the material within the confined channel.

transmantle diapirs - Diapiric ascent of material derived from subduction erosion.

Each of these separate geodynamic processes for formation and exhumation of high pressure terranes leave certain structural, petrological, and chronological fingerprints. For example, slab rollback predicts, structurally, a microcontinent with thrust faulting at the base, petrologically, it is associated with back-arc spreading, and chronologically, subduction to exhumation may take approximately 15 million years with a monotonic down-dip gradient in ages. The size of the high pressure terrane is inversely proportional to the speed of exhumation, and these reflect the stage of continental collision. Along the BNS, these terranes are variable in size, thus would have had differences in the timing of exhumation.

== Bangong-Nujiang Suture Zone ==
The Bangong-Nujiang Suture is a ~1200 km long east-west trending zone that separates the Lhasa and Qiangtang terranes. It can be divided into three parts: Bangong Lake-Gertse (western sector), Dongqiao-Amdo (middle sector), and Dingqing-Nujiang (eastern sector). During the Middle to Late Jurassic, northward subduction of the Meso-Tethys Ocean between the Lhasa and Qiangtang terranes ceased, and during the Early Cretaceous, the Lhasa terrane began underthrusting beneath the Qiangtang terrane. Traces of the Meso-Tethys Ocean are left as fragments of obducted ophiolites within serpentinite-matrix mélange scattered along the BNS.

== Types of high pressure rocks associated with suture zones ==
Generalized ophiolite sequence. Ophiolites are fragments of oceanic crust that appear sporadically along the BNS.

=== Ophiolites ===
Ophiolites are fragments of oceanic crust as well as upper mantle material that become tectonically emplaced onto continents during orogenic events, and their occurrence is generally along suture zones. A typical ophiolitic suite contains peridotite and harzburgite, layered gabbro, sheeted dykes, pillow basalts, and pelagic sediments.

=== Serpentinites ===
Serpentinites are hydrated (15-16 wt.% H_{2}O) ultramafic rocks that are composed of predominately serpentine, a weak and buoyant mineral with a broad P-T stability field, and are generally associated with subduction zones. Protoliths of serpentinites are olivine- and pyroxene-dominated. The formation of serpentinites is caused by the release of fluids from subducting hydrated oceanic slabs as they become heated with depth to a maximum temperature of 650-700 °C.

=== Eclogites ===
Eclogites are high-pressure (HP) to ultrahigh-pressure (UHP) metamorphic rocks that are indicative of subduction zone metamorphism. The eclogites in central Tibet are of Early Mesozoic origin, and they appear to be the result of diachronous collision between the eastern Qiangtang terrane and the western Qiangtang-Lhasa plate, along the linked eastern Bangong-Nujiang-central Qiangtang zone.

== High pressure terranes along the Bangong-Nujiang suture ==
=== Gertse: Bangong Lake-Gertse (western sector) ===
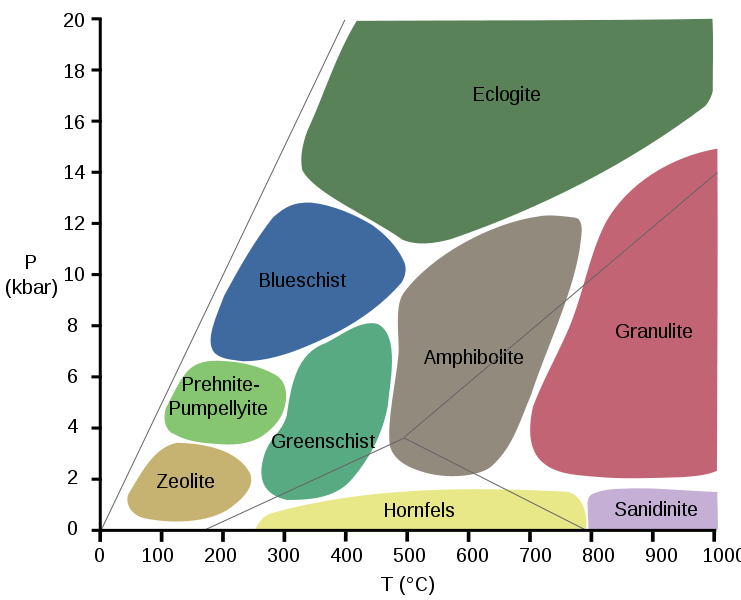
Metamorphic Facies Diagram. Amphibolite-facies, greenschist-facies, and eclogite-facies metamorphism have been observed throughout central Tibet.

Located along the western sector of the BNS in central Tibet, the Gertse area contains two main isolated occurrences of ophiolitic outcrops – the Dong Tso and Lagkor Tso. East of Gertse, the Dong Tso ophiolite crops out in the Lhasa terrane and is preserved in a series of imbricate thrust slices, and the Lagkor Tso occurs further to the south. Amphibolite-facies metamorphic blocks occurring within a serpentinite-matrix mélange have also been discovered in the area. Geochemical studies conducted on these amphibolites have shown mid-ocean ridge basalt (MORB) geochemical characteristics for the Dong Tso area and arc-like geochemical characteristics for Lagkor Tso.

==== Dong Tso ====
The Dong Tso ophiolitic suite includes metaperidotites and harzburgites, serpentinites, isotropic and layered gabbros, sheeted dykes, pillow basalts, and minor amounts of chert. Geochemical data of the peridotites at Dong Tso indicate that they have supra subduction zone characteristics. The serpentinites have undergone silica-carbonate alteration predominately along major fault zones, but these alterations can be found in nearby areas as well. Dating of a gabbro sample associated with the ophiolitic suite has yielded an Sm–Nd age of 191 ± 22 Ma, however, using the U/Pb SHRIMP technique on zircons from a gabbro sample north of Dong Tso has yielded a Middle Jurassic age. Geochemical analysis on Dong Tso amphibolites have indicated that these amphibolites have MORB-like characteristics, and the presence of ophiolites in Dong Tso may represent an early stage of a Middle Jurassic ocean basin.

==== Lankor Tso ====
Like the Dong Tso, the Lankor Tso also includes metaperidotite, isotropic and layered gabbros, pillow basalts, and chert. However, in this area, the serpentinite-matrix melange is more prominent and bears traces of volcaniclastic rocks, diorite, granodiorite, and tonalite. U/Pb SHRIMP dating of zircons from rocks associated with the ophiolitic melange give Middle Jurassic ages. Lying to the northeast of Lagkor Tso, amphibolites, metagabbros, and other assemblages of metamorphic rocks can be found. Pressure-temperature (P-T) conditions have been estimated to be 5-7 kbar and 555-655 °C for the amphibolite-facies metamorphism in the area. Due to the presence of the coeval arc-related granodiorites in the same region, the elevated P-T conditions may be due to a back-arc intra-continental rift setting with elevated heat flow.

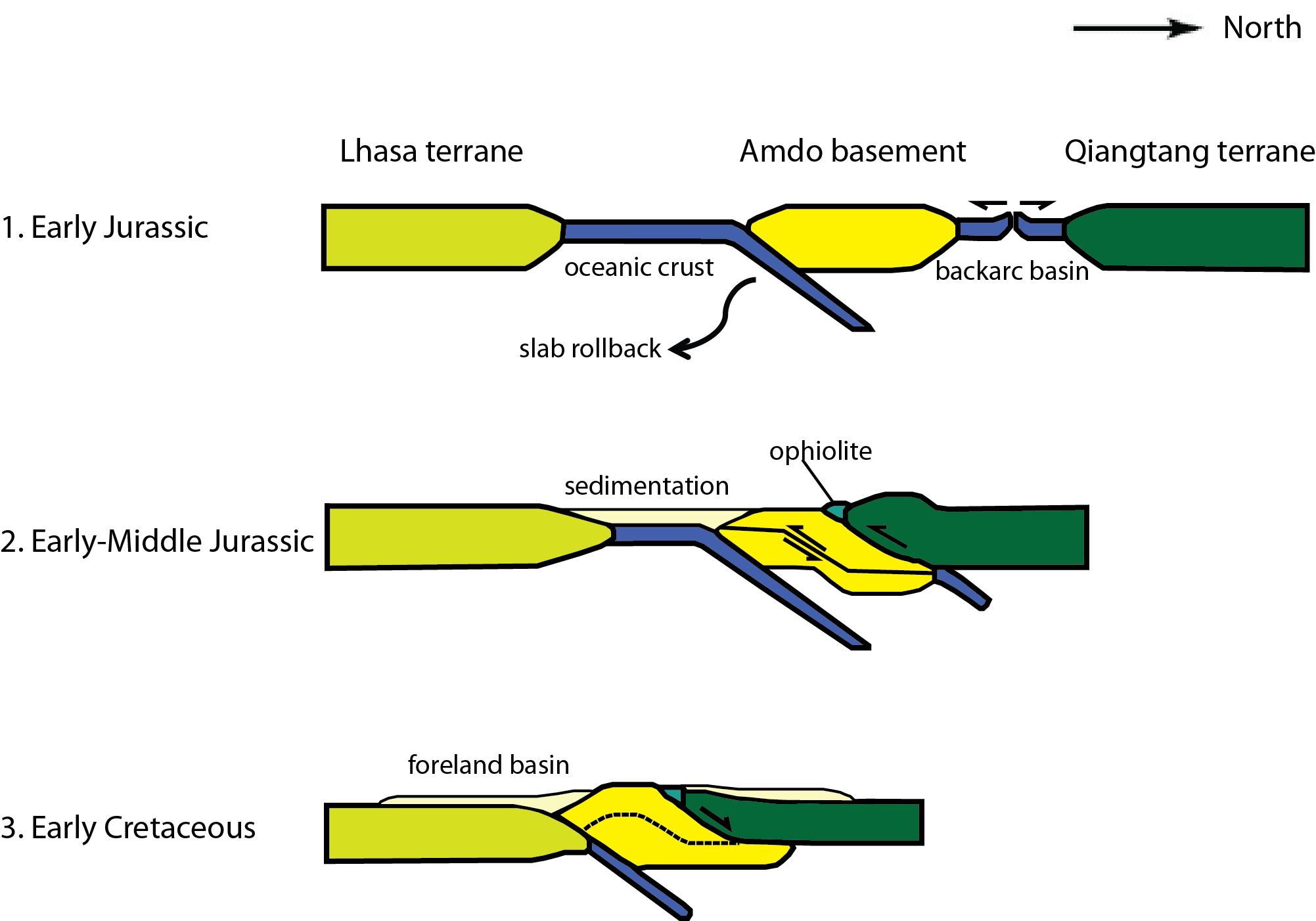
Cross section depicting the tectonic evolution of the Bangong-Nujiang suture zone. 1. Slab rollback of the oceanic crust between the Lhasa and Amdo terranes causes an Early Jurassic oceanic back-arc basin to form between the Amdo and Qiangtang terranes. 2. During the Early-Middle Jurassic, subduction of oceanic crust beneath the Amdo terrane continues. 3. The back-arc basin closes and ophiolitic obduction occurs. The Lhasa and Qiangtang terranes collide in the Early Cretaceous, forming the Bangong-Nujiang suture.

=== Amdo: Dongqiao-Amdo (middle sector) ===
The Amdo massif lies in the central sector of the BNS and covers an area of approximately 5200 km^{2}. It is predominately composed of orthogneiss, paragneiss, amphibolite, marble, quartzite, and schist. Once part of the ancient Tethys Ocean, the Amdo massif formed during the Permian-Triassic as a microcontinent as the Qiangtang and Lhasa terranes rifted apart.

The Amdo terrane includes:

- Precambrian Zharen Group

-Rock Types: Schists, marble, and mylonitic fabrics are present. Lower amphibolite-facies metamorphism.

- Paleozoic Jiayuqiao Group

-Rock Types: Limestone, felsic volcanic rocks. Greenschist-facies metamorphism.

- Early Permian Xiala Formation

-Rock Types: Shallow-water limestone.

- Quehala Group

-Rock Types: Sandy slate with coral fossils.

- Late Jurassic to Early Cretaceous Guoqu Group

-Rock Types: Conglomerate, tuffaceous sandstone, and slate. Greenschist-facies metamorphism.

Similar to the Dong Tso in the Gertse area, geochemical analysis of samples taken from the Amdo massif show arc-related features; thus, this area would have been under an active continental margin setting.

=== Basu: Dingqing-Nujiang (eastern sector) ===
The Basu massif, located east of the Amdo massif in the Dingqing-Nujiang area, is approximately 200 km long and up to 50 km wide. It is largely composed of metasedimentary rocks and granitic gneiss that is surrounded by Late Triassic-Early Jurassic ophiolitic melange. Eclogites of Triassic age have been discovered within the Basu massif, and their geochemistry shows two different types of clinopyroxenes that are interpreted to reflect extremely fast exhumation of these rocks. Like the Amdo massif, the Basu massif is believed to be metamorphosed continental basement, and it may have also been part of a former microcontinent within the Bangong Meso-Tethys.

== Predictive models for deformation ==
Two end-member models have been proposed to explain the deformation observed in central Asia. England and Houseman (1986) proposed a numerical model to predict deformation processes for a "soft Tibet," treating Tibet as a thin viscous sheet. In this model, continental lithosphere is presumed to be more ductile, and growth of the Tibetan Plateau would be caused by continuous crustal thickening due to the convergence of the Indian and Eurasian plates. Reactivation along the BNS would occur as a series of many small faults along the boundary of the suture zone. The second end-member model, proposed by Tapponnier et al. (2001), uses a micro-plate tectonic model. In this model, localized shearing between coherent lithospheric blocks is proposed to explain the high elevations observed in Tibet. Oblique subduction and large-scale sinistral strike-slip faults leading to eastward extrusion of lithospheric material would be responsible for the growth of Tibet to the east.

== See also ==
- Geology of the Himalaya, its tectonic movements impact the Bangong-Nujiang Suture Zone
- Yarlun-Zangpo Suture Zone, south of Bangong-Nujiang Suture Zone
- Transhimalaya, south of Yarlun-Zangpo Suture Zone which also contains Lhasa Terrane in its southeast
- Qiangtang terrane, northwest of Bangong-Nujiang Suture Zone
