= Mount Nyenchen Tanglha =

7,162m peak in Tibet, China

- Nyainqêntanglha Feng, Nyenchen Thanglha, Nyenchentangla, Nyanchen Thanglha, Nyainchentanglha
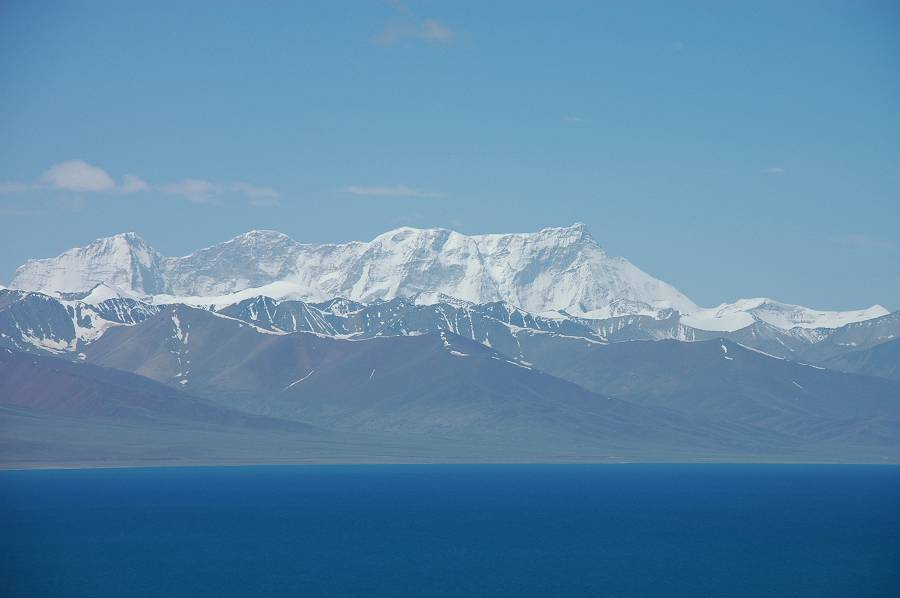

Highest point
- Elevation: 7,162 m (23,497 ft)
- Prominence: 2,239 m (7,346 ft)
- Listing: Ultra
- Coordinates: 30°22′03″N 90°35′06″E

Geography
- Location within Tibet
- Location: Damxung County, Tibet, China
- Parent range: Nyenchen Tanglha Mountains

Climbing
- First ascent: 8 May 1986 by a Japanese expedition
- Easiest route: Glacier/snow/ice climb

Mount Nyenchen Tanglha (officially Nyainqêntanglha Feng; Tibetan: གཉན་ཆེན་ཐང་ལྷ་, Wylie: Gnyan-chen-thang-lha; Chinese: 念青唐古拉峰, Pinyin: Niànqīng Tánggǔlā Fēng) is the highest peak of Nyenchen Tanglha Mountains, which together with the Gangdise range form the Transhimalaya.

== Location ==
Mount Nyenchen Tanglha is located in the western part of the range on the watershed between the Yarlung Tsangpo (Brahmaputra River) to the south and the endorheic basins of the Changtang to the north. In particular, it lies to the south of Namtso Lake. It belongs to Damxung County in the Prefecture of Lhasa of Tibet.

== Mythology ==
In Tibetan mythology Nyenchen Tanglha is considered the most influential deity in a large part of northern Tibet. In his mortal form he is shown riding a white horse, wearing a satin dress and holding a horse whip in one hand and a Buddhist rosary in the other. He is considered to be a bodhisattva on the eighth level, and is a protector of the teachings of the Nyingma tradition. Nyenchen Tanglha is the subject of many fairy tales and folklore.

== The three main summits of Nyenchen Tanglha ==
With an elevation of 7,162m, Nyenchen Tanglha is the highest mountain of the Transhimalayan range. It has a topographic prominence of 2,239m and its parent mountain is Gurla Mandhata located 890 km west. Key saddle is at 4,923m (30°25'57"N 81°37'28"E) near the spring of Yarlung Tsangpo River (Brahmaputra).

Nyenchen Tanglha has three main summits above 7,000m, located on a northwest–southeast ridge. All three main summits were climbed between 1986 and 1995.

Mountain	Height (m)	Coordinates	Prominence (m)	Parent mountain	First ascent
Nyenchen Tanglha I	7,162	30°23′26″N 90°33′49″E	2,239	Gurla Mandhata	8 May 1986
Nyenchen Tanglha II	7,117	30°22′15″N 90°35′03″E	189	Nyenchen Tanglha I	28 July 1989
Nyenchen Tanglha III	7,046	30°22′06″N 90°36′03″E	253	Nyenchen Tanglha II	22 August 1995

== See also ==
- List of ultras of Tibet, East Asia and neighbouring areas
