= Panjal Traps =

Large igneous province from the early to middle Permian

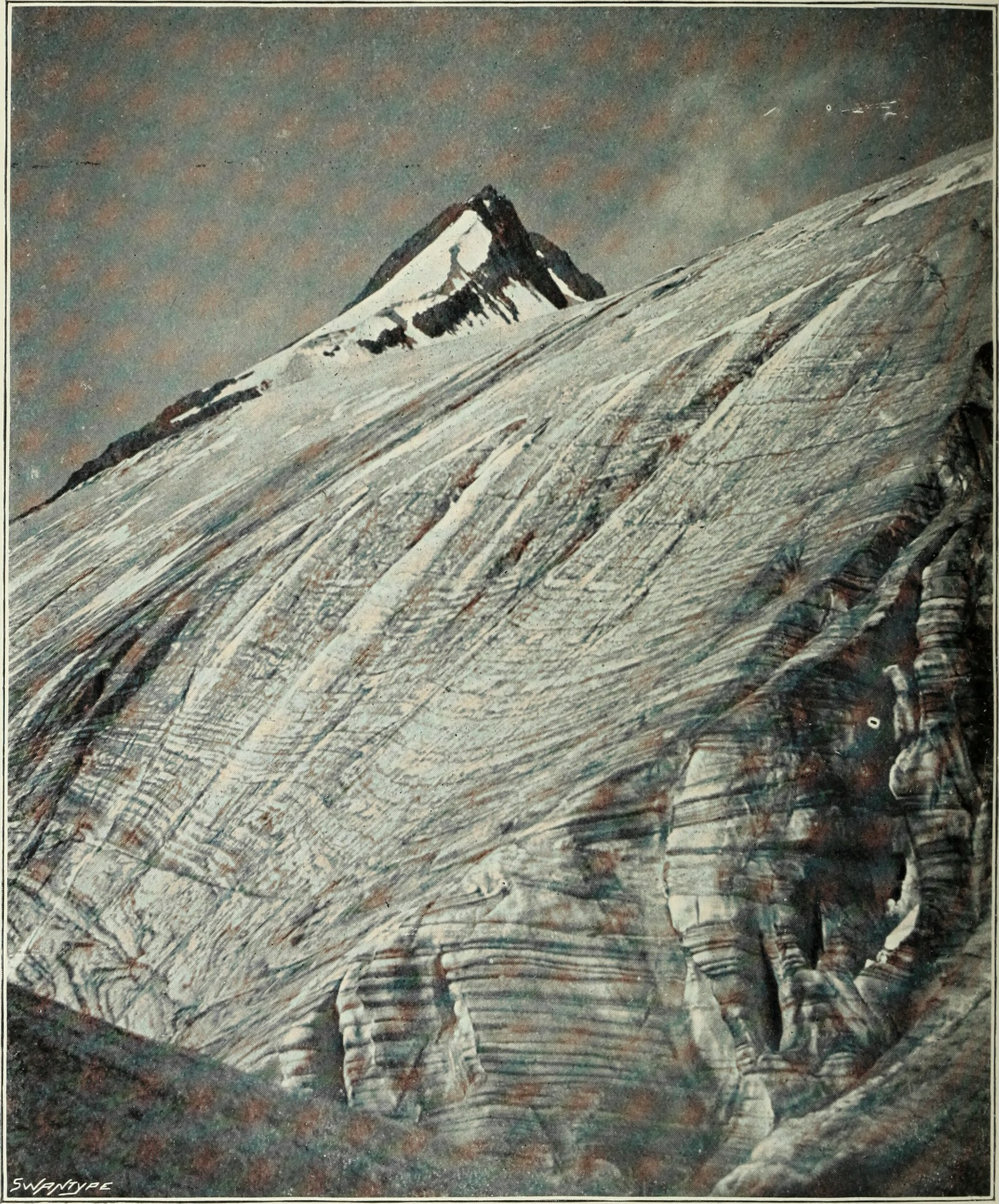
Panjal Traps in 1912

The Panjal Traps or the Tethyan Plume is a large igneous province (LIP) that erupted during the Early–Middle Permian in what is now north-western India. The Panjal Traps are associated with the opening of the Neo-Tethys Ocean, which resulted in the dispersal of the Cimmerian continental blocks from the north-eastern margin of Gondwana and possibly the break-up of this old and large continent. In the Zanskar-Spliti-Lahaul area (in the north-western Himalayas and south-east Ladakh) the 30–150 m (98–492 ft)-thick basalts of the Panjal Traps are mostly exposed as massive (terrestrial) lava flows, but also as (marine) pillow lavas and hyaloclastites.

The Panjal Traps were first documented in 1824 and were eventually named by British geologist Richard Lydekker in 1883, but their origin, age, and relationship with surrounding and underlying rocks remained elusive for more than a century. They remained one of the most understudied LIPs before being properly dated to 289 Ma in 2011.

== Geological setting ==
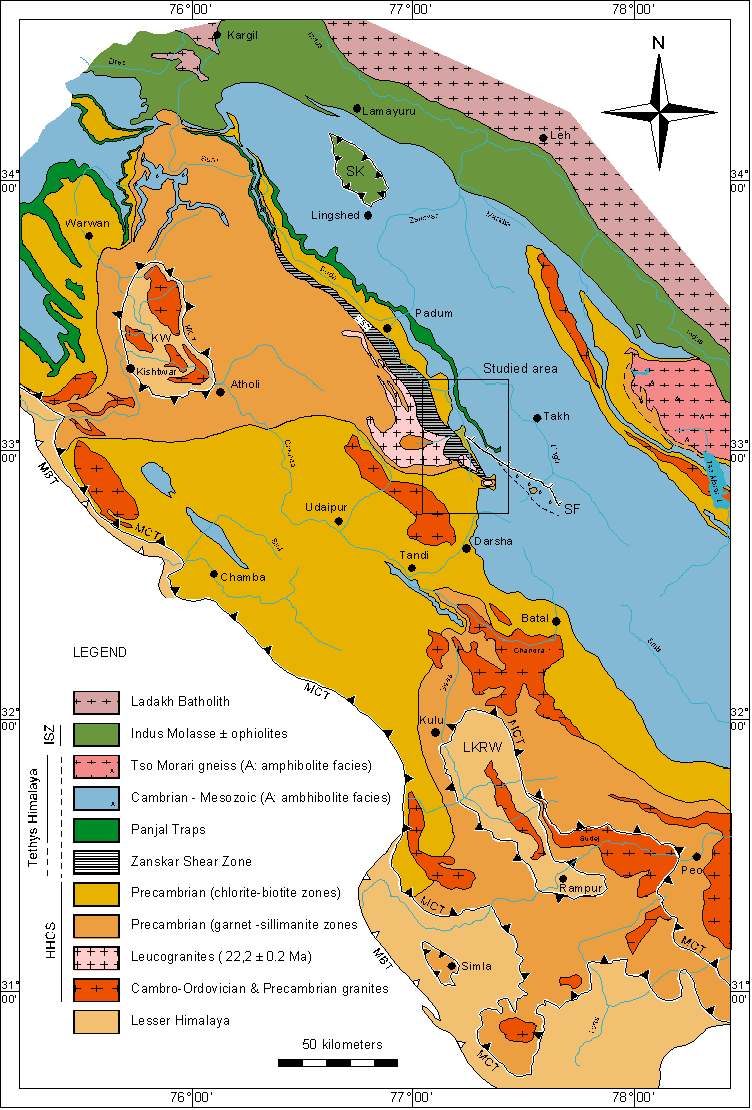
Tectonic map of northwestern Himalaya with the Panja traps shown in dark green (not to be confused with light green which represents Indus Molasse).

Late Carboniferous to Early Permian deposits of Tethyan affinity in the Zanskar-Spiti area are mostly terrigenous, detrital sedimentary rocks, although some magmatic activity documented in Pakistan and central Nepal has been associated with this period. These sedimentary layers are associated with the erosion that followed the uplift of the margins of the newly rifted Indian continent. In the eastern and central Himalayas more voluminous volcanic eruptions have been documented from the same period. The Abor volcanics produced 1,500 m (4,900 ft) of basaltic to andesitic flows and tuffs. In the Late Permian (Sakmarian-Roadian) the theoliitic Nar-Tsum(?) produced 300 metres (980 ft) of spilites and Bhote Kosi basalts in southern Tibet.

The slightly younger (Artinskian-Kazanian) Panjal Traps produced the largest magmatic province in north-western India. Its lava flows now covers 10^{5} km^{2}, from the eastern Zanskar-Spliti-Lahaul area to north-eastern Pakistan and they filled a rifted valley called the Zanskar-Spiti synclinorium. The original extent of the Panjal Traps may have exceeded 0.2 million km^{2}, a distribution similar to those of the Emeishan LIP in south-western China and the Columbia River basalts in north-western United States. In Ladakh and in the Kashmir Basin the flows are 2,500 m (8,200 ft) thick with a smaller amount of pyroclastics overlain by aphyric basaltic flows. In north-eastern Pakistan the Panjal flows are exposed as dykes cross-cutting the basement and Early Paleozoic layers, and as inter-layered magmatic flows on Late Plaeozoic to Early Mesozoic layers with Tethyan affinity.

The eruption of the Panjal Traps was followed (Kazanian-Djulfian) by the emplacement of a succession of sediments, the result of the progressive thermo-tectonic subsidence of the Indian passive margin associated with the expanding Neo-Tethys.

== Tectonic implications ==
The Panjal Traps have been associated with either the Mid-Capitanian (260 Ma) or End-Permian (251 Ma) mass extinction events. Analyses of zircon crystals have, however, yielded an ^{206}U/^{238}Pb age of 289±2 Ma — considerably older than these mass extinctions. The Panjal Traps can, nevertheless, be linked to the African large low-shear-velocity province (or superplume) and, as such, is most likely responsible for the widespread flood basalts in the Himalayas, but the Siberian Traps (251 Ma) are probably a better candidate for these younger mass extinctions.

Late Carboniferous-Permian LIPs (such as Jutland, Panjal, Tarim, Emeishan and Siberia) were emplaced before the break-up of Pangaea whereas the post-Permian LIPs were involved in the break-up of the supercontinent. Mantle plume-derived LIPs share features such as large-volume flood basalts, short duration, uplift and doming of the crust before eruption, and high temperature-melts such as komatiites and picrites. The chemical and isotopic composition of samples of basalt taken from the eastern Kashmir Valley are similar to within-plate basalts, and probably derived from a spinel peridotite source. Samples taken from the western side of the valley are more primitive, derived from a more depleted source. This suggests that Panjal made a transition from a newly formed continental setting, where the basalt composition was 'enriched OIB-like', to an old ocean basin, where the composition was 'depleted MORB-like'. Chemically, the Panjal basalts are similar to those from post-Permian/post-Pangaean LIPs.

Paleomagnetic data from the Kashmir Valley indicate the Panjal eruption occurred at a paleolatitude of c. 33° (±5°)S.
