= Qiangtang terrane =

Terrane of the Tibetan Plateau

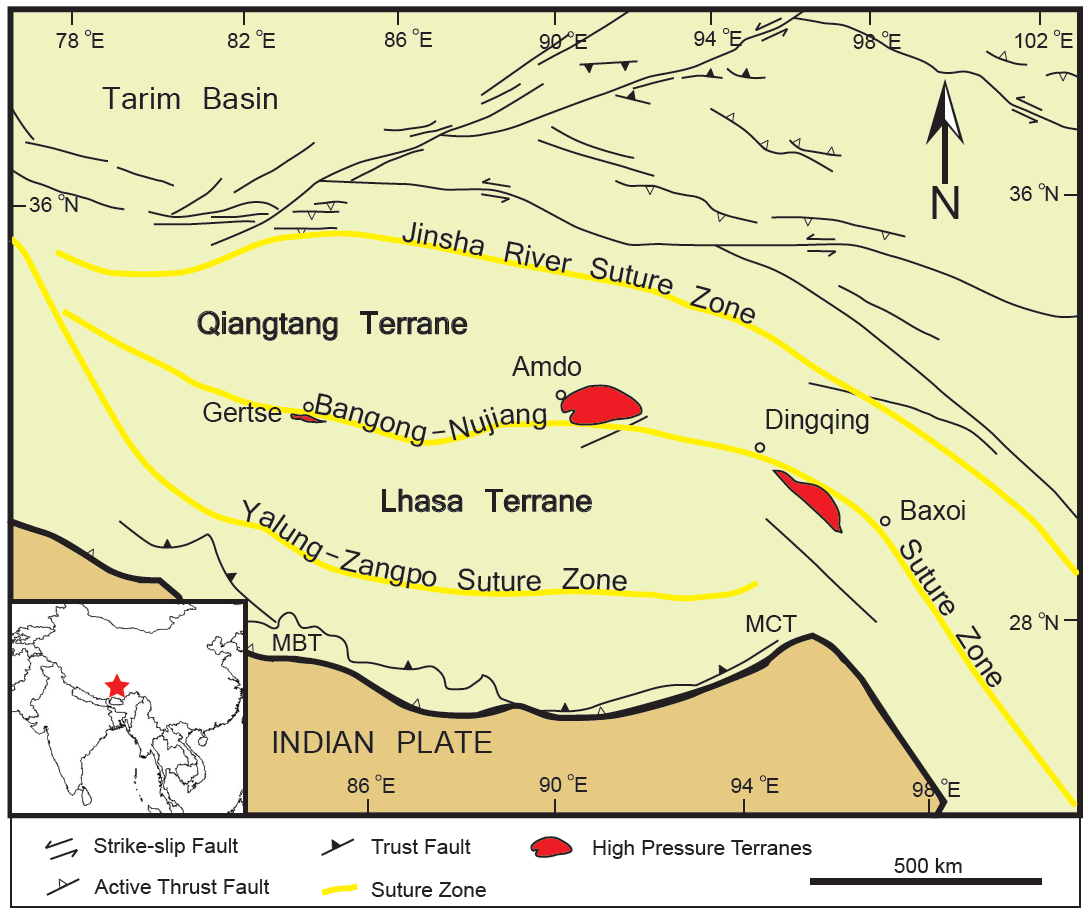
Location of Qiangtang Terrane. Bangong-Nujiang Suture Zone separates it from the Lhasa Terrane, which in turn is separated by the Indus-Yarlung suture zone from the Himalayas in the south.

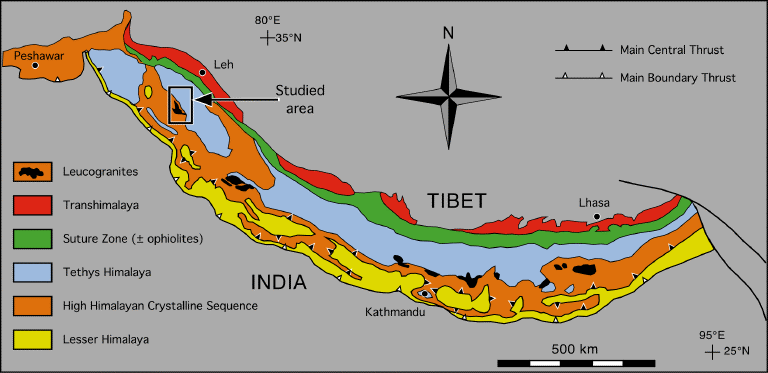
Tectonic map of the Himalaya, modified after Le Fort & Cronin (1988). Red is Transhimalaya. Green is Indus-Yarlung suture zone, north of which lies Lhasa terrane, follow by Bangong-Nujiang Suture Zone and then Qiangtang terrane.

The Qiantang terrane is one of three main west-east-trending terranes of the Tibetan Plateau.

During the Triassic, a southward-directed subduction along its northern margin resulted in the Jin-Shajing suture, the limit between it and the Songpan-Ganzi terrane. During the Late Jurassic and Early Cretaceous, the Lhasa terrane merged with its southern margin along the Bangong suture. This suture, the closure of part of the Tethys Ocean, transformed the Qiantang terrane into a large-scale anticline. The merging of the Lhasa and Qiangtang terranes resulted in the uplift of a palaeoplateau known as the Qiangtang Plateau, which rapidly thinned later in the Cretaceous.

The Qiantang terrane is now located at c. 5,000 m (16,000 ft) above sea level, but the timing of this uplift remains debated, with estimates ranging from the Pliocene-Pleistocene (3–5 Mya) to the Eocene (35 Mya) when the plateau was first denudated.

== See also ==
- Geology of the Himalaya
- Indus Suture Zone
- Transhimalaya
- Lhasa terrane
- Karakoram fault system
- High pressure metamorphic terranes along the Bangong-Nujiang Suture Zone
