= Transhimalaya =

Mountain range in China, India and Nepal

Transhimalaya; (Gangdise – Nyenchen Tanglha range)
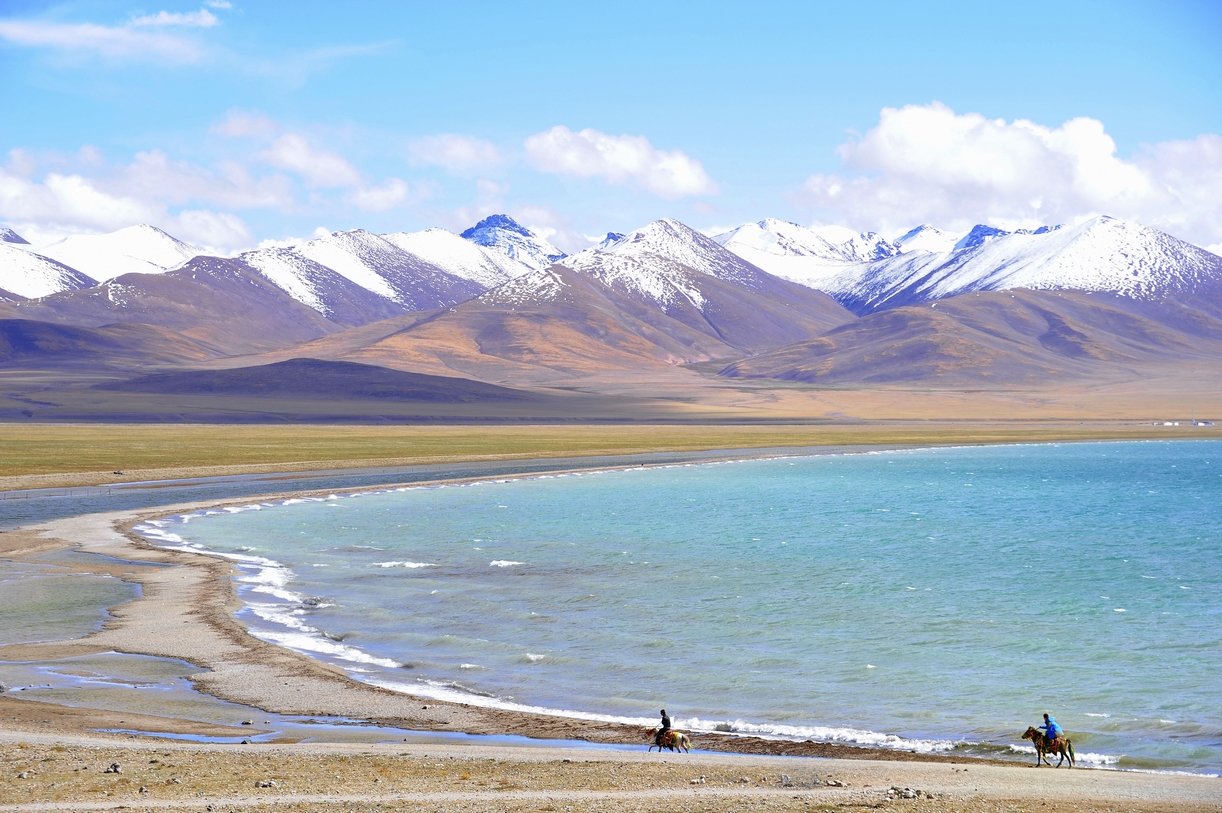
- Part of the Nyenchen Tanglha range in the Transhimalaya

Highest point
- Peak: Mount Nyenchen Tanglha
- Elevation: 7,162 m (23,497 ft)

Dimensions
- Length: 1,600 km (990 mi)

Geography
- State: Tibet
- Range coordinates: 30°23′00″N 90°34′31″E
- Parent range: Alpine orogeny, Tibetan Plateau (perimeter range)

The Transhimalaya (also spelled Trans-Himalaya), or Gangdise – Nyenchen Tanglha range (Chinese: 冈底斯-念青唐古拉山脉; pinyin: Gāngdǐsī-Niànqīngtánggǔlā Shānmài), is a 1,600-kilometre-long (990 mi) mountain range in China, India and Nepal, extending in an east-west direction parallel to the main Himalayan range. Located north of Yarlung Tsangpo river on the southern edge of the Tibetan Plateau, the Transhimalaya is composed of the Gangdise range to the west and the Nyenchen Tanglha range to the east.

The name Transhimalaya was introduced by the Swedish geographer Sven Hedin in the early 20th century. The Transhimalaya was described by the Columbia Lippincott Gazetteer in 1952 as an "ill-defined mountain area" with "no marked crest line or central alignment and no division by rivers." On more-modern maps the Kailas Range (Gangdise or Kang-to-sé Shan) in the west is shown as distinct from the Nyenchen Tanglha range in the east.

== Geology ==
The Transhimalayas are geologically distinct from the other Himalayan ranges. They were probably formed by subduction of sediments from the collision of the Indian and Eurasian plates. A consensus of different dating methods suggests that the older parts of this range formed in the upper Cretaceous (82-113 Mya), while the younger regions formed in the Eocene (40-60 Mya).

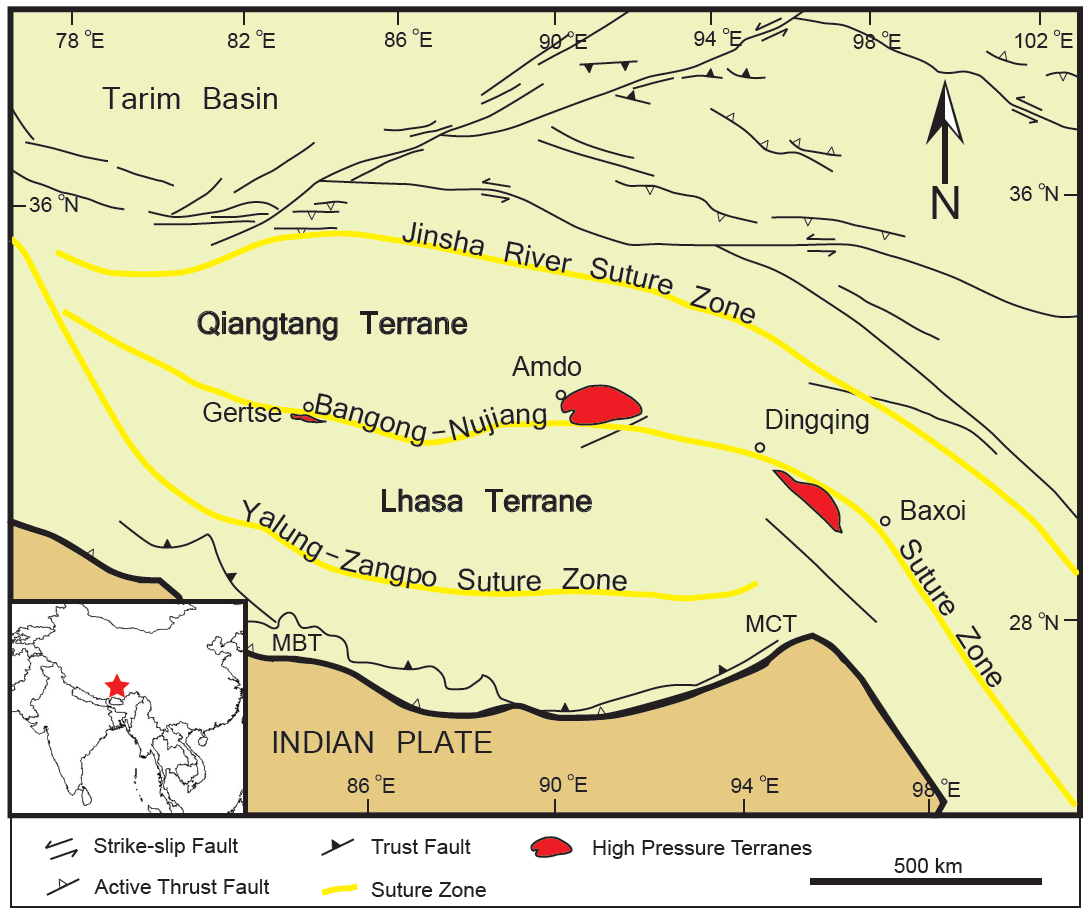
Location of Transhimalaya which includes Lhasa terrane. In the north, Bangong-Nujiang Suture Zone separates Transhimalaya from the Qiangtang terrane. In the south, Indus-Yarlung suture zone separates it from Himalayas.

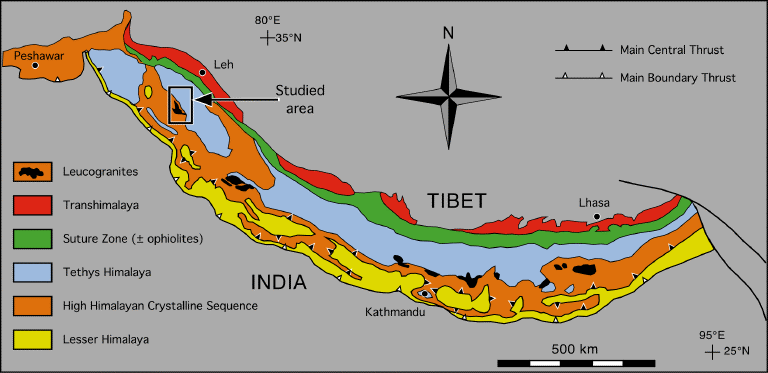
Tectonic map of the Himalaya, modified after Le Fort & Cronin (1988). Red is Transhimalaya. Green is Indus-Yarlung suture zone, north of which lies Lhasa terrane, follow by Bangong-Nujiang Suture Zone and then Qiangtang terrane.

== Climate ==
The Transhimalayas generally have a cold, arid montane climate. For example, the Spiti region of Himachal Pradesh, India, has an annual rainfall of about 170 millimetres or 6.7 inches. However, studies in Mustang District, Nepal, indicate that climate change is warming the Transhimalayas at a rate of about 0.13 °C or 0.23 °F per year.

== Biodiversity ==
The Transhimalayas generally have low species diversity (and vegetation cover) and are classified as dry alpine steppes. However, a study in the Spiti region found 23 medicinal plants. Previous surveys in this region had found a total of over 800 species of vascular plants.

The Transhimalayas are home to the once endangered snow leopard, the Eurasian lynx, Tibetan wolf, red fox and Tibetan fox. Native herbivores include the argali, Tibetan gazelle, urial, wild ass or kiang, Asiatic ibex, yak and bharal.

=== Conflict and conservation ===
The Tibetan wolf, snow leopard and lynx are major predators of livestock in the Ladakh region of India. Goats, sheep, yak and horses were their most common prey. In Mustang, Nepal, rising temperatures and declining snowfall are reducing the area available for agriculture, forcing villagers to relocate and reducing grassland and forest cover. This has also led to bharal shifting to lower elevations, where they raid crops. In turn, this attracts snow leopards to human settlements, where they prey on livestock.

On the other hand, many wild herbivores are out-competed and displaced by livestock. A historical analysis suggests that the Transhimalayas have lost four wild herbivores over the last millennium or so of human habitation. Many parts of the Transhimalayas are now conserved. These include the Kangrinboqê National Forest Park in China, the Pin Valley National Park (675 km^{2}) and Kibber Wildlife Sanctuary (1400 km^{2}) in India and parts of the Annapurna Conservation Area (7,629 km^{2}) in Nepal. In addition to protecting species diversity, restoration of the native Transhimalayan grasslands has also been found to trap more carbon in the soil, mitigating climate change.

== See also ==
- Geology of the Himalaya
- Indus Suture Zone
- Transhimalaya, includes the following two
  - Lhasa terrane
  - Karakoram fault system
- Bangong-Nujiang Suture Zone
- Qiangtang terrane
