= Lhasa terrane =

Fragment of crustal material that forms present-day southern Tibet

- Terrane
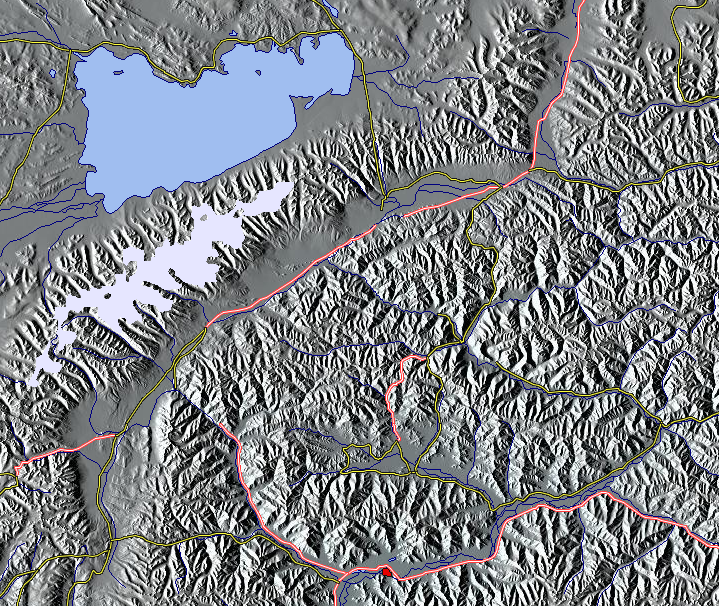
- Portion of the terrane, Namtso lake to the north above Nyenchen Tanglha Mountains (white)
- Coordinates: 30°N 91°E
- Location: Tibet Autonomous Region, China

The Lhasa terrane is a terrane, or fragment of crustal material, sutured to the Eurasian plate during the Cretaceous that forms present-day southern Tibet. It takes its name from the city of Lhasa in the Tibet Autonomous Region, China. The northern part may have originated in the East African Orogeny, while the southern part appears to have once been part of Australia. The two parts joined, were later attached to Asia, and then were impacted by the collision of the Indian plate that formed the Himalayas.

== Location ==
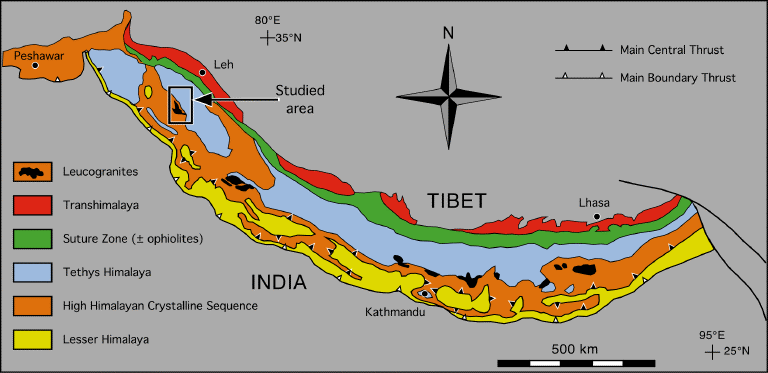
Tectonic units of the Himalaya. Green is the Indus-Yarlung suture zone. Red is the Transhimalaya. Lhasa terrane and Lhasa city in the eastern part of Transhimalaya (Red).

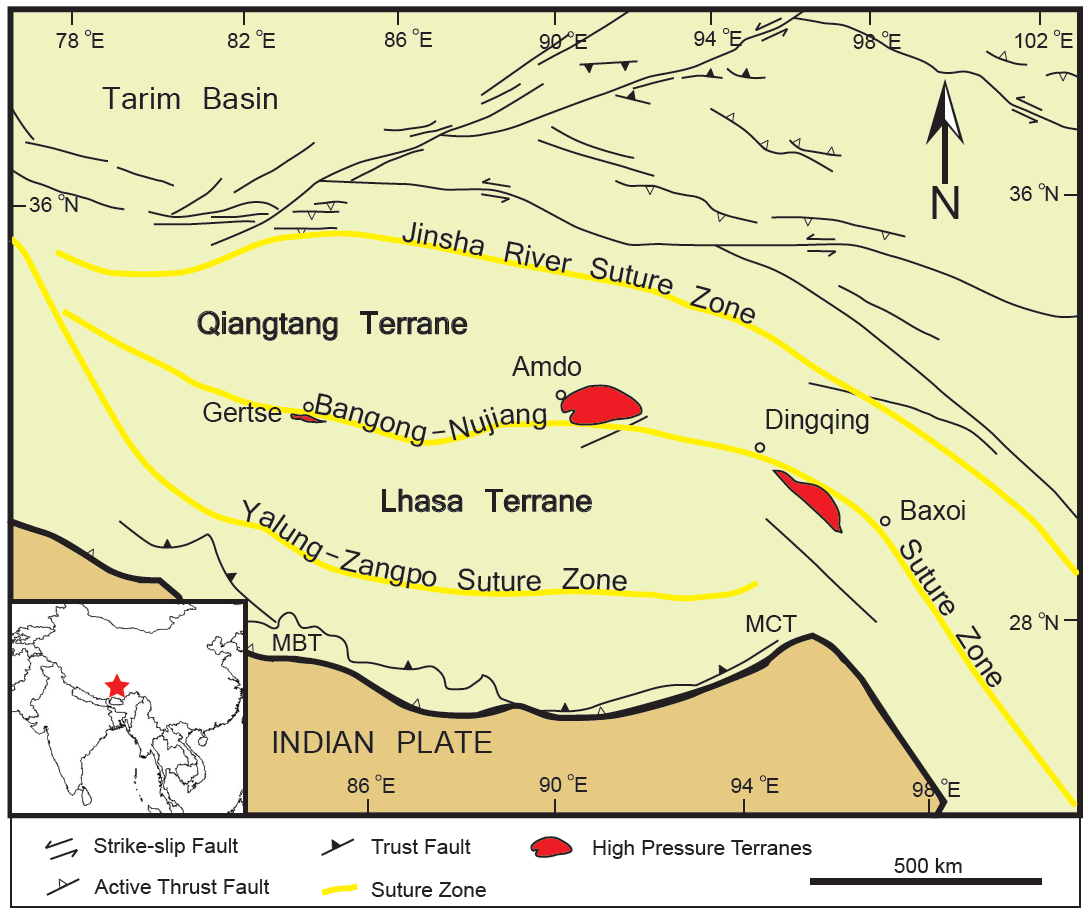
Transhimalaya and Lhasa terrane, Qiangtang terrane, Bangong-Nujiang Suture Zone. South of Indus-Yarlung suture zone is Himalayas.

The Lhasa terrane is separated from the Himalayas to the south by the Yarlung-Tsangpo suture, and from the Qiangtang terrane to the north by the Bangong-Nujiang suture. The Lhasa terrane has a Precambrian crystalline basement overlaid with sedimentary strata from the Paleozoic (c. 541–252 Ma (Note: Ma – Millions of years ago)) and Mesozoic (c. 252–66 Ma) and containing magmatic rocks from the Paleozoic to Cenozoic (66 Ma to the present). It is thought to be the last crustal block to accrete to the Eurasian plate before it collided with the Indian plate in the Cenozoic.

== Origins ==
The Lhasa terrane consisted of two blocks before the Mesozoic, the North Lhasa Block and the South Lhasa Block. The two blocks have lithology and detrital zircon ages similar to the Qiangtang terrane and to Tethyan strata in the Himalaya, which suggests these areas were nearby in Gondwana. The detrital zircon ages differ somewhat between the North and South Lhasa terranes. The South Lhasa terrane appears to have evolved as part of Australia in the late Precambrian and early Paleozoic. Isotopic analysis of detrital zircons of c. 1170 Ma from Paleozoic metasedimentary rocks in the Lhasa terrane shows identical values to detrital zircons of the same age from Western Australia. The detrital zircons probably came from southwest Australia's Albany-Fraser belt.

The North Lhasa terrane may have been formed in part from the northern part of the East African Orogeny. Neoproterozoic oceanic crustal rocks are included in the crystalline basement of the North Lhasa terrane, which are probably from the Mozambique Ocean that formed when the Rodinia super-continent broke up. In the Late Cryogenian, around 650 Ma, the oceanic crustal basement of North Lhasa experienced HP metamorphism in the subduction zone associated with the closing of the Mozambique ocean. In the Early Paleozoic around 485 Ma it experienced MP metamorphism associated with the amalgamation of Eastern and Western Gondwana.

In the Early Paleozoic the North and South Lhasa terranes and the Qiangtang terrane experienced magmatism that seems to have been the result of an Andean-type orogeny caused when the Proto-Tethys Ocean was subducted after Gondwana was finally amalgamated. In the Middle Paleozoic around 360 Ma the Lhasa and Qiangtang terranes again experienced magmatism, apparently due to the subduction of the Paleo-Tethys Ocean.

== Formation and evolution ==
Lhasa terrane approach to Qiangtang terrane

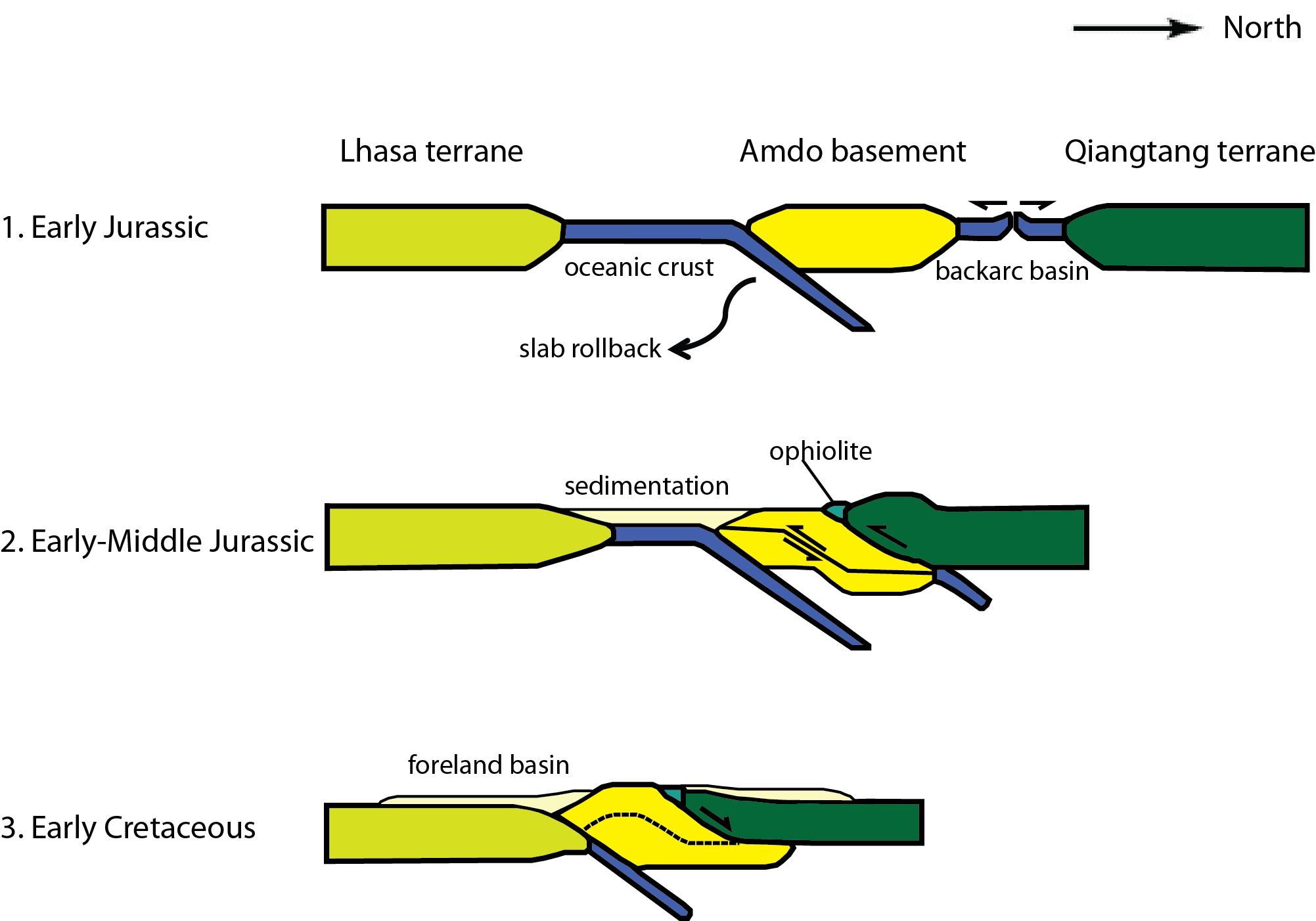
More detailed view of the tectonic evolution of the Bangong suture zone

Video paleogeographic reconstructions from Advokaat and van Hinsbergen 2024, demonstrating their proposed hypothesis rifting of the Lhasa terrane off of India during the Late Triassic-earliest Jurassic and its subsequent movement northward and collision with Asia during the Early Cretaceous and subsequent collision with the Indian subcontinent during the Cenozoic

The Lhasa terrane was formed from the North and South Lhasa terranes, which were at first separated by the Paleo-Tethys Ocean, and were joined in a suture zone in the Late Paleozoic. The Paleo-Tethys Ocean that separated the North and South Lhasa terranes closed, and around 260 Ma in the Late Permian an HP metamorphic belt formed between the two blocks. Around 220 Ma in the Triassic an MP metamorphic belt formed.

The Tibetan Plateau was formed from a number of continental terranes that rifted from northern Gondwana in the Paleozoic and Mesozoic, moved northward and accreted to southern Asia. The Lhasa terrane is the farthest south of these terranes. The Lhasa terrane moved northward and collided with the Qiangtang terrane along the Banggongco-Nujiang Suture. The collision began towards the end of the late Jurassic (c. 163–145 Ma), and collision activity continued until the early Late Cretaceous (c. 100–66) Ma . During this period the terrane may have been shortened by at least 180 kilometres (110 mi). Strata from the Lower Jurassic in the Bangong suture between the Lhasa and Qiangtang terranes differ from the rocks in the Lhasa terrane and appear to have a unique source.

The collision with the Qiangtang terrane caused a peripheral foreland basin to form in the north part of the Lhasa terrane, which persisted into the Early Cretaceous. In some parts of the foreland basin the north-dipping subduction of the Neotethyan oceanic crust below the Lhasa terrane caused volcanism. The Gangdese volcanic arc was formed as this subduction continued along the southern margin of the Lhasa terrane. The Gangdese batholith intrudes the southern half of the Lhasa terrain. There is evidence that by the end of the Cretaceous the Southern Tibet crust was approximately twice as thick as normal.

Clastic sediments found in the terrane were deposited in shallow waters during the Early Cretaceous (c. 146–100 Ma.) In northern Lhasa these sediments formed in the foreland basin created during the Lhasa–Qiangtang collision. They are overlaid by marine limestone from the Aptian-Albian period, deposited in a shallow continental seaway. The Takena formation developed in the Late Cretaceous in the foreland basin to the north of the Gangdese magmatic arc, and consists of marine limestone overlaid by fluvial red beds. Outcropped folds in the Takena formation between Lhasa and Yangbajain are upright or lean slightly to the north or south, and indicate 30% to 50% shortening in the Late Cretaceous before the Indian collision.

== India–Asia collision ==
Contact with Indian plate began along the Yarlung–Zangbo suture around 50 Ma during the Eocene, and the two continents continue to converge.

Magmatism continued in the Gangdese arc until as late as 40 Ma. There are competing hypotheses about the details of the tectonic processes during the collision between the Indian and Eurasian plates. At one extreme, some consider that during the collision the Indian crust was underthrust beneath the southern Asian crust, or injected into this crust. At the other extreme, some consider that the convergence was mostly accommodated by shortening of the Asian crust.

The results of seismic reflection profiling, reported in 1998, indicate that there may be a midcrustal partial-melt zone under the length of the Yangbajain-Damxung graben starting at a depth of 12 to 18 kilometres (7.5 to 11.2 mi). The reflection undulates, so the melt zone may have been tectonically deformed. North-dipping reflections deep in the crust below the Gangdese batholith at a depth of 40 to 60 kilometres (25 to 37 mi) may mark the downdip of the Yarlung-Zangbo suture, or may mark a more recent reverse fault. Taken together, the results indicate that the upper crust of the Lhasa terrane was moderately shortened by the collision, with melting in the middle crust. They neither support nor rule out underthrusting or fluid injection of the Indian continental crust below the Lhasa terrane.

The Linzizong formation is distributed widely along the Gangdese Belt. It was emplaced between 69 and 43 Ma near Lhasa and between 54 and 37 Ma in southwestern Tibet. It is slightly folded and slopes gently to the north. The formation is unconformably underlain by Cretaceous sedimentary sequences more than 3,000 metres (9,800 ft) thick, which are strongly folded. The results of palaeomagnetic studies of the Linzizong formation in the Linzhou Basin and the Takena formation reported in 2009 indicate that there was little movement of the Lhasa terrane in the Cretaceous and Early Eocene. The measurements give a northward movement of the Lhasa terrane since then of 1,847 ± 763 kilometres (1,148 ± 474 mi). This implies that there was significant crustal shortening as the collision progressed. The South Lhasa terrane experienced metamorphism and magmatism in the Early Cenozoic (55–45 Ma) and metamorphism in the Late Eocene (40–30 Ma), presumably due to the collision between the continents of India and Eurasia.

== Strata ==
Sedimentary strata from the Palaeozoic are mainly Carboniferous sandstone, metasandstone, shale and phyllite, and lesser Ordovician, Silurian and Permian limestone. Precambrian strata are rarely exposed. Rocks from the Triassic include inter-bedded limestone and basaltic volcanic units, most common along the terrane's southern margin. In the northern terrane the Jurassic strata are deepwater sandstone and shale, often with ophiolitic assemblages. In the southern terrane the Jurassic strata are marine limestone and mudstone. Strata from the Lower Cretaceous are clastic mudstone, sandstone and local conglomerate units. The Lower Cretaceous clastic units are overlaid by a shallow marine limestone from the Aptian-Albian period, exposed in many places, which in some places holds Cenomanian fossils. The strata from the Upper Cretaceous are successions of arkosic fluvial sandstone and mudstone.

== See also ==
Lhasa Terrane related (from south to north)

- Geology of the Himalaya
- Indus Suture Zone
- Transhimalaya, includes Lhasa terrane and Karakoram fault system
- High pressure metamorphic terranes along the Bangong-Nujiang Suture Zone
- Qiangtang terrane

== Sources ==
- Alsdorf, Douglas; Brown, Larry; Nelson, K. Douglas; Makovsky, Yizhaq; Klemperer, Simon; Zhao, Wenjin (August 1998). "Crustal deformation of the Lhasa terrane, Tibet plateau from Project INDEPTH deep seismic reflection profiles". Tectonics. 17 (4): 501–519. Bibcode:1998Tecto..17..501A. doi:10.1029/98tc01315. S2CID 128481049.
- Di, Cheng Zhu; Zhi, Dan Zhao; Niu, Yaoling; Dilek, Yildirim; Mo, Xuan-Xue (2011-03-13). "Lhasa terrane in southern Tibet came from Australia". Geology. 39 (8). Geological Society of America: 727–730. Bibcode:2011Geo....39..727Z. doi:10.1130/g31895.1.
- Leier, Andrew (2005). The Cretaceous Evolution of the Lhasa Terrane, Southern Tibet (PhD thesis). The University of Arizona. hdl:10150/193796.
- Leier, Andrew L.; Kapp, Paul; Gehrels, George E.; DeCelles, Peter G. (2007). "Detrital zircon geochronology of Carboniferous–Cretaceous strata in the Lhasa terrane, Southern Tibet" (PDF). Basin Research. 19 (3): 361–378. Bibcode:2007BasR...19..361L. doi:10.1111/j.1365-2117.2007.00330.x. S2CID 140611605. Archived from the original (PDF) on 2013-01-07.
- Liebke, Ursina; Appel, Erwin; Ding, Lin; Neumann, Udo; Antolin, Borja; Xu, Qiang (2010). "Position of the Lhasa terrane prior to India–Asia collision derived from palaeomagnetic inclinations of 53 Ma old dykes of the Linzhou Basin: constraints on the age of collision and post-collisional shortening within the Tibetan Plateau". Geophysical Journal International. 182 (3): 1199–1215. Bibcode:2010GeoJI.182.1199L. doi:10.1111/j.1365-246x.2010.04698.x.
- Metcalfe, I (1994). "Late Paleozoic and Mesozoic paleogeography of eastern Pangea and Thethys". In Embry, Ashton F.; Beauchamp, Benoit; Glass, Donald J. (eds.). Pangea: Global Environments and Resources. Calgary, Alberta, Canada: Canadian Society of Petroleum Geologists. ISBN 978-0-920230-57-2.
- Ozacar, Arda (2015). "Paleotectonic Evolution of Tibet". Archived from the original on 2015-02-18.
- Wan, Tianfeng (2010). The Tectonics of China: Data, Maps and Evolution. Berlin: Springer. ISBN 978-3-642-11866-1.
- Zhang, Z.M.; Dong, X.; Santosh, M.; Zhao, G.C (January 2014). "Metamorphism and tectonic evolution of the Lhasa terrane, Central Tibet". Gondwana Research. 25 (1): 170–189. Bibcode:2014GondR..25..170Z. doi:10.1016/j.gr.2012.08.024.
