= Karakoram fault system =

Fault system in the Himalayan region

Topographical map of India and Himalaya region with Karakoram fault superimposed on top of it. Karakoram overlay modified from

The Karakoram fault is an oblique-slip fault system in the Himalaya region. The slip along the fault accommodates radial expansion of the Himalayan arc, northward indentation of the Pamir Mountains, and eastward lateral extrusion of the Tibetan Plateau. Current plate motions suggest that the convergence between the Indian plate and the Eurasian plate is around 44±5 mm per year in the western Himalaya-Pamir region and approximately 50±2 mm per year in the eastern Himalayan region.

== Origin ==
The creation of the Karakoram fault started with the closing of the ancient Tethys Ocean seaway which once separated the two modern continents of Asia and India. The Karakoram fault itself does not trace a plate boundary, except for where it possibly ends in the Indus-Yarlung Suture Zone. The original thrusting occurred by linking existing thrust faults in what is now the Pamir Mountains starting between 17 and 20 million years ago.

=== Evolution ===
The Karakoram fault was a right lateral slip fault starting approximately 20 million years ago. Approximately 14 million years ago the fault changed to a predominately normal fault. This conclusion is based on argon dating. Around 10-11 million years ago the Karakoram fault had become trans-tensional and extended southwest into Tibet. The southwest extension is marked by the Karakoram fault crossing the active South Kailas Thrust in the vicinity of present-day Mount Kailas.

== Length ==
Karakoram fault information modified from and superimposed on top of topographic map of region. EPM= East Pamir Mountains

It is suggested that a late Cretaceous-Eocene granite batholith had been offset 1000 km dextrally along the Karakoram Fault based on mapping in the central Karakoram, in nearby Ladakh-Zanskar, and in south Tibet. Some researchers suggest that this might be incorrect due to associating granite that was never part of the same batholith. Others researchers work have shown 600 km of right lateral slip since 23 million years ago, and possibly starting 34 million years ago, based on U-Pb dating. Slip in this model has been transferred into the Indus-Yalu suture zone, as well as large scale boudinage. Research in the early 1990s suggested that this slip was transferred into the South Tibetan Detachment. Another suggestion is that the Karakoram fault is offset at least 500 km as measured by the offset of late Paleozoic granites in the Kunlun batholith. Most researchers tend to agree with the lower slip estimates. A major obstacle in measuring the total offset along the fault is in deciding what is actually a part of the fault and which faults are separate. Currently some researchers believe that the Karakoram fault merges and terminates into the Indus-Yalu suture zone at Mount Kailas. Other researchers also add the Gurla Mandhata detachment, in the South-Eastern segment, to the fault.

=== North-Western segment ===
The north-western segment of the Karakoram Fault is far less disputed than other areas. It terminates in the extensions of the Miuji Basin, in the Pamir Mountains, along the border between Tajikistan and Xinjiang provinces. In this north-western segment, the Karakoram Fault currently has predominantly normal fault motion, and right-lateral strike-slip offset. The slip in this section of the Karakoram fault is measured to be approximately 150 km, as measured by the offset of the Aghil formation. The Aghil formation is a fossiliferous carbonate formation. Before entering the Pamir region the Karakoram fault is believed to split into two distinct faults. These faults are the main Karakoram fault itself, and the Achiehkopai fault.

=== South-Eastern segment ===
Most people agree that the South-Eastern portion of the fault merges into and parallels the Indus Suture Zone in South West Tibet. The southern segment of the Karakoram Fault shows that only 120 km of dextral motion is evident from offset of geologic features, such as the Indus River and the South Kailas Thrust, and that the strain in this region is almost entirely accommodated for by a north–south shortening in the Himalaya, just south of the Indus Suture Zone. The Neogene Gar Basin in western Tibet also accommodates slip along the Karakoram fault. The basin lies within the northern approximately 1 km wide area of the fault, and contains listric normal faults. The Gurla Mandhata fault system is thought to be encompassed within the Karakoram fault system at its southern tip, which cause the southern tip of the fault to be approximately 36 km wide. Exhumation along the Gurla Mandhata detachment, which is a low-angle normal-fault system, suggest that the faults have allowed for between 36 and 66 kilometers of slip.

== See also ==
- Geology of the Himalaya
- Geology of Nepal
- Indus River – the erosion at Nanga Parbat is causing rapid uplifting of lower crustal rocks
- Sutlej River – similar small scale erosion to the Indus
- Tibetan Plateau to the North (also discussed in Geography of Tibet)
- Paleotethys
