= Bangong suture =

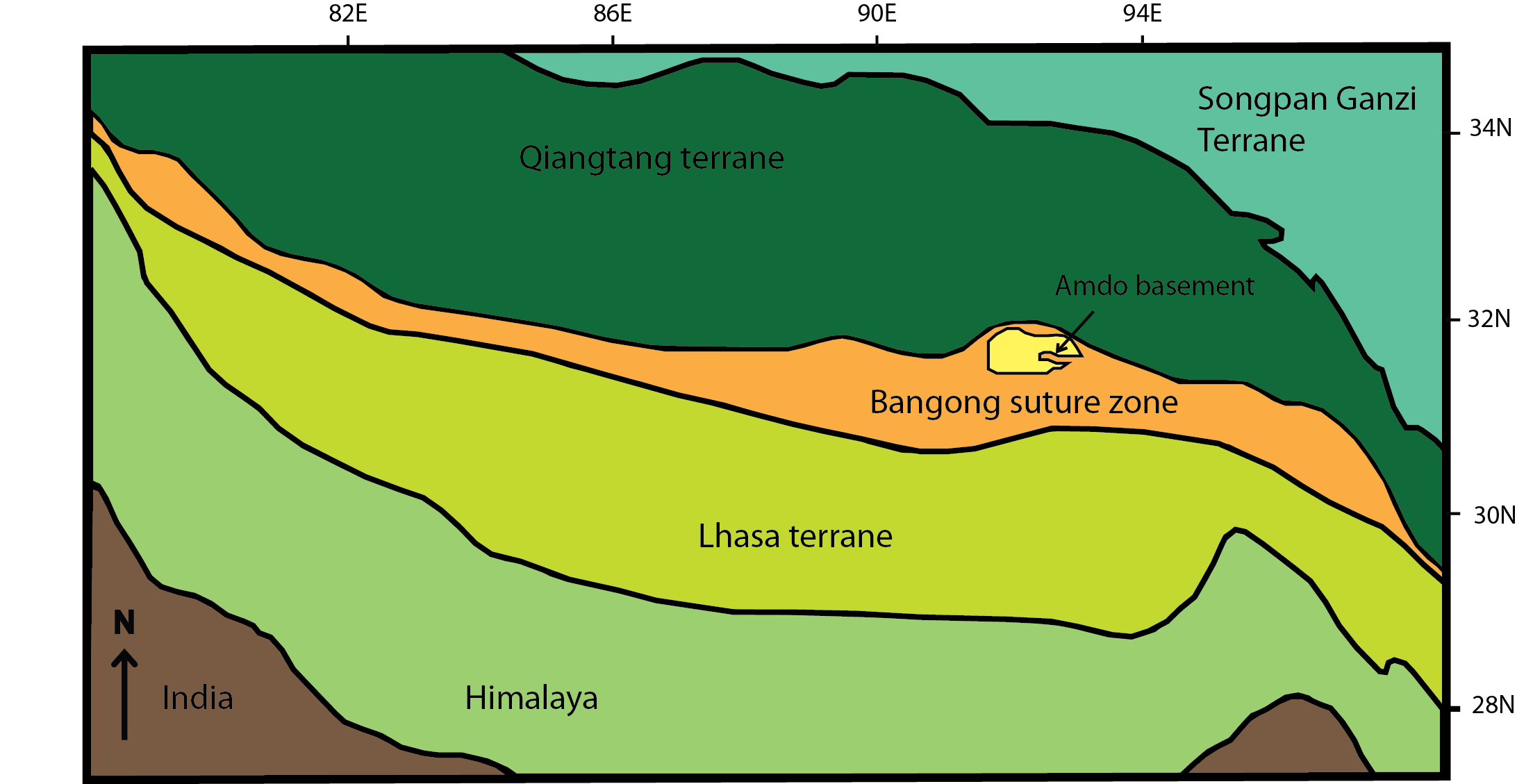
General map of central and southern Tibet depicting the Bangong suture (located between the BSZ and Qiangtang terrane) and Bangong suture zone (BSZ) and surrounding terranes. Map is modified from Guynn et al., 2011.

The Bangong suture zone is a key location in the central Tibet conjugate fault zone. Approximately 1,200 km long, the suture trends in an east–west orientation. Located in central Tibet between the Lhasa (southern block) and Qiangtang (northern block) terranes, it is a discontinuous belt of ophiolites and mélange that is 10–20 km wide, up to 50 km wide in places. The northern part of the fault zone consists of northeast striking sinistral strike-slip faults while the southern part consists of northwest striking right lateral strike-slip faults. These conjugate faults to the north and south of the Bangong intersect with each other along the Bangong-Nujiang suture zone.

== Description ==
The Bangong-Nujiang Suture is a ~1200 km long east-west trending zone that separates the Lhasa and Qiangtang terranes. It can be divided into three parts: Bangong Lake-Gertse (western sector), Dongqiao-Amdo (middle sector), and Dingqing-Nujiang (eastern sector). During the Middle to Late Jurassic, northward subduction of the Meso-Tethys Ocean between the Lhasa and Qiangtang terranes ceased, and during the Early Cretaceous, the Lhasa terrane began underthrusting beneath the Qiangtang terrane. Traces of the Meso-Tethys Ocean are left as fragments of obducted ophiolites within serpentinite-matrix mélange scattered along the BNS.

== Collision and suture development ==
The geology of the suture includes Jurassic marine shale and conglomeratic strata, melange and ophiolites and volcanic rocks from multiple pulses of magmatism. Each of these lithologies can be tied to specific terranes, either island arcs or microcontinents, that were gathered in front of the Indian subcontinent as it drifted northward during the Mesozoic. During the Jurassic-Cretaceous collision of the Lhasa and Qiangtang terranes, the ancient Tethys ocean closed, creating the Bangong suture zone. Oceanic lithosphere (the Meso-Tethys) was consumed during this collision and subducted under the Qiangtang terrane. This led to obduction of ophiolites on the northern margin of the Lhasa terrane This period of obduction is generally accepted to mark the end of oceanic subduction beneath southern Qiangtang and the onset of Lhasa-Qiangtang collision. An important feature of the Bangong suture is the Amdo basement. This exposure of pre-Mesozoic crystalline basement is ~100 km long and ~50 km wide. Geology of the Amdo records Mesozoic metamorphism, magmatism, and exhumation and is composed of orthogneisses and metasediments which are intruded by undeformed granitoids.

== Cenozoic reactivation ==
Suturing of microcontinents was followed by the continued northward drift of the Indian subcontinent, colliding with Eurasia during the Cenozoic, about 45-55 million years ago. Since the India-Eurasia collision, the convergence rate with Eurasia is predicted to have slowed by more than 40% between 20 and 10 Ma due to crustal thickening. The high Tibetan plateau resisted further crustal thickening leading to the slowing of convergence and subsequent migration of crustal shortening to the flanks of the plateau. The closure of the Neo-Tethys Ocean occurred at this time, as the southern edge of Eurasia (marked by the Lhasa terrane), collided with India. The penetration of the India into Eurasia reactivated the suture zone (which is located in the middle of the Tibetan Plateau), causing northward movement of both thrust faults and strike-slip faults. Strike-slip faults were responsible for moving mostly undeformed continental blocks eastward, away from the main convergent zone.

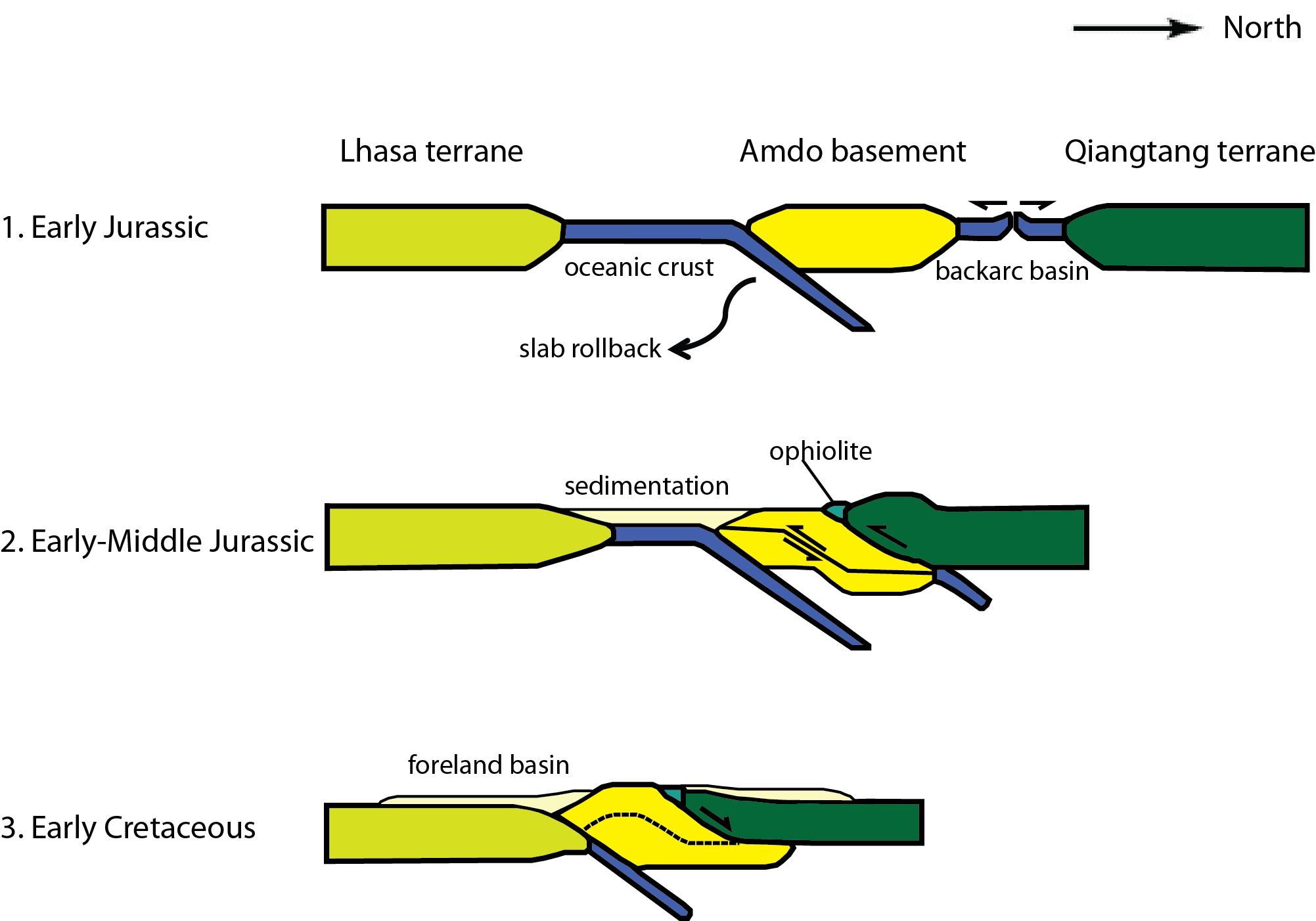
Cross section depicting the tectonic evolution of the Bangong suture zone. 1. An oceanic backarc basin forms separating the Amdo basement from the Qiangtang terrane. Slab rollback is a possible explanation for this extension. 2. Continued subduction of oceanic crust in the early-middle Jurassic. Closure of the oceanic back arc basin causes ophiolite obduction and a period of metamorphism in the Amdo basement. 3. In the early Cretaceous, the Lhasa and Qiangtang terranes collide creating the Bangong suture. A foreland basin also forms at this time. Cross section is modified from Guynn et al., 2006.

== Implications of the Bangong suture ==
Classical interpretations of plate tectonics indicates that deformation from the Eurasian-Indian collision should be concentrated along the subduction zone. The Tibetan system does not act in this way, however, with significant deformation occurring along the north and north-east flanks of the Tibetan Plateau. To solve this problem, two end-member models were proposed: a "soft Tibet" model and micro-plate tectonics. According to the "soft Tibet" model, the lithosphere behaves as a thin viscous sheet to accommodate broadly distributed shortening of both crust and lithospheric mantle. Micro-plate tectonics suggests that each terrane acts on its own, according to its own boundaries, and the sutures between them (including the Bangong suture between the Lhasa and Qiangtang) are reactivated in the Cenozoic.

== End member model predictions ==
Each of the two models makes a different prediction for reactivation along the Bangong suture. The "soft Tibet" model suggests that a series of small multiple faults along the suture zone would occur, due to the ductile nature of the lithosphere. Based on the micro-plate tectonics model, large strike-slip faults with significant displacement should be present. Crustal extrusion (in the form of sinistral strike-slip faults) should also be present and would be caused by oblique subduction at the edges of the suture zone. Understanding the evolution and structure of these faults as well as other boundary faults (faults that surround the Tibetan plateau) is important to constraining the formation and deformation of the Tibetan Plateau. Research to identify features in the field that would satisfy either of these hypotheses is ongoing.

== See also ==
- High pressure terranes along the Bangong-Nujiang Suture Zone
