= Indus-Yarlung suture zone =

Tectonic suture in southern Tibet

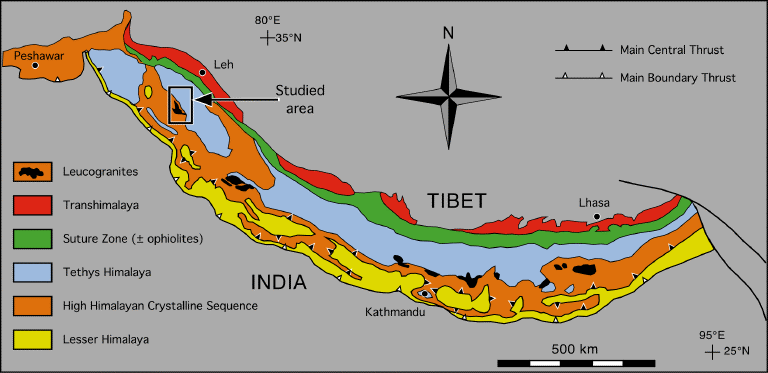
Map of the Himalaya region. Green is the Indus-Yarlung suture zone

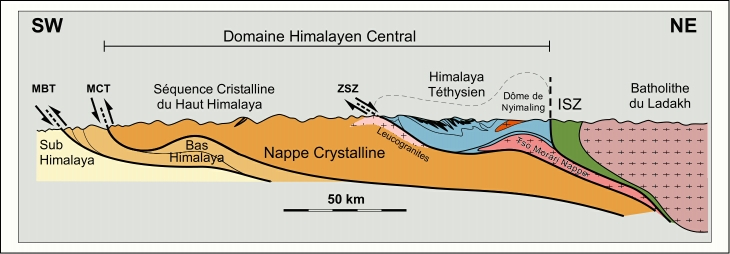
Cross section of the Himalaya, the suture zone is shown in green

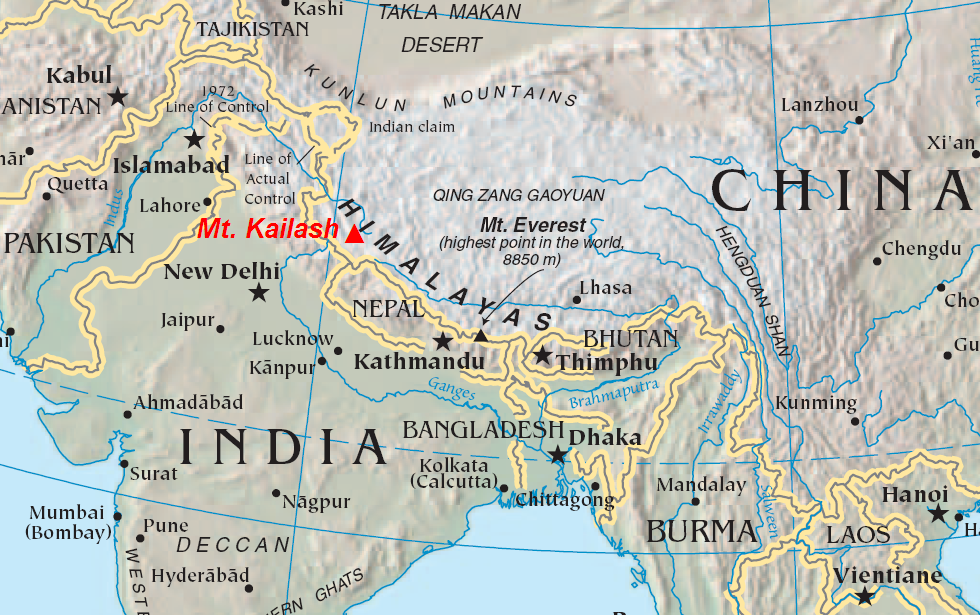
Location of Mt. Kailash. Indus-Yarlung Zangbo suture zone, the Yarlung Tsangpo River is sometimes called upper Brahmaputra River.

The Indus-Yarlung suture zone or the Indus-Yarlung Tsangpo suture is a tectonic suture in southern Tibet and across the north margin of the Himalayas which resulted from the collision between the Indian plate and the Eurasian plate starting about 52 Ma. The north side of the suture zone is the Ladakh Batholith of the Karakoram-Lhasa Block. The rocks of the suture zone consist of an ophiolite mélanges composed of Neotethys oceanic crustal flyschs and ophiolites; the Dras Volcanics: which are basalts, dacites and minor radiolarian cherts – the remains of a mid- to late Mesozoic volcanic island arc; and the Indus Molasse which are an Eocene or later continental clastic sediments.

The ophiolites within the Indus-Yarlung suture zone occur in two discontinuous belts. During the trench-continent collision, segments of the crust and upper mantle were emplaced onto the Indian plate. However, following the collision of the Indian and Eurasian plates, the northern segment of ophiolitic rock was backthrust onto the edge of the Eurasian plate, separating from the southern ophiolite group and forming two distinct belts.

Some think that the many ophiolites that define the suture are not remnants of a very big ocean, but of a small back-arc basin structure. More recently it has been suggested that these ophiolites formed during Early Cretaceous subduction initiation (Hu and Stern, 2020).

== See also ==
- Geology of the Himalaya – Origins and structure of the Himalayan Mountain range
