= Pre-collisional Himalaya =

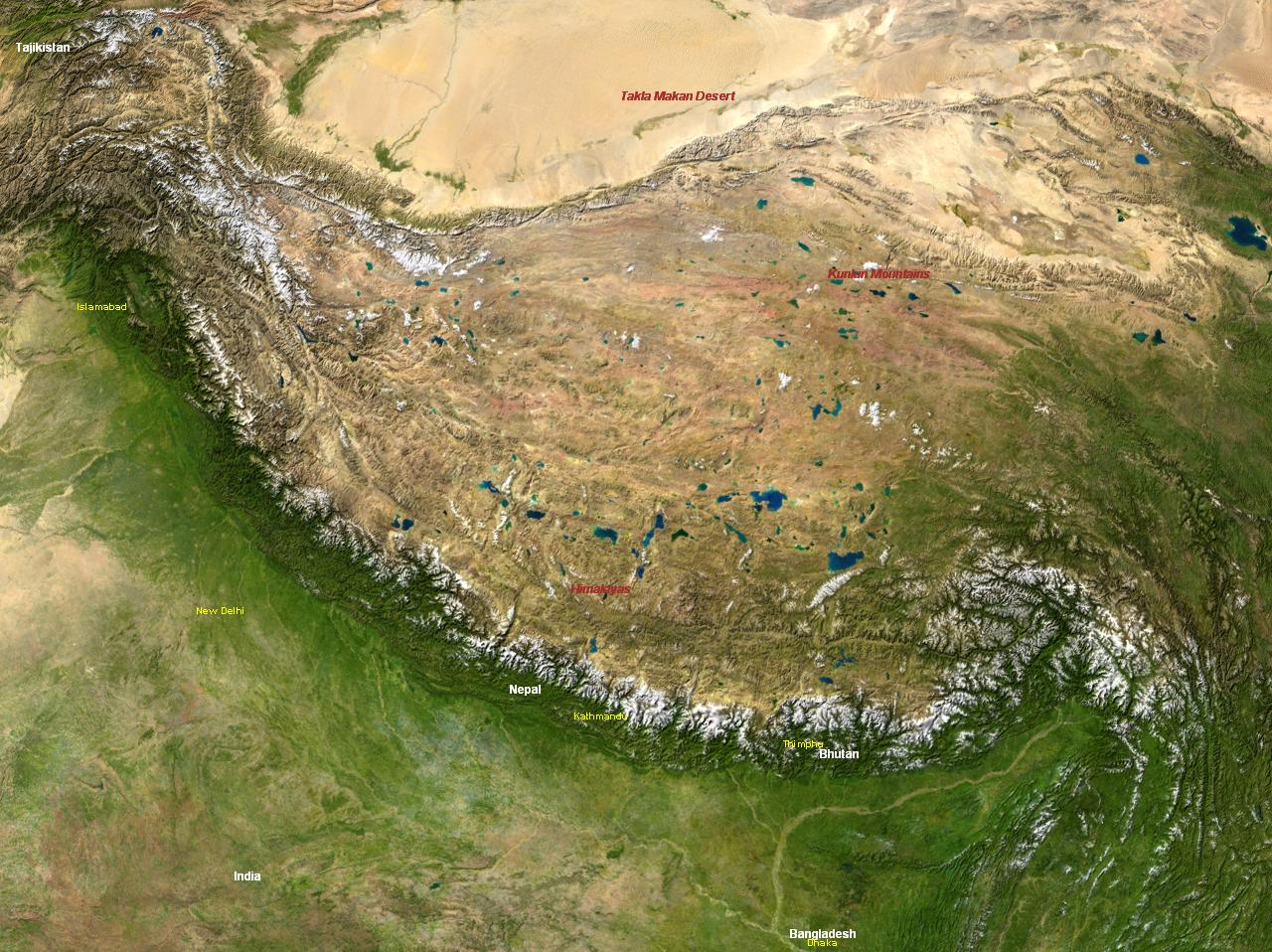
Satellite image of the Himalayas

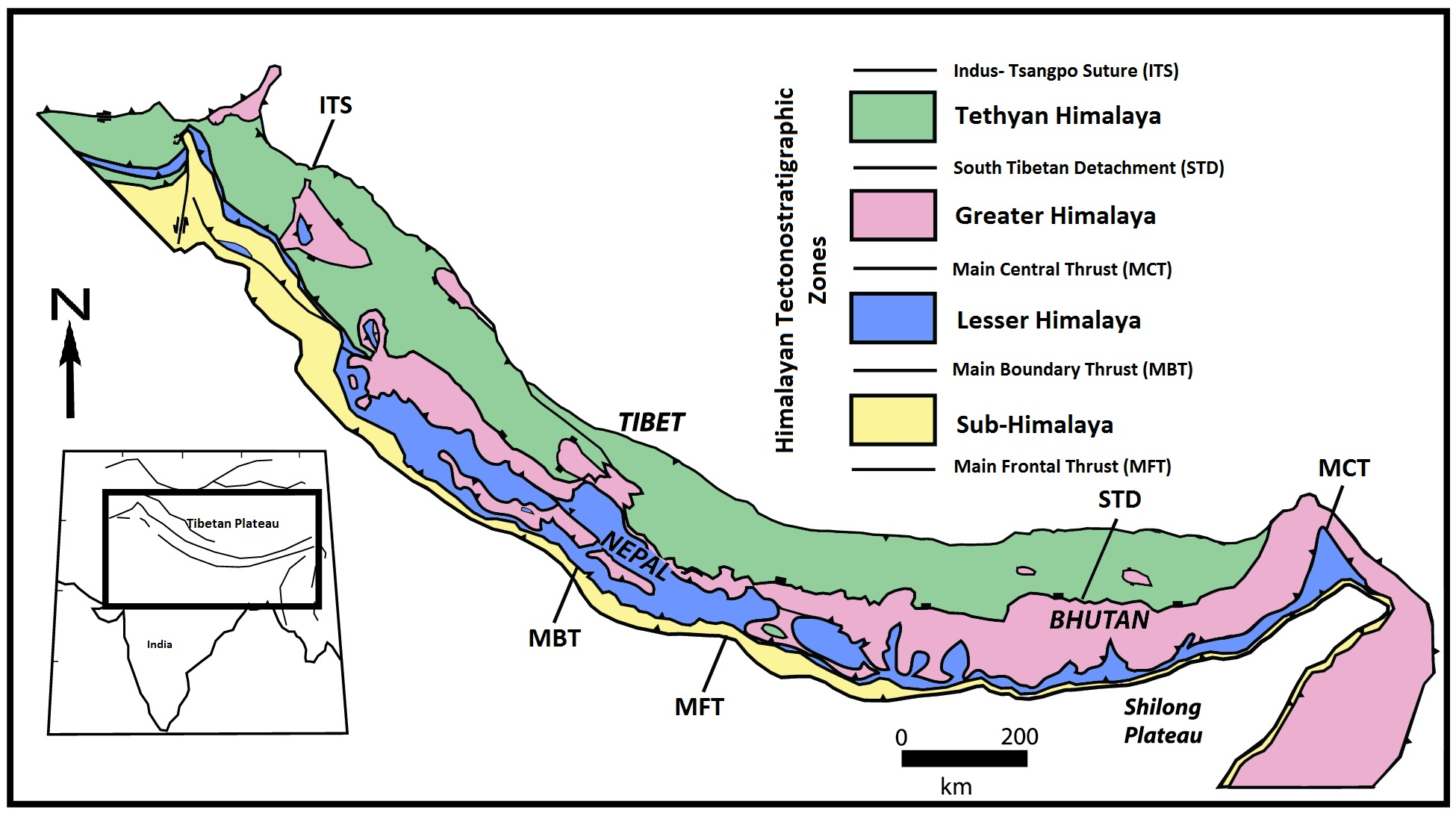
Spatial arrangement of the Himalayan tectonostratigraphic zones. Modified from N.R. McKenzie et al 2011

Pre-collisional Himalaya is the arrangement of the Himalayan rock units before mountain-building processes resulted in the collision of Asia and India. The collision began in the Cenozoic and it is a type locality of a continental-continental collision. The reconstruction of the initial configuration of the rock units and the relationship between them is highly controversial, and major concerns relate to the arrangements of the different rock units in three dimensions. Several models have been advanced to explain the possible arrangements and petrogenesis of the rock units.

== Major rock units in Himalaya ==
In the Himalaya, the rock units are conventionally divided into four major sections. From North to South, they are:

- Tethyan Himalayan sequence
- Greater Himalayan crystalline complex
- Lesser Himalayan sequence
- Sub-Himalayan sequence

The Tethyan Himalayan sequence, Greater Himalayan crystalline complex, and Lesser Himalayan sequence are grouped together as the North Indian sequence due to the overlapping age from Proterozoic to Phanerozoic. For Pre-collisional Himalaya, only the North Indian Sequence is of concern as the Sub-Himalayan sequence is a rock unit that was deposited at the same time as the India and Asia collision and the resulting mountain-building process.

=== Tethyan Himalayan sequence ===
The Tethyan Himalayan sequence is composed of mainly siliciclastic and carbonate sedimentary rocks deposited from 1840 Ma to 40 Ma. These are inter-bedded with volcanic rocks of Paleozoic and Mesozoic age. This sequence is divided into several sub-units due to the different lithofacies present in the sequence. The lithofacies of the rocks are a result of the shift in the depositional environment. Specific to this sequence, the Carboniferous to Jurassic rifting event was the cause of the changing depositional environment. In particular, the rifting event initiated the opening of the Tethys Ocean during which the Cimmerian Plate travelled north and moved away from Gondwana. The boundary and age between the several sub-units are poorly constrained, yet the whole sequence is generally considered to have first developed in Neoproterozoic. The 1840 Ma of the rocks was determined by rubidium–strontium dating of the Baragoan gneiss, however some have allocated the gneiss into the Lesser Himalayan Sequence instead.

=== Greater Himalayan crystalline complex ===
Generally, the Greater Himalayan crystalline complex is a belt of high-grade metamorphic rocks that extends along the east-trending length of the Himalayan range. It contains leucogranites interspersed throughout the entire complex, and they are early to middle Miocene of age. The complex is sandwiched by two major faults, with the Main Central Thrust in the south and the South Tibetan Detachment to the North. Additionally, the Tethyan Himalayan sequence overlies the complex. The estimated age of the complex ranges from 1800 Ma to 480 Ma, however these ages are poorly constrained. From bottom to top, the metamorphic grade of the complex first increases up section, it is then reversed, with the metamorphic grade decreasing up section. The transition occurs between the middle and top portions of the complex. In addition, inverted metamorphism appears at Central Nepal.

=== Lesser Himalayan sequence ===
The Lesser Himalayan sequence is characterized by low-grade meta-sedimentary rocks, metavolcanic rocks and augen gneiss. The majority of the sequence is marine deposits, however, most of the sequence does not contain any fossils; only in rare instances will a formation contain fossils. Major formations of the sequence include the Tal Formation, Gondwana Strata, Singtali Formation, and Subathu Formation. The entire sequence has an age range of 1870 Ma to 520 Ma. In North West India, the sequence is overlain by the Cambrian strata, while in Pakistan, Cambrian or Carboniferous strata from the Tibetan Himalaya sequence overlays the Mesoproterozic strata of the Lower Himalayan sequence.

== Concepts ==
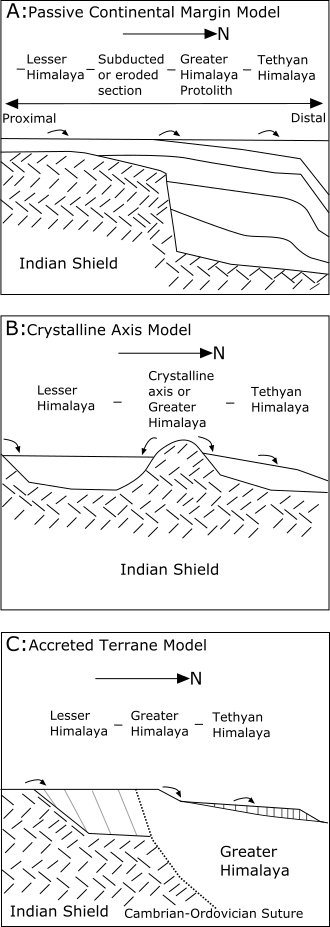
Models on the reconstruction of Pre-tectonic Himalaya (curly arrows represents the direction of sedimentation), modified from Yin (2006), Myrow (2003), DeCelles (2000)

The initial configuration of pre-collisional Himalaya can be expressed in the four following models:

- Passive continental margin model
- Crystalline axis model
- Accreted terrane model
- Carboniferous-extension model

=== Passive continental margin model ===
==== Background ====
This model is a single margin model. Here, the North Indian sequence was deposited on a continental margin of northern India that was facing north. The units in the North Indian sequence represents the same set of sediments, but became distinct, since nearshore and offshore conditions changes the characteristics of the rock units during deposition.

==== Predictions ====
This model predicts that all three units–namely, the Lesser Himalayan, Greater Himalayan, and Tethyan Himalayan–must have a nearly identical depositional age and depositional setting, and are derived from similar sources. Immediately, primary evidence from detrital zircon ages, paleocurrent recorded in the units, and animal similarities supports these predictions. Firstly, the detrital zircon data for the Lesser Himalaya and Tethyan Himalaya sequence yield similar age spectra when similar aged samples were used. Furthermore, when samarium–neodymium dating of the entire North Indian sequence was made, significant overlap of Nd isotopic signatures between the different rocks units indicates a sharing of similar sources.

Secondly, the paleocurrent data orientated from south-south west to north-north east is common to both Lesser Himalaya and Tethyan Himalaya, more specifically in the Tal Group and Kunzam La Formation, respectively. Moreover, the lithology of the two sequences connotes a fluvial depositional setting and the lithofacies of the rocks strongly supports the idea that the Lesser Himalaya and Tethyan Himalaya represent nearshore and offshore portions of a continental margin. Finally, both sequences contain the same Early Cambrian equatorial trilobite species, reinforcing the likelihood of the passive continental margin model.

Additionally, it is proposed that the protolith of the Greater Himalaya may have been sedimentary in nature and correlate with the Lesser and Tethyan Himalayan sequences. Although precise matching of the ancient stratigraphy of the Greater Himalaya with the other zones is not possible, the Greater Himalayan sequence shares correlative strata with Neoproterozoic to Cambrian age rocks in Tethyan Himalaya. Similar transition from siliciclastic rocks to carbonates occurs in both sequences in strata of similar ages. In spite of the metamorphic grade of Greater Himalaya, the protolith lithology is nevertheless similar to the other zones and possibly shares the same depositional setting.

==== Problems ====
Brookfield opposes the model by explaining that in the Lesser Himalaya, thick and well developed strata, younger than Precambrian of age, are absent, while it is very well preserved in Tethyan Himalaya. DeCelles et al. also demonstrated that this model fails to explain the relationship of Greater Himalaya and Lesser Himalaya, along the main central thrust in Nepal. In addition, Spencer et al. achieved contrasting results in the εNd values, revealing a more negative value in Lesser Himalaya compared to both the Greater Himalaya and Tethyan Himalaya, suggesting different sources amongst the sequences. The latter two have values that resemble the Arabian Shield and Eastern Antarctica, which conflict with the Indian Shield source that composes Lesser Himalaya.

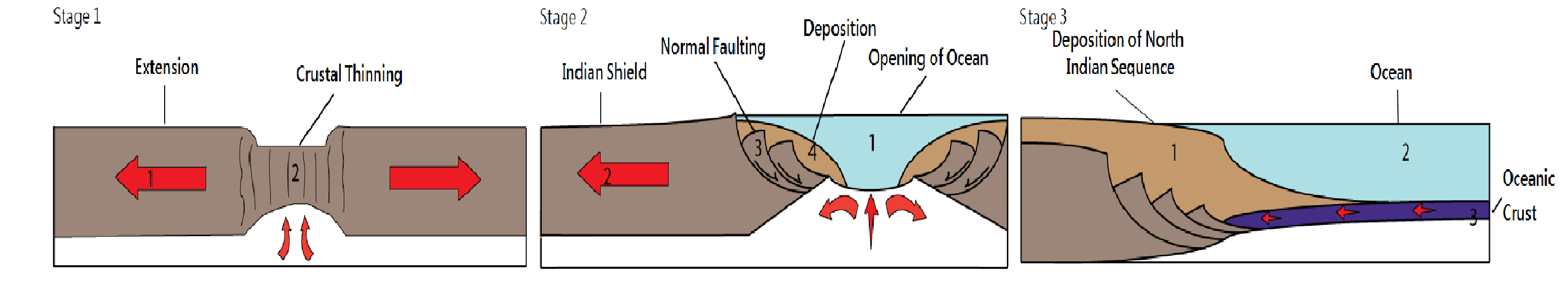
Tectonic evolution of the passive continental margin model

=== Crystalline axis model ===
==== Background ====
This model posits that the Lesser and Tethyan Himalaya were deposited in distinct basins that are separated by the Greater Himalaya complex.

==== Problems ====
Results of the zircon ages and possible protolith lithologies and their corresponding first-order similarities between the rock units from Myrow et al. have generally discredited this model. To begin with, the Greater Himalaya yields younger detrital zircon ages than that of Lesser and Tethyan Himalaya, which makes it very unlikely for Greater Himalaya to be a topographic high that separates two depositional basins. All the evidence that supports the passive margin model is also problematic for this model, since the strong paleontological, lithological, and sedimentological relationships between Lesser and Tethyan Himalaya basically rejects the connotation that they were once separated. Missing suture zone rocks in the Main Central Thrust also makes it difficult to explain this model.

=== Accreted terrane model ===
==== Background ====
In this model, Lesser and Greater Himalaya were developed in separate areas during Precambrian to Cambrian, and soon after in late Cambrian to Early Ordovician. Greater Himalaya accreted as an exotic terrane into the Northern India margin and came into contact with Lesser Himalaya. Tethyan Himalaya was later deposited on top of Greater Himalaya as an overlying sequence.

==== Predictions ====
This reconstruction predicts that the Greater Himalaya thrust over Lesser Himalayan rocks during the early Paleozoic. As such. it is able to more successfully explain the age relationship between the strata across the main central thrust. Other models would require greater slip along the main central thrust during the Cenozoic orogeny to achieve the present stratigraphical arrangement. Deformation produced by Paleozoic tectonics may have been overprinted by the Cenozoic reactivation of the main central thrust, which result in the lack of old suture zone rocks. Moreover, aligned with this model, sediments in northern India have experienced a transition from turbidites to syn-collision sediments in Cambrian to Ordovician. Additional evidence with regard to isotopic signatures and detrital zircon ages may also increase the credibility of this model. Further investigation is required to support more predictions of this model, since metamorphism of the Greater Himalayan strata in the early Paleozoic, and Cambrian to Ordovician syn-tectonic sediments in Tethyan Himalaya, are lacking.

==== Problems ====
This model fails to reconcile with detrital zircon ages, and paleontological evidence with respect to the similarities between Tethyan and Lesser Himalaya. Similar to the crystalline axis model, this model faces the same challenges with respect to the evidence that supports the passive margin model. Trilobite fauna, paleocurrent and lithological similarities would be unlikely if the rock units were formed in separate terranes as explained by Myrow et al. Earlier predictions that suggest a thrust/ shortening event in Tethyan Himalaya in the early Paleozoic, and the simultaneous formation of granitic intrusions under the sequence, were also undermined by the apparent rifting isotopic signatures in the granites.

Tectonic Evolution of the Accreted Terrane Model, Grey= Oceanic Plate, Blue= Lesser Himalaya, Pink= Greater Himalaya, Green= Tethyan Himalaya (MBT= Main Boundary Thrust, MCT= Main Central Thrust, STD= South Tibetan Detachment)

=== Carboniferous-extension model ===
==== Background ====
This model illustrates that in Carboniferous, due to possible rifting, the Lesser and Greater Himalaya were separated by a north-dipping normal fault. In this reconstruction, the former is the footwall and the latter is the hanging wall.

==== Predictions ====
This model explains the apparent missing lower Paleozoic strata in Lesser Himalaya due to footwall uplift and erosion, and provides a possible solution to the age relationship across the main central thrust by the reactivation of this ancient normal fault.

==== Problems ====
Vannay et al. explains that the missing strata in Lesser Himalaya could be a result of glaciation in late Carboniferous. Similar to the passive margin model, this model also implies that all the zones within the North Indian sequence share the same source; however, the εNd value and detrital zircon ages are currently controversial and may not favor this interpretation.

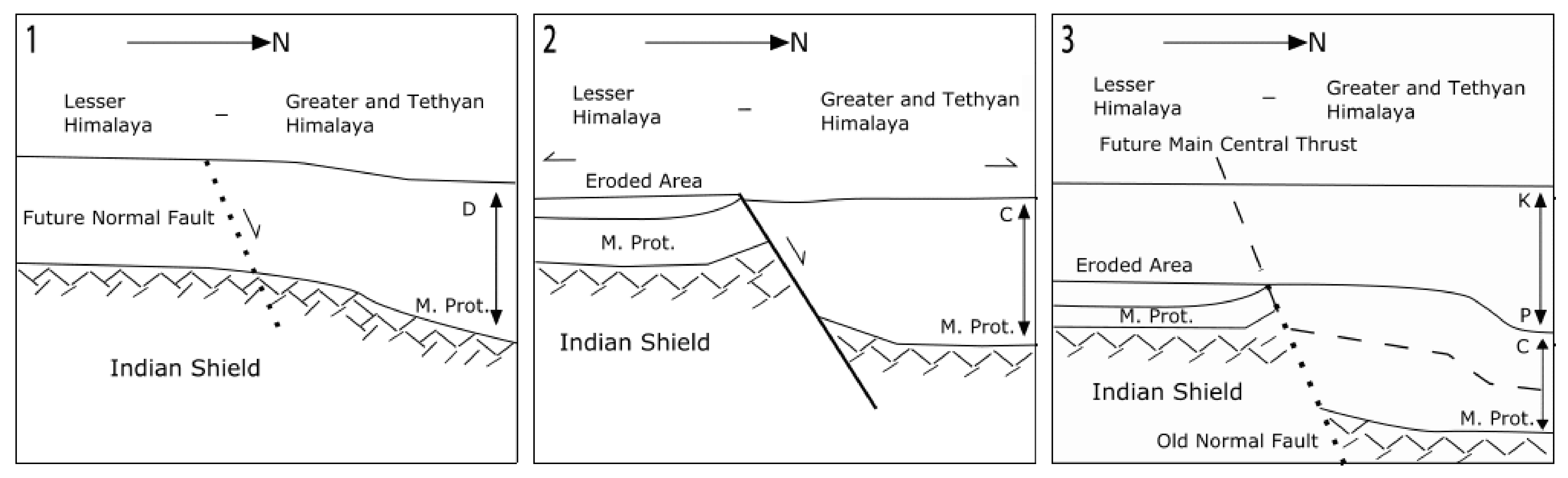
Evolution of the Carboniferous-extension model, modified from Yin (2006). Age abbreviations: M. Prot- Mesoproterozoic, D- Devonian, C- Carboniferous, P- Permian, K- Cretaceous.

== Model comparison ==
	Predictions				
Models	Same source	Older Greater Himalaya	Early Paleozoic tectonics	Current age relationships along the Main Central Thrust	Rifting in Carboniferous
Passive Continental Margin Model	✔	×	×	×	×
Crystalline Axis Model	×	✔	×	×	×
Accreted Terrane Model	×	×	✔	✔	×
Carboniferous- extension Model	✔	×	×	✔	✔

== See also ==
- Geology of Nepal
- Geology of the Himalaya
- Main Central Thrust
- South Tibetan Detachment
