= 1988 Nepal earthquake =

Earthquake near the Nepal–India border

1988 Nepal Earthquake
- Location within Nepal
- UTC time: 1988-08-20 23:09:09
- ISC event: 429573
- USGS-ANSS: ComCat
- Local date: August 21, 1988
- Local time: 04:39:11 NST
- Magnitude: 6.9 M_{w}
- Depth: 57.4 km (35.7 mi)
- Epicenter: 26.755°N 86.616°E
- Max. intensity: MMI VIII (Severe)
- Casualties: 1,003 deaths, 9,979 injuries

The 1988 Nepal earthquake occurred near the Nepal–India border on 20 August 1988 at 23:09:09 UTC. The epicenter was located in Udayapur District. Measuring M_{w} 6.9, it was the largest earthquake recorded in the country since 1934.

The death toll in Nepal and Bihar stood at 1,003. This was worsened by hillside erosion, landslide and floods, which increased the death toll by almost 300. There was significant damage to buildings and infrastructure including schools and hospitals, which left up to half a million people homeless, which had a significant impact of health and desolated the economy. This led to overcrowding and a lack of sanitation, which contributed to health conditions. Local and international response relief efforts were hindered by the heavy monsoon, mountainous terrain, infrastructure damage, lack of helicopters and uncoordinated response.

== Geology ==
The entire region lies above two converging tectonic plates, the Indian and Eurasian plate. These plates are converging at a rate of 40–50 mm/year. The Indian plate is continuously subducting beneath the Eurasian plate, rendering the entire of Hindu-Kush-Himalaya region prone to earthquakes. There are three major thrust faults in the region, the Main Central Thrust (MCT), Main Boundary Thrust (MBT) and the Main Frontal Thrust (MFT). This earthquake occurred in the Siwalik sedimentary region and involved oblique faulting with a combination of strike-slip and thrust fault movements contributing to the release of tectonic stress.

Within 39 days of the mainshock, the Department of Mines and Geology recorded 155 aftershocks. Six of which had a magnitude greater than 4M_{w}.

== Damage and casualties ==
In addition to the magnitude of earthquakes, the local geology and the building techniques also affect the extent of damage and devastation. The major causes of fatalities and injuries were from the structural damage to the buildings caused by ground vibration, liquefaction, and landslides. Similar damage to buildings occurred in the northern region of Bihar in India. Considerable damage to buildings were reported in the eastern city of Dharan, rendering thousands of people homeless. The buildings were not constructed to withstand the geological forces of nature as the brick masonry buildings used traditional and poor quality of construction, lacked maintenance, and the foundation designs were inadequate to resist the effects of liquefaction. The lack of regard for the risks of earthquake was evident from the fact, that until 1994, there was no legislation or protocol requirement for earthquake resistant building designs and construction in Nepal; the 1988 earthquake instigated the development of safety initiatives and building codes.

More than 720 fatalities and significant number of injuries were recorded, predominantly in the eastern plains and mountains as well as in some areas in the central mountainous region of Nepal. The earthquake caused extensive damage to critical infrastructures, including houses, public buildings, schools, roads, bridges, as well as irrigation canals and water supplies. Damage to the Mahendra Highway at several places and disruption to telecommunications hindered access to the hardest hit areas. Bihar state in India accounted for over 280 deaths and numerous injuries.

The immediate aftermath of the earthquake saw a surge in injuries due to building collapses. Many of these injuries were severe, including crush injuries and fractures, requiring urgent medical attention. The destruction of healthcare infrastructure and the displacement of populations led to an increased risk of infectious disease outbreaks. Poor sanitation, lack of clean water, and overcrowded shelters contributed to the spread of diseases such as diarrhoea, respiratory infections, and fever.

The earthquake impacted educational attainment among children in the worst-affected areas, with the likelihood of completing secondary and tertiary education decreasing by 13.8 percent and 10 percent, respectively. Children from lower caste groups were the most severely affected, with a 17.6 percent reduction in the likelihood of completing secondary education, while children from higher castes were not significantly affected. At the same time, male children perform significantly better than female children in schooling, indicating gender bias in society. These reductions in education levels are directly linked to future health status, with less educated populations typically facing higher health risks and poorer health management skills. The study highlights that natural disasters not only affect education but also have a profound negative impact on children's human capital accumulation and health.

Reports from a Japanese natural disaster study group showed that the casualties were higher among females, children and the elderly, compared to young males, due to their reduced ability to escape from the physical impact of the disaster. In the aftermath, personnel at the British military hospital based at Dharan described their experience of lack of facilities in dealing with mass casualties that was compounded by communication loss. They also highlighted the plight of pregnant ladies in labour. The extensive damage to school buildings affected approximately 300,000 children for several months.

== Response ==
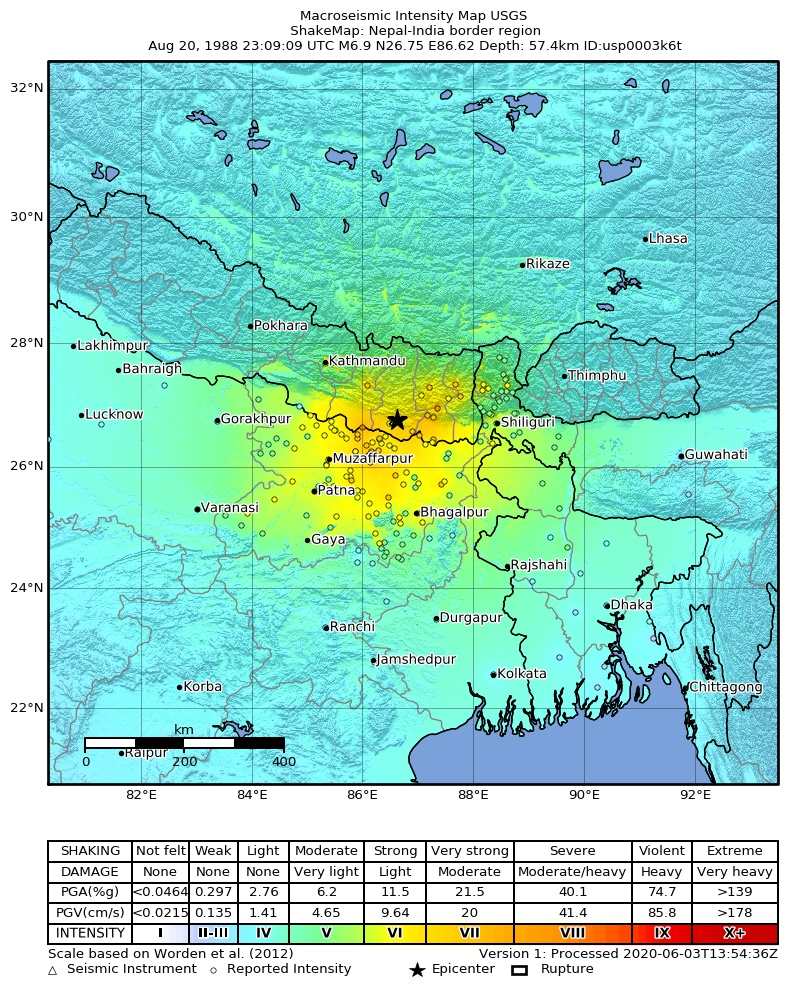
Strong ground motion map

The Nepal government reacted mobilised resources and coordinated efforts across various agencies. The Royal Nepal Army, police, local officials, and the Nepal Red Cross Society collaborated to address the hardest-hit areas, such as Dharan and Dhankuta, despite the government's limited resources. Search and rescue teams were immediately dispatched from Kathmand while the army transported survivors to hospitals. Helicopters were essential in reaching isolated regions to transport survivors to medical facilities.

Heavy monsoon rains followed soon after the earthquake, significantly hindering local relief efforts. The effects of these rains were especially challenging in mountainous regions with poor road infrastructure, where helicopters were the only viable option for reaching affected communities. The Nepalese Red Cross provided essential supplies, including food, clothing, blankets, and utensils, particularly in areas where local government support was insufficient. To coordinate the relief, the Home Secretary established the Central Disaster Relief Committee, which allocated over US$300,000 in disaster relief funds to the Eastern Zone.

== International response ==
The United Nations Office for Disaster Risk Reduction quickly recognised the extent of the disaster and launched an international appeal, focusing on monetary donations rather than material aid. The United States was one of the major donors, contributing over $380,000 to supply medical materials, disaster consultants, and plastic sheeting for temporary shelters. Japan also provided critical support, including around 2,000 blankets, medical supplies, and additional relief items, valued at approximately US$450,000. Despite this extensive support, the international response encountered significant logistical challenges. The mountainous terrain, combined with widespread road damage, limited the efficiency of many relief efforts. Helicopters were in short supply and remained the only reliable means of accessing the most affected areas, slowing the distribution of crucial resources. Coordination issues also contributed to delays, emphasising the need for robust disaster response frameworks that can aid countries facing challenging conditions.

== Legacy ==
Weak infrastructure, specifically medical facilities, transportation systems and communication networks, were particularly exposed after the earthquake. The destruction of roads and bridges after the earthquake resulted in the inability of relief supplies and personnel to reach the affected areas promptly. Future earthquakes could cause even greater damage unless regular reinforcements and countermeasures are implemented.

After the 1988 Nepal earthquake, several disaster mitigation programmes were implemented in Nepal. The Nepal Seismic Safety Centre (NSET) initiated the School Seismic Safety Program in 1998. The program helped to strengthen school buildings, their non-structural components. It was later expanded to include first aid training, disaster response plans, and the integration of Disaster Risk Management into school curricula.

== See also ==
- List of earthquakes in 1988
- List of earthquakes in India
- List of earthquakes in Nepal
