= List of earthquakes in 1988 =

Earthquakes in 1988
Approximate epicenters of the earthquakes in 1988
- 4.0–5.9 magnitude
- 6.0–6.9 magnitude
- 7.0–7.9 magnitude
- 8.0+ magnitude
- Strongest magnitude: 7.9 M_{w} USA
- Deadliest: 6.8 M_{w} Armenia; 25,000 deaths
- Total fatalities: 26,759

Number by magnitude
- 9.0+: 0

This is a list of earthquakes in 1988. Only magnitude 6.0 or greater earthquakes appear on the list. Lower magnitude events are included if they have caused death, injury, or damage. All dates are listed according to UTC time. Maximum intensities are indicated on the Modified Mercalli intensity scale and are sourced from United States Geological Survey (USGS) ShakeMap or the National Geophysical Data Center. Earthquake activity in 1988 was relatively low, with only 11 major events and none of magnitude 8.0+ occurring. Nevertheless, extremely destructive events took place in Burma, Nepal, China and Armenia. Burma saw two deadly earthquakes just a few months apart with the latter (on the Chinese border) claiming the lives of nearly a thousand. The Armenia earthquake in December was the deadliest earthquake in this year, with more than 25,000 deaths recorded. Early this year, Australia was also struck by an unusual series of strong earthquakes.

== Overall ==
=== By death toll ===
Rank	Death toll	Magnitude	Location	MMI	Depth (km)	Date
1	25,000 – 50,000	6.8	Soviet Union, Soviet Armenia	X (Extreme)	5.4	December 7
2	938	7.7	China, Burma, Myanmar–China border region	X (Extreme)	17.8	November 6
3	709	6.9	Nepal, Province No. 1	VIII (Severe)	57.4	August 20
4	74	4.3 (explosion)	Papua New Guinea	( )	−	September 9
5	33	7.3	Myanmar, Sagaing Region	VI (Strong)	90.5	August 6

- Note: At least 10 casualties

=== By magnitude ===
Rank	Magnitude	Death toll	Location	MMI	Depth (km)	Date
= 1	7.8	0	United States, Gulf of Alaska	V (Moderate)	10.0	March 6
= 2	7.7	938	China, Burma, Myanmar–China border region	X (Extreme)	17.8	November 6
= 3	7.6	0	Solomon Islands, offshore	VII (Very strong)	34.0	August 10
= 4	7.3	33	Burma, Sagaing Region	VI (Strong)	90.5	August 6
= 4	7.3	0	Philippines, offshore Catanduanes	VII (Very strong)	24.9	February 2
= 5	7.2	0	Chile, Antofagasta	VII (Very strong)	36.9	February 5
= 6	7.1	0	Tonga offshore	( )	35.2	October 8
= 6	7.1	0	Peru offshore	( )	33.1	April 12
= 7	7.0	0	Indonesia, Maluku Islands	VI (Strong)	27.7	July 25
= 7	7.0	0	Papua New Guinea, New Britain region	( )	16.6	July 23
= 7	7.0	0	Chile, Antofagasta	VII (Very strong)	33.0	January 19

- Note: At least 7.0 magnitude

== Notable events ==
=== January ===
January
- Strongest magnitude: 7.0 M_{w} Chile
- Total fatalities: 0

Number by magnitude
- 8.0–8.9: 0
- 7.0–7.9: 1
- 6.0–6.9: 8

Date	Country and location	M_{w}	Depth (km)	MMI	Notes	Casualties	
Date	Country and location	M_{w}	Depth (km)	MMI	Notes	Dead	Injured
2	Japan, Hokkaido	6.0	117.1	IV		-	-
3	China, Nei Mongol-Ningxia border region	5.2	14.3	VI	16 livestock killed and more than 10,000 homes collapsed.	-	60
9	Albania	5.9	24.0	VII	Damage to properties reported in Tirana and the surrounding villages.	-	-
12	New Zealand, Kermadec Islands	6.6	14.8	-		-	-
15	Tonga	6.4	213.7	-		-	-
19	Chile, Antofagasta	7.0	33.0	V		-	-
21	Vanuatu	6.2	44.2	-		-	-
22	Australia, Northern Territory	6.3	5.0	VII	The first in a series of triplet earthquakes known as the 1988 Tennant Creek earthquakes.	-	-
22	Australia, Northern Territory	6.3	5.0	VIII	Second Tennant Creek earthquake mainshock.	-	-
22	Australia, Northern Territory	6.7	5.0	IX	The largest earthquake ever recorded in what is now Australia and the largest of the Tennant Creek earthquake sequence. Damaged pipelines were reported and a hospital was damaged. Total damage amounted to $2.5 million.		
29	Tonga	6.0	106.2	-		-	-

=== February ===
February
- Strongest magnitude: 7.3 M_{w} Philippines
- Deadliest: 5.9 M_{w} Bangladesh 2 dead
- Total fatalities: 2

Number by magnitude
- 8.0–8.9: 0
- 7.0–7.9: 2
- 6.0–6.9: 12

Date	Country and location	M_{w}	Depth (km)	MMI	Notes	Casualties	
Date	Country and location	M_{w}	Depth (km)	MMI	Notes	Dead	Injured
5	Chile, Antofagasta	7.2	36.9	VII	Second mainshock, caused some damages in Taltal. A tsunami of 10 cm was reported.	-	-
5	Chile, near the coast of Antofagasta	6.5	30.7	VI	Aftershock of the 7.2 earthquake nearly five hours later.	-	-
6	Bangladesh, India-Bangladesh border region	5.9	33.0	VI	Damage reported in Sylhel. Felt throughout the country, and in Tripura, Assam and Meghalaya, India.	2	100
6	Indonesia, Kepulauan Tanimbar	6.2	38.5	-		-	-
6	Bolivia, Oruro	6.5	285.2	-		-	-
6	Tonga	6.2	125.5	-		-	-
7	United States, 75 km WNW of Ninilchik, Alaska	6.4	134.0	V		-	-
7	United States, south of the Aleutian Islands	6.4	33.0	-		-	-
13	Soviet Union, Kazakhstan	6.1	-	-	Nuclear explosion	-	-
16	United States, Rat Islands, Aleutian Islands, Alaska	6.0	33.0	-		-	-
20	Indonesia, Kepulauan Barat Daya	6.5	314.5	IV		-	-
22	Chile, Tarapaca	6.7	70.3	VII		-	-
24	Philippines, Catanduanes	7.3	24.9	VII		-	-
26	Southwest Indian Ridge	6.8	10.0	-		-	-
29	Soviet Union, Komandorskiye Ostrova	6.9	33.0	-		-	-

=== March ===
March
- Strongest magnitude: 7.8 M_{w}United States
- Total fatalities: 0

Number by magnitude
- 8.0–8.9: 0
- 7.0–7.9: 1
- 6.0–6.9: 8

Date	Country and location	M_{w}	Depth (km)	MMI	Notes	Casualties	
Date	Country and location	M_{w}	Depth (km)	MMI	Notes	Dead	Injured
6	United States, Gulf of Alaska	7.8	10.0	V	It is the largest earthquake of the year. Damage to the vessels Exxon North Slope, Exxon Boston and Exxon New Orleans amounted to some US$5,000. A tsunami of 38 cm was recorded.	-	-
6	United States, Gulf of Alaska	6.2	10.0	-	Aftershock	-	-
10	Trinidad and Tobago offshore	6.7	56.2	VI		-	-
10	Fiji	6.6	623.0	-		-	-
11	Costa Rica, Panama-Costa Rica border region	6.0	22.5	VI		-	-
18	Bismarck Sea	6.2	33.0	-		-	-
21	Laptev Sea	6.5	10.0	-		-	-
23	northern Mid-Atlantic Ridge	6.2	10.0	-		-	-
25	Canada, Northwest Territories	6.2	10.0	-		-	-
30	Iran	5.9	32.9	VI	Some damage reported	-	-

=== April ===
April
- Strongest magnitude: 7.1 M_{w} Peru
- Total fatalities: 0

Number by magnitude
- 8.0–8.9: 0
- 7.0–7.9: 1
- 6.0–6.9: 8

Date	Country and location	M_{w}	Depth (km)	MMI	Notes	Casualties	
Date	Country and location	M_{w}	Depth (km)	MMI	Notes	Dead	Injured
4	Tonga	6.3	33.0	-		-	-
4	Soviet Union, Kazakhstan	6.1	0.0	-	Nuclear explosion	-	-
4	Japan, Kyushu offshore	6.0	39.3	V		-	-
8	Papua New Guinea, near the north coast of New Guinea	6.4	32.3	-		-	-
8	Papua New Guinea, near the north coast of New Guinea	6.1	33.0	-	Aftershock	-	-
12	Peru offshore southern coast	7.1	33.1	VII		-	-
13	Peru offshore southern coast	6.2	16.1	V	Aftershock	-	-
17	United Kingdom, South Sandwich Islands region	6.3	33.0	-		-	-
25	Solomon Islands	6.3	44.3	V		-	-

=== May ===
May
- Strongest magnitude: 6.9 M_{w} Indonesia
- Total fatalities: 0

Number by magnitude
- 8.0–8.9: 0
- 7.0–7.9: 0
- 6.0–6.9: 12

Date	Country and location	M_{w}	Depth (km)	MMI	Notes	Casualties	
Date	Country and location	M_{w}	Depth (km)	MMI	Notes	Dead	Injured
1	United Kingdom, South Sandwich Islands region	6.2	137.9	-		-	-
3	New Caledonia, southeast of the Loyalty Islands	6.1	10.8	-		-	-
4	Soviet Union, Kazakhstan	6.1	0.0	-	Nuclear explosion	-	-
4	Northern Mariana Islands, Pagan region	6.4	122.5	-		-	-
5	Chile, Easter Island region	6.3	10.0	-	-	-	-
5	Chile, Easter Island region	6.1	10.0	-	Aftershock	-	-
6	Nicaragua	6.6	86.7	VI		-	-
6	Japan, Hokkaido	6.0	72.3	V		-	-
20	central Mid-Atlantic Ridge	6.1	10.0	-		-	-
21	Chile, offshore Valparaiso	6.1	42.1	VI		-	-
22	United States, Unimak Island region	6.0	33.0	-		-	-
30	Indonesia, Kepulauan Barat Daya	6.9	86.3	VI		-	-

=== June ===
June
- Strongest magnitude: 6.7 M_{w} New Zealand; 6.7 M_{w} Mexico
- Deadliest: 6.2 M_{w} Philippines 2 dead
- Total fatalities: 2

Number by magnitude
- 8.0–8.9: 0
- 7.0–7.9: 0
- 6.0–6.9: 8

Date	Country and location	M_{w}	Depth (km)	MMI	Notes	Casualties	
Date	Country and location	M_{w}	Depth (km)	MMI	Notes	Dead	Injured
3	New Zealand, South Island	6.7	82.7	VI		-	-
5	Vanuatu	6.5	110.2	V		-	-
11	Western Samoa	6.3	35.7			-	-
12	Solomon Islands, Santa Cruz Islands	6.5	14.4	VI		-	-
18	Mexico, Gulf of California	6.7	10.0	VI		-	-
19	Philippines, Mindoro	6.2	16.7	VII	Damage was reported during the 1988 Mindoro earthquake.	2	4
24	Philippines, Luzon	5.7	53.4	V	Some damage reported in Laoag.	-	-
27	Vanuatu	6.0	65.7	-		-	-
28	Australia, west of Macquarie Island	6.0	10.0	-		-	-

=== July ===
July
- Strongest magnitude: 7.0 M_{w} Papua New Guinea; 7.0 M_{w} Indonesia
- Deadliest: 5.9 M_{w} Taiwan 1 dead
- Total fatalities: 1

Number by magnitude
- 8.0–8.9: 0
- 7.0–7.9: 2
- 6.0–6.9: 12

Date	Country and location	M_{w}	Depth (km)	MMI	Notes	Casualties	
Date	Country and location	M_{w}	Depth (km)	MMI	Notes	Dead	Injured
2	Vanuatu	6.3	142.7	IV		-	-
3	Federated States of Micronesia, State of Yap	6.6	14.6	-		-	-
5	Papua New Guinea, New Britain region	6.8	53.4	VI	Some damage was reported. Triggered a tsunami.	-	-
6	Japan, Hokkaido	6.3	30.1	-		-	-
11	Philippines, Mindanao	6.0	66.9	-		-	-
18	Soviet Union, Komandorskiye Ostrova	6.0	23.2	-		-	-
19	Tonga	6.4	137.0	-		-	-
20	Taiwan	5.9	50.8	V	Landslides blocked a highway between Hua-lien and Su-hua.	1	1
23	New Caledonia, southeast of the Loyalty Islands	6.6	18.5	-		-	-
23	Papua New Guinea, New Britain region	7.0	16.6	-		-	-
25	Indonesia, Kepulauan Aru region	7.0	27.7	VI		-	-
27	Vanuatu	6.7	171.6	IV		-	-
27	Vanuatu	6.0	176.8	-	Aftershock	-	-
28	Bolivia, Potosi	6.2	279.3	-		-	-
31	New Caledonia, southeast of the Loyalty Islands	6.6	55.5	-		-	-

=== August ===
August
- Strongest magnitude: 7.6 M_{w} Solomon Islands
- Deadliest: 6.9 M_{w} Nepal India 706-1,091 dead
- Total fatalities: 746-1,131

Number by magnitude
- 8.0–8.9: 0
- 7.0–7.9: 2
- 6.0–6.9: 13

Date	Country and location	M_{w}	Depth (km)	MMI	Notes	Casualties	
Date	Country and location	M_{w}	Depth (km)	MMI	Notes	Dead	Injured
6	Burma, Sagaing Region	7.3	90.5		Although the 1988 Myanmar–India earthquake had an epicenter in Burma, much of the devastation was in neighboring India and Bangladesh. A seiche occurred in a river which capsized a ferry, killing three and leaving 30 injured or missing. This earthquake was felt in Nepal and the Soviet Union.	33	30
6	Papua New Guinea, New Britain region	6.1	25.1			-	-
6	Afghanistan, Hindu Kush region	6.3	195.0			-	-
10	Solomon Islands	7.6	34.0		Earthquake generated a tsunami which killed one and destroyed homes in 13 villages.	1	-
10	Solomon Islands	6.6	39.8	VI	Aftershock	-	-
10	Chile, Easter Island region	6.0	10.0	-		-	-
10	Vanuatu	6.8	124.8	VI		-	-
11	Mauritius – Reunion region	6.2	10.0	-		-	-
11	Iran	6.1	33.0	VII	Some damage reported.	1	-
14	Sea of Okhotsk	6.1	644.8	-		-	-
14	Chile, offshore Atacama	6.7	32.5	VI		-	-
15	Philippines, Mindanao	6.1	52.0	V		-	-
17	Indonesia, Java	6.0	27.1	V		-	-
17	Chile, offshore Atacama	6.1	38.5	VI	Aftershock	-	-
20	Nepal, Nepal-India border region	6.9	57.4	VIII	The 1988 Nepal earthquake killed between 706 and 1,091 people on both sides of the Nepal-India border. The damage cost was about $131.5 million. A seiche in the Jamuna River killed 2 and left many missing.	706-1,091	Many

=== September ===
September
- Strongest magnitude: 6.7 M_{w} Japan
- Deadliest: Landslide PNG 74 dead
- Total fatalities: 74

Number by magnitude
- 8.0–8.9: 0
- 7.0–7.9: 0
- 6.0–6.9: 4

Date	Country and location	M_{w}	Depth (km)	MMI	Notes	Casualties	
Date	Country and location	M_{w}	Depth (km)	MMI	Notes	Dead	Injured
6	Papua New Guinea, eastern New Guinea region	4.3	0.0		The Kaiapit Landslide occurred on the Saruwaged Range where 1.3 billion m^{3} of debris flowed through two river valleys, killing 74 people. The landslide was registered on a seismograph.	74	
7	Japan, Izu Islands	6.7	485.1				
14	Soviet Union, Kazakhstan	6.1	0.0		Nuclear explosion		
14	Chile, Antofagasta	6.0	122.6				
15	Ecuador	6.2	170.2				

=== October ===
October
- Strongest magnitude: 7.1 M_{w} Tonga
- Total fatalities: 0

Number by magnitude
- 8.0–8.9: 0
- 7.0–7.9: 1
- 6.0–6.9: 4

Date	Country and location	M_{w}	Depth (km)	MMI	Notes	Casualties	
Date	Country and location	M_{w}	Depth (km)	MMI	Notes	Dead	Injured
1	southern East Pacific Rise	6.3	10.0				
4	Papua New Guinea, New Ireland region	6.1	28.5				
8	Tonga region	7.1	35.2				
10	New Zealand, Kermadec Islands	6.3	27.7				
16	Taiwan region	6.0	33.0	V			

=== November ===
November
- Strongest magnitude: 7.7 M_{w} China, Burma
- Deadliest: 7.7 M_{w} China, Burma 938 dead
- Total fatalities: 942

Number by magnitude
- 8.0–8.9: 0
- 7.0–7.9: 1
- 6.0–6.9: 2

Date	Country and location	M_{w}	Depth (km)	MMI	Notes	Casualties	
Date	Country and location	M_{w}	Depth (km)	MMI	Notes	Dead	Injured
1	United Kingdom, South Sandwich Islands region	6.3	33.0				
3	Guatemala	6.6	68.5	VII	About 100 buildings damaged. Landslides and damage to roads. Felt in El Salvador, and Mexico.	5	
3	United States, Puerto Rico region	6.0	33.3	V	Minor damage at Catano, Puerto Rico.		
5	China, southern Qinghai	6.2	7.6	IX			
5	New Caledonia, southeast of the Loyalty Islands	6.2	42.3				
6	China, Myanmar, Myanmar-China border region	7.7	17.8	IX-X	The 1988 Lancang earthquake is the largest and deadliest earthquake in Yunnan since 1970. Heavy damage and casualties were reported in Lancang and Mangliang county where over 200,000 buildings were destroyed. The earthquake could be felt in Bangladesh, Thailand, Laos and Vietnam. Total cost of damage is around US$270 million.	938	3,900
6	China, Myanmar, Myanmar-China border region	6.4	10.0	VIII	Aftershock		
7	Fiji	6.8	21.8				
7	Molucca Sea	6.0	65.7				
10	China, Guangxi	4.6	10.0	IV	Damage in Qinzhou and Fangcheng.		71
14	Papua New Guinea, New Ireland region	6.7	33.0				
17	Philippines, Samar	6.6	19.3	VII	Damage in Catarman.		29
18	Papua New Guinea, New Britain region	6.6	61.0	VI			
20	southeast Indian Ridge	6.1	10.0				
25	southeast Indian Ridge	6.3	10.0				
25	Canada, Saguenay Valley region, Quebec	5.9	28.9	VII	1988 Saguenay earthquake		
30	China, Myanmar, Myanmar-China border region	6.1	10.0	VII	Several people injured and unconfirmed reports of nearly 10 people killed.		

=== December ===
December
- Strongest magnitude: 6.8 M_{w} Soviet Union
- Deadliest: 6.8 M_{w} Soviet Union; 25,000 deaths
- Total fatalities: 25,000

Number by magnitude
- 8.0–8.9: 0
- 7.0–7.9: 0
- 6.0–6.9: 6

Date	Country and location	M_{w}	Depth (km)	MMI	Notes	Casualties	
Date	Country and location	M_{w}	Depth (km)	MMI	Notes	Dead	Injured
5	Tonga	6.4	40.1				
7	Soviet Union, Armenia	6.8	5.4	X	The 1988 Armenian earthquake was the deadliest earthquake of 1988. With an epicenter in what is now Armenia, it seriously damaged and destroyed thousands of homes and public infrastructures, killing at least 25,000 and injuring 31,000.	25,000	31,000
8	Panama	6.2	10.0				
12	Norway, Jan Mayen Island region	6.0	10.0				
23	New Zealand, Kermadec Islands	6.4	30.7				
24	Argentina, Jujuy	6.1	193.6				
