= Geology of Nepal =

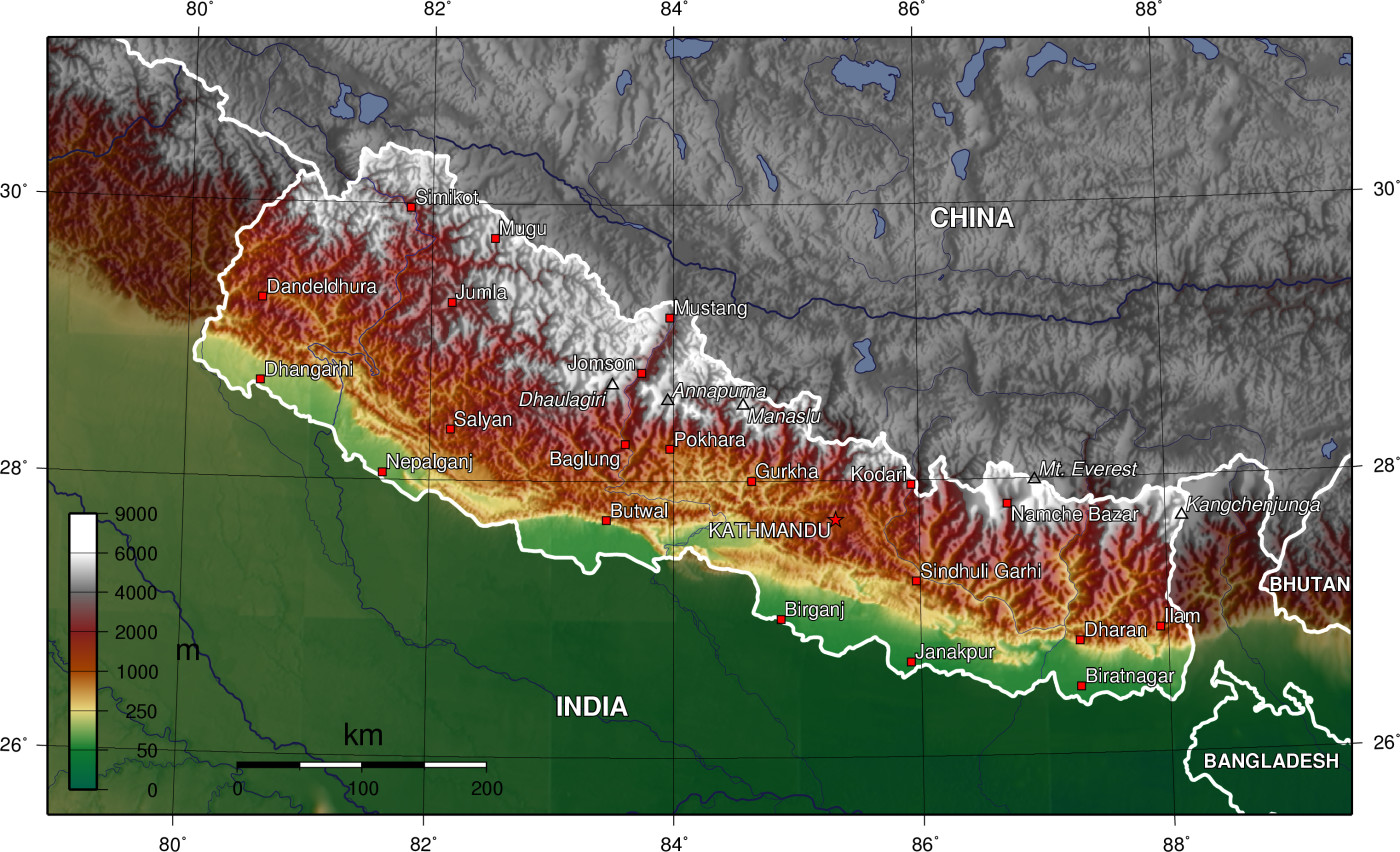
Topographic map of Nepal

The geology of Nepal is dominated by the Himalaya, the highest, youngest, and one of the most geologically active mountain ranges on Earth. Himalaya is a type locality for the study of on-going continent-continent collision tectonics. The Himalayan arc extends about 2,400 km (1,500 mi) from Nanga Parbat (8,138 m (26,699 ft)) by the Indus River in northern Pakistan eastward to Namche Barwa (7,756 m (25,446 ft)) by the gorge of the Tsangpo-Brahmaputra in eastern Tibet. About 800 km (500 mi) of this extent is in Nepal; the remainder includes Bhutan and parts of Pakistan, India, and China.

Since 55 Ma the Himalayan orogeny beginning with the collision of Indian subcontinent and Eurasia at the Paleocene/Eocene epoch, has thickened the Indian crust to its present thickness of 70 km (43 mi). The northwest tip of India after colliding with Asia seems to have met along the full length of the suture by about 40 Ma.

Immediately prior to the onset of the Indo-Asian collision, the northern boundary of the Indian shield was likely a thinned continental margin on which Proterozoic clastic sediments and the Cambrian ±Eocene Tethyan shelf sequence were deposited.

== Morpho-tectonic division of Nepal Himalaya ==
Heim and Gansser divided the rocks of the Himalaya into four tectonostratigraphic zones that are characterised by distinctive stratigraphy and physiography. From south to north, it can be divided into five latitudinal morpho-tectonic zones and these are :

1. The Gangetic plain (Terai)
2. The Sub Himalayan (Chure or Siwalik)
3. Lesser Himalayan (Mahabharat Mountain Range),
4. Greater Himalayan, and
5. Tibetan Himalayan zones (Tethys Himalaya).

=== Gangetic plain ===
The gangetic plain is also called the Terai which is a rich and fertile land in the southern parts of Nepal. It represents Holocene/Recent sedimentation belt where fluvial sedimentation is still in progress. This plain is less than 200 m above sea level and has thick (about 1500 m) alluvial deposit. The alluvial deposits mainly consists of boulders, gravel, sand, silt and clay. It is a foreland basin which consists of the sediments brought down from the northern part of Nepal. It is the Nepalese extension of the Indo-Gangetic Plains, which covers most of northern and eastern India, the most populous parts of Pakistan, and virtually all of Bangladesh. The Plains get their names from the rivers Ganges and Indus.

The alluvial plains of the Indo-Gangetic Basin evolved as a foreland basin in the southern part of the rising Himalaya, before breaking up along a series of steep faults known as the Himalayan Frontal Fault or the Main Frontal Thrust. It comprises several sub-basins and all of them are quite shallow towards the south, but rather deep in the northern sections.

=== Sub-Himalaya (Siwaliks) ===
The Sub-Himalayan Sequence borders the Indo-Gangetic Floodplain along the Himalayan Frontal Fault and is dominated by thick Late Tertiary mollassic deposits known as the Siwaliks that resulted from the accumulating fluvial deposits on the southern front of the evolving Himalaya. In Nepal, it extends throughout the country from east to west in the southern part. It is delineated by the Himalayan Frontal Thrust (HFT) and Main Boundary Thrust (MBT) in south and north respectively. The youngest sediments on the top are the conglomerates, and the sandstones and mudstones are dominant in the lower portions. The upward coarsening sequence of the sediments obviously exhibit the time-history in the evolution and growth of the Himalaya during the early Tertiary time.

The Sub Himalayan zone is the 10 to 25 km wide belt of Neogene Siwaliks (or Churia) group rocks forming the topographic front of the Himalaya. It rises from the fluvial plains of the active foreland basin, and this front generally mapped as the trace of the Main Frontal Thrust (MFT). The Siwaliks Group consists of upward-coarsening successions of fluvial mudstone, siltstone, sandstone, and conglomerate.

The Siwaliks Group in Nepal is composed of three units that are known as lower, middle and upper members. These units can be correlated with the Sub Himalaya of Pakistan and of northern India. Palaeocurrent and petrographic data from the sandstone and conglomerate indicate that these rocks were derived from the fold-thrust belt, and deposited within the flexural foredeep of the Himalayan foreland basin.

=== Lesser Himalaya ===
The Lesser Himalayas lies in between the Sub-Himalayas and Higher Himalayas separated by the Main Boundary Thrust (MBT) and the Main Central Thrust (MCT) respectively. The total width ranges from 60 to 80 km. The Lesser Himalayas is made up mostly of unfossiliferous sedimentary and metasedimentary rocks; such as shale, sandstone, conglomerate, slate, phyllite, schist, quartzite, limestone and dolomite. The rocks range in age from Precambrian to Miocene. The geology is complicated due to folding, faulting, and thrusting and are largely unfossiliferous. Tectonically, the entire Lesser Himalayas consists of two sequences of rocks: allochthonous, and autochthonous-para autochthonous units; with various nappes, klippes and tectonic windows.

The northernmost boundary of the Siwaliks Group is marked by the Main Boundary Thrust (MBT), over which the low-grade metasedimentary rocks of the Lesser Himalaya overlie. The Lesser Himalaya also called the Lower Himalaya, or the Midlands, is a thick (about 7 km) section of para-autochthonous crystalline rocks made up of low- to medium-grade rocks. These lower Proterozoic clastic rocks are subdivided into two groups. Argillo-arenaceous rocks dominate the lower half of the succession, whereas the upper half consists of both carbonate and siliciclastic rocks.

The Lesser Himalaya thrust over the Siwaliks along the MBT to the south is overlaid by the allochthonous thrust sheets of Kathmandu and HHC along the MCT. The Lesser Himalaya is folded into a vast post-metamorphic anticlinal structure known as the Kunchha-Gorkha anticlinorium. The southern flank of the anticlinorium is weakly metamorphosed, whereas the northern side is highly metamorphosed.

=== Main Central Thrust Zone ===
Heim and Gansser defined the MCT in Kumaon based on the difference in metamorphic grade between low to medium-grade rocks of the Lesser Himalaya and higher-grade rocks of the Greater Himalaya. However, the fault originally defined by Heim and Gansser is not the MCT, but a fault within Lesser Himalaya rocks; This misidentification symbolizes the challenge that workers have faced in locating the MCT. The metamorphic grade within the Lesser Himalaya increases towards the MCT and at higher structural levels.

In central Nepal, the metamorphic grade increases from low (chlorite + biotite) to medium (biotite + garnet + kyanite + staurolite) towards the MCT over a north–south distance. The highest-grade rocks (kyanite and sillimanite gneisses) are found within the MCT shear zone, i.e. upper Lesser Himalaya. Arita places two thrusts (MCT I and MCT II) on each side of the MCT shear zone.

=== Higher Himalaya ===
This zone extends from the MCT to the Tibetan-Tethys Zone and runs throughout the country. This zone consists of almost 10 km thick succession of the crystalline rocks, commonly called the Himal Group. This sequence can be divided into four main units, as Kyanite-Sillimanite gneiss, pyroxenic marble and gneiss, banded gneiss, and augen gneiss in the ascending order.

The Higher Himalayan sequence has been variously named. French workers used the term Dalle du Tibet (Tibetan Slab) for this unit. Hagen called them Khumbu Nappes, and Lumbasumba Nappes. Arita calls it the Himalayan Gneiss Group, and it lies above the MCT II, or the upper MCT.

The High Himalayan Crystalline units (HHC) are mainly composed of kyanite- to sillimanite-grade gneisses intruded by High Himalayan leucogranites at structurally higher levels. Throughout much of the range, the unit is divided into three formations. In central Nepal, the upper Formation III consists of augen orthogneisses, whereas the middle Formation II comprises calcsilicate gneisses and marbles, and the basal Formation I consists of kyanite- and sillimanite bearing metapelites, gneisses, and metagreywacke with abundant quartzite.

The gneiss of the Higher Himalayan zone (HHZ) is a thick continuous sequence of about 5 to 15 km. The northern part is marked by the North Himalayan Normal Fault (NHNF), which is also known as the South Tibetan Detachment system (STDS). At its base, it is bounded by the MCT. The protolith of the HHC is interpreted to be Late Proterozoic clastic sedimentary rocks deposited on the northern Indian margin.

=== Tibetan-Tethys ===
The Tibetan-Tethys Himalayas generally begins from the top of the Higher Himalayan Zone and extends to the north in Tibet. In Nepal these fossiliferous rocks are well developed in Thak Khola (Mustang), Manang and Dolpa area. This zone is about 40 km wide and composed of fossiliferous sedimentary rocks such as shale, sandstone and limestone etc.

The area north of the Annapurna and Manaslu ranges in central Nepal consists of metasediments that overlie the Higher Himalayan zone along the South Tibetan Detachment system. It has undergone very little metamorphism except at its base where it is close to the Higher Himalayan crystalline rocks. The thickness is currently presumed to be 7,400 m. The rocks of the Tibetan Tethys Series (TSS) consist of a thick and nearly continuous lower Paleozoic to lower Tertiary marine sedimentary succession. The rocks are considered to be deposited in a part of the Indian passive continental margin.

== See also ==
- 1934 Nepal–India earthquake
- April 2015 Nepal earthquake
- Geography of Nepal
- Geology of the Himalaya
- List of earthquakes in Nepal
- May 2015 Nepal earthquake
- Main Himalayan Thrust
