= Geology of the Himalayas =

Origins and structure of the Himalayan Mountain range

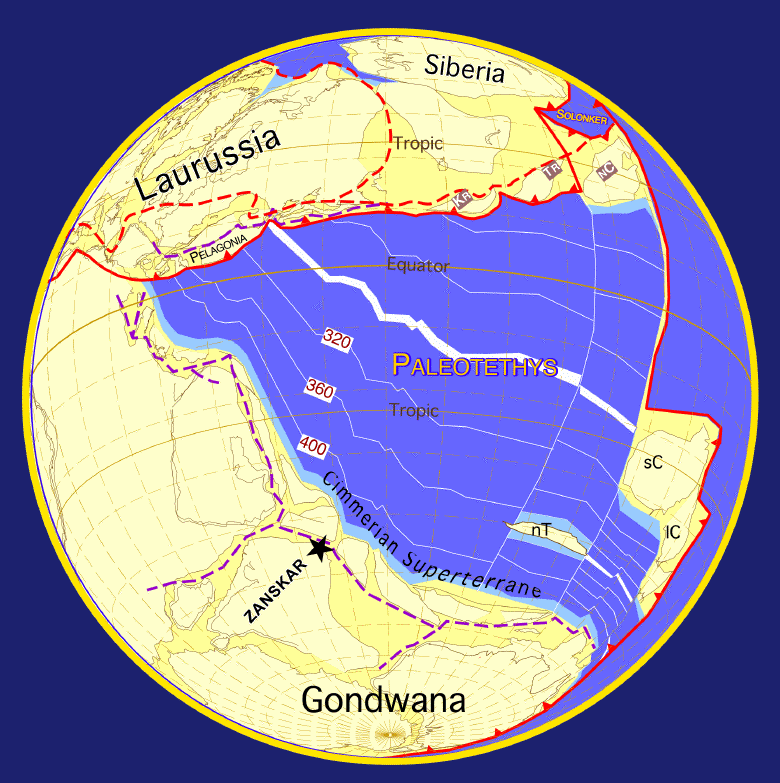
Fig 1: The Earth in the Early Permian (290 million years ago) when India was part of Gondwana and bordered to the north by the Cimmerian Superterrane. Paleogeographic reconstruction by Dèzes (1999), based on Stampfli & Borel (2002) and Patriat & Achache (1984). (Note: A more modern paleogeographic reconstruction of the Early Permian can be found at "Paleotethys". Université de Lausanne. Archived from the original on 8 June 2011..)

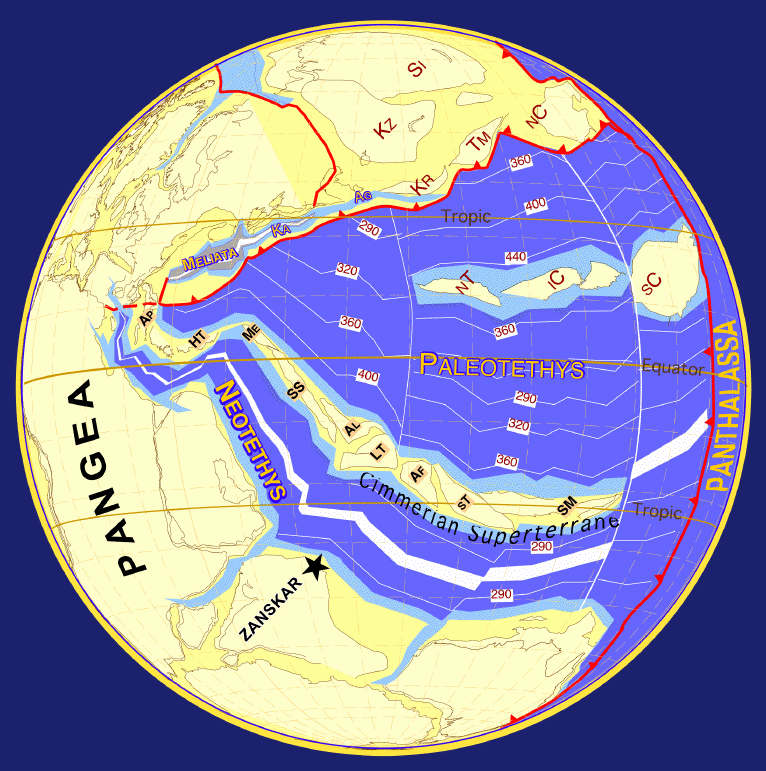
Fig 2: The Earth at the Permian-Triassic boundary. The opening of the Neotethys separates the Cimmeridian Superterrane from Gondwana. Based on Stampfli & Borel (2002) and Patriat & Achache (1984). (Note: A more modern paleogeographic reconstruction of the Permian-Triassic boundary, see "Neotethys". Université de Lausanne. Archived from the original on 19 January 2011..)

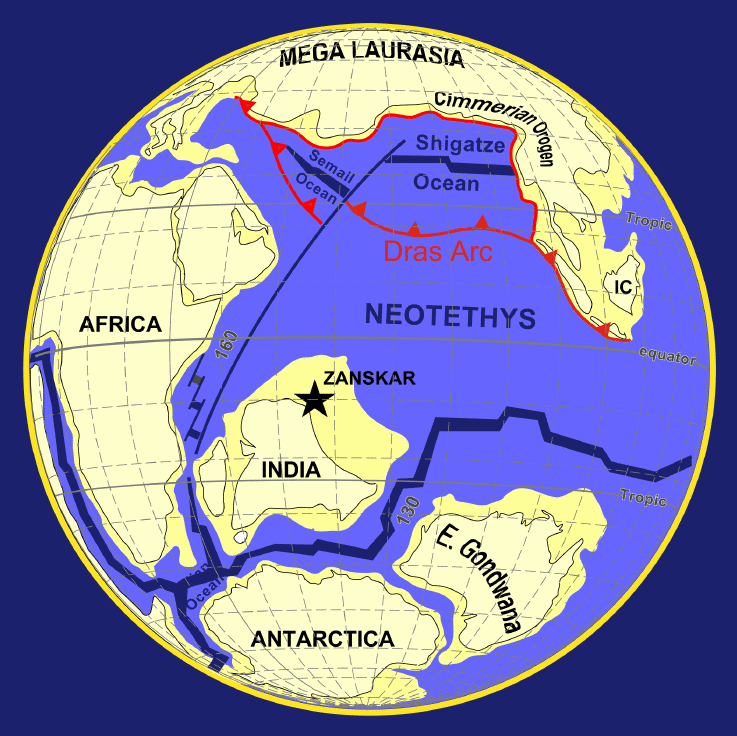
Fig 3: The earth in the Cretaceous. The Cimmeridian Superterrane has accreted to Mega Laurasia, the oceanic crust of the Neotethys is subducted to the north along the Dras volcanic arc, the Shigatze Ocean opens as a consequence of back-arc spreading, India is separated from Africa and E. Gondwana and the Indian Ocean opens. Paleogeographic reconstructions based by Dèzes (1999), on Stampfli & Borel (2002) and Patriat & Achache (1984).

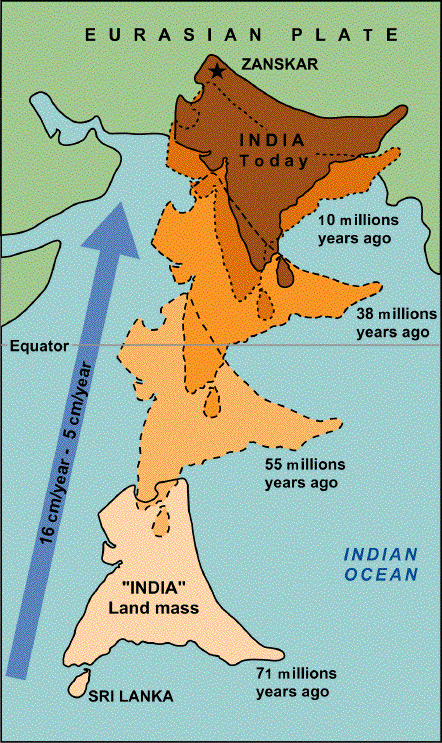
Fig 4: The northward drift of India from 71 Ma ago to present time. Note the simultaneous counter-clockwise rotation of India. Collision of the Indian continent with Eurasia occurred at about 55 million years ago. Source: www.usgs.org (modified)

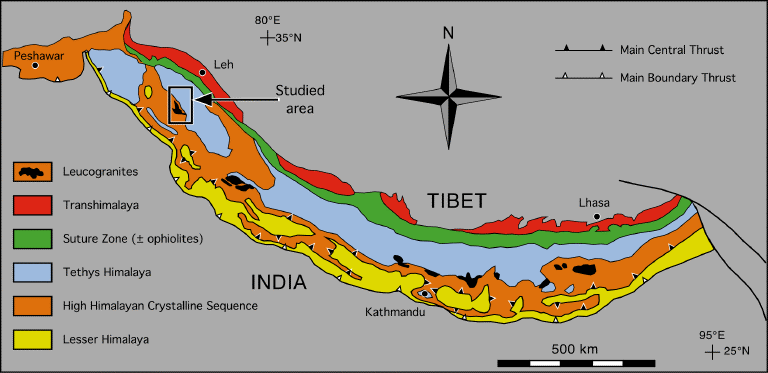
Fig 5: Geologic - Tectonic map of the Himalaya, modified after Le Fort & Cronin (1988). Green is the Indus-Yarlung suture zone.

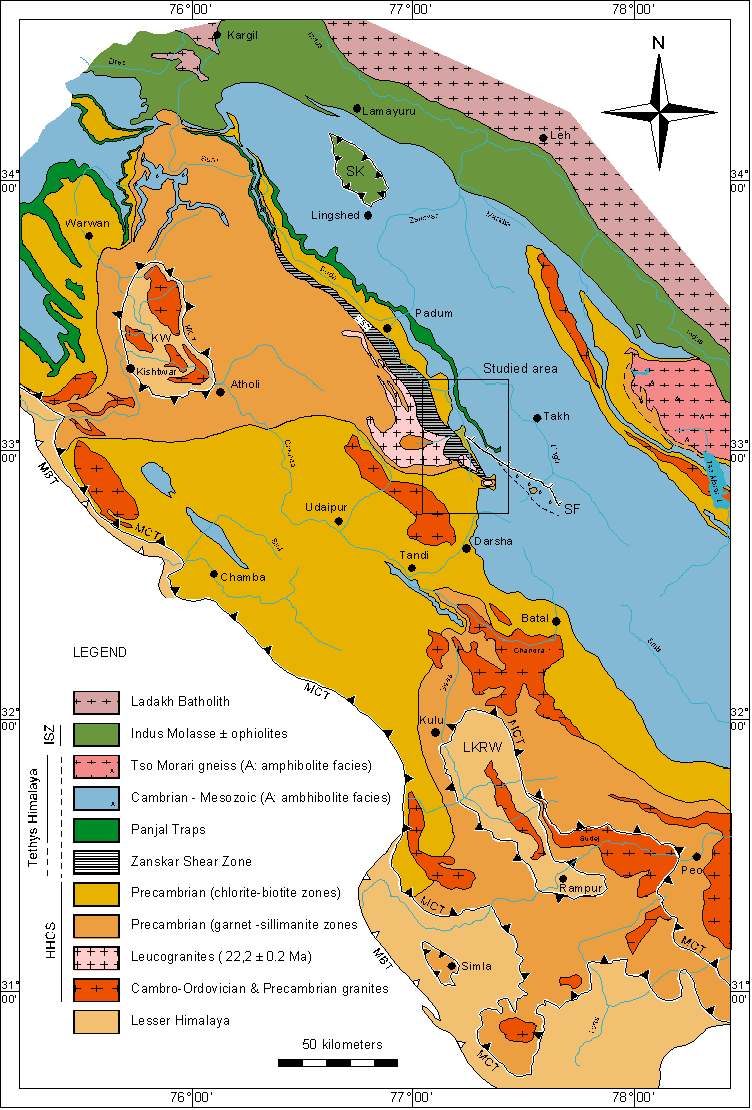
Fig 6: Geological Map of the NW Himalaya; for references, see image description or bibliography. HHCS: High Himalayan Cristalline Sequence; ISZ: Indus Suture Zone; KW: Kishtwar Window; LKRW: Larji-Kulu-Rampur Window; MBT: Main Boundary Thrust; MCT: Main Central Thrust; SF: Sarchu Fault; ZSZ: Zanskar Shear Zone.

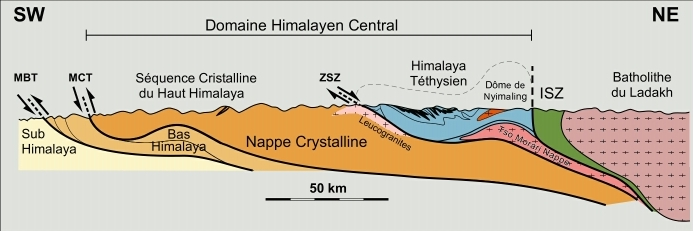
Fig 7: Simplified cross-section of the north-western Himalaya showing the main tectonic units and structural elements by Dèzes (1999).

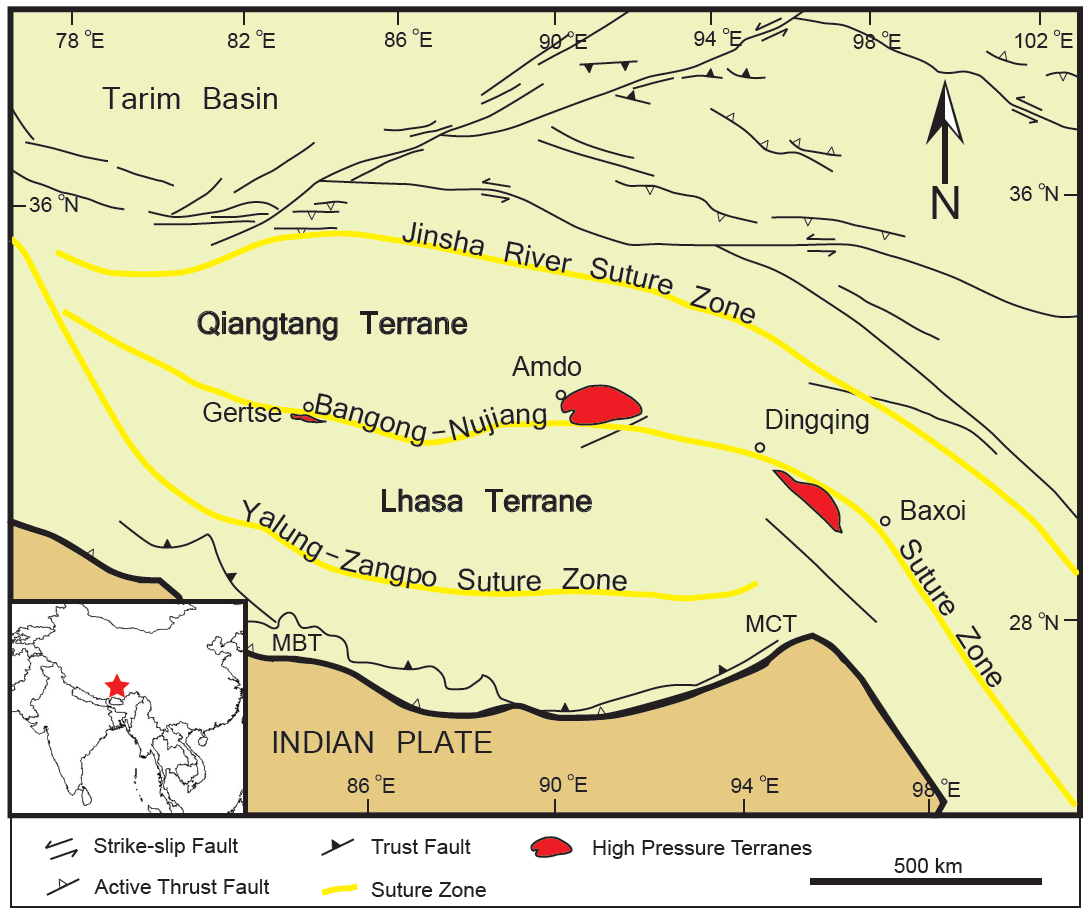
Fig 8: Indus-Yarlung suture zone separates Himalayas from the Transhimalayas. Lhasa Terrane (also called Karakoram-Lhasa Block/Terrane) lies within the Transhimalayas in its east side. Bangong-Nujiang Suture Zone separates Qiangtang Terrane from the Lahsa Terrane

The geology of the Himalayas is one of the most dramatic and visible creations of the immense mountain range formed by plate tectonic forces and sculpted by weathering and erosion. The Himalayas, which stretch over 2400 km between the Namcha Barwa syntaxis at the eastern end of the mountain range and the Nanga Parbat syntaxis at the western end, are the result of an ongoing orogeny — the collision of the continental crust of two tectonic plates, the Indian Plate thrusting into the Eurasian Plate. The Himalaya-Tibet region supplies fresh water for more than one-fifth of the world population, and accounts for a quarter of the global sedimentary budget. Topographically, the belt has many superlatives: the highest rate of uplift (nearly 10 mm/year at Nanga Parbat), the highest relief (8848 m at Mt. Everest Chomolangma), among the highest erosion rates at 2–12 mm/yr, the source of some of the greatest rivers and the highest concentration of glaciers outside of the polar regions.

From south to north the Himalaya (Himalaya orogen) is divided into 4 parallel tectonostratigraphic zones and 5 thrust faults which extend across the length of Himalaya orogen. Each zone, flanked by the thrust faults on its north and south, has stratigraphy (type of rocks and their layering) different from the adjacent zones. From south to north, the zones and the major faults separating them are the Main Frontal Thrust (MFT), Subhimalaya Zone (also called Sivalik), Main Boundary Thrust (MBT), Lesser Himalaya (further subdivided into the "Lesser Himalayan Sedimentary Zone (LHSZ) and the Lesser Himalayan Crystalline Nappes (LHCN)), Main Central thrust (MCT), Higher (or Greater) Himalayan crystallines (HHC), South Tibetan detachment system (STD), Tethys Himalaya (TH), and the Indus‐Tsangpo Suture Zone (ISZ). North of this lies the Transhimalaya in Tibet which is outside the Himalayas. The Himalayas border the Indo-Gangetic Plain to the south, Pamir Mountains to the west in Central Asia, and the Hengduan Mountains to the east on the China–Myanmar border.

From east to west the Himalayas are divided into 3 regions, Eastern Himalaya, Central Himalaya, and Western Himalaya, which collectively house several nations.

== Making of the Himalayas ==
During Late Precambrian and the Palaeozoic, the Indian subcontinent, bounded to the north by the Cimmerian Superterranes, was part of Gondwana and was separated from Eurasia by the Paleo-Tethys Ocean (Fig. 1). During that period, the northern part of India was affected by a late phase of the Pan-African orogeny which is marked by an unconformity between Ordovician continental conglomerates and the underlying Cambrian marine sediments. Numerous granitic intrusions dated at around 500 Ma are also attributed to this event.

In the Early Carboniferous, an early stage of rifting developed between the Indian subcontinent and the Cimmerian Superterranes. During the Early Permian, this rift developed into the Neotethys ocean (Fig. 2). From that time on, the Cimmerian Superterranes drifted away from Gondwana towards the north. Nowadays, Iran, Afghanistan and Tibet are partly made up of these terranes.

In the Norian (210 Ma), a major rifting episode split Gondwana in two parts. The Indian continent became part of East Gondwana, together with Australia and Antarctica. However, the separation of East and West Gondwana, together with the formation of oceanic crust, occurred later, in the Callovian (160-155 Ma). The Indian plate then broke off from Australia and Antarctica in the Early Cretaceous (130-125 Ma) with the opening of the "South Indian Ocean" (Fig. 3).

In the Late Cretaceous (84 Ma), the Indian plate began its very rapid northward drift covering a distance of about 6000 km, with the oceanic-oceanic subduction continuing until the final closure of the oceanic basin and the obduction of oceanic ophiolite onto India and the beginning of continent-continent tectonic interaction starting at about 65 Ma in the Central Himalaya. The change of the relative speed between the Indian and Asian plates from very fast (18-19.5 cm/yr) to fast (4.5 cm/yr) at about 55 Ma is circumstantial support for collision then. Since then there has been about 2500 km of crustal shortening and rotating of India by 45° counterclockwise in the Northwestern Himalaya to 10°-15° counterclockwise in North Central Nepal relative to Asia (Fig. 4).

While most of the oceanic crust was "simply" subducted below the Tibetan block during the northward motion of India, at least three major mechanisms have been put forward, either separately or jointly, to explain what happened, since collision, to the 2500 km of "missing continental crust".

- The first mechanism also calls upon the subduction of the Indian continental crust below Tibet.
- Second is the extrusion or escape tectonics mechanism (Molnar & Tapponnier 1975) which sees the Indian plate as an indenter that squeezed the Indochina block out of its way.
- The third proposed mechanism is that a large part (~1000 km (Dewey, Cande & Pitman 1989) or ~800 to ~1200 km) of the 2500 km of crustal shortening was accommodated by thrusting and folding of the sediments of the passive Indian margin together with the deformation of the Tibetan crust.

Even though it is more than reasonable to argue that this huge amount of crustal shortening most probably results from a combination of these three mechanisms, it is nevertheless the last mechanism which created the high topographic relief of the Himalaya.

The Himalayan tectonics result in long term deformation. This includes shortening across the Himalayas that range from 900 to 1,500 km. Said shortening is a product of the significant ongoing seismic activity. The continued convergence of the Indian plate with the Eurasian plate results in mega earthquakes. These seismic events can reach greater than MW 8 and result in intense damage to infrastructure. The mid-crustal ramp in the Himalayas is a key geologic feature in the history for both long-term and short-term seismic processes linked to deformation and shortening. Over the last 15 Ma, the ramp has gradually moved south due to duplexing, accretion, and tectonic undercutting.

The ongoing active collision of the Indian and Eurasian continental plates challenges one hypothesis for plate motion which relies on subduction.

== Major tectonic subdivisions of the Himalaya ==
One of the most striking aspects of the Himalayan orogen is the lateral continuity of its major tectonic elements. The Himalaya is classically divided into four tectonic units that can be followed for more than 2400 km along the belt (Fig. 5 and Fig. 7). (Note: The fourfold division of Himalayan units has been used since the work of Blanford & Medlicott (1879) and Heim & Gansser (1939).)

=== Sub-Himalayan (Churia Hills or Sivaliks) tectonic plate ===
The Sub-Himalayan tectonic plate is sometimes referred to as the Cis-Himalayan tectonic plate in the older literature. It forms the southern foothills of the Himalayan Range and is essentially composed of Miocene to Pleistocene molassic sediments derived from the erosion of the Himalaya. These molasse deposits, known as the "Murree and Sivaliks Formations", are internally folded and imbricated. The Sub-Himalayan Range is thrust along the Main Frontal Thrust over the Quaternary alluvium deposited by the rivers coming from the Himalaya (Ganges, Indus, Brahmaputra and others), which demonstrates that the Himalaya is still a very active orogen.

=== Lesser Himalaya (LH) tectonic plate ===
The Lesser Himalaya (LH) tectonic plate is mainly formed by Upper Proterozoic to lower Cambrian detrital sediments from the passive Indian margin intercalated with some granites and acid volcanics (1840 ±70 Ma). These sediments are thrust over the Sub-himalayan range along the Main Boundary Thrust (MBT). The Lesser Himalaya often appears in tectonic windows (Kishtwar or Larji-Kulu-Rampur windows) within the High Himalaya Crystalline Sequence.

=== Central Himalayan Domain, (CHD) or High Himalaya tectonic plate ===
The Central Himalayan Domain forms the backbone of the Himalayan orogen and encompasses the areas with the highest topographic relief (highest peaks). It is commonly separated into four zones.

==== High Himalayan Crystalline Sequence (HHCS) ====
Approximately 30 different names exist in the literature to describe this unit; the most frequently found equivalents are "Greater Himalayan Sequence", "Tibetan Slab" and "High Himalayan Crystalline". It is a 30-km-thick, medium- to high-grade metamorphic sequence of metasedimentary rocks which are intruded in many places by granites of Ordovician (c. 500 Ma) and early Miocene (c. 22 Ma) age. Although most of the metasediments forming the HHCS are of late Proterozoic to early Cambrian age, much younger metasediments can also be found in several areas, e.g. Mesozoic in the Tandi syncline of Nepal and Warwan Valley of Kistwar in Kashmir, Permian in the "Tschuldo slice", Ordovician to Carboniferous in the "Sarchu area" on Leh-Manali Highway. It is now generally accepted that the metasediments of the HHCS represent the metamorphic equivalents of the sedimentary series forming the base of the overlying "Tethys Himalaya". The HHCS forms a major nappe which is thrust over the Lesser Himalaya along the "Main Central Thrust" (MCT).

==== Tethys Himalaya (TH) ====
The Tethys Himalaya is an approximately 100-km-wide synclinorium formed by strongly folded and imbricated, weakly metamorphosed sedimentary series. Several nappes, termed the "North Himalayan Nappes", have also been described within this unit. An almost complete stratigraphic record ranging from the Upper Proterozoic to the Eocene is preserved within the sediments of the TH. Stratigraphic analysis of these sediments yields important indications on the geological history of the northern continental margin of the Indian sub-continent from its Gondwanian evolution to its continental collision with Eurasia. The transition between the generally low-grade sediments of the "Tethys Himalaya" and the underlying low- to high-grade rocks of the "High Himalayan Crystalline Sequence" is usually progressive. But in many places along the Himalayan belt, this transition zone is marked by a major structure, the "Central Himalayan Detachment System", also known as the "South Tibetan Detachment System" or "North Himalayan Normal Fault", which has indicators of both extension and compression. See ongoing geologic studies section below.

==== Nyimaling-Tso Morari Metamorphic Dome (NTMD) ====
"Nyimaling-Tso Morari Metamorphic Dome" in the Ladakh region, the "Tethys Himalaya synclinorium" passes gradually to the north in a large dome of greenschist to eclogitic metamorphic rocks. As with the HHCS, these metamorphic rocks represent the metamorphic equivalent of the sediments forming the base of the Tethys Himalaya. The "Precambrian Phe Formation" is also here intruded by several Ordovician (c. 480 Ma) granites.

==== Lamayuru and Markha Units (LMU) ====
The Lamayuru and Markha Units are formed by flyschs and olistholiths deposited in a turbiditic environment, on the northern part of the Indian continental slope and in the adjoining Neotethys basin. The age of these sediments ranges from Late Permian to Eocene.

=== Exhumation of Metamorphic Rocks ===
The metamorphic rocks of the Himalaya can be very useful in deciphering and coming up with models of tectonic relationships. According to Kohn (2014), the exhumation of metamorphic rocks can be explained by the Main Himalayan Thrust. Although the mechanism of emplacing higher grade metamorphic rocks on top of lower grade metamorphic rocks still strongly debated, Kohn believes that it is due to long periods of transportation of higher grade metamorphic rocks on the Main Himalayan Thrust. Essentially, the longer the higher grade rocks were spatially interacting with the thrust, the farther they were transported.

The exhumation of eclogite and granulite rocks can be explained by several different models. The first model includes slab tear where the lower plate tore off into the mantle leading to high amounts of rebound. The second model states that the rocks got to a certain point in subduction and then were forced back up through the channel they came down due to a space problem. The third model states that the thick continental crust of India further exacerbated the space problem and caused the corner flow of those rocks back up the channel. The fourth model includes the rocks being transported along the Main Himalayan Thrust.

Research on the Kumaon section of the Himalayas in 2011 showed the Higher Himalayan Crystalline (HHC) metamorphic series recorded at least four major stages of metamorphism: a pre-Indian/Asian collision stage, two differently-oriented stages during collision, and one of extension. Using apatite and zircon fission-track analysis, the researchers were also able to show that the ages of their samples did not change as one moved further north into the complex (from the main central thrust) even though samples were taken at different elevations. This implies a steady-state exhumation system where isotherms are parallel, so the distance rock travels as it is pushed upwards is uniform and thus, so is the speed of exhumation. The rate of erosion with respect to exhumation is thus also balanced.

=== Indus Suture Zone (ISZ) (or Yarlung-Tsangpo Suture Zone) tectonic plate ===
ISZ, also called Indus-Yarlung suture zone, Yarlung-Zangpo Suture Zone or Yarlung-Tsangpo Suture Zone, defines the zone of collision between the Indian Plate and the Ladakh Batholith (also Transhimalaya or Karakoram-Lhasa Block) to the north. This suture zone is formed by:

- Ophiolite Mélanges, composed of an intercalation of flysch and ophiolites from the Neotethys oceanic crust.

- Dras Volcanics, relicts of a Late Cretaceous to Late Jurassic volcanic island arc and consist of basalts, dacites, volcanoclastites, pillow lavas and minor radiolarian cherts

- Indus Molasse, a continental clastic rock sequence (with rare interbeds of marine saltwater sediments) comprising alluvial fan, braided stream and fluvio-lacustrine sediments derived mainly from the Ladakh batholith but also from the suture zone itself and the Tethys Himalaya. These molasses are post-collisional and thus Eocene to post-Eocene.

- Indus Suture Zone, representing the northern limit of the Himalaya. Further to the North is the so-called Transhimalaya, or more locally Ladakh Batholith, which corresponds essentially to an active margin of Andean type. Widespread volcanism in this volcanic arc was caused by the melting of the mantle at the base of the Tibetan bloc, triggered by the dehydration of the subducting Indian oceanic crust.

== Seismic activity ==
The modern day rate of convergence between the Indian and Eurasian plates is measured to be approximately 17 mm/yr. This convergence is accommodated through seismic activity in active fault zones. As a result, the Himalayan range is one of the most seismically active regions in the world. This region has experienced many high magnitude earthquakes in the last 100 years, including the 1905 Kangra Earthquake, 1975 Kinnaur Earthquake, 1991 Uttarkashi Earthquake, and the 1999 Chamoli Earthquake, all of which were recorded at magnitudes equal or greater than Mw 6.6.

A recent study (Parija et al, 2021) sought to quantify the Coulomb Stress Transfer in the Western Himalayas. Coulomb stress transfer is used to quantify how earthquakes release stress, identifying areas that are put under increased stress and those that have been unloaded. This study and those like it are important in understanding the current state of fault zones in the region, as well as their potential for rupture in the future.

== See also ==
Localized geology and geomorphology topics for various parts of the Himalaya are discussed on other pages:

- Geology of Nepal
- Zanskar is a subdistrict of the Kargil district, which lies in the eastern half of the Indian union territory of Ladakh.
- Indus River - the erosion at Nanga Parbat is causing rapid uplifting of lower crustal rocks
- Mount Everest
- Sutlej River - similar small scale erosion to the Indus
- Tibetan Plateau to the North (also discussed in Geography of Tibet)
- Paleotethys
- Karakoram fault system - major active fault system within the Himalaya
- Main Himalayan Thrust - the root thrust that underlies the Himalaya
