= 1999 Chamoli earthquake =

Severe earthquake in India

- Location within Uttarakhand Location within India
- UTC time: 1999-03-28 19:05:11
- ISC event: 1547491
- USGS-ANSS: ComCat
- Local date: 29 March 1999
- Local time: 00:35
- Magnitude: 6.6 M_{w}^{(ANSS)}
- Depth: 15 kilometres (9 mi)
- Epicenter: 30.512°N 79.403°E
- Type: Thrust
- Areas affected: India
- Max. intensity: MMI VIII (Severe)
- Casualties: Approximately 103 dead, over 394 injured

The 1999 Chamoli earthquake occurred on 29 March in the Chamoli district in the Indian state of Uttar Pradesh (now in Uttarakhand). Approximately 103 people died in the earthquake and over 394 others were injured.

== Cause ==
The Himalaya Range has been undergoing crustal shortening along the 2,400 km long northern edge of the Indian plate which resulted in the formation of several thrust faults including the Main Central Thrust (MCT), the Main Boundary Thrust (MBT) and the Main Frontal Thrust (MFT). The MCT consists of three sub-thrusts: MCT I, MCT II and MCT III. Many earthquakes have occurred along these thrust faults. It is thought that the Chamoli earthquake in 1999 was associated with these fault systems.

== Description ==
The earthquake was the strongest to hit the foothills of the Himalayas in more than ninety years. Apart from the Chamoli district, the quake also affected five other districts of Uttar Pradesh viz. Rudraprayag, Tehri Garhwal, Bageshwar, Uttarkashi and Pauri Garhwal (all are in Uttarakhand now). Among these, Chamoli and Rudraprayag were the most affected districts. Aftershocks continued and most of the aftershocks occurred in the east of Chamoli. Officials from Pakistan reported that the quake was also felt in Lahore and Gujranwala.

== Damage and casualties ==
Severe ground deformations resulted from the earthquake. Formation of ground fissures were reported from many areas. Landslides and changes in the groundwater flow were also reported. Well-developed ground cracks were seen in Gopeshwar, Chamoli and Bairagna. Cracks were observed in asphalt roads at several locations. Landslips cut off parts of Mandakini valley and Mandal valley and many major roads.

The death toll was 103. Several hundred people were injured and approximately 50,000 houses were damaged. Over 2,000 villages were affected by the earthquake. Electricity, water supply and communication were also severely affected by the earthquake especially in the Chamoli town, Gopeshwar and Okhimath region of Rudraprayag district. According to Mike Wooldridge, correspondent for the BBC News, Chamoli suffered most damage and almost all the houses and shops built on slopes in the lower part of the town were destroyed.

The bridge deck of a pedestrian suspension bridge situated near Bairagna developed lateral buckling and the cables of the bridge were loosened. Water pipelines in Chamoli and Gopeshwar towns were damaged affecting water supply due to landslides caused by the quake. The concrete-lined canals of the irrigation network in the affected region sustained some cracks.

In Delhi, many buildings sustained non-structural damage. According to Dr B.L. Wadhera, who filed a public interest litigation in the Delhi High Court, cracks developed in the Shastri Bhavan in Delhi which houses several Union Ministries. Damage occurred in several buildings in Dehradun also. A few old buildings of the Survey of India sustained collapse of gable masonry, and cracks developed along the junctions between the pitched roof and the masonry walls.

== Relief efforts ==
Rescue operations were hampered by landslides, loss of electrical power and the loss of communication links with Chamoli. Many road workers became involved to clear landslide debris from a 16 km stretch of road leading to the worst-affected area. Local people carried out search and rescue operations. Rescue efforts were led by the Indian Army and Paramilitary personnel were also called-in to aid. The army used helicopters to ferry in supplies. Food and other necessary supplies were air-dropped to villages which lacked motorable roads and where roads were damaged due to landslides. Locals organized a committee to make sure that those most affected receive food.

== See also ==
- Earthquake zones of India
- 1991 Uttarkashi earthquake
- List of earthquakes in 1999
- List of earthquakes in India
