= 1988 Mindoro earthquake =

Earthquake in the Philippines

- UTC time: 1988-06-19 20:19:52
- ISC event: 435768
- USGS-ANSS: ComCat
- Local date: June 20, 1988
- Local time: 4:19 a.m. (PST)
- Magnitude: 6.2 M_{w}
- Depth: 16.7 km (10.4 mi)
- Epicenter: 12.376°N 121.067°E
- Type: Strike-slip
- Areas affected: Mindoro, Philippines
- Max. intensity: MMI VI (Strong)
- Aftershocks: Few. Strongest was a 5.6 M_{w}
- Casualties: 2 fatalities, 4 injuries

On June 19, 1988, 20:19:52 UTC, an earthquake measuring 6.2 M_{w} struck the central Philippine island of Mindoro. The quake struck in the early morning at a depth of 16.7 km (10.4 mi). It had a maximum intensity of VI (Strong) on the Modified Mercalli intensity scale, and was located 1 km north-northeast of Bagong Sikat. The focal mechanism indicated strike-slip faulting. Most of the damage was in Mindoro where two people died and four were injured.

== Earthquake and aftershocks ==
The earthquake occurred at 4:19 AM (PST) in the southwest part of the island, measuring M_{w} 6.2. It was felt with a Mercalli intensity of VI (Strong). The event was caused by strike-slip movement on a local fault which then produced aftershocks. One of the strongest aftershocks recorded was a M_{w} 5.6 at 33 km depth. It occurred a day after the event. It reached an Intensity VI (Strong) on the Modified Mercalli intensity scale and was centered 4 km north-northwest of Santa Teresa (Southwest of Mindoro).

== Damage and casualties ==
The earthquake caused ground fissures near the coast of the town of San Jose, the town closest to the epicenter. The sea level rose at least five feet shortly after the quake that receded quickly. No buildings collapsed in the town, although many concrete walls were badly cracked. Damage was restricted to San Jose, as there were no reports of damage in other towns of the island. Two people were killed in the earthquake, one of them was a 63-year-old man who suffered a heart attack moments after. A woman and her three children were injured when they were hit by a falling wall.

== See also ==
- List of earthquakes in 1988
- List of earthquakes in the Philippines
- 1994 Mindoro earthquake
