= Kaiapit landslide =

Landslide in Papua New Guinea

On 6 September 1988, at 10:43am local time, a large part of an unnamed mountain of the Saruwaged Range in the Kaiapit district of Morobe Province, Papua New Guinea, collapsed, throwing 1,300-1,800 millions of cubic meters of rock onto the valley below. This resulted in the village of Marafau being entirely covered by the landslide, as well as the partial covering of the villages of Mitzing and Zumera, killing 74 people in the process.

== After the landslide ==
The three villages, now grouped together, form the 13th ward of the Umi-Atzero Rural LLG in the Markham District and house the internally displaced inhabitants of the former villages.
