= 1988 Tennant Creek earthquakes =

Sequence of strong quakes in Northern Territory

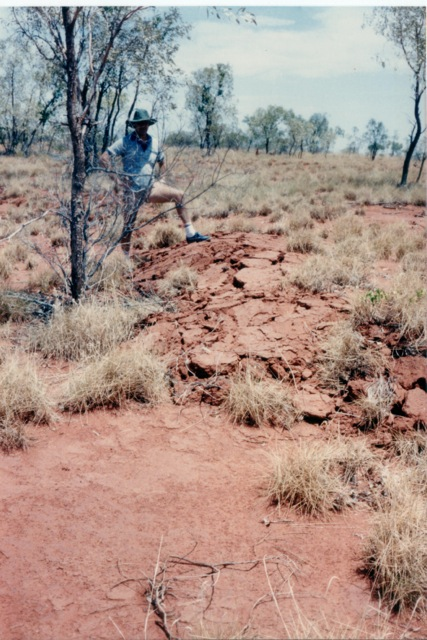
- Surface rupture caused by the earthquakes

- Location within Northern Territory Location within Australia
- UTC time: 1988-01-22 00:36:00
- 1988-01-22 03:57:28
- 1988-01-22 12:05:00
- ISC event: 448554
- 448569
- 448602
- USGS-ANSS: ComCat
- ComCat
- ComCat
- Local date: 22 January 1988
- Local time: 10:06
- 13:57
- 22:05
- Duration: 45 seconds (mainshock)
- Magnitude: 6.2 M_{w}
- 6.3 M_{w}
- 6.6 M_{w}
- Epicenter: 19.81°S 133.89°E
- Fault: Lake Surprise and Kunayungku faults
- Type: Thrust
- Areas affected: Northern Territory, Australia
- Total damage: $1 million
- Max. intensity: MMI IX (Violent)
- Aftershocks: More than 15,000, the biggest being mb 5.8
- Casualties: None

On 22 January 1988, a sequence of destructive earthquakes measuring 6.2, 6.3, and 6.6 struck southwest of Tennant Creek, Australia which was felt as far north as Darwin and in other regions of the country. The largest event of the sequence was the largest earthquake ever recorded in mainland Australia since records began in 1800. An intensity of IX (Violent) was observed. Despite the large magnitude of the earthquakes and a close proximity to a town, in a country where earthquakes of this size are not common, damages were limited. Thousands of aftershocks were reported across the Northern Territory.

== Tectonic setting ==
The continent of Australia borders some very seismically active regions, such as the boundary between the Pacific and the Australian plate where both plates collide, which runs from the island of New Guinea all the way to New Zealand. On the south and west sides of it are moderately active mid-ocean ridges which run through the Indian Ocean. However, the continent does not border these and is intraplate therefore occurrences of large earthquakes are rather rare. Despite the low seismicity, most large earthquakes which occur within Australia are scientifically significant. A few earthquakes of magnitude 5 occur yearly on average, and smaller, local earthquakes can occur daily and be detected by seismograms.

These big earthquakes near Tennant Creek occurred in the Proterozoic North Australian Craton, approximately 1500 km further south than the nearest plate boundary, therefore these events are referred to as intraplate earthquakes. The area where the quakes struck had no history of any earthquake before 1986 compared to the other seismic zones that have had bigger quakes which were seismically active beforehand.

The Tennant Creek fault zone which includes the Kunayungku and Lake Surprise faults which were ruptured, is located on the border between a Palaeozoic basin and an early Proterozoic Tennant Creek inlier which is surrounded by younger rocks. Both of these areas are a part of the North Australian Craton, which has formed a single stationary block of crust for 1,700 million years. The inlier is a basement of another bigger feature and consists of a group made up of sedimentary and metasedimentary rocks which is the Warramunga group which is intruded by older granite. Cambrian sedimentary platform sequences of the Palaeozoic Wiso Basin overlaps the Tennant Creek inlier on the western side near the fault scarps located in the region forming an extensive transition zone.

The focal depths of the Tennant Creek sequence ranged from 3.5 to 6.5 km, which is deeper than the thickness of the Cambrian platform near the epicenter. This proves that rather than the basin sedimentary, the Proterozoic basement controlled the nucleation of rupture.

== Earthquakes ==
The sequence created two scarps on the faults; the Lake Surprise scarp on the southern side in a boomerang shape looked from bird's eye and the Kunayungku scarp on the northern side which is shorter than Lake Surprise. On the west-northwest trending scarps, the Lake Surprise scarp was lifted as much as 2 meters compared to the northern one and a trench across the southern LS (Lake Surprise) scarp revealed a thrust plane that was dipping 20 to 30 degrees. No scarp was found when the pipelines that got damage were being surveyed. Other articles describe the aftershock zones as dipping towards the southwest at 40 to 50 degrees from the west-northwest trending ruptures. The east-northeast trending Western LS scarp did display a left lateral strike-slip motion but dip-slip was the dominant characteristic. The slip on the Western LS fault from observations in the area was thought to be facing northward, opposite to that observed on the scarps trending west-northwest. It is interpreted that the preliminary epicenters of the aftershocks are displaying a northwest dip for the Western LS fault which concludes that it is a thrust fault which also proves, along with focal mechanisms inferred from waveform data, that the focal mechanism of the 3 main shocks are thrust, oblique thrust and thrust in order.

=== Aftershocks ===
In the following year after the sequence, more than 15,000 aftershocks were recorded by the nearby Warramunga seismic array, with some aftershocks exceeding the magnitude 5 mark. The aftershocks include a 5.8 which occurred 8 hours after the biggest and last mainshock, a 5.5 occurring a week after and a 5.2 occurring later in the year at September 30.

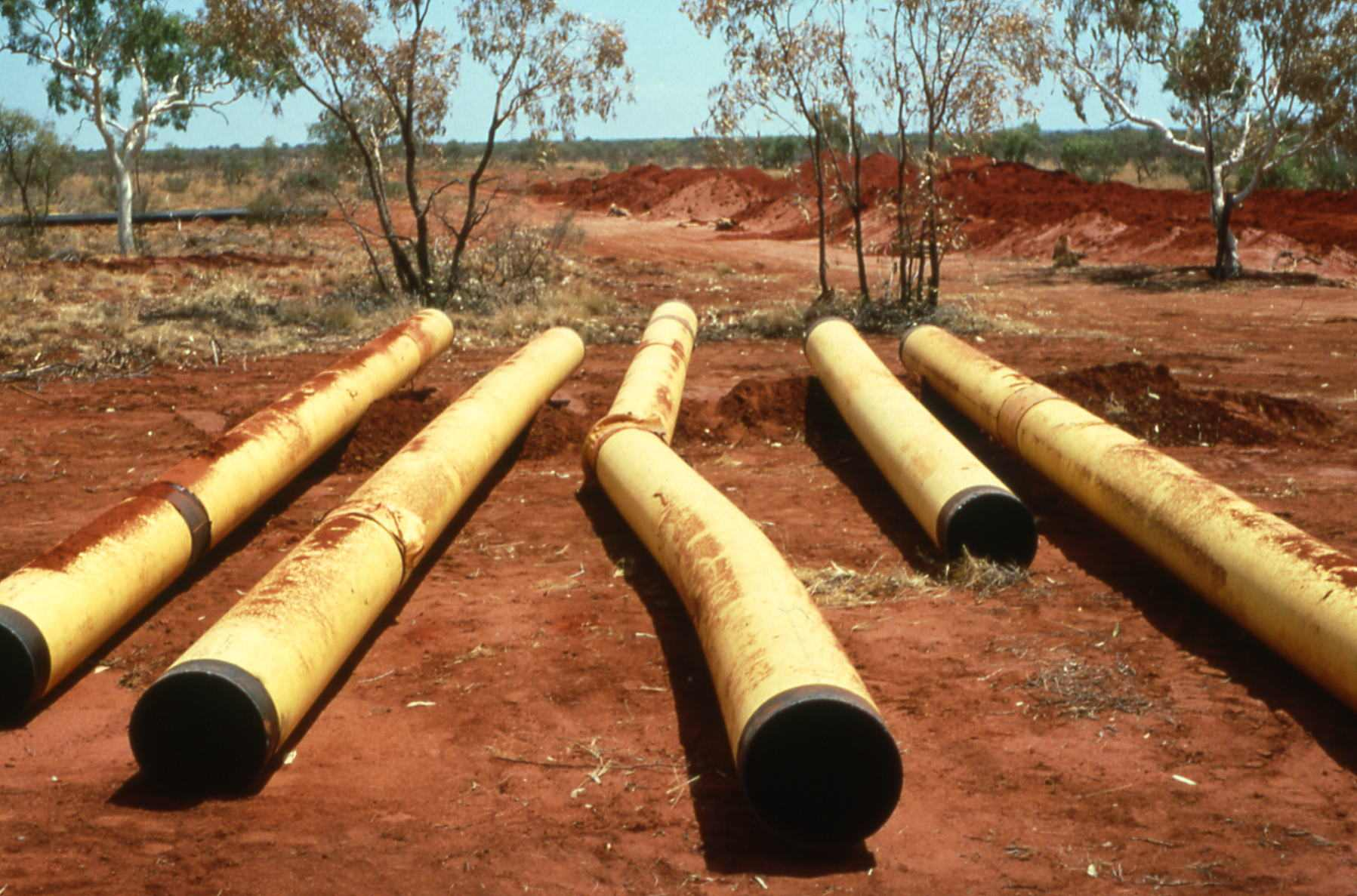
Crimped pipeline following the sequence

== Impacts ==
As a result of the events, lengthy surface ruptures measuring up to 32 km were observed along the faults.

Pipelines were heavily damaged as a result of the surface ruptures. Tennant Creek's hospital was seriously damaged. A few other homes were lightly damaged. No injuries or deaths were reported and US$1 million of damage was caused.

== Gallery ==
Images from the Gavin Carpenter Collection on Wikimedia Commons, all images taken immediately after the initial quakes:

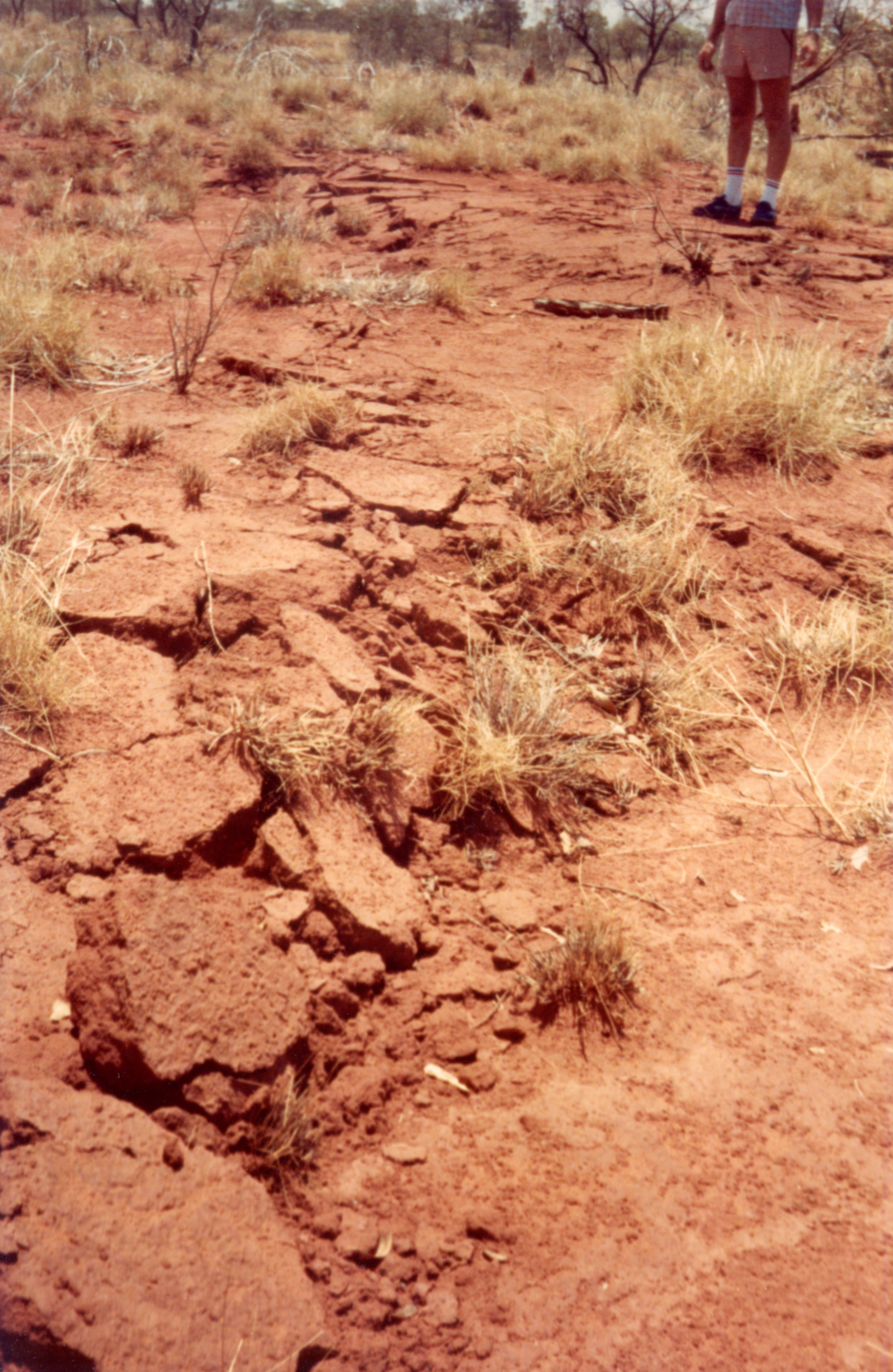
Impacts of the earthquake

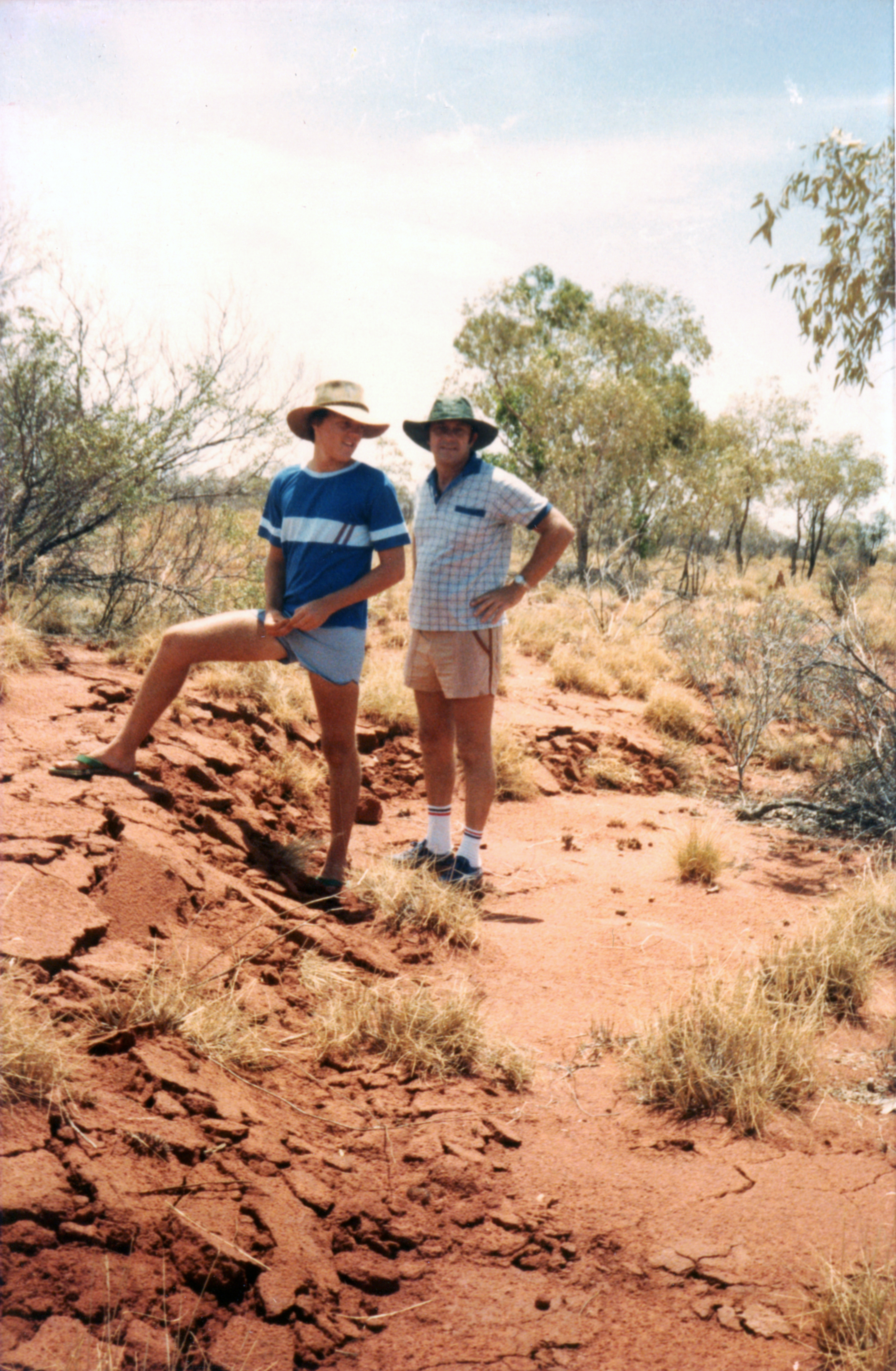
Mathew and Gavin Carpenter looking at the impact

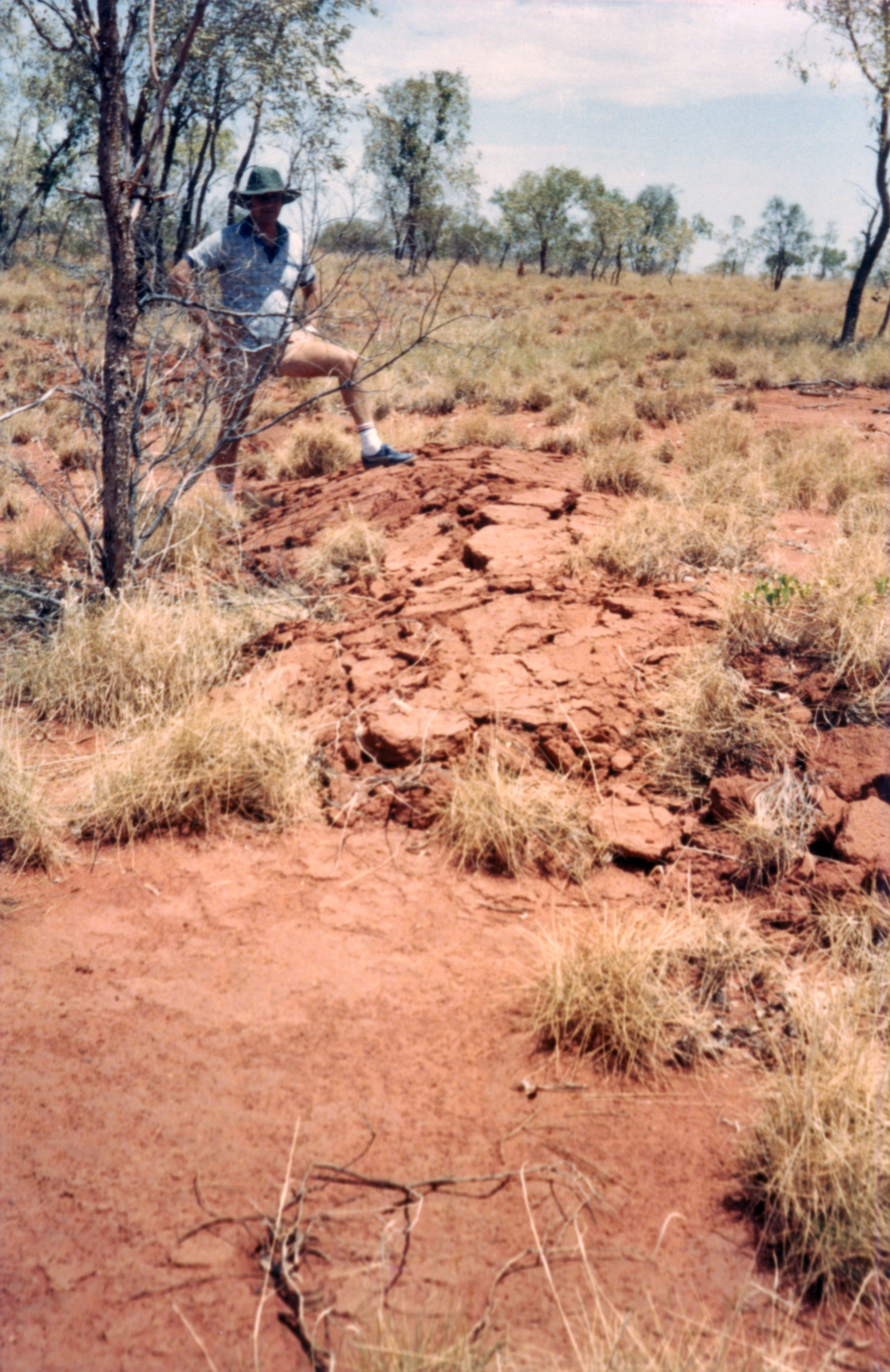
Gavin Carpenter looking at the disturbed earth

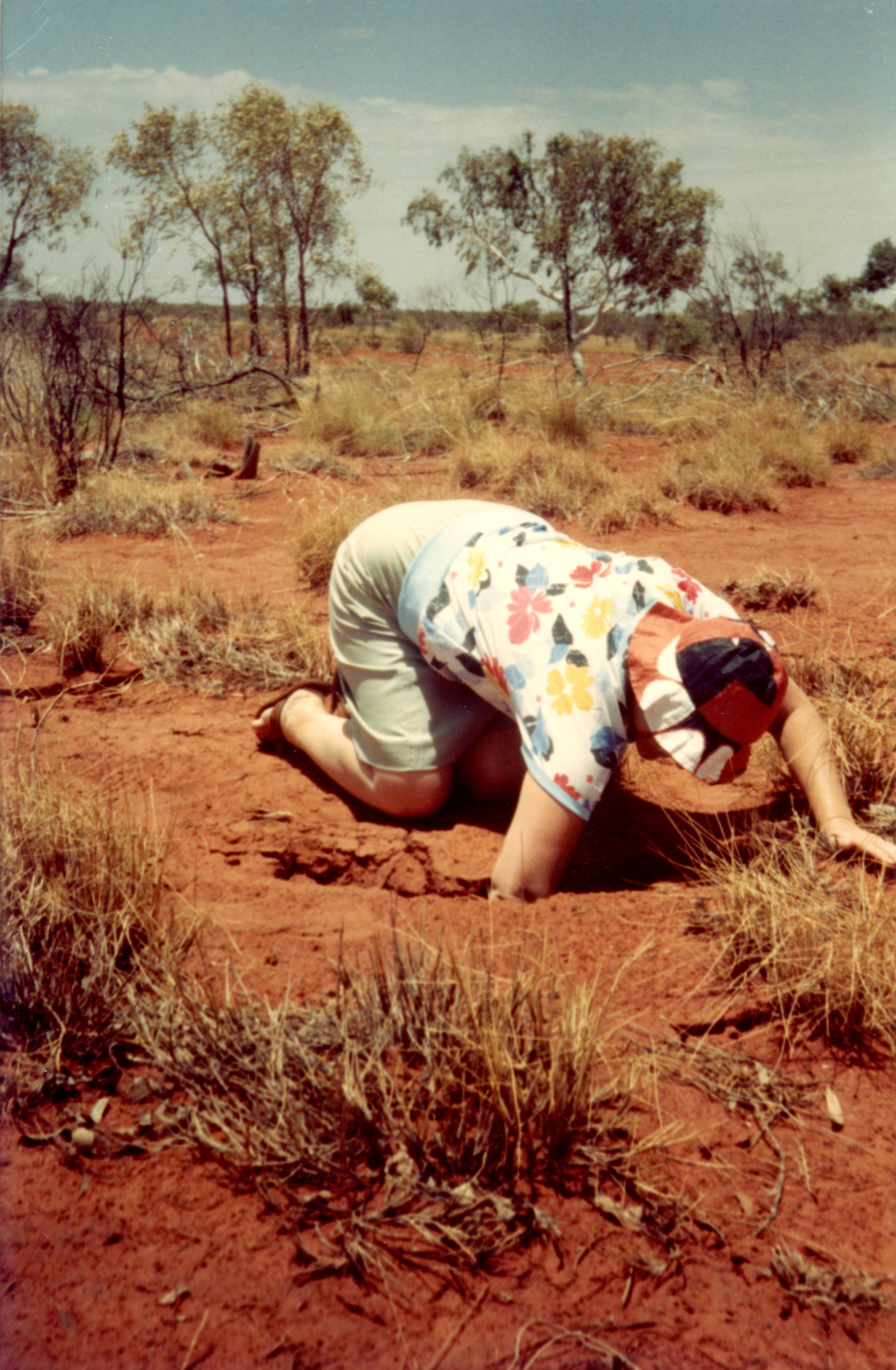
Joan Carpenter with her hand in the earth

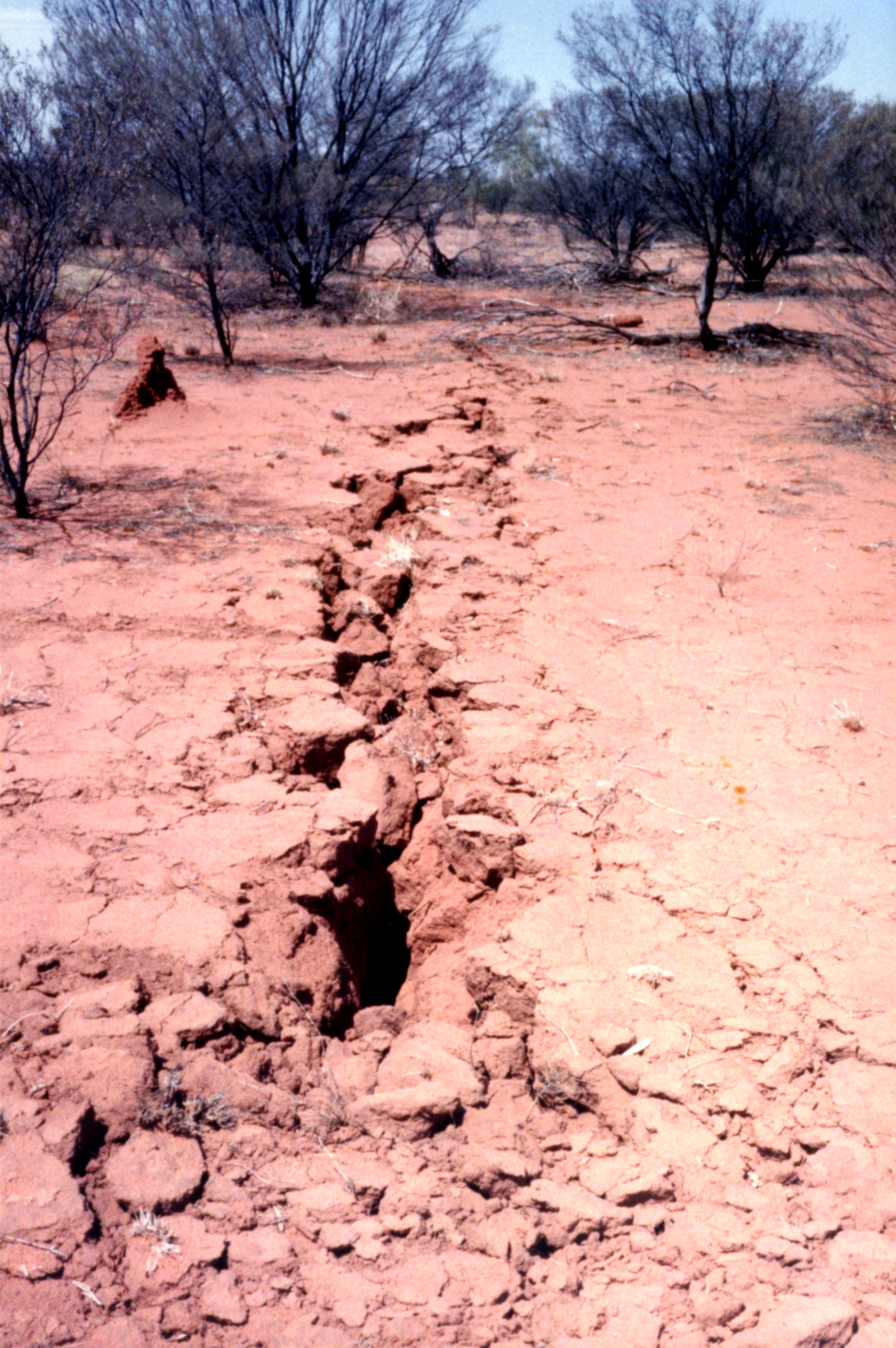
Some of the disturbance

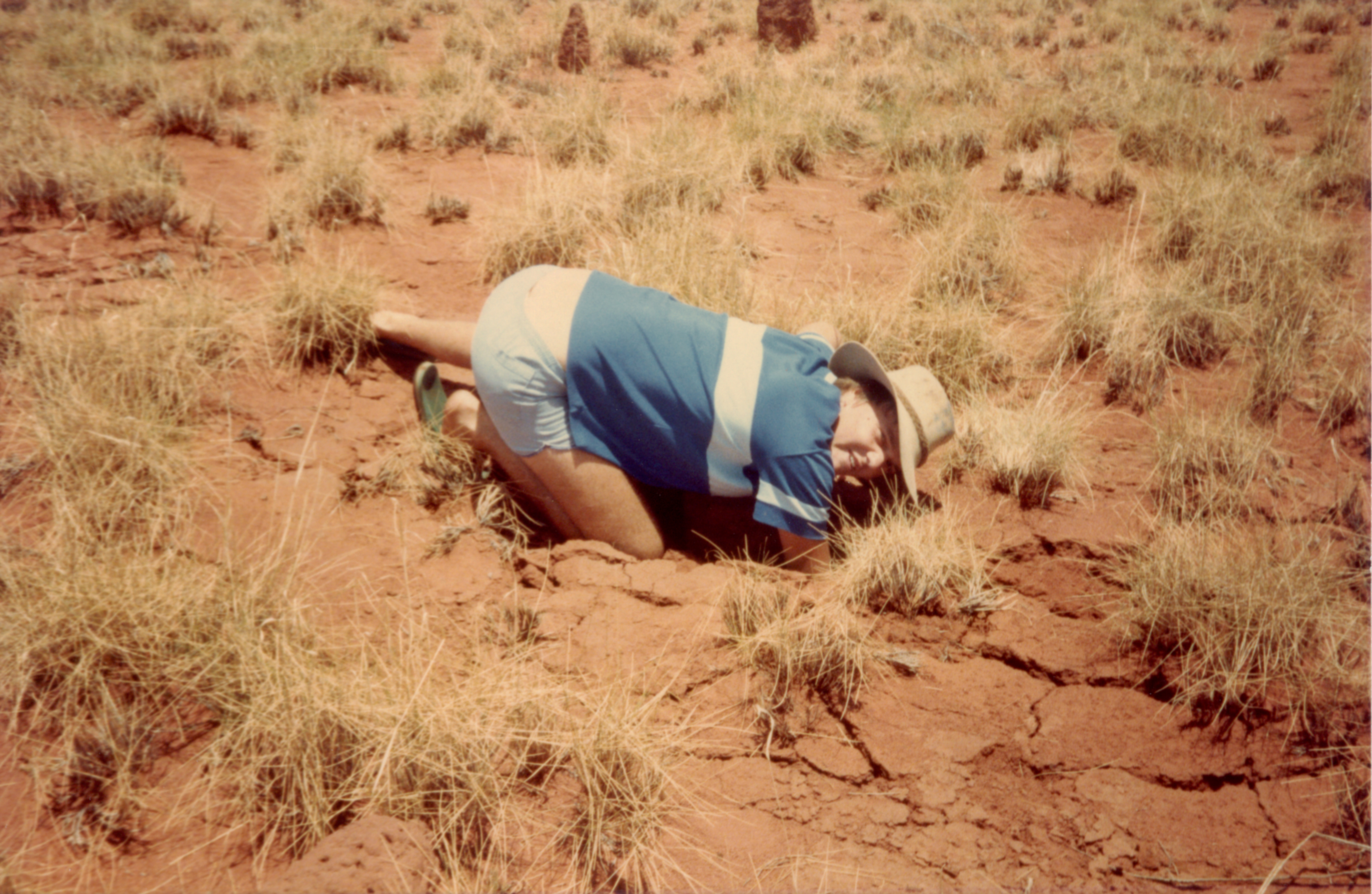
Matthew Carpenter examining to earth

== See also ==
- List of earthquakes in 1988
- List of earthquakes in Australia
- Earthquakes in Western Australia
