= Main Boundary Thrust =

Geological fault in the Himalayas

- Main Boundary Fault
- Location: Himalayas
- Country: India, Nepal, Pakistan, Bhutan

Characteristics
- Range: Himalayan Mountains
- Length: 2,400 km (1,500 mi)

Tectonics
- Type: Thrust (formerly), Normal (present)
- Age: Miocene-Holocene
- Orogeny: Himalayan

The Main Boundary Thrust (MBT), also known as the Main Boundary Fault, is a discontinuous series of seismic faults in the Himalayas which form the structural boundary between the Outer Himalayas and Lower Himalayan Range. The MBT is itself part of a series of thrusts which helped to accommodate the deformation when the Indian Plate collided with the Eurasian Plate in the Cenozoic. The MBT fault system began forming in the Miocene. The MBT consists of multiple segments, and is composed from west to east of the Murree and Drang thrust faults, the Krol thrust fault, the Surkhet-Ghorahi thrust fault, the Kathmandu thrust, and the Gondwana/Garu thrust. Despite originating as a thrust fault in the collision of India and Eurasia, the MBT system has reactivated as a normal faulting system.

== Tectonic setting ==
The MBT was formed as a result of the collision of the Indian continent with Asia. It developed to relieve stresses from the compression of the continental collision. When the MBT initially formed around 10-25 million years ago, it was a system of thrust faults which accommodated stresses from the compression of the continental collision which led to Himalayan uplift. The Main Himalayan Thrust is the root Décollement structure, and results in similar fault system splays such as the Main Himalayan Thrust, Main Central Thrust, and the South Tibetan Detachment. These faults accommodated stresses parallel to the MBT and helped the Himalayan mountains grow. Each of these faults served as the primary reliever of strain in the Himalayan Orogeny until being abandoned in a successive chain of intracontinental thrust faults. Currently, the Main Frontal Thrust is the main thrust fault in the system.

== Segments ==
The Main Boundary Thrust consists of multiple segments spanning 2,400 km (1,500 mi) in the Himalayas.

=== Murree/Drang thrust ===
The Murree fault is a thrust fault which lies in Kashmir. To its southeast, the Drang thrust continues as an extension of the Murree thrust in Himachal.

=== Krol thrust ===
To the southeast of the Murree and Drang faults, the Krol thrust is the main strand of the MBT and has "caused great shattering, inversion and imbricate thrusting".

=== Surkhet-Ghorahi fault ===
The Surkhet-Ghorahi thrust fault is a northwest trending fault in Central Nepal. It stretches from Surkhet to Ghorahi in over an extent of 90–120 km (56–75 mi). At the western bank of the Bheri River, the fault slips at a rate of 0.75 mm (0.030 in)/yr. The fault shows vertical fault scarp of 30 m (98 ft).

=== Kathmandu thrust ===
The Kathmandu thrust runs from east of the Surkhet-Ghorahi fault near Kathmandu to west of Thimphu.

=== Gondwana/Garu thrust ===
The Gondwana thrust fault system runs from west of Thimphu passing through Bhutan before terminating in West Kameng. In the east it is termed the Garu thrust, though it is a part of the Gondwana thrust.

== Modern reactivation ==
After acting as a thrust fault initially, the Surkhet-Ghorahi may have reactivated as a normal fault—moving the opposite direction of a thrust fault.
