= South Tibetan Detachment =

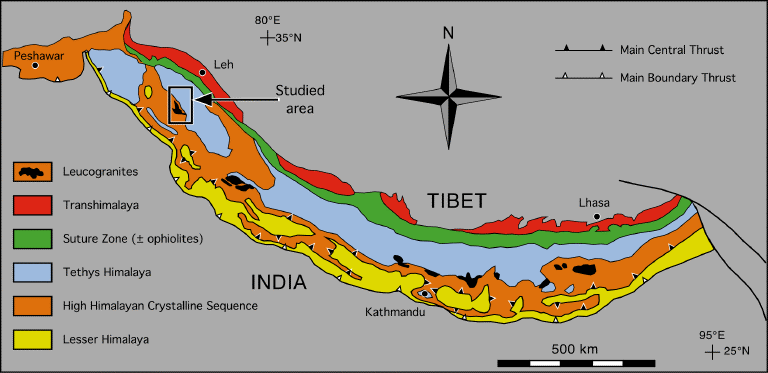
Figure 1: Geology of the Himalaya: Lesser Himalayan Sequence (yellow), Greater Himalayan Crystalline complex (orange), Tethyan Himalayan Sequence (blue)

The South Tibetan Detachment is one of the major faults in the Himalaya Mountains.

== Background ==
Understanding the formation of the Himalayan mountains has been a goal of structural geologists for a long time. Many of the problems and disagreements that geologists have with each other concerning the Himalayan orogeny involve the relationship between the observed geometry, or structures, with the various rock units (different types of rock). There are three primary rock units present in the Himalaya: the Lesser Himalayan Sequence (LHS; mainly low-grade Proterozoic metasediments, yellow in map), the Greater Himalayan Crystalline complex (GHC; largely high-grade paragneisses and migmatite, orange in map), and the Tethyan Himalayan Sequence (THS; dominantly low-grade late Proterozoic to Eocene shelf sediments; blue in map) More information about these rock units can be found by reading about the geology of Nepal. Because the Himalaya form on the leading edge of a collisional tectonic event, it stands to reason that many structural features will form in this area. The three main rock units: the LHS, GHC, and THS all have a hotly debated relationship with each other involving two main fault lines. One is the Main Central Thrust (MCT), and the other is the South Tibetan Detachment (STD). Tectonics geologists agree that the GHC, between the LHS and the THS, is between these two faults and is somehow being moved towards the surface and being exposed today. The South Tibetan Detachment is often interpreted as a low angle normal fault and can also represent extension. However, there are new interpretations about old observations that support the idea that the STD can also be a north-directed thrust fault.

== Geometry and structure ==
The main problem that the South Tibetan detachment is expected to help resolve is the method of emplacement of the GHC between the LHS and THS within the Himalaya. There are three models that help explain this emplacement: wedge extrusion, channel flow, and tectonic wedging. The wedge extrusion and channel flow models work under the assumption that the STD is a low angle normal fault, while the tectonic wedge model works as if the STD is a thrust fault.

Figure 2: Wedge extrusion model.

Figure 3: Channel flow model.

Figure 4: Tectonic wedging model.

== Importance ==
The Asia-India collision is one of the most interesting tectonic events of the last 100 million years, and the Himalaya play a critical role as a laboratory to many people studying tectonic processes. The Himalaya offers many opportunities to study all factors that go into mountain building such as continental collisions, erosion, and even climatic changes. In order to understand the structural complexity of the Himalaya orogen, understanding the South Tibet detachment is critical to figuring out the exact time and processes involved in the emplacement of rock units there.

=== IUGS geological heritage site ===
In respect of it being 'the place where the highest regional scale low-angle normal fault of the Earth can be directly observed', the International Union of Geological Sciences (IUGS) included 'The South Tibetan Detachment System in the Rongbuk Valley' in its assemblage of 100 'geological heritage sites' around the world in a listing published in October 2022. The organisation defines an IUGS Geological Heritage Site as 'a key place with geological elements and/or processes of international scientific relevance, used as a reference, and/or with a substantial contribution to the development of geological sciences through history.'
