= Main Central Thrust =

The Main Central Thrust is a major geological fault where the Indian plate has pushed under the Eurasian plate along the Himalaya. The fault slopes down to the north and is exposed on the surface in a NW-SE direction (strike). It is a thrust fault that continues along 2900 km of the Himalaya mountain belt.

The generally accepted definition of the Main Central Thrust is that it is a ductile shear zone along which the High-grade Great Himalayan Crystalline complex was placed above the low-grade to unmetamorphosed Lesser Himalayan Sequence. However, this definition is not perfect because of many difficulties and complications defining the Main Central Thrust.

Many geologists have researched the Main Central Thrust using various different criteria such as lithology, metamorphic isograd, geochronology, geochemistry, and strain magnitude. None of these are reliable if used independently. Furthermore, there is uncertainty because of the differences along-strike in the active ages of the Main Central Thrust. It was not all formed at the same time.

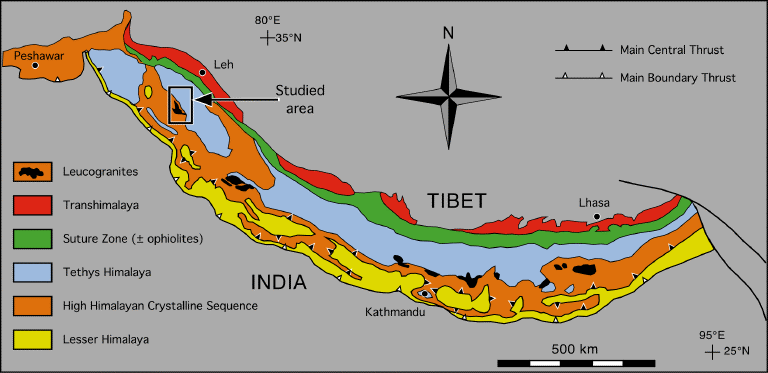
Figure 1. Simplified geological map of Himalaya. The Main Central Thrust is indicated by solid line and triangles.

== Geologic background ==
The Himalayan mountain belt was produced by the collision of the Indian plate and the Eurasian plate. It is structurally dominated by three north-dipping, fault-bound geological units stacked on each other. The major faults are South Tibetan Detachment, the Main Central Thrust, the Main Boundary Thrust and the Main Frontal Thrust. These units (figure 1), from south to north, are:

1. the Lesser Himalayan Sequence, which is mainly composed of low-grade Proterozoic metasediments to unmetamorphosed rocks, fringed by the Main Boundary Thrust and the Main Central Thrust;
2. the Greater Himalayan Crystalline complex, which is mainly composed by high-grade gneiss and migmatite, fringed below by the Main Central Thrust and the South Tibetan Detachment; and
3. the Tethyan Himalayan Sequence, mainly composed by Proterozoic to Eocene sediments, deformed in a Paleogene fold-thrust belt, fringed below by the South Tibetan Detachment.

=== Kinematic models ===
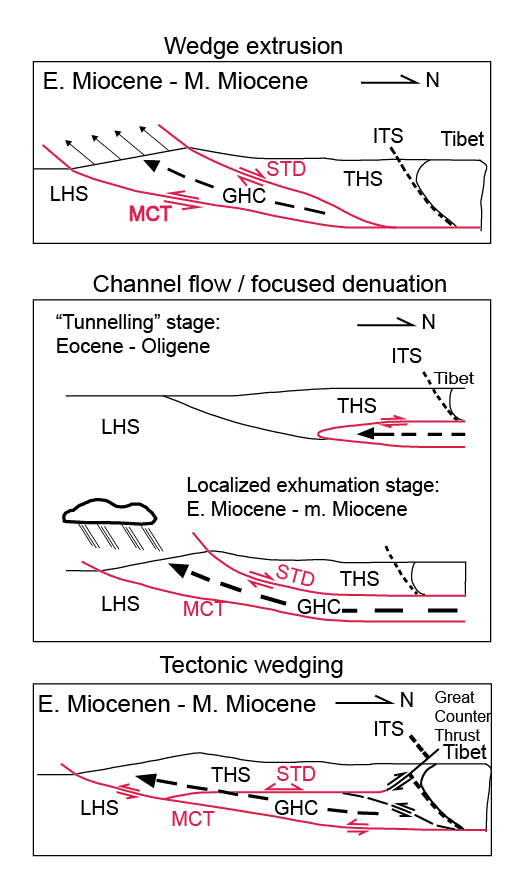
Figure 2. Kinematics models of Himalayan orogen (modified from Webb et al., 2011) showing three models of how the Greater Himalayan Crystalline complex was placed over the Lesser Himalayan Sequence. LHS: the Lesser Himalayan Sequence; GHC: the Greater Himalayan Crystalline complex; THS: the Tethyan Himalayan Sequence; MCT: the Main Central Thrust; STD: the South Tibetan Detachment; ITS: Indus-Tsangpo suture zone.

Knowledge of the kinematics of the Himalayan fault system is not as ideal as it has long been debated. To help understand the structural position the Main Central Thrust and role it played in the tectonic evolution of Himalaya, there are three general kinematic models: extrusion model, channel flow model, tectonic wedging model. for the fault system of Himalaya shown in shown in figure 2.

== Various definitions of the Main Central Thrust ==
=== Difficulties in understanding ===
Although the general definition of the Main Central Thrust has been given, it is not enough due to the complication and difficulties in defining the Main Central Thrust.

For long, many researchers have defined the Main Central Thrust by different criteria, including by lithology that differs between the hanging wall and the footwall, by metamorphic grade changes from the hanging wall to the footwall, by the different Uranium-Lead (U-Pb) detrital zircon ages, by the different Neodymium isotope compositions, by different strain, etc. Some of these criteria have also been combined. However, none of these criteria are reliable if they are used by themselves. Meanwhile, these criteria are not all be satisfied together. The dominant problems are:

- lithology and stratigraphy have not been completely investigated and understood;
- metamorphic grades across the Main Central Thrust shear zone are continuously changing, thus any one particular isograd is not reliable for determining the location of the Main Central Thrust;
- strain magnitude cannot be determined as most of the fabrics of the Main Central Thrust that resulted from shearing, have disappeared because of strong heating and deformation; and that
- some geologists do not believe that the whole shear surface was active at the same time because they think that the Main Central Thrust ductile shear zone is caused by finite strain deformation.

=== Definitions based on various criteria ===
Despite the difficulties in defining the Main Central Thrust, the following definitions of the Main Central Thrust have been made based on various criteria:

By lithologic criteria, the Main Central Thrust is defined as the boundary between quartzite and phyllite, from the Lesser Himalayan Sequence; and the orthogneiss biotite-rich schist, which belongs to the Greater Himalayan Crystalline complex.

By metamorphic isograd, the Main Central Thrust follows the kyanite isograd. Under this criterion, crystals of kyanite appear upward of several meters from the lithologic change.

By the difference in U-Pb detrital zircon ages, 1.87–2.60 Ga zircons have been reported from the Lesser Himalayan Sequence which is bound above by the Main Central Thrust, and 0.8–1.0 Ga zircons have been reported from the Greater Himalayan Sequence which is bound below by the Main Central Thrust.

Neodymium isotope composition differs across the thrust. Nd composition changes mark the Main Central Thrust. For example, an average Nd Epsilon value of −21.5 has been reported in the Lesser Himalayan Sequence while an average Nd Epsilon value of −16 has been reported in the Greater Himalayan Sequence.

By strain, the Main Central Thrust is defined as a broad zone which a few kilometers thick. This zone accommodates most of the ductile shear zones and brittle thrust faults between the lowermost part of the Greater Himalayan Crystalline complex and the uppermost part of the Lesser Himalayan Sequence.

== Prospect ==
None of the above definitions are precise because the Main Central Thrust developed and changes its style not only vertically but also along its strike, and even through time. Also, its definition should not be limited to one thrust fault, but should be a broader fault zone. To better understand the Main Central Thrust, more research should be done along its strike and through time.

== See also ==
- South Tibetan Detachment
