= Drop =

Drop, DROP, drops or DROPS may refer to:

- Drop (liquid) or droplet, a small volume of liquid
  - Eye drops, saline (sometimes mydriatic) drops used as medication for the eyes
- Drop (unit), a unit of measure of volume
- Falling (physics), allowing an object to fall or drop
  - Free fall
- Drop, or topographic prominence, the height of a hill above its surroundings

== Computers and technology ==
- Drop (SQL), a command in SQL queries to remove an existing database, table, index, or view
- Drop (telecommunication), the portion of a device directly connected to the internal station facilities
- Don't Route Or Peer (DROP) list, a list of spam sources
- Drops (app), a language learning app

== Confectionery ==
- Drops (confectionery), a general term for small, round sweets
- Lemon drop (candy), a hard-sugar, lemon-flavored sweet
- Hershey's Drops, chocolate sweets based on the Hershey bar
- London drops, a Swedish/Finnish sugar-coated liquorice sweet
- Drop (Eng. Salty liquorice), a common Dutch sweet
- Cough drop, or throat lozenge, a medicated confectionery

== Sports ==
- Drops Cycling Team, a British women's professional cycling team
- Drop (boxing), a type of punch used in boxing
- Drop kick, a type of kick in various forms of football and rugby
- Drop goal, a way of scoring points in rugby
- Bat drop, a calculation used to regulate baseball bats
- Drop ball (disambiguation)
- Drop shot (disambiguation)

== Music and media ==
- Drop (music), a section in music where the music will crescendo to a climax, pause briefly, then resume
- Needle drop (DJing), a technique used by DJs to cue music quickly
- Drops, a J-Pop voice acting group under the label Starchild
- Drop, a term used as a verb or noun, to refer to a music release or other media release
  - A combined media release, such as a whole season of television or a batch of episodes, released together simultaneously, rather than at typical intervals (e.g. weekly)

=== Albums ===
- Drop (The Shamen album), 1987
- Drop (Bride album), 1995
- Drop (Gavin Harrison & 05Ric album), 2007
- Drop (Thee Oh Sees album), 2014
- D.R.O.P., a 1989 album by Japanese rock band Zelda

=== Songs ===
- "Drop" (The Pharcyde song), 1995
- "Drop" (Timbaland & Magoo song), 2001
- "Drop" (Rich Boy song), 2009
- "Drop" (Dallas Smith song), 2019
- "Drop!" (song), by Forrest Frank, 2025
- "Drop", by Blue October from the album Consent to Treatment, 2000
- "Drop", by Chloe x Halle from the EP Sugar Symphony, 2016
- "Drop", by Robert Forster from the album Calling from a Country Phone, 1993
- "Drop", by Kenji and Artofficial, early aliases for Mike Shinoda and Joe Hahn respectively, 1998
- "Drop", by American jazz artist, Plunky, 2006
- "Drop", by Ying Yang Twins, 2008
- "Drop", by Khalisol which represented New Mexico in the American Song Contest, 2022
- "Drops" (song), by Maaya Sakamoto, 2025

== Other uses ==
- Drop (b-boy move), a breakdancing technique
- Drop (company), an American e-commerce company
- Drop (loyalty program), a Canadian coalition customer loyalty program
- Drop (policy debate), an argument that goes unanswered
- Drop, Masovian Voivodeship, a village in east-central Poland
- Ball drop, an annual event held every New Year's Eve in New York City's Times Square
- Dead drop, a method of passing items or information within espionage tradecraft
- Voltage drop, a decrease in voltage across electrical devices in a circuit
- Deferred Retirement Option Plan, or Deferred Retirement Option Program
- Demountable Rack Offload and Pickup System (DROPS), a family of logistics vehicles operated by the British Army
- Drop (film), a 2025 American thriller

== See also ==
- The Drop (disambiguation)
- Dewdrop (disambiguation)
- Drip (disambiguation)
- Droplets (disambiguation)
- Dropout (disambiguation)
- Dropped (disambiguation)
- Dropper
- Dropping (disambiguation)
