= Drip =

Drip, The Drip, or DRIP may refer to:

- Drop (liquid)

== Biology and medicine ==
- Intravenous therapy
- Vitamin D receptor interacting protein (DRIP)
- Mesomycetozoea, a class of eukaryotes (also known as DRIP clade)
- Murphy drip, in proctoclysis
- Post-nasal drip, excessive mucus produced by the sinuses

== Language ==
- Drip, a dated, mild pejorative for 'an uninteresting person'
- Drip, a Gen Z slang term for 'one's fashion/style'

== Law ==
- Data Retention and Investigatory Powers Act 2014, a piece of UK legislation
- Declaration on the Rights of Indigenous Peoples

== Music ==
- "Drip" (Cardi B song), featuring Migos
- "Drip" (Brooke Candy song), featuring Erika Jayne
- The Drips, an American punk band
- "Drips", a song by Eminem and Obie Trice from the album The Eminem Show
- "Drip", the debut single by South Korean girl group Hinapia
- "Drip", a 2019 song by Mike Posner from the album A Real Good Kid
- Drip (album), the first studio album of South Korean girl group Babymonster
  - "Drip" (Babymonster song)
- The Drip, a 2021 EP by Hayley Mary
- "Drip", a 2024 song by South Korean girl group Kep1er from the extended play Tipi-tap
- The Drip, a band signed to Blackhouse Records

== Film and television ==
- "The Drip" (Schitt's Creek), a 2015 episode of the television series Schitt's Creek
- "Drip" a television ident for BBC Two used in the 2001–2007 ident series (BBC Two 'Personality' idents)
- The Drip, a 1985 short film featuring actor Aidan Gillen

== Technology ==
- Drip gas, natural gas condensate
- Drip irrigation, in agriculture and gardening
- Drip email (campaign), the process of automatically sending planned, scheduled emails to contacts or prospects
- DRIP, one of the MARID protocol proposals in computing

== Other uses ==
- Drip painting, an art style
- Lithospheric drip, in geology
- DRIP, dividend reinvestment plan, in finance

== See also ==
- Drop (disambiguation)
- Leak
- - Drip brew, a coffee brewing method
    - Drip-O-lator, a drip brew coffee pot
  - Drip line (disambiguation)
  - Drip pan, in an oven
  - Dripetrua
  - Dripping Springs (disambiguation)
  - Dripsey, Ireland
  - Dripstick
  - Dripstone (disambiguation)
  - Driptorch, a tool used in firefighting and forestry
