= Droplets (disambiguation) =

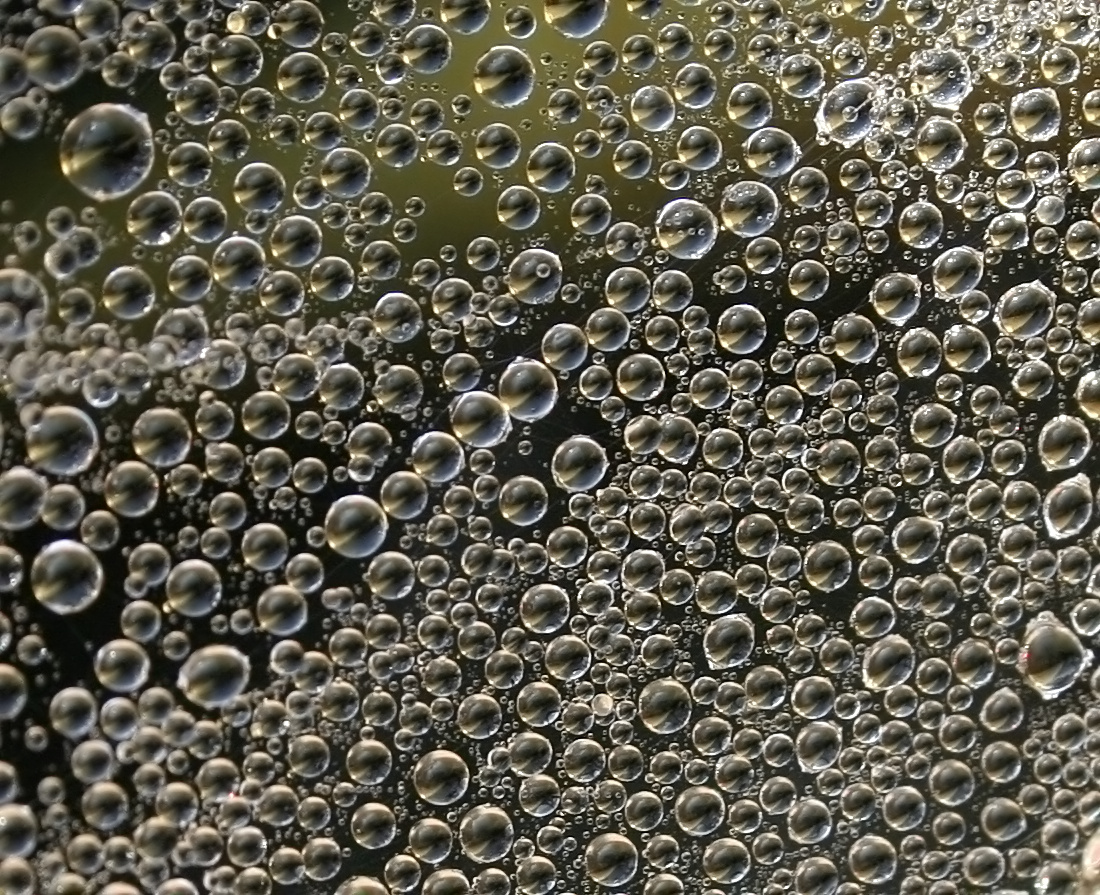
Water droplets

Droplet ("little drop") and droplets (plural form) may refer to:

- Water droplet, a small column of water (liquid)
- Oil droplet, a small column of oil (liquid)

== Technology ==
- Acoustic droplet vaporization, the phase-transitioned of liquid droplets into gas bubbles by means of ultrasound
- Acoustic droplet ejection, move of fluid drops without any physical contact by means of ultrasound
- Droplet-shaped wave, casual localized solutions of the wave equation
- Electrodynamic droplet deformation, liquid droplets suspended in a liquid exposed to an oscillating electric field
- Electron-hole droplets, condensed phase of excitons in semiconductors
- Liquid droplet radiator, a proposed lightweight radiator
- Droplets (programming environment), a computer programming environment
- Droplets, the name for virtual private servers from DigitalOcean
- A kind of applet in Apple's scripting language AppleScript

== Biology and medicine ==
- Lipid droplet, lipid-rich cellular organelles
- Respiratory droplet, pathogen-containing particles of respiratory secretions

== Other ==
- Hand-with-droplets (hieroglyph), the ancient Egyptian Hand-with-droplets hieroglyph

== See also ==
- Drop (disambiguation)
