= Dripping (disambiguation) =

Dripping may refer to:

- Dripping liquid
- Dripping, animal fat used in cooking
- Dripping (art)
- Dripping cake, traditional bread from Great Britain
- "Dripping", a song by Blonde Redhead from their 2014 album Barragán

== See also ==
- Dripping Springs (disambiguation)
- Lizzie Dripping, British children's television show
- Drip (disambiguation)
