= Drip Drop =

Drip Drop may refer to:

- "Drip Drop", a 2009 song by American rapper Rasheeda off of her fifth studio album Certified Hot Chick
- "Drip Drop" (Safura song), a 2010 song by Azerbaijani singer Safura Alizadeh
- "Drip Drop" (Leiber and Stoller song), a 1958 song performed by The Drifters and also Dion
- "Drip Drop", a 2006 song by Vanessa Hudgens from the album V
- "Drip Drop", a 2009 song by Moka Only and Kissey Asplund from the album Lowdown Suite 2… The Box

== See also ==
- Drip (disambiguation)
- Drop (disambiguation)
