= Dipstick =

Measuring device

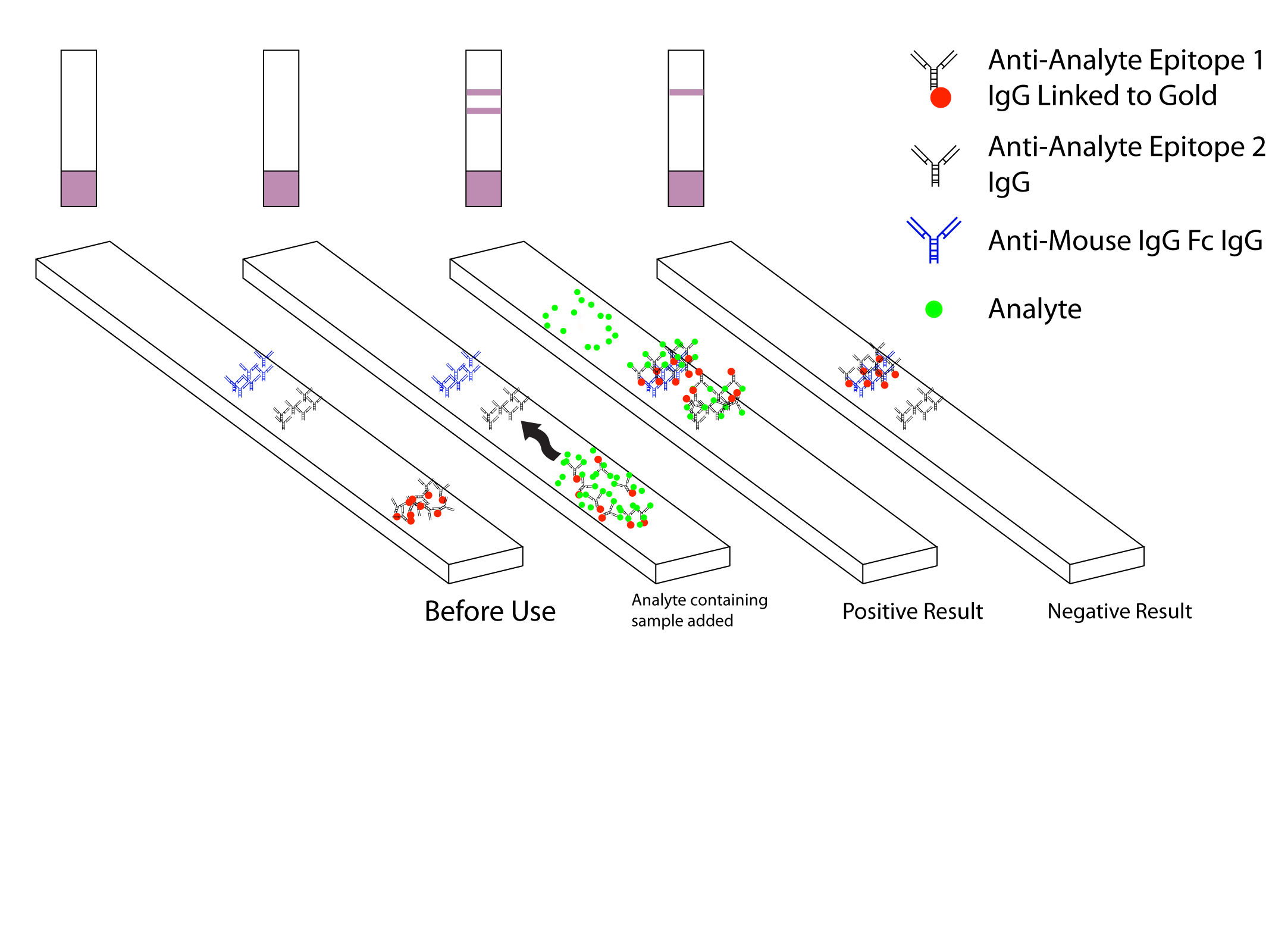
A schematic diagram of an average diagnostic dipstick

A dipstick is one of several measurement devices.

Some dipsticks are dipped into a liquid to perform a chemical test or to provide a measure of quantity of the liquid.

Since the late 20th century, a flatness/levelness measuring device trademarked "Dipstick" has been used to produce concrete and pavement surface profiles and to help establish profile measurement standards in the concrete floor and paving industries.

== Testing dipstick ==
A testing dipstick is usually made of paper or cardboard and is impregnated with reagents that indicate some feature of the liquid by changing color. In medicine, dipsticks can be used to test for a variety of liquids for the presence of a given substance, known as an analyte. For example, urine dipsticks are used to test urine samples for haemoglobin, nitrite (produced by bacteria in a urinary tract infection), protein, nitrocellulose, glucose and occasionally urobilinogen or ketones.

They are usually brightly coloured, and extremely rough to the touch.

== Measuring dipstick ==
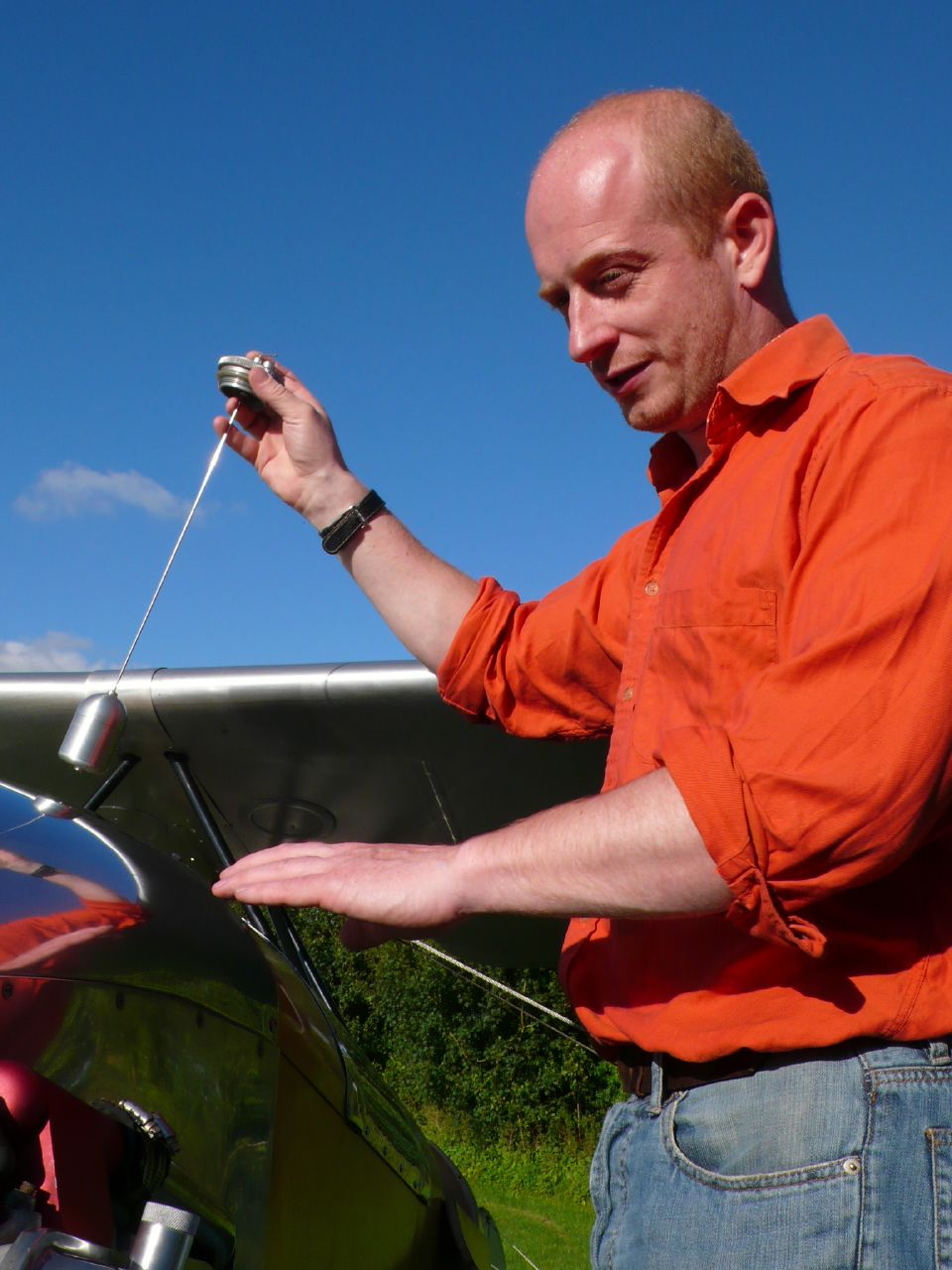
Using a dipstick to measure the amount of fuel remaining in a tank

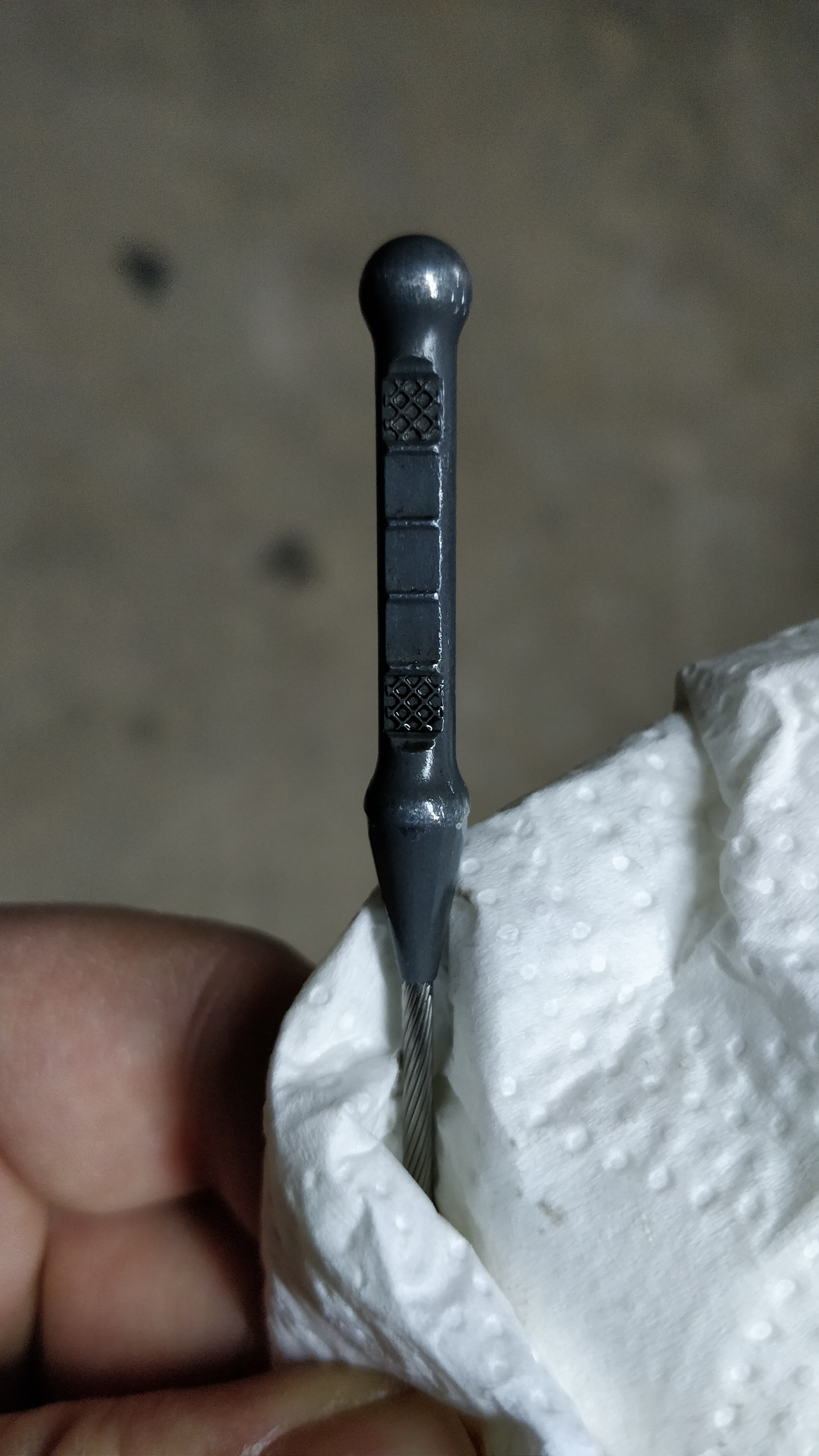
The lower end of an oil dipstick with markings for minimum and maximum oil levels

Dipsticks can also be used to measure the quantity of liquid in an otherwise inaccessible space, by inserting and removing the stick and then checking the extent of it covered by the liquid. The most familiar example is the oil level dipstick found on most internal combustion engines.

Other kinds of dipsticks are used to measure everything from fuel levels to the amount of beer left in an ale cask or firkin.

== Floor and pavement profiler ==
"Dipstick" is the trade name of a profiling device manufactured by Face Construction Technologies of Norfolk, Virginia, US. The instrument is used in 66 countries on six continents to measure the flatness and levelness of concrete floor slabs and pavements.

The Dipstick measures concrete floor slab flatness/levelness in terms of Face Floor Profile Numbers ("F-Numbers"), a profile measurement system adopted in 1990 by the American Concrete Institute. The Dipstick is 'walked' across sections of the floor between two successive points and data is collated. This is now regarded by some in the industry as a long slow process with other profiling devices available offering accurate results in less time. The Dipstick can have a variable sampling rate from 75mm up to 300mm.

F-Number measurement procedures were established by ASTM Standard E1155. The instrument also measures TR-34 Free Movement (FM); TR-34 Defined Movement (DM); Gap under Sliding Unleveled Straightedge; Gap under Rolling Straightedge; and DIN 18202.

The U.S. Federal Highway Administration (FHWA) and the World Bank (with its International Roughness Index or "IRI") have established measurement procedures using Dipstick profiler data.

The American Association of State Highway and Transportation Officials (AASHTO) has established its Standard R 41 (most recently published as R 41-05 (2010)) to, "... manually collect precision profile data utilizing the Face Technologies Dipstick. The instrument measures profiles (relative elevation differences) at a rate and accuracy greater than traditional rod and level surveys. Procedures for measuring both longitudinal and transverse profiles are described."

The Dipstick, with a reported accuracy of 0.01 mm (0.0004 inches), measures "true" profiles and is the most widely used and accepted Class 1 profiler for the purposes of calibrating other profilers. Although, most state DOTs now use rolling inclinometer based systems for AASHTO r56 certification procedures which collect at the same 25mm sampling interval as highway profilers.

Dipstick was used to obtain data that were used as ground truth in FHWA evaluations of the repeatability of IRI values as measured by other profilers and in Long-Term Pavement Performance (LTTP) studies conducted by several states.

The instrument was similarly used to produce reference measurements by the World Road Association (PIARC) in its 1998 "International Experiment to Harmonise Longitudinal and Transverse Profile Measurement and Reporting Procedures." The PIARC experiment was conducted in the US, Japan, Holland and Germany and included IRI values from airport runways and super highways to rough unpaved roads.

== See also ==
- Dripstick
- Litmus
- Urine test strip
