= Kshiroda plate =

Minor oceanic plate in the Tethys Sea

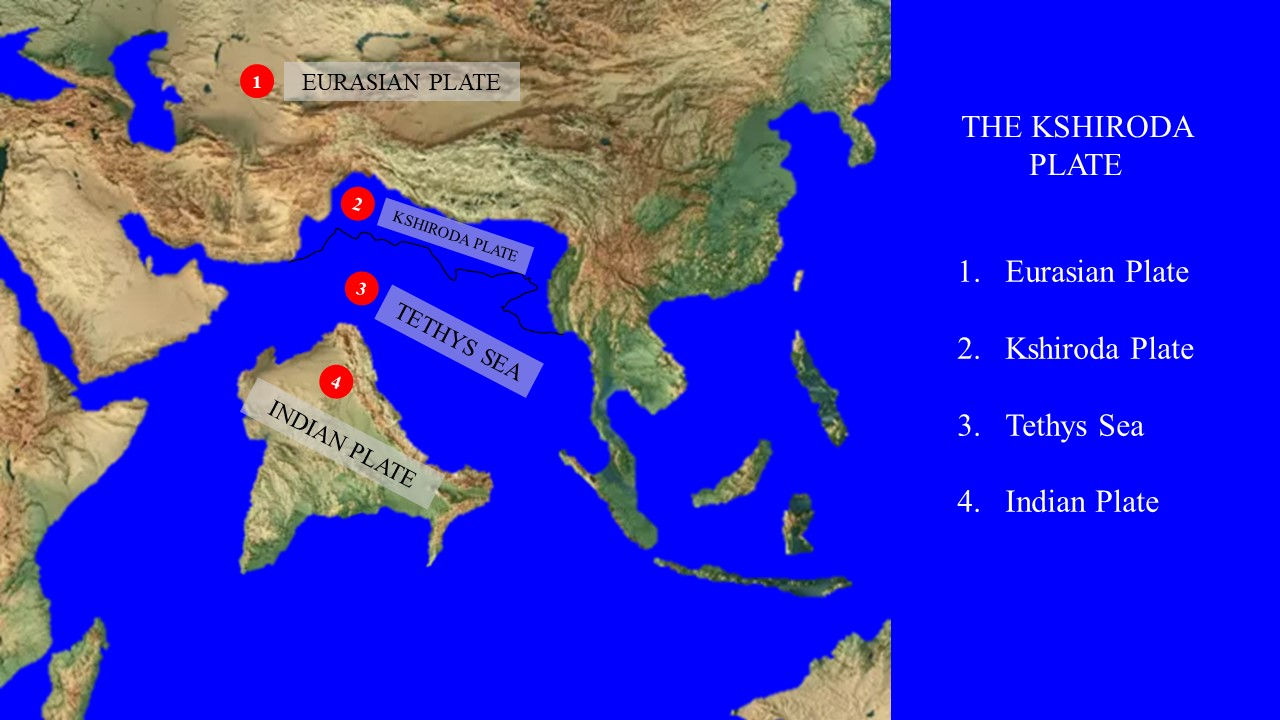
- The Kshiroda plate to the south of the Eurasian plate(>50 mya)
- Features: Tibetan Plateau, Tethys Ocean, Indian Ocean, Himalayas

The Kshiroda plate (/ʃɪˈroʊdə/) is a hypothetical oceanic tectonic plate which is believed to have existed more than 40 million years ago, to the south of the Eurasian plate, corresponding to the regions of modern South Asia.

== Discovery ==
The Kshiroda plate was discovered when geologists studying the boundary zone between the Indian and Eurasian plates, noticed that the data supported the existence of two parallel subduction zones between the plates.

This was studied in detail in 2015 by Oliver Jagoutz, a geologist at the Massachusetts Institute of Technology, Cambridge, Massachusetts, and his team, who identified the possibilities of a hidden tectonic plate in the region.

The usage of the term "Kshiroda plate" began the same year 2015.

== Subduction ==
An oversimplified visualization of the subduction of the Kshiroda plate and the delamination of the Indian plate

Around 50 million years ago, the Indian plate collided with the southern subduction zone of the Kshiroda oceanic plate causing the plate to shrink. It was pushed northwards and eventually collapsed more than 40 million years ago. It was pushed below the crust of the Eurasian plate and this led to the formation of the Tibetan Plateau and the Himalayas.

It is possible that the impact might have caused the delamination of the Indian plate beneath the Tibetan Plateau, a process which is still continuing.

== Significance ==
The Kshiroda plate has great significance in the geology of South Asia. The subduction of the plate, which occurred before 40 million years ago, caused the upliftment of the Tibetan Plateau.

The Tethys Sea bed which used to rest on the Kshiroda plate was pushed above the Eurasian landmass leading to the formation of the earliest mountains of the Himalayas, while the rest of the mountains were formed due to the folding of the Indian and Eurasian continental landmasses.

== See also ==
- Indo-Eurasian collision system
- Indian plate
- Himalayas
- Palaeogeography
- Eurasian plate
