= ADV =

Adv. or ADV may refer to:

== Arts and media ==
- Adventure type of visual novel
- A.D. Vision, a defunct multimedia entertainment company based in Houston, Texas, and its subsidiaries:
  - ADV Films, a former publisher of anime and tokusatsu videos
  - ADV Manga, a former publisher of manga
  - ADV Music

== Science and technology ==
- Acoustic Doppler velocimetry, in flow measurement
- Acoustic droplet vaporization
- Automatic diluent valve, a component of a diving rebreather
- Aleutian disease Virus, a disease of ferrets and minks, or the virus that causes it
- Australian Defence Vessel, a non-commissioned vessel in the Royal Australian Navy

== Transport infrastructure ==
- Andover Airfield, Hampshire, UK (Previous IATA airport code ADV)
- Andover railway station (England), UK (National Rail code)
- Ed Daein Airport in East Darfur State, Sudan (IATA airport code ADV)

== Other uses ==
- Adventure
- Adverb
- Adverbial case
- Adversary in law; see Adversarial system
- Advertising
- Advocate
