= Floatstick =

Device used to measure fuel levels in modern large aircraft

A floatstick (left) stowed and (right) in use to measure fuel remaining in an aircraft fuel tank: 1. Magnets; 2. Float; 3. Fuel in tank; 4. Fuel tank wall; 5. Indication of remaining fuel in tank when floatstick is pulled down

A floatstick is a device to measure fuel levels in modern large aircraft. It consists of a closed tube rising from the bottom of the fuel tank. Surrounding the tube is a ring-shaped float, and inside it is a graduated rod indicating fuel capacity. The float and the top of the rod contain magnets. The rod is withdrawn from the bottom of the wing until the magnets stick, the distance it is withdrawn indicating the level of the fuel.

When not in use, the stick is secured within the tube. Older aircraft use a dripstick, which leaks fuel when used; a floatstick is much safer.
