= Plating (geology) =

In geology, plating is a hypothesized process whereby asthenospheric mantle hardens beneath crustal material, thereby becoming attached to it and thereafter moving together with the crustal material as part of the lithosphere.

A complementary process, although it does not necessarily always involve the upper mantle, is called delamination.

== See also ==
- Plate tectonics
- Delamination (geology)
- Ophiolite
