= Dropping =

Dropping is a gerundive of drop. It might refer to:

== In language ==
=== Skipping ===
- Copula dropping
- G dropping
- H-dropping
- Initial dropping
- R dropping
- Pronoun dropping
- Y dropping
- Yod-dropping

=== Using ===
- Dropping the F-bomb, swearing
- Name-dropping, mentioning names

== Falling ==
- Automatic dropping device, a pantograph safety system
- Dropping a deuce, defecation
- Dropping in, skating technique
- Dropping point, temperature for liquid droplets
- "Dropping the soap", slang for prison rape

== Other uses ==
- Dropping out, discontinuing education
- Eaves dropping, secretly listening
