= Dropped =

Dropped may refer to:

- Dropped (Consolidated album), 1998
- Dropped (Mind Funk album), 1993
- Dropped (TV series), a 2015 French reality series

== See also ==
- Drop (disambiguation)
