= The Drop =

The Drop may refer to:

== Arts, entertainment, and media ==
=== Literature ===
- The Drop (Connelly novel), a 2011 novel by Michael Connelly
- The Drop (Lehane novel), a 2014 novel by Dennis Lehane
- The Drop, a 2018 novella by Mick Herron in the Slough House series

=== Music ===
==== Albums ====
- The Drop (album), a 1997 album by Brian Eno
- The Drop, a 1997 album by Geoffrey Williams

==== Songs ====
- "The Drop", a 1957 song by Ray Conniff from Dance the Bop!
- "The Drop", a 1996 instrumental by Evan Parker from London Air Lift
- "The Drop", a 1997 song by Geoffrey Williams from the album
- "The Drop", a 2002 song by Peter Gabriel from the album Up
- "The Drop" (Regurgitator song), a 2004 single by Regurgitator
- "The Drop", a 2004 instrumental by Harry Gregson-Williams from the soundtrack for Man on Fire
- "The Drop", a 2006 song by Sucioperro from Random Acts of Intimacy
- "The Drop", a 2012 song by Oh No from Dr. No's Tornado Funk
- "The Drop" (Lethal Bizzle song), a 2014 song by Lethal Bizzle
- “The Drop”, a 2017 song and extended play by Gammer

=== Sports ===
- Relegation, when a team is moved to a lower division due to poor performance in an open league system.

=== Other arts, entertainment, and media ===
- The Drop (2014 film), a film, based on the Lehane novel
- The Drop (2022 film), American black comedy film
- The Drop (sculpture), a 2009 sculpture in Vancouver
- The Drop, an urban contemporary subchannel operated by KUVO
- The Drop, a BBC Three fashion streetwear competition show

== Other uses ==
- The Drop Hydro, a power station in Australia

== See also ==
- Drop (disambiguation)
