= Dropline (disambiguation) =

Dropline is a commercial fishing device.

Dropline may also refer to:

- Dropline GNOME, software

== See also ==
- Drip line (disambiguation)
