= Drop (breakdancing move) =

Breakdancing move

Drops are breakdancing techniques that allow b-boys to transition down to the floor and begin performing downrock. Drops may be designed to look flashy, painful, or both. A wide variety of other movements can serve the same purpose, and others such as the kip-up can work in reverse, moving the breaker up from the floor.

== Common drops ==
Some of the most common drops are listed below.

=== Knee Drop ===
This drop makes the breaker seem to kick himself and fall painfully down onto his knee. From a standing position, the left leg lifts backwards. The left foot kicks quickly forward so that it slams into the back of the right knee in a "figure-four" position. As the right leg collapses, the breaker falls forward (not to either side!). Ideally, unseen by observers, the left foot actually sticks out just to the right of the collapsing knee, and the toes should be pulled up hard. Instead of landing on the knee, the breaker lands on the toes of the left foot.

=== Sweep Drop ===
The breaker drops as one leg sweeps out around in a wide arc. As all the weight shifts to the left leg, the right leg kicks backwards. The left leg bends so that the body sinks toward the floor, and meanwhile, the right leg swings around toward the front of the body. The right (sweeping) leg remains straight throughout. By the time the right leg has swung around to point directly ahead, the left knee should be fully bent and the hands are ready to hit the floor and bear the body's weight. The swinging momentum continues into a 6-step or any other move.

=== Coin Drop ===
A Coin Drop is a transition made from Toprock directly into a Backspin, or more commonly into Windmills. It requires that the dancer shifts his/her weight from the left leg to the right leg, leans onto his/her right hand and then moves the weight onto his/her left hand/forearm - shoulder while his/her feet leave the ground. The momentum generated from performing a Coin Drop sends the dancer into a spin onto his/her back.
