= Dropout =

Dropout or drop out may refer to:

- Dropping out, prematurely leaving school, college or university

== Arts and entertainment ==
=== Film and television ===
- Dropout (film), a 1970 Italian drama
- "The Dropout", a 1970 episode of The Brady Bunch
- The Dropout (podcast), 2019 true crime podcast
  - The Dropout, a 2022 American miniseries based on the podcast

=== Games ===
- drop out (cards), to fold, i.e. to concede the current hand and take no further part in it

=== Music ===
- "Drop Out" (song), by Lil Pump, 2019
- "Drop Out," a song by Rocket from the Crypt from the 1995 album Scream, Dracula, Scream!
- "Drop Out", a song by Converge from the 2004 album You Fail Me
- "Drop Out", music of Dance Dance Revolution Extreme
- Drop Out with The Barracudas, by The Barracudas, 1981
- The Dropouts, an early incarnation of Priestess (band)

=== Other ===
- Dropout (streaming service), an American subscription media service provider owned by a company of the same name
- The Dropouts, an American comic strip by Howard Post

== Science and technology ==
- Dropout (astronomy), a radiation source whose radiation intensity falls off sharply
- Dropout (bicycle part), a type of fork end
- Dropout (communications), a momentary loss of signal
- Dropout (neural networks), a regularization technique for reducing overfitting

== See also ==
- Drop out ceiling, beneath existing fire sprinklers
- Turn on, tune in, drop out, a counterculture-era phrase popularized by Timothy Leary in 1966.
