= Acoustic droplet ejection =

Acoustic droplet ejection (ADE) uses a pulse of ultrasound to move low volumes of fluids (typically nanoliters or picoliters) without any physical contact. This technology focuses acoustic energy into a fluid sample in order to eject droplets as small as a picoliter. ADE technology is a very gentle process, and it can be used to transfer proteins, high molecular weight DNA and live cells without damage or loss of viability. This feature makes the technology suitable for a wide variety of applications including proteomics and cell-based assays.

== History ==
Acoustic droplet ejection was first reported in 1927 by Robert W. Wood and Alfred Loomis, who noted that when a high-power acoustic generator was immersed in an oil bath, a mound formed on the surface of the oil and, like a "miniature volcano", ejected a continuous stream of droplets. Ripples that appear in a glass of water placed on a loud speaker show that acoustic energy can be converted to kinetic energy in a fluid. If the volume is turned up enough, droplets will jump from the liquid. This technique was refined in the 1970s and 1980s by Xerox and IBM and other organizations to provide a single droplet on-demand for printing ink onto a page. Two California-based companies, EDC Biosystems Inc. and Labcyte Inc. (both now acquired by Beckman Coulter Life Sciences), exploit acoustic energy for two separate functions: 1) as a liquid transfer device and 2) as a device for liquid auditing.

== Ejection mechanism ==
To eject a droplet, a transducer generates and transfers acoustic energy to a source well. When the acoustic energy is focused near the surface of the liquid, a mound of liquid is formed and a droplet is ejected. The diameter of the droplet scales inversely with the frequency of the acoustic energy—higher frequencies produce smaller droplets. Unlike other liquid transfer devices, no pipette tips, pin tools, or nozzles touch the source liquid or destination surfaces. Liquid transfer methods that rely on droplet formation through an orifice, e.g., disposable tips or capillary nozzles, invariably lose precision as the transfer volume decreases. Touchless acoustic transfer provides a coefficient of variation (CV) that is significantly lower than other techniques and is independent of volume at the levels tested.

ADE shoots a droplet from a source well upward to an inverted receiving plate positioned above the source plate. Liquids ejected from the source are captured by dry plates due to surface tension. For larger volumes, multiple droplets can be rapidly ejected from the source (typically 100 to 500 droplets/sec) to the destination with the coefficient of variation typically <4% over a volume range of two orders of magnitude.

== Applications of acoustic transfer ==
The following applications are among those that can benefit from the features of acoustic droplet ejection:

- High throughput screening
- Microelectromechanical systems
- Assay miniaturization
- Eliminating cross-contamination
- Reducing plastic waste in biological research
- Direct loading of mass spectrometers

== See also ==
- Acoustic droplet vaporization
- Journal of Laboratory Automation Special Issue: Advancing Scientific Innovation with Acoustic Droplet Ejection
