= Drop shot (disambiguation) =

A drop shot is a type of shot in some racquet sports.

Drop shot or dropshot may also refer to:

- Drop Shot, a novel by Harlan Coben
- Dropshot (Transformers)
- Bomb shot, or drop shot, a type of mixed drink
- Operation Dropshot, or Dropshot, the code name for the United States contingency plans for a possible war with the Soviet Union

== See also ==
- Dropshotting
