= Drip line =

Drip line may refer to:

- Nuclear drip line, the lines beyond which protons or neutrons leak out of nuclei
- Tree drip line, the area defined by the outermost circumference of a tree canopy where water drips from and onto the ground, useful for tree crown measurement
- Drip irrigation line, where the tubes and hoses are laid

== See also ==
- Dropline (disambiguation)
