= Dewdrop =

Dewdrop may refer to:

- Dew
- Dewdrop, Kentucky
- Dewdrop Glacier
- Daddy Dewdrop

== See also ==
- Dew Drop, California
- Doudrop
