= Drop ball =

Drop ball may refer to:

- A dropped-ball in association football
- A sinkerball in baseball
- A similar type of pitch in softball
- Drop Ball is also a game from the "Cartoon Network" series "Adventure Time"

== See also ==
- Drop kick
