= Dripstone =

Dripstone may refer to:

- Hood mould or dripstone, an architectural feature for handling rain water
- Dripstone, a type of speleothem (cave formation) that includes stalactites
- Dripstone, a type of water filter made of porous stone
- Dripstone, New South Wales
