= Delamination (geology) =

Loss of lithosphere from a tectonic plate

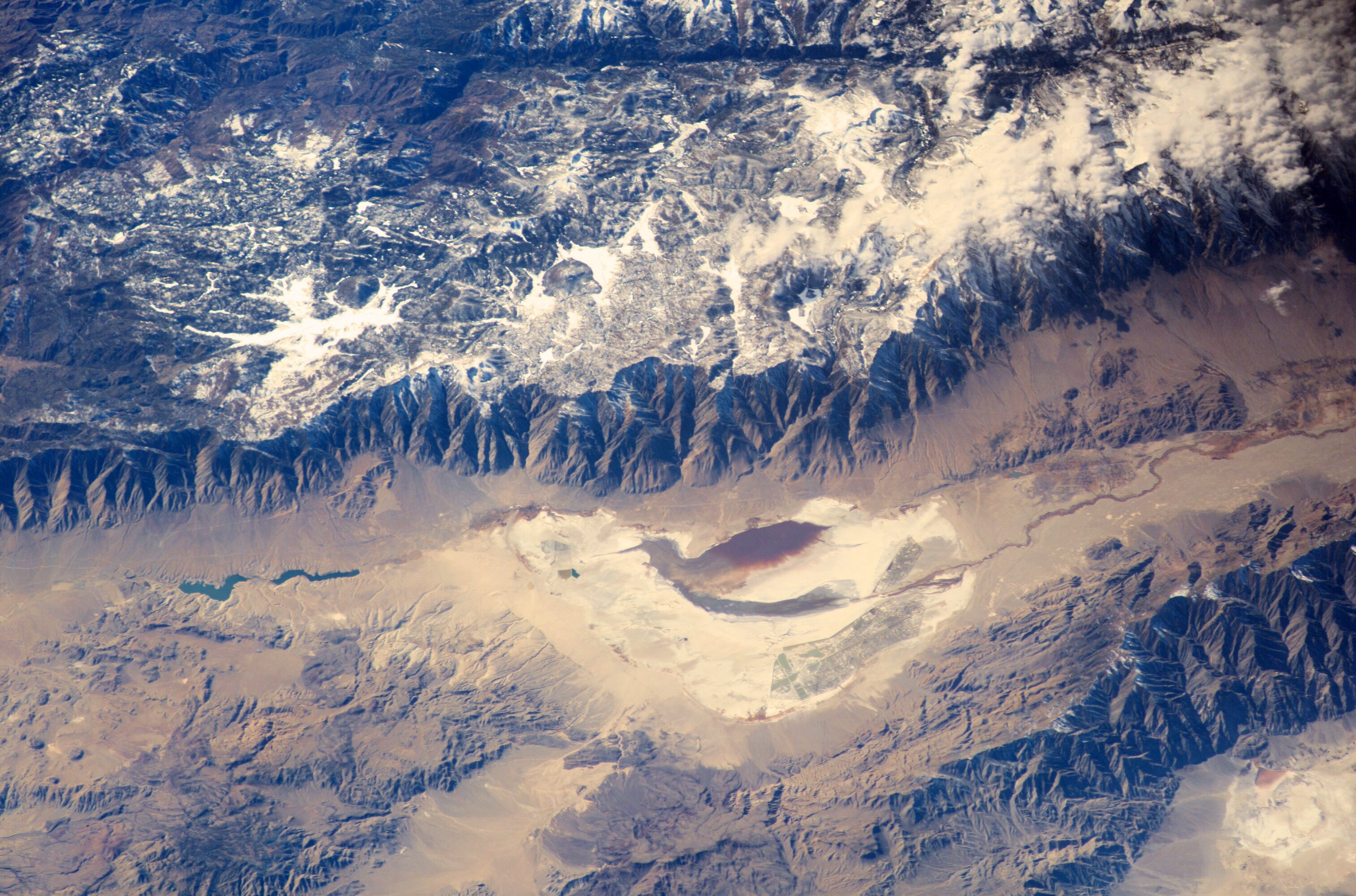
California's Sierra Nevada Mountains (formed by delamination) as seen from the International Space Station. When a large portion of dense materials was removed under the tectonic plate at this location, the remaining portion of the crust and lithosphere underwent a rapid uplift forming this mountain range.

In geodynamics, delamination is the loss and sinking (foundering) of the portion of the lowermost lithosphere from the tectonic plate to which it was attached.

== Mechanism ==
The outer portion of the Earth is divided into an upper, lithosphere layer and a lower, asthenosphere layer. The lithosphere layer is composed of two parts, an upper, the crustal lithosphere and a lower, the mantle lithosphere. The crustal lithosphere is in unstable mechanical equilibrium because the underlying mantle lithosphere has a greater density than the asthenosphere below. The difference in densities can be explained by thermal expansion/contraction, composition, and phase changes. Negative buoyancy of the lower continental crust and mantle lithosphere drive delamination.

Delamination occurs when the lower continental crust and mantle lithosphere break away from the upper continental crust. There are two conditions that need to be met in order for delamination to proceed:

- The lower lithosphere must be denser than the asthenosphere.
- The intrusion of more buoyant asthenosphere making contact with the crust and replacing dense lower lithosphere must occur.

The metamorphic transition from mafic granulite facies to the denser eclogite facies in the lower portion of the crust is the main mechanism responsible for creating negative buoyancy of the lower lithosphere. The lower crust undergoes a density inversion, causing it to break off of the upper crust and sink into the mantle. Density inversions are more likely to occur where there are high mantle temperatures. This limits this phenomenon to arc environments, volcanic rifted margins and continental areas undergoing extension.

The asthenosphere rises until it comes into contact with the base of the lower crust, causing the lower crust and lithospheric mantle to start to peel away. Slumping, cracking, or plume erosion facilitates the intrusion of underlying asthenosphere. Potential energy that drives the delamination is released as the low density, hot asthenosphere rises and replaces the higher density, cold lithosphere. Separation of lowermost crust and lithospheric mantle is controlled by the effective viscosity of the upper continental crust. These processes often occur in environments of rifting, plume erosion, continental collision or where there is convective instability.

Convective instabilities facilitate delamination. The convection can simply peel away the lower crust or, in a different scenario, a Rayleigh–Taylor instability is created. Due to the instability in a local area, the base of the lithosphere breaks up into descending blobs fed by an enlarging region of thinning lithosphere. The space left behind by departing lithosphere is filled by upwelling asthenosphere.

== Other factors in delamination ==
As delamination continues, more asthenosphere rises to replace the lower lithosphere as it sinks. This process causes three different changes to occur which can have an effect on the delamination process.

- If the viscosity of the upwelling asthenosphere is greater than that of the mantle lithosphere, delamination will stop.
- The upwelling asthenosphere forms two chilled, solid boundary layers on the top and bottom of the sill layer. This reduces the thickness of the portion of the lowermost crust which behaves viscously.
- Subsidence of the lithosphere acts to increase the thickness of the portion of the lowermost crust which behaves viscously.

If the freezing of the asthenosphere dominates (2) the system is stable, however if subsidence, and therefore separation of the lower lithosphere dominates (3) the system is unstable. Processes (2) and (3) compete with each other.

== Geologic effects ==
Delamination of the lithosphere has two major geologic effects. First, because a large portion of dense material is removed, the remaining portion of the crust and lithosphere undergo rapid uplift to form mountain ranges. Second, flow of hot mantle material encounters the base of the thin lithosphere and often results in melting and a new phase of volcanism. Delamination may thus account for some volcanic regions that have been attributed to mantle plumes in the past.

== Relation to tectonic processes ==
Delamination is seen in convergence zones, especially where continental-continental collisions occur. For example, delamination is seen in the Tibetan Plateau, which has formed from the collision of India with Asia. Observations which support delamination include sudden mafic volcanism and acceleration of uplift, occurring 14 to 11 Ma.

Areas of extension are also associated with delamination. Negative buoyancy of the lower lithosphere drives delamination in both environments of collision and extension. During the collapse of a mountain belt, the thick crustal roots beneath what used to be a mountain disappear. The processes behind this disappearance are not clear. Granitic plutons formed by strong heat pulses have been associated with the disappearance of thick crustal roots. Delamination is a likely source for the heat pulses.

The tectonic development of collapsed mountain belts is heavily debated. Some argue that delamination causes a second uplift along with crustal thickening, heating and volcanism. Others argue that delamination causes collapse and thinning of the crust. Some researchers postulate that the Sierra Nevada (California), Basin and Range Province and Colorado Plateau in the western US exemplify this.

== Geologic examples ==
One example of the effects of lithosphere delamination is seen in the Sierra Nevada (US)², Basin and Range Province and Colorado Plateau in the western USA. During crustal extension in the Basin and Range Province 10 million years ago, the upwelling of asthenosphere thinned the lithosphere. Heating caused by the rise of the warmer asthenosphere created a crustal lower-viscosity zone and delamination occurred on the flanks of the Basin and Range. Uplift of the Sierra Nevada mountain range in California and the Colorado Plateau has occurred on the flanks as a result of the loss of high density lower lithosphere. Eclogite xenoliths found within the crust in the region support the metamorphic phase change associated with the density inversion in the lower crust. It is possible that the Sierra Nevada (US) is the only place on Earth where dense material is currently being removed from the crust.

== See also ==
- Lithospheric drip
- Mountain building
- Orogeny
- Epeirogeny
- Plate tectonics
- Mantle convection
- Plating (geology)
