= Dripstick =

Device to measure fuel levels in large aircraft

A dripstick is a thin hollow tube installed vertically in the bottoms of fuel tanks of many large aircraft, used to check fuel levels. To read a dripstick, it is withdrawn from the lower surface of the wing. When the top of the dripstick is withdrawn below the level of the fuel, fuel enters it and drips through a hole in the cap. Graduations on it indicate the level of fuel in the tank.

Newer aircraft use a floatstick.
