= Lithospheric drip =

Geological process

A lithospheric drip is a geological phenomenon in which a dense and relatively cold mass of lithosphere sinks into the more fluid upper mantle. The regions of descending material have been detected by seismic tomography methods and modeled as near vertically oriented cylindrical masses within the upper mantle. The lithospheric drip discovered below the Great Basin in central Nevada has dimensions of 100 km diameter by 500 km vertical length.

Another area underlain by a descending cylindrical mass of dense lithosphere has been reported in the southwestern Sierra Nevada and portions of the San Joaquin Valley of California. Here a 100 km by 225 km mass of relatively high density (fast p wave velocity) has been discovered below an area of anomalous topography.
