= Dripping Springs =

Dripping Springs may refer to the following places in the United States:

- Dripping Springs, Carter County, Oklahoma
- Dripping Springs, Delaware County, Oklahoma
- Dripping Springs Park, formerly Dripping Springs State Park, in Okmulgee County, Oklahoma
- Dripping Springs, Texas
- Natural Falls State Park, formerly known as known as Dripping Springs, in the Ozarks, in Delaware County, Oklahoma.
- Dripping Springs Natural Area, in the Organ Mountains, New Mexico
- Dripping Springs, in the New Water Mountains, Arizona
- Dripping Springs Trail, Grand Canyon, Arizona

== See also ==
- Dripping liquid
- Spring (hydrology)
