= Acoustic droplet vaporization =

Process of transitioning liquid droplets into gas bubbles by ultrasound

Acoustic droplet vaporization (ADV) is the process by which superheated liquid droplets are phase-transitioned into gas bubbles by means of ultrasound. Perfluorocarbons and halocarbons are often used for the dispersed medium, which forms the core of the droplet. The surfactant, which forms a stabilizing shell around the dispersive medium, is usually composed of albumin or lipids.

There exist two main hypothesis that explain the mechanism by which ultrasound induces vaporization. One poses that the ultrasonic field interacts with the dispersed medium so as to cause vaporization in the bubble core. The other suggests that shockwaves from inertial cavitation, occurring near or within the droplet, cause the dispersed medium to vaporize.

== See also ==
- Acoustic droplet ejection
