= 1803 Garhwal earthquake =

Earthquake in India

- Location within India
- Local date: 1 September 1803
- Local time: 01:30
- Magnitude: M_{w} 7.8 ± 0.2
- Epicenter: 30.656°N 78.784°E
- Fault: Main Himalayan Thrust
- Type: Thrust (Blind)
- Areas affected: India & Pakistan
- Max. intensity: MMI IX (Violent); MSK-64 X (Devastating)
- Casualties: 200–300 dead

The 1803 Garhwal earthquake occurred in the early morning of September 1 at 01:30 local time. The estimated 7.8-magnitude-earthquake had an epicenter in the Garhwal Himalaya near Uttarkashi, British India. Major damage occurred in the Himalaya and Indo-Gangetic Plain, with the loss of between 200 and 300 lives. It is among the largest Himalaya earthquakes of the 19th-century, caused by thrust faulting.

== Tectonic setting ==
The Himalaya is located at the convergent boundary where active convergence leads to continental collision. The India and Eurasian plates began colliding approximately 50 million years ago when the Tethys Ocean closed. The Main Himalayan Thrust (MHT), a decollement structure, defines the boundary between the Indian plate and Eurasian plate. The convergent zone also contains three other major faults; the Main Boundary Thrust, Main Central Thrust and South Tibetan Detachment. At the surface, the Main Himalayan Thrust propagates along the Main Frontal Thrust (MFT). These faults runs for approximately 2,300 km in an east–west direction, parallel to the southern foothills of the Lower Himalayan Range from Assam, through Nepal, and into Pakistan. This major thrust fault dips to the north, beneath the Himalaya at a shallow angle. It is the source of most of Himalayan earthquakes.

Earthquakes on the convergent boundary are megathrust events that repeat every few centuries. Large Himalayan earthquakes including those in 1505, 1934 and 1950 with magnitudes of 8.0+ were the result of rupturing the Main Himalayan Thrust. These events generated surface ruptures by breaching the surface via the MFT.

== Impact ==
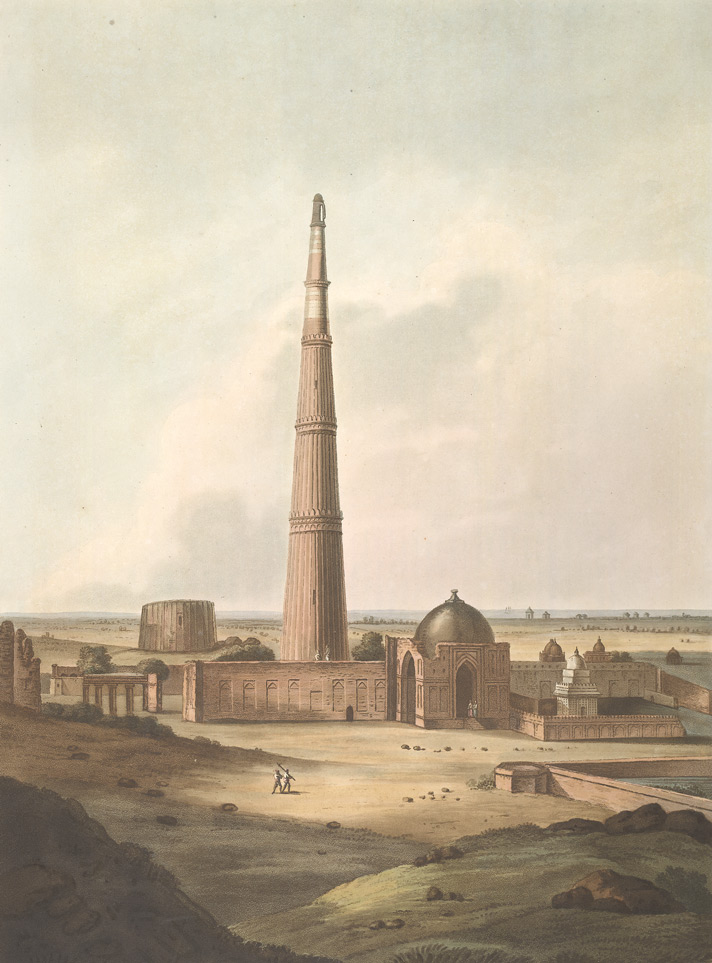
An artwork of the Qutub Minar in 1805.

At Srinagar in the meizoseismal area, an estimated 500–1,000 homes were destroyed, and a landslide occurred. Ground fissures and liquefaction events took place in Mathura, near Aligarh and Agra. An estimated 200–300 people died due to collapsing roofs. Partial damage occurred in the towns Devprayag, Joshimath, Badrinath and Almora. A landslide buried the small village and fort on the eastern bank of the Yamuna River in Uttar Pradesh.

The shaking was strongly felt in Mathura and lasted several minutes. It destroyed many pucca homes in the city. Many residents were driven out of their homes, and into the streets or agricultural fields. A pregnant woman died after being struck by falling tiles. Large fissures occurred in fields, spilling vast quantities of water. One of the fissures partially swallowed the dome of a mosque. The fissures continued to eject water for several weeks, benefitting the residents who were able to obtain water.

The Hindu Badrinath Temple suffered severe damage from the quake. Several temples, including the Kashi Vishwanath Temple in Uttarkashi, and Tungnath, were totally destroyed.

The earthquake occurred at the beginning of the Siege of Aligarh during Second Anglo-Maratha War. Aligarh Fort was captured by the British East India Company from the Marathi people and French. The siege came to an end because the severely damage fort walls were breached, easing capture for the British.

At New Delhi, a cupola in the Qutb Minar collapsed and the main column was structurally weakened. Reports documented that the spire of the Khanqah-e-Moula in Kashmir Valley's Srinagar also collapsed, although it may have been a conflation with a previous earthquake. Fissuring was also observed in the city. Seiches in a water tank at the Acharya Jagadish Chandra Bose Indian Botanic Garden in Calcutta caused by the quake was strong enough to throw fishes out of their aquarium.

== Earthquake ==
The earthquake is believed to have ruptured the MHT but did not propagate to the surface. It shared similar characteristics with the 1905 Kangra and the two 2015 Nepal earthquakes; all three events failed to rupture the MHT, hence did not produce any surface rupture. This blind thrust earthquake is the largest in the Indian Himalaya during the 19th-century. Another similar-sized event occurred in Nepal in August 1833. This earthquake was located immediately east of the great 1505 earthquake rupture zone. Two smaller earthquakes; the 1991 Uttarkashi and 1999 Chamoli earthquakes, also occurred in the epicenter region of the 1803 event.

Descriptions of severe damage and ground effects from the event suggest the earthquake rupture initiated beneath the Himalaya range, and propagated south; up-dip along the MHT in a northwest–southeast direction. The rupture ceased just short of the MFT. Accumulated stress to the east caused by the 1505 event was released during the 1803 quake. An estimated maximum coseismic slip of 4.5 meters or less occurred. Since then, roughly 3 meters of slip have accumulated. The two earthquakes in 1991 and 1999 failed to release the seismic strain accumulated since the 1803 event.

The moment magnitude was previously assigned 8.0 in past academic journals based on damage descriptions and felt reports from the historical documentation, but more recent reassessments indicate a much smaller magnitude of 7.8. The earthquake magnitude has even been downgraded to 7.3 in some journals.

A macroseismic intensity survey from 1979 assigned the holy city Badrinath with VII (Very strong)–IX (Violent)-level shaking on the Modified Mercalli intensity scale. A 2005 journal by geologist C. P. Rajendran and seismologist Kusala Rajendran published in Tectonophysics assigned the maximum Medvedev–Sponheuer–Karnik scale intensity at IX–X in Srinagar and Devprayag.

== See also ==
- List of earthquakes in Nepal
- List of earthquakes in India
- List of historical earthquakes
