= Nepal earthquake =

The Nepal earthquake may refer to:

- 1833 Bihar–Nepal earthquake
- 1934 Nepal–India earthquake
- 1980 Nepal earthquake
- 1988 Nepal earthquake
- April 2015 Nepal earthquake, a magnitude 7.8 earthquake, killing thousands
  - May 2015 Nepal earthquake, a magnitude 7.3 aftershock of the April earthquake
  - List of aftershocks of April 2015 Nepal earthquake
- 2023 Nepal earthquake

== See also ==
- List of earthquakes in Nepal
