= Safety drill =

Training for the event of an emergency

A safety drill is a workout that is practised to prepare people for an emergency.

== Fire drills ==
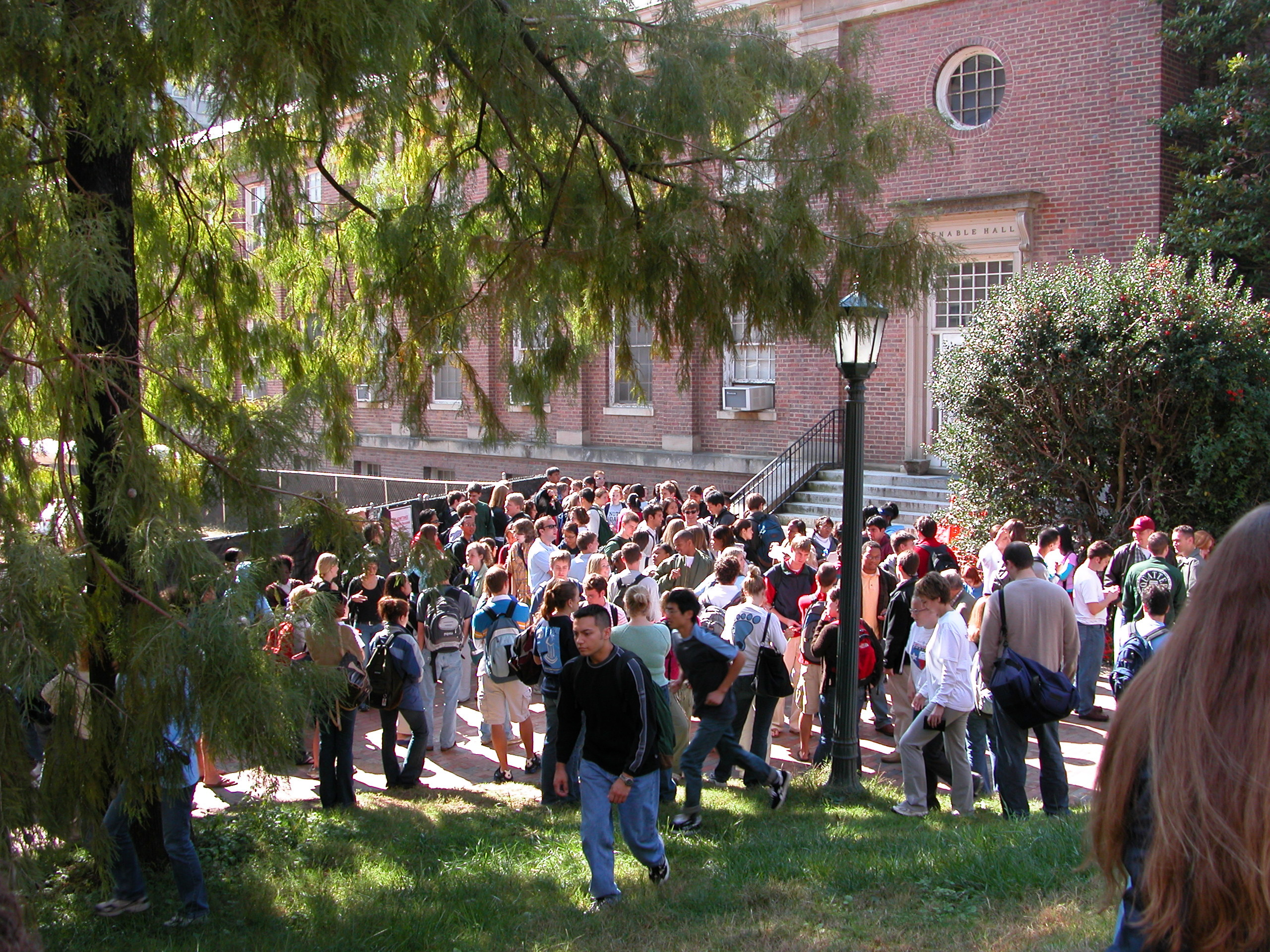
Students of the University of North Carolina at Chapel Hill having evacuated a building during a fire drill

A fire drill is a method of practising how a building would be evacuated in the event of a fire or other emergency. Fire drills are most common in school or workplaces. Usually, the building's existing fire alarm system is activated and the building is evacuated as if the emergency had occurred. Generally, the time it takes to evacuate is measured to ensure that it occurs within a reasonable length of time, and problems with the emergency system or evacuation procedures are identified to be remedied.

== Tornado drills ==
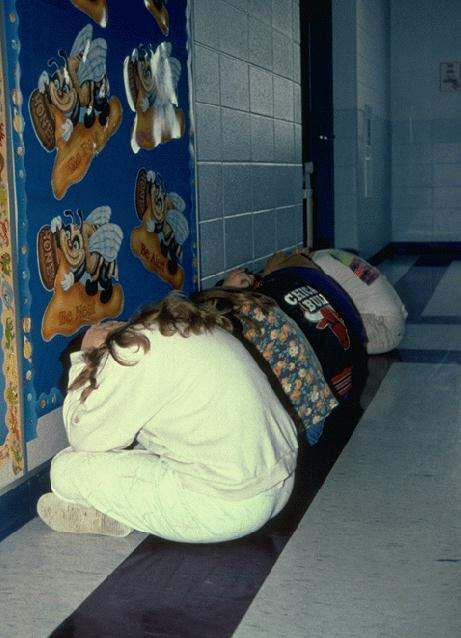
Students participate in a tornado drill, lining up along an interior wall and covering their heads.

Tornado drills are an important element in tornado preparedness. Like any other safety drills, they increase chances of correct response to a real tornado threat.

Most states in the Midwestern and southern United States conduct a statewide tornado drill in late winter or early spring in preparation for the severe weather season. During these drills, the National Weather Service issues test tornado warnings, and local Emergency Alert Systems and/or NOAA Weather Radio (normally as a Required Weekly Test or Required Monthly Test; Live Tornado Warning Codes can only be used if a waiver from the FCC is granted since "Live Code Testing" is prohibited per regulations) are activated along with outdoor warning sirens. Schools and businesses may also conduct a tornado drill simultaneously.

A tornado drill is a procedure of practicing to take cover in a specified location in the event that a tornado strikes an area. This safety drill is an important element of tornado preparedness.

Generally, a signal is given, such as a series of tones (ex. Continuous Tone), or a voice announcement. Upon receiving the signal, building occupants of schools, hospitals, factories, shopping centers, etc. proceed to a designated location, usually an interior room or corridor with no windows, and assume a protective position.

In homes and small buildings one must go to the basement or an interior room on the lowest floor (if there), (closet, bathroom), to stay away from glass.

Cars and mobile homes must be abandoned, if there is small chance to drive away.

In some jurisdictions, schools are required to conduct regular tornado drills, though generally less frequently than fire drills.

=== Tornado drills by state ===
In many states tornado drills are part of the Severe Weather Awareness Week.

- Alabama
- Florida
- Indiana
- Iowa
- Ohio
- Minnesota
- Missouri
- South Dakota
- Texas
- Virginia
- Wisconsin
- North Carolina

== Lockdown drills ==
Lockdown drills are means of practicing preparedness in a business or school in the event of an intruder or criminal act. Generally an announcement is given that the building is going on an immediate lockdown. At that point, all occupants present at the time of the drill go to a room and lock all doors and windows tight. They must remain still until an "all-clear signal" has been issued. If the emergency is really life-threatening, then occupants present at the time of the emergency will evacuate to a meeting zone well away from the premises (scene of the emergency).

== Earthquake drill ==
An earthquake drill is a drill used to practice in preparation for an earthquake. Schools in some areas conduct earthquake drills. Stop, drop and hold on is used during the drill. School Safety Preparedness Drill (SSPD) is an annual earthquake preparedness drill being organised in schools of North and North Eastern states of India commemorating 4 April 1905 Kangra earthquake.

Two non-governmental organisations, GeoHazards Society (GHS) and GeoHazards International (GHI), have been working for earthquake safety in South Asia for many years. In the year 2009 both the organisations along with Library of Tibetan Works and Archives together decided to mark the most destructive Kangra earthquake at Dharamshala in India. Considering the vulnerability of the school children in one of the most earthquake prone region of the world a School Safety Preparedness Drill was organised in the Tibetan schools along the Himalayas in India at 11:00 morning. About 7,500 children participated in the first ever such kind of a drill in India on 4 April 2009 in 25 Tibetan schools.

During the drill the schools prepare for an earthquake scenario and when the shaking starts the children along with staff perform a Drop Cover Hold on under sturdy tables and desks preparing to save themselves from falling objects. When the shaking stops everybody evacuates to a pre-designated assembly area followed by a debriefing.

With every passing year the drill started expanding to new areas covering more children both at Tibetan and non-Tibetan schools. In the 5th SSPD in 2013 more than 50,000 children participated in 162 schools in North and North East Indian states. Moreover, one school from Bhutan and another from Mandalay in Myanmar also participated in that drill. with participation of more than 725,000 children in 1100 schools.
