= 1980 Nepal earthquake =

1980 earthquake in the Nepal–India border

- Location within Nepal
- UTC time: 1980-07-29 14:58:40
- ISC event: 642643
- USGS-ANSS: ComCat
- Local date: 29 July 1980
- Local time: 20:28:40
- Duration: 20 seconds
- Magnitude: 6.6 M_{w}
- Depth: 15.0 km (9 mi)
- Epicenter: 29.58°N 81.05°E
- Fault: Main Himalayan Thrust
- Type: Reverse
- Areas affected: Uttarakhand & Nepal
- Total damage: $ 245 million`
- Max. intensity: MMI VIII (Severe)
- Foreshocks: 5.7 mb
- Casualties: 200 dead, 5,600 injured

The 1980 Nepal earthquake devastated the Nepal–India border region on the evening of July 29. The epicenter of the 6.6 M_{w} earthquake was located in Nepal, northwest of Khaptad National Park. At least 200 people died and 5,600 were injured in the disaster. Extensive damage occurred on both sides of the border, amounting to 245 million USD (828.9 million in 2022).

== Tectonic setting ==
The Himalaya is located at the convergent boundary where active convergence leads to continental collision. The India and Eurasian plates began colliding approximately 50 million years ago when the Tethys Ocean closed. The Main Himalayan Thrust (MHT), a decollement structure, defines the boundary between the Indian plate and Eurasian plate. The convergent zone also contains three other major faults; the Main Boundary Thrust (MBT), Main Central Thrust (MCT) and South Tibetan Detachment (STD). At the surface, the Main Himalayan Thrust propagates along the Main Frontal Thrust. These faults runs for approximately 2,300 km in an east–west direction, parallel to the southern foothills of the Lower Himalayan Range from Assam, through Nepal, and into Pakistan. This major thrust fault dips to the north, beneath the Himalaya at a shallow angle. It is the source of most of Himalayan earthquakes.

Earthquakes on the convergent boundary are megathrust events that repeat every few centuries. Large Himalayan earthquakes including those in 1505, 1934 and 1950 with magnitudes of 8.0 to 8.9 were the result of rupturing the MHT. These events generated surface ruptures by breaching the surface via the Main Frontal Thrust. The Uttarakhand and west Nepal segment of the MHT was responsible for the M_{w} 7.8 1803 Garhwal earthquake as well as two smaller but deadly events in 1991 and 1999. Deadly earthquakes occurred in 1966, and an M_{w} 7.0 struck the same region in 1916.

== Earthquake ==
The earthquake occurred as the result of shallow thrust faulting on the MHT boundary fault, between the MCT and the MBT. The rupture mechanism occurred on two separate fault planes; the latter corresponding to thrust faulting. A small right-lateral strike-slip component was measured as well.

== Damage and casualties ==
The mainshock was preceded by a strong 5.7 mb foreshock almost three hours prior. Severe shaking lasted 20 seconds during the mainshock. The death toll would have been higher if not for the foreshock which had residents on high alert, and driven them out of their homes.

A total of 13,258 homes were destroyed, making at least 30,000 homeless. The greatest damage was situated in a narrow zone between northwest Darchula and southeast Bajhang. An inspection after the earthquake found that tall buildings were the most damaged. Houses with heavy roofs made of slate were also found to be greatly affected. The report concluded that weak foundations and haphazard construction practices were responsible for the extensive damage observed.

In the village of Moribagad, damage was minimal. The limited damage was, according to residents, because they followed the rules of their goddess. The rule stated that residents must not build a house with more than two floors, as a middle floor is forbidden. The next rule forbids slate roofs which were heavy, hence residents constructed lightweight thatch roofs.

The Mahakali and Seti Zones suffered major impacts. Three districts in the zone; Bajhang, Baitadi, and Bajura were the most affected. Up to 40 people died in the districts and 2,000 were injured. An additional 5,000 families were left without homes.

Several major towns in Darchula District were obliterated. At least 90 schools were totally destroyed in Bajhang. The Rastriya Samachar Samiti (RSS) reported 12 district official and 21 village buildings, as well as 65 temples were also destroyed. The cost of damage in the district was $10.3 million. Telecommunication services were affected, as did army barracks and police stations suffer damage. The earthquake occurred during the monsoon season which further affected communications and transport services in the aftermath due to landslides.

== See also ==
- List of earthquakes in 1980
- List of earthquakes in Nepal
- List of earthquakes in India
