= Main Himalayan Thrust =

Geological feature

- Location: Himalayas

Characteristics
- Length: >2,000km
- Strike: northwest-southeast

Tectonics
- Status: Active
- Type: Thrust fault

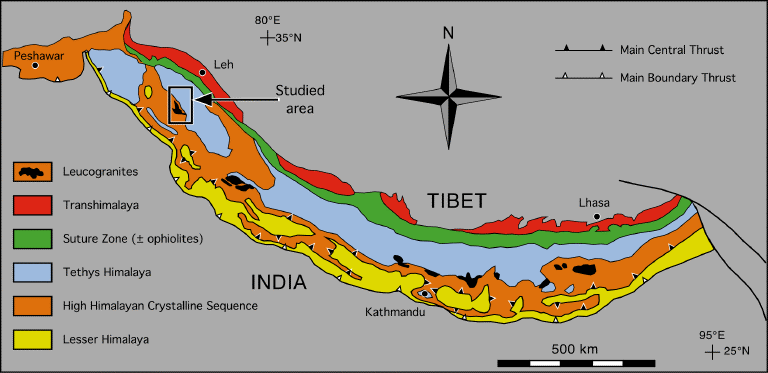
A geological map of the Himalaya region. The Main Himalayan Thrust underlies the rock units.

Diagram showing a décollement

The Main Himalayan Thrust (MHT) is a décollement under the Himalaya Range. This thrust fault follows a northwest-southeast strike, reminiscent of an arc, and gently dips about 10 degrees towards the north, beneath the region. It is the largest active continental megathrust fault in the world.

== Overview ==
The MHT accommodates crustal shortening of India and Eurasia as a result of the ongoing collision between the Indian and Eurasian plates. The MHT absorbs around 20mm/yr of slip, nearly half of the total convergence rate. This slip can be released from small-scale earthquakes and some plastic deformation, but the MHT still accumulates a deficit of moment of 6.6×10^{19} Nm/yr. The MHT also remains locked with the overlying Eurasian plate from its surface expression to the front of the higher Himalayas, nearly 100 kilometres away. This locking mechanism combined with the rapid accumulation of deficit of moment are concerning, as some professionals estimate that earthquakes up to the size of 8.9 on the Richter scale could be in order for regions such as western Nepal. Earthquakes of this magnitude are estimated to have a return period of over 1000 years in this region. Deformation of the crust is also accommodated along splay structures including the Main Frontal Thrust (MFT), Main Boundary Thrust (MBT), Main Central Thrust (MCT), and possibly the South Tibetan Detachment. The MHT is the root detachment of these splays. Currently, the MFT and MHT accounts for almost the entire rate of convergence (15–21 mm/yr). This fault defines where the Indian subcontinent is underthrust beneath the Himalayan orogenic wedge.

== Geometry ==
The MHT is a large north-dipping detachment fault separating the northern boundary of the Indian plate and southern boundary of the Himalayas. It is a gently sloping decollement that is predominantly subhorizontal, but its dip angle varies along strike and regions, and different research propose contradicting results. The MHT generally extends north towards southern Tibet, where it reaches a depth of 40 km (25 mi). In some sections, the MHT features a flat-ramp-flat geometry due to the presence of a midcrustal ramp beneath the High Himalayas before it resumes its subhorizontal dip beneath the Tethys Himalaya in southern Tibet.

Along the Bhutan section, Xavier Robert and others proposed that the MHT has a dip of 5–7° with limited variability along strike. However, Isabelle Coutand and others postulated that the MHT was a complex structure using thermochronology that features a flat-ramp-flat configuration with significant variability along strike. They inferred that the MHT at the surface (known as the Main Frontal Thrust (MFT)) is a steep frontal ramp that extends into a flat planar surface at 10–15 km (6.2–9.3 mi) before encountering a 30° ramp at depth. The midcrustal ramp is also found in the Garhwal, Nepal, and Sikkim Himalaya, where its reaches a maximum steepness of 40°.

Beneath the Garhwal Himalayas, a flat-ramp-flat geometry is also inferred north of the surface expression of the MHT. The shallower flat, dipping north at 2°, occurs at a 10 km (6.2 mi) below sea level. It connects with a northeast dipping 16° ramp at about 100 km (62 mi) north of the MFT, where the Lesser Himalayas transitions to the High Himalayas. This ramp occurs at 10–20 km (6.2–12.4 mi) depth before it connects to a deeper flat. The deeper flat dips 4° north at 20–25 km (12–16 mi) depth.

In Gorkha District of central Nepal, at the site of the 2015 earthquakes, the MHT features a flat-ramp-flat-ramp-flat geometry, where a middle and deeper ramp bound a flat middle segment of the MHT that ruptured. The area where more than a meter of displacement occurred during the earthquake was consistent with the elliptical shape (about 100 by 50 km (62 by 31 mi) across) of this subhorizontal fault segment isolated from other parts of the MHT by these ramps. Beyond the 2015 rupture patch, both ramps combine to form a larger ramp which is prominent as it extends eastwards. To the west of this zone, after middle and deeper ramps combine, they diverge again, to form another flat-ramp-flat-ramp-flat feature. This flat middle segment is larger; extending 400 km (250 mi) westwards.

The MHT emerges towards the surface at depth on its gently sloping plane via a splay fault. Its surface expression in the northern Gangetic Plain is represented by the Main Frontal Thrust (MFT). The MFT is the southernmost and youngest thrust structure of the greater Himalayan fold and thrust belt. At Bardibas, southern Nepal, the MHT lies horizontally at a depth of 2 km (1.2 mi); emerging steeply towards the surface as two local splay faults, the Patu and Bardibas thrust.

In Jammu and Kashmir of the northwestern Himalayas, the arc geometry of the plate boundary causes the MHT to dip in a northeast direction. The MHT maintains a gently-sloping subhorizontal thrust structure. Beneath the Kashmir Valley, seismic imaging has revealed a flat decollement at 12–16 km (7.5–9.9 mi) depth. The 4° decollement is also present beneath the Sub- and Lesser Himalayas of Jammu and Kashmir. Further northeast towards the Kishtwar Himalaya and Zanskar Range, the MHT forms a 13–17° dipping midcrustal ramp at 10–16 km (6.2–9.9 mi) depth.

== Seismic hazard ==
The MHT is a known hazard and potential source for large earthquakes of magnitude 8.0 or greater. The MHT is also associated with other large 20th-century earthquakes such as the 1934 Nepal–India earthquake and the 1950 Assam–Tibet earthquake. Within the last thousand years, multiple earthquakes have occurred with magnitudes of at least M_{w}8.0 as deduced by paleoseismology. Michel et al. (2021) suggested the maximum magnitude possible on the MHT to be M_{w}8.7 with a recurrence interval of 200 years.

In April 2015, a section of the MHT produced a blind rupture earthquake, killing nearly 9,000 people. Researchers who published their findings in Nature Geoscience revealed that the M_{w}7.8 earthquake failed to rupture towards the surface, thus still leaving the possibility of future large earthquakes. Since the rupture ceased 11 km (6.8 mi) beneath the Kathmandu region, a shallow section of the MHT south of the region remains unruptured and could produce an earthquake of comparable size. The research lead, J. R. Elliott, says such an earthquake could be more devastating because of its shallowness.

The Kashmir seismic gap spans 200 km (120 mi) between the rupture areas of the 1905 Kangra earthquake southeast of the Kashmir Valley and the 2005 Kashmir earthquake to the northwest. From paleoseismology along this section, the estimated recurrence interval for major earthquakes was 500 to 700 years, noting that the last event of comparable size was the 1555 Kashmir earthquake (M_{w} 7.6−8.2). On the basis of seismic coupling (the portion of fault strain that is released as an earthquake), the recurrence interval range from 500 to 2,000 years for M_{w} 8.51–8.76 events.

== Earthquakes ==
The Main Himalayan Thrust and its splay branches has been the source of numerous earthquakes, including some that are indirectly related.

Date	Country	Magnitude	Depth (km)	MMI	Deaths	Comments	Source
1255-06-07	Nepal	8.0+	-			Rupture length uncertain but possibly in the hundreds of kilometers. Killed one-third of Nepal(Kathmandu Valley)'s population.	
1344-09-14	Nepal		-				
1408	Nepal		-				
1505-06-06	Nepal, India and China	8.2–8.8	-			Killed 30% of the Nepalese population.	
1555-09-01	Kashmir	7.6–8.0	-				
1680	Nepal	<7.5	-				
1714-05-4	Bhutan	7.6–8.6	-	IX	"Many"	Ruptured the whole Bhutan section of the Main Frontal Thrust.	
1803-09-01	India	7.8–7.9	-	IX	300	Damage as far as New Delhi.	
1833-08-26	Nepal	7.5–7.9	-	IX	500	Severely damaged Kathmandu and was felt as far as Calcutta.	
1905-04-04	India	7.9	-	X	20,000+		
1934-01-05	Nepal and India	8.1	15.0	XI	12,000	Ruptured to the surface via the Main Frontal Thrust.	
1947-07-29	China	7.3	20.0	V			
1950-08-15	India, China and Myanmar	8.6	15.0	XI	4,800	Ranks among the largest Strike-slip earthquake ever instrumentally recorded.	
1966-06-27	Nepal and India	6.1	37.0		80		
1980-07-29	Nepal and India	6.5	17.5	VIII	200		
1988-08-21	Nepal	6.9	57.4	VIII	700-1400		
1991-10-20	India	6.8	10.3	IX	2000	Main Central Thrust.	
1999-03-29	India	6.8	21.0	VII	103		
2005-10-08	Pakistan	7.6	26.0	XI	87,400		
2009-09-21	Bhutan	6.1	14.0	VI	11		
2011-09-18	India	6.9	50.0	VII	111	Intraplate strike-slip.	
2013-05-01	Pakistan and India	5.7	15.0	VII	1	Additional 59 injured.	
2015-04-25	Nepal	7.8	8.2	VIII	8,964		
2015-05-12	Nepal	7.3	18.5	VIII	218	Aftershock of the April 2015 earthquake.	
2015-07-24	Pakistan	5.1	17.0	V	3		
2019-09-24	Pakistan	6.0	10.0	VII	40		

== See also ==
- Geology of the Himalaya
