= 1714 Bhutan earthquake =

Seismic event

- Location within India
- Local date: 4 May 1714
- Local time: At night
- Magnitude: 8.1±0.5 M_{w}
- Epicenter: 27°N 90°E location approximate
- Fault: Main Frontal Thrust
- Type: Megathrust
- Areas affected: Bhutan, India
- Max. intensity: MMI IX (Violent)
- Casualties: "Many"

Bhutan was struck by a major earthquake on 4 May 1714. It had an estimated magnitude of about 8.1 M_{w} and caused shaking that reached IX (Violent) on the Modified Mercalli intensity scale. It is thought to have been caused by rupture of the Bhutan part of the Main Frontal Thrust. Damage was reported from west central Bhutan and northeast India. The earthquake resulted in "many fatalities".

== Tectonic setting ==
Bhutan lies across the southern margin of the Himalayas. This mountain belt, and the Tibetan Plateau that lies north of it, is the result of the ongoing collision of the Indian Plate with the Eurasian Plate. The main active structures on the margin are a series of major thrust faults. The basal thrust is known as the Main Himalayan Thrust (MHT) which links directly northwards into the plate boundary and forms the décollement for the whole thrust system. The southernmost thrust that reaches the surface is the Main Frontal Thrust (MFT), which joins with the MHT at depth. Other shallower thrusts also branch (splay) off the MHT, including the Main Central Thrust and the Main Boundary Thrust. All of these thrusts are capable of producing large and damaging earthquakes. The April 2015 Nepal earthquake is the most recent such event, which ruptured the MHT.

== Earthquake ==
Earlier work on this event gave the year as 1713, but the discovery of more records strongly suggested that the earthquake occurred in 1714. This is supported by records of the event in northeastern India, stating that it occurred shortly before the death of King Rudra Singh in August 1714.

The magnitude and location of the earthquake have been estimated using seismic intensities taken from damage records in both Bhutan and India. Further information has come from paleoseismological investigations of trenches dug across the Main Frontal Thrust. Evidence for surface rupture during this earthquake has been found at three sites along the outcrop of the MFT in Bhutan. The largest observed displacement attributed to this event was about 11 m at a site near Samdrup Jongkhar, close to the Bhutan-India border. The magnitude is estimated to lie in the range 7.6–8.6 M_{w}. The length of the rupture along the mountain front is estimated to be a minimum of 175 km and probably as much as 290 km.

Thirty aftershocks were reported on the same day as the earthquake, with more occurring over the following month.

== Damage ==
The effects of this earthquake were recorded in the writings of the Chief Abbot, Shakya Rinchen, who experienced the event as a four-year-old. Intensities have been estimated from his descriptions at three locations, Wangdue Phodrang, the Punakha valley and the Thimphu valley. The Gangteng Monastery in Phobjikha Valley was also severely damaged. There are records of damage reported from northeastern India at three locations, Tingkhong, Charaideo and Garhgaon. The only description of the resulting death toll is "many fatalities".
