= Brian Tucker (seismologist) =

American seismologist

- Education: Scripps Institution of Oceanography, University of California, San Diego (Ph.D.); John F. Kennedy School of Government, Harvard University (M.A.); Pomona College (B.A.)
- Awards: Gorakha Dakshin Bahu Award 2001; MacArthur Fellows Program 2002; U.S. Civilian Research & Development Foundation George Brown Award for International Science and Technology Cooperation 2007
- Scientific career
- Fields: Seismology
- Workplaces: GeoHazards International; California Geological Survey
- Website: geohaz.org

Brian E. Tucker is an American seismologist specializing in disaster prevention. He is also the founder of GeoHazards International (GHI), a non-profit dedicated to ending preventable death and suffering caused by natural disasters in the world’s most vulnerable communities.

== Life ==
Tucker received a Ph.D. in Earth Sciences from the Scripps Institution of Oceanography at the University of California, San Diego, an M.A. in Public Policy from the John F. Kennedy School of Government at Harvard University, and a B.A. in Physics from Pomona College.

Tucker advocates for the creation of self-reliant communities that can continue their economic, political and cultural development unimpeded by natural disasters. Tucker has written or edited three books to raise awareness of geologic threats to communities

== Career ==
After observing the tragic consequences of an earthquake in Tajikistan in 1991, Tucker founded GeoHazards International (GHI), a Menlo Park, California-based nonprofit organization focused on working with the world’s most vulnerable people to develop and deploy preventative solutions that are known to save lives. GHI works through a global network of people dedicated to reducing the risks of death and injury caused by earthquakes and other natural disasters in needy, at-risk countries by sharing and promoting civil engineering principles and connecting local experts, engineers, scientists, and government officials with their counterparts abroad. Through their work, GHI works to bring risk-mitigation techniques that are common in developed countries, but often unused in developing countries, and adapt the techniques to fit within the social, political, and economic constraints in some of the most at-risk communities in the world.

In the aftermath of the April 2015 Nepal earthquake, its May aftershock, and other later aftershocks, Tucker was interviewed by numerous media outlets to discuss the lessons that geoscientists, local and national politicians, decision makers, and the general public could learn from the earthquake. In the mid-1990s, GHI helped set up a local non-profit in the region, the National Society for Earthquake Technology-Nepal, and these organizations implemented a series of preventative measures many years before the earthquakes that saved an undetermined number of lives in the disaster. These included developing an earthquake scenario describing expected consequences on modern-day Kathmandu, forming an action plan with local stakeholders and international earthquake professionals to reduce the consequences outlined in the scenario, establishing demonstration projects (including the inauguration of an annual Nepal Earthquake Safety Day held each year on January 15), and seismically retrofitting schools while training local masons.

Prior to his work with GHI, Tucker served as the acting state geologist, principal state geologist and supervising geologist of the California Geological Survey between 1982 and 1991. He served on the board of directors of the Seismological Society of America and the World Seismic Safety Initiative (WSSI).

== Awards ==
Tucker received the 2001 Gorakha Dakshin Bahu Award for service to the people of Nepal by the King of Nepal and was named a MacArthur Fellow in 2002 by the John D. and Catherine T. MacArthur Foundation. In 2007, Tucker was named a Fellow of the California Academy of Sciences. Also that year, he received the George Brown Award for International Scientific Cooperation from the U.S. Civilian Research & Development Foundation. In 2009, he was named one of UC San Diego's 100 Influential Alumni.
