= School Safety Preparedness Drill =

Earthquake preparedness drill

School Safety Preparedness Drill (SSPD) is an annual earthquake preparedness drill being organised in schools of North and North Eastern states of India commemorating 4 April 1905 Kangra earthquake.

The two non-governmental organisations GeoHazards Society (GHS) and GeoHazards International (GHI) has been working for earthquake safety in South Asia for many years. In the year 2009 both the organisations along with Library of Tibetan Works and Archives together decided to mark the most destructive Kangra earthquake at Dharamshala in India. Considering the vulnerability of the school children in one of the most earthquake prone region of the world a School Safety Preparedness Drill was organised in the Tibetan schools along the Himalayas in India at 11:00 morning. About 7,500 children participated in the first ever such kind of a drill in India on 4 April 2009 in 25 Tibetan schools.

During the SSPD the schools prepare for an earthquake scenario and when the shaking starts the children along with staff perform a Drop Cover Hold on under sturdy tables and desks preparing to save themselves from falling objects.

In order to prevent complacency among the children if the earthquake was small, the teachers will instead shake the children’s desks to emulate a real earthquake. This has led to some injuries of children.

When the shaking stops everybody evacuates to a pre-designated assembly area followed by a debriefing.

With every passing year the drill started expanding to new areas covering more children both at Tibetan and non-Tibetan schools. In the 5th SSPD in 2013 more than 50,000 children participated in 162 schools in North and North East Indian states. Moreover, one school from Bhutan and another from Mandalay in Myanmar also participated in that drill. Last year in 2014 the turnout was phenomenal with participation of more than 725,000 children in 1100 schools.
