= 2011 Sikkim earthquake =

Magnitude 6.9 earthquake near the India-Nepal border

- Location within India Location within Nepal
- UTC time: 2011-09-18 12:40:51
- ISC event: 17238846
- USGS-ANSS: ComCat
- Local date: 18 September 2011
- Local time: 18:10 IST 18:25 NPT 18:40 BTT 20:40 CST
- Duration: 30–40 seconds
- Magnitude: 6.9 M_{w}
- Depth: 19.7 km (12.2 mi)
- Epicenter: Taplejung, Nepal; 27.723°N 88.064°E
- Type: Intraplate
- Areas affected: India; Bangladesh; Nepal; Bhutan; China
- Total damage: $22.3 billion USD
- Max. intensity: MMI VII (Very strong)
- Landslides: Yes
- Aftershocks: Yes
- Casualties: At least 111 killed

The 2011 Sikkim earthquake (also known as the 2011 Himalayan earthquake) occurred with a moment magnitude of 6.9 and was centered within the Kanchenjunga Conservation Area, near the border of Nepal and the Indian state of Sikkim, at 18:10 IST on Sunday, 18 September. The earthquake was felt across northeastern India, Nepal, Bhutan, Bangladesh, and southern Tibet.

At least 111 people were killed in the earthquake. Most of the deaths occurred in Sikkim, with reports of fatalities in and near Singtam in the East Sikkim district. Several buildings collapsed in Gangtok. Eleven are reported dead in Nepal, including three killed when a wall collapsed in the British Embassy in Kathmandu. Elsewhere, structural damage occurred in Bangladesh, Bhutan, and across Tibet; another seven fatalities were confirmed in the latter region.

The quake came just a few days after an earthquake of 4.2 magnitude hit Haryana's Sonipat district, sending tremors in New Delhi. The earthquake was the fourth significant earthquake in India in September 2011.

Exactly a year after the original earthquake at 5:55 pm on 18 September 2012, another earthquake of magnitude 4.1 struck Sikkim, sparking panic among the people observing the anniversary of the original quake.

== Earthquake ==
The magnitude 6.9 (M_{w}) earthquake occurred inland at 18:10 IST on 18 September 2011, about 68 km (42 mi) northwest of Gangtok, Sikkim, at a shallow depth of 19.7 km (12.2 mi). At this location, the continental Indian and Eurasian plates converge with one another along a tectonic boundary beneath the mountainous region of northeast India near the Nepalese border. Although earthquakes in this region are usually interplate in nature, preliminary data suggests the Sikkim earthquake was triggered by shallow strike-slip faulting from an intraplate source within the over-riding Eurasian plate. Initial analyses also indicate a complex origin, with the perceived tremor likely being a result of two separate events occurring close together in time at similar focal depths.

=== Intensity ===
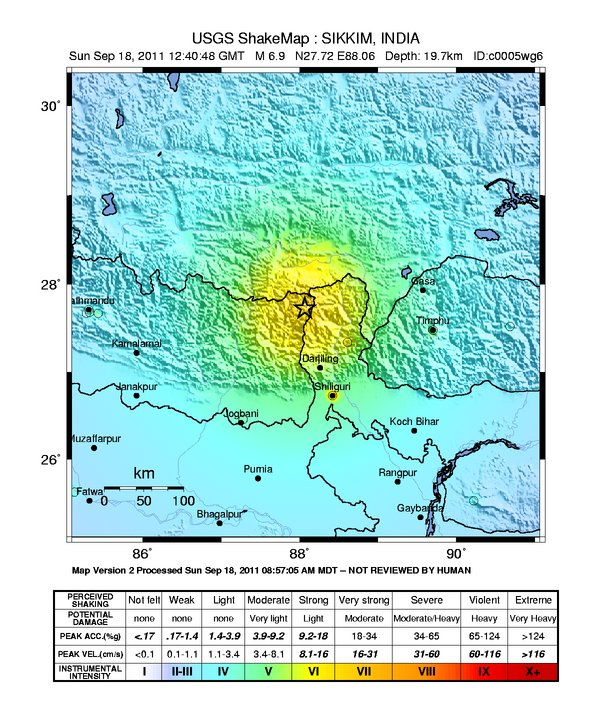
USGS ShakeMap for the event

Located at a shallow depth beneath the surface, the earthquake caused strong shaking in many areas adjacent to its epicenter reportedly lasting 30–40 seconds. The strongest shaking occurred to the west in Gangtok and further south in Siliguri, although similar ground motions registering at VI (Strong) on the Modified Mercalli intensity scale were recorded in many smaller towns such as Mangan across elevated regions. Lighter tremors (IV–III) spread southward through populous regions, with these motions reported in the Patna capital of Bihar and as far southwest as Bihar Sharif. Tremors were felt in Assam, Meghalaya, Tripura, parts of West Bengal, Bihar, Jharkhand, Uttar Pradesh, Rajasthan, Chandigarh, and Delhi states of India. In Tibet, the earthquake was felt in Shigatse and Lhasa. In all, the earthquake was felt in Nepal, India, Bhutan, Bangladesh, and China.

=== Aftershocks ===
Sikkim experienced three aftershocks within a span of 30 minutes after the mainshock occurred with magnitudes (M_{w}) of 5.7, 5.1, and 4.6. Kathmandu experienced two aftershocks that both had a magnitude of 4.8 M_{w}. The aftershocks had no serious impact in the region. At least 20 aftershocks back-to-back throughout the night caused panic in Gangtok.

== Impact ==
Casualties by country
Country	Deaths
India	97
China	7
Nepal	6
Bhutan	0
Bangladesh	0
Total	111

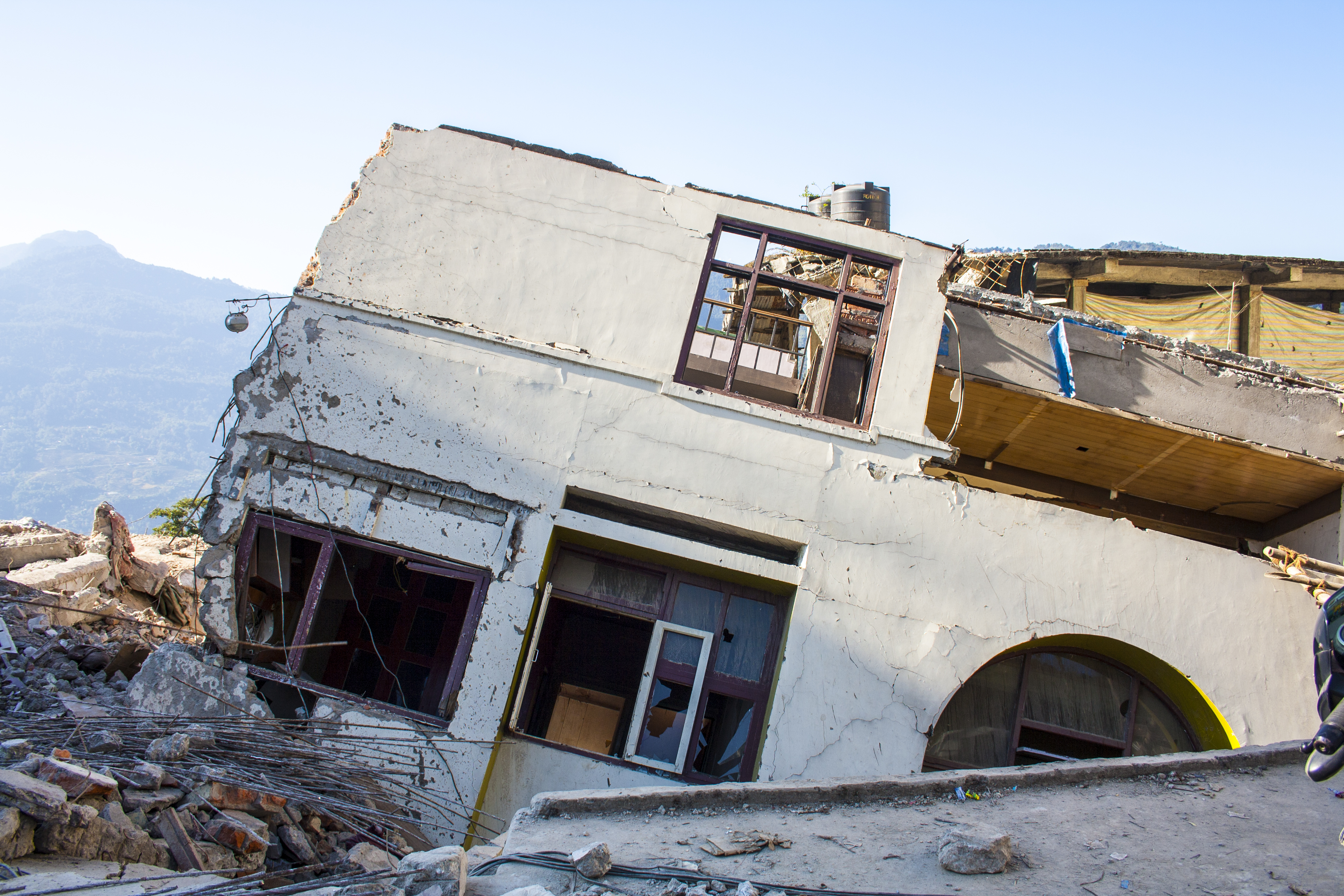
Demolished Building in Gangtok, Sikkim

The earthquake struck near a mountainous, albeit very populous, region near the Sikkim–Nepal border; most of the structures were highly vulnerable to earthquake shaking. Upon impact, tens of thousands of residents evacuated their homes, and many areas suffered from communication and power outages. The strong shaking caused significant building collapse and mudslides; at least 111 people were confirmed killed and hundreds sustained injuries from the effects of the earthquake. As the earthquake occurred during the monsoon season, heavy rain and landslides made rescue work increasingly difficult.

=== India ===
Northern India suffered the worst from the earthquake, with at least 75 people killed. Sixty people were reportedly killed in Sikkim alone. At least seven people died in Bihar, while six deaths have been reported in West Bengal. Power supply was disrupted in areas near Sikkim, including Kalimpong of Darjeeling district, and adjoining Jalpaiguri and Cooch Behar districts; the outages were in part blamed on an affected electric substation in Siliguri. Water supply was interrupted in Sikkim. National Highway 31, the major highway linking Sikkim to the rest of India, was damaged. Ten of the dead were workers at a hydroelectric project on the Teesta River.

In India, the total property damage is estimated to be around $22.3 billion USD, making it one of the costliest natural disasters in Indian history.

==== Sikkim ====
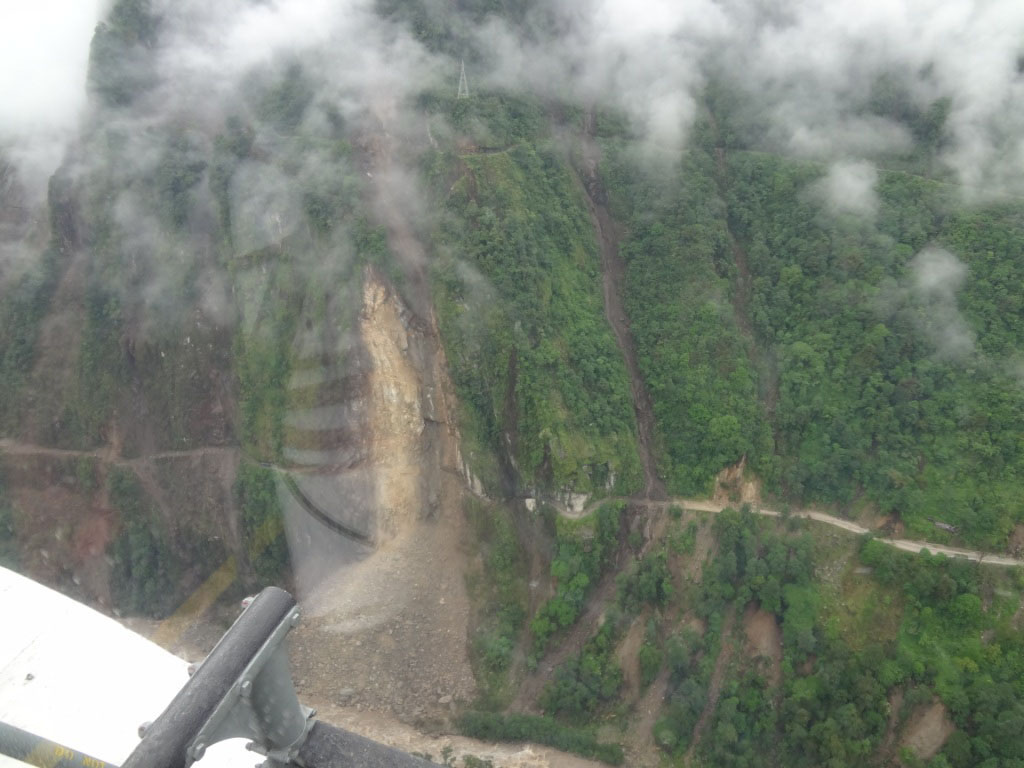
Sikkim earthquake aerial survey by Indian Air Force helicopter

Two buildings of the Indo-Tibetan Border Police in the Pegong areas of North Sikkim collapsed. In Gangtok, many government offices and hospitals were left unusable. The heavy shaking destroyed the villages of Lingzya, Sakyong, Pentong, Bay, and Tholong.

=== Nepal ===
In the capital city of Nepal, Kathmandu, damage from the earthquake was comparatively limited. Three people were killed when a wall at the British Embassy collapsed, and many others suffered injuries. The shaking effects were more severe in eastern Nepal, closer to the epicenter. There, hundreds of homes sustained significant damage, and due to saturated soil from preceding heavy rains, widespread mudslides impacted the region. Sunsari experienced power and telephone communication outages. Two people were killed in the eastern city of Dharan. Overall, in Nepal, 6 people died due to the earthquake.

=== Bangladesh ===
The earthquake was felt most strongly in northern Bangladesh. The quake was also felt in Dhaka, Rajshahi, Sylhet, Mymensingh, Barisal, Faridpur, Jessore, Khulna, Pabna, Bogra, Comilla, Noakhali, Chittagong and as far as Cox's Bazar. Panicked people rushed out of their homes and offices, but the only damage seems to be tilted and cracked buildings; no casualties were reported. Cell phone lines were also down for a few minutes during the quake.

=== China ===
In Tibet, building collapse was reported in Yadong, Dinggyê, and Gamba. At least seven people were reported dead in Yadong. Telephone service was interrupted in the seat of Yadong County. At least 70% of buildings in Yadong were deemed unstable.

=== Bhutan ===
There were no reports of casualties in Bhutan, although cracks in walls and ceilings of houses were reported in Wangthangkha village, Lango, and in the town area of Paro. There were also reports of a landslide right after crossing the Isuna Bridge from Paro towards Thimphu, and falling boulders after crossing Chundzom Bridge. Citizens were asked to avoid traveling on the Paro-Thimphu highway. Telecommunications networks were disrupted, with cellular networks unavailable after the quake.

Prime Minister of Bhutan Jigmi Thinley updated his status as "Phone lines remains clogged reflecting our caring and close knit society. No damage reported from East Bhutan. Four road blocks caused by falling debris are reported on the Chukha–Phuntsholing road. Two homes in Haa report damage with three to four people having suffered minor injury. Thimphu Dzong has sustained some cracks in the Utse and one of the four corner towers. Occupants have been moved out to safer parts. Please remain calm and alert."

== Rescue operations and compensation ==
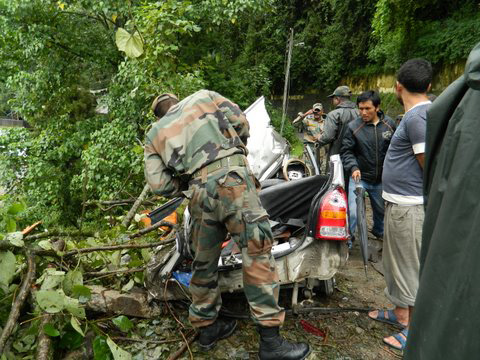
Army's rescue operations in earthquake affected area of Sikkim

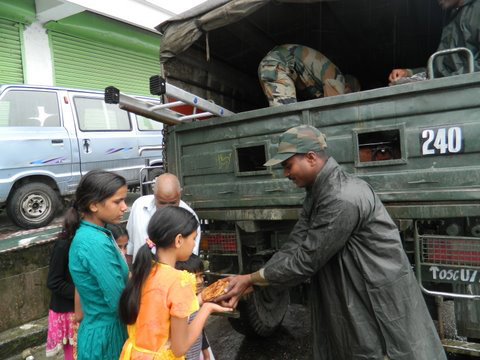
Army personnel distributing relief material to the people in earthquake affected area of Sikkim

=== India ===
Early rescue operations included four teams of the National Disaster Response Force being rushed to Sikkim, and five more teams were being sent from Kolkata. However, South and West Sikkim remained inaccessible, delaying rescue operations owing to landslides caused by rainfall. A group of 14 tourists was rescued by the army from north Sikkim. The army had deployed 72 columns, including infantry troops, combat engineers, four Dhruv and five Cheetah helicopters. Rain and landslides had hampered the rescue efforts of workers searching for survivors. Three hundred people, mostly labourers, were given shelter in Chungthang Gurdwara. Food was prepared in the gurdwara langar, with more than 600 hot meals at all meal times.

Indian former Prime Minister Dr. Manmohan Singh, on 19 September, announced ₹200,000 (US$2,100) as ex-gratia to a family member of those killed in the earthquake and ₹100,000 (US$1,100) for seriously injured. ₹50,000 (US$530) for those grievously injured and ₹25,000 (US$270) for those with minor injuries was announced by Sikkim's former chief minister Pawan Chamling. Rescue and relief operations resumed in Sikkim early in the morning on Tuesday with the weather showing signs of improvement. Road opening parties succeeded in restoring communication along NH31A, and work was continuing to repair the North Sikkim Highway to Mangan and Chungthang. Fifteen helicopters were pressed into service to evacuate casualties and deploy rescue and relief columns in the affected areas of north and west Sikkim.

Lt Gen Bikram Singh, GOC-in-C, Eastern Command, also visited the earthquake-affected areas and met his senior staff officers to discuss the progress of Operation Trishakti Madad, the massive operation launched by the Army's 33 Corps to provide relief to those affected by Sunday's earthquake.

According to the Army, nearly 2,000 civilians are being provided shelter at eight Army relief camps at Gangtok, Chungthang, Pegong, and Darjeeling. There are 400 others who have sought shelter at relief camps set up by the Indo-Tibetan Border Police. Several children from these camps even returned home on Tuesday and attended school.

On Monday, when the weather improved, Special Forces personnel slithered from helicopters into affected villages. Medical camps were set up, and arrangements were made for casualty evacuation.

21 engineering columns of the Army succeeded in restoring partial road connectivity to parts of north Sikkim on Tuesday. Telecommunications and power lines that snapped due to the earthquake were also restored.

In spite of all efforts, the highway to Gangtok remained badly affected due to landslides.

=== China ===
The People's Armed Police Border Defense Corps Yadong Battalion and Yadong Border Checkpoint deployed 90 personnel, 11 vehicles, and 30 tents to assist in disaster relief.

== See also ==
- List of earthquakes in 2011
- List of earthquakes in India
- List of earthquakes in Nepal
