= List of earthquakes in 1980 =

Earthquakes in 1980
Approximate epicenters of the earthquakes in 1980
- 4.0–5.9 magnitude
- 6.0–6.9 magnitude
- 7.0–7.9 magnitude
- 8.0+ magnitude
- Strongest magnitude: 7.7 M_{w} Solomon Islands
- Deadliest: 7.3 M_{w} Algeria; 5,000 deaths
- Total fatalities: 10,326

Number by magnitude
- 9.0+: 0
- 8.0–8.9: 0
- 7.0–7.9: 6
- 6.0–6.9: 90
- 5.0–5.9: 1,311
- 4.0–4.9: 3,410

This is a list of earthquakes in 1980. Only earthquakes of magnitude 6 or above are included, unless they result in damage and/or casualties, or are notable for some other reason. Events in remote areas will not be listed but included in statistics and maps. Countries are entered on the lists in order of their status in this particular year. All dates are listed according to UTC time. Maximum intensities are indicated on the Mercalli intensity scale and are sourced from United States Geological Survey (USGS) ShakeMap data. Although activity was once again below average, 1980 had several deadly events which helped the overall number of deaths surpass 10,000. The largest of just 6 magnitude 7.0+ events measured 7.7 and struck the Solomon Islands in July. The last quarter of the year had the bulk of the deaths. Algeria had its largest earthquake in October. The magnitude 7.3 event caused 5,000 deaths. A fortnight later Mexico suffered 300 lost lives. At the end of November southern Italy was struck by a magnitude 6.9 earthquake which led to nearly 4,700 deaths. Other areas experiencing deaths were Portugal and Nepal.

== By death toll ==
Rank	Death toll	Magnitude	Location	MMI	Depth (km)	Date
1	5,000	7.3	Algeria, Chlef Province	X (Extreme)	10.0	October 10
2	4,689	6.9	Italy, Campania	X (Extreme)	10.0	November 23
3	300	6.4	Mexico, Puebla	IX (Violent)	72.0	October 24
4	200	6.5	Nepal, Sudurpashchim Province	VIII (Severe)	18.0	July 29
5	73	6.7	Portugal, Azores	VIII (Severe)	10.0	January 1
6	26	5.8	Iran, Qom Province	VIII (Severe)	33.0	December 19
7	15	5.2	India, Jammu and Kashmir (union territory)	V (Moderate)	25.0	August 23

Listed are earthquakes with at least 10 dead.

== By magnitude ==
Rank	Magnitude	Death toll	Location	MMI	Depth (km)	Date
1	7.7	0	Solomon Islands, Santa Cruz Islands	VI (Strong)	33.0	July 17
2	7.5	0	Solomon Islands, Santa Cruz Islands	VII (Very strong)	33.0	July 8
3	7.3	5,000	Algeria, Chlef Province	X (Extreme)	10.0	October 10
= 4	7.2	0	France, southeast of Loyalty Islands, New Caledonia	( )	33.0	October 25
= 4	7.2	0	United States, off the coast of northern California	VIII (Severe)	19.0	November 8
5	7.0	0	Soviet Union, Kuril Islands, Russia	VII (Very strong)	44.0	February 23

Listed are earthquakes with at least 7.0 magnitude.

== By month ==
=== January ===
January
- Strongest magnitude: 6.7 M_{w} Portugal
- Deadliest: 6.7 M_{w} Portugal; 73 deaths
- Total fatalities: 73

Number by magnitude
- 8.0–8.9: 0
- 7.0–7.9: 0
- 6.0–6.9: 4
- 5.0–5.9: 126
- 4.0–4.9: 260

Date	Country and location	M_{w}	Depth (km)	MMI	Notes	Casualties	
Date	Country and location	M_{w}	Depth (km)	MMI	Notes	Dead	Injured
1	Portugal, Azores	6.7	10.0	VIII	The 1980 Azores Islands earthquake resulted in 69 deaths and 600 injuries. $5 million (1980 rate) in property damage was reported.	73	400
2	Philippines, off the south coast of Mindanao	6.0	63.0	VII			
24	United States, central California	5.8	11.0	VIII	The 1980 Livermore earthquake left 50 people injured and caused major damage. Damage reached $11.5 million (1980 rate). The Lawrence Livermore National Laboratory in particular was impacted by the shaking.		50

=== February ===
February
- Strongest magnitude: 7.0 M_{w} Soviet Union, Russia
- Total fatalities: 0

Number by magnitude
- 8.0–8.9: 0
- 7.0–7.9: 1
- 6.0–6.9: 8
- 5.0–5.9: 117
- 4.0–4.9: 262

Date	Country and location	M_{w}	Depth (km)	MMI	Notes	Casualties	
Date	Country and location	M_{w}	Depth (km)	MMI	Notes	Dead	Injured
7	Australia, north of Macquarie Island	6.5	10.0	VI			
13	China, Xinjiang Province	6.1	63.0	V			
22	China, Xizang Province	6.2	33.0	VIII			
23	Soviet Union, Kuril Islands, Russia	7.0	44.0	VII			
27	Papua New Guinea, West New Britain Province	6.6	53.0	VI			
29	Philippines, off the southeast coast of Mindanao	6.1	104.0	IV			

=== March ===
March
- Strongest magnitude: 6.9 M_{w} United States
- Total fatalities: 0

Number by magnitude
- 8.0–8.9: 0
- 7.0–7.9: 0
- 6.0–6.9: 8
- 5.0–5.9: 111
- 4.0–4.9: 365

Date	Country and location	M_{w}	Depth (km)	MMI	Notes	Casualties	
Date	Country and location	M_{w}	Depth (km)	MMI	Notes	Dead	Injured
8	France, southeast of Loyalty Islands, New Caledonia	6.7	38.0				
24	United States, Fox Islands (Alaska)	6.9	33.0	VI			
31	Philippines, Luzon	6.3	43.0	VI			

=== April ===
April
- Strongest magnitude: 6.7 M_{w} Fiji
- Total fatalities: 0

Number by magnitude
- 8.0–8.9: 0
- 7.0–7.9: 0
- 6.0–6.9: 5
- 5.0–5.9: 105
- 4.0–4.9: 358

Date	Country and location	M_{w}	Depth (km)	MMI	Notes	Casualties	
Date	Country and location	M_{w}	Depth (km)	MMI	Notes	Dead	Injured
13	Fiji, south of	6.7	79.0				
16	Indonesia, off the south coast of Java	5.8	84.0	V	Some damage was caused.		

=== May ===
May
- Strongest magnitude: 6.4 M_{w} Australia
- Total fatalities: 0

Number by magnitude
- 8.0–8.9: 0
- 7.0–7.9: 0
- 6.0–6.9: 11
- 5.0–5.9: 105
- 4.0–4.9: 398

Date	Country and location	M_{w}	Depth (km)	MMI	Notes	Casualties	
Date	Country and location	M_{w}	Depth (km)	MMI	Notes	Dead	Injured
4	Iran, Gilan Province	6.2	46.0	VII			
12	New Hebrides	6.1	20.0	VII			
14	Italy, Basilicata	4.5	24.0	VIII	Some damage was reported.		
18	Guatemala, Solola Department	5.3	105.0	IV	Some damage was reported.		
18	United States, Mount St. Helens, Washington (state)	5.7	1.5	VI	This event served as the catalyst for the 1980 eruption of Mount St. Helens. For weeks prior to this minor eruptions and earthquakes rattled the area. The catastrophic explosion which caused the destruction of the surrounding area occurred seconds after this earthquake.		
18	Yugoslavia, Rasina District, Serbia	5.8	9.0	VIII	30 people were injured and some damage was reported. Costs were $5 million (1980 rate).		30
25	United States, Long Valley Caldera, California	6.1	6.8	VIII	First in a series of large events over the coming days to affect the area. 7 people were injured and some damage was reported. Costs reached $1.5 million (1980 rate).		7
25	United States, Long Valley Caldera, California	6.0	6.7	VII			
25	United States, Long Valley Caldera, California	6.1	11.9	VII			
26	Chile, Tarapaca Region	6.1	114.0	V			
27	Tonga	6.1	33.0				
27	United States, Long Valley Caldera, California	6.2	13.8	VII			

=== June ===
June
- Strongest magnitude: 6.8 M_{w} Philippines
- Deadliest: 6.3 M_{w} Mexico; 1 death
- Total fatalities: 1

Number by magnitude
- 8.0–8.9: 0
- 7.0–7.9: 0
- 6.0–6.9: 12
- 5.0–5.9: 139
- 4.0–4.9: 280

Date	Country and location	M_{w}	Depth (km)	MMI	Notes	Casualties	
Date	Country and location	M_{w}	Depth (km)	MMI	Notes	Dead	Injured
9	Mexico, Baja California	6.3	6.0	IX	1 death was caused as well as 100 injuries. Some damage was reported.	1	100
9	Philippines, off the northeast coast of Mindanao	6.0	19.0	IV	Foreshock to June 18 event.		
18	Papua New Guinea, off the southeast coast of New Britain	6.0	61.0	VII	Foreshock of June 25 event.		
18	Tonga	6.5	43.0				
18	Philippines, off the northeast coast of Mindanao	6.8	54.0	VI			
25	Papua New Guinea, East New Britain Province	6.5	49.0	VI			
29	Japan, off the south coast of Honshu	6.2	15.0	VIII	7 people were hurt and some damage was caused.		7

=== July ===
July
- Strongest magnitude: 7.9 M_{w} Solomon Islands
- Deadliest: 6.5 M_{w} Nepal; 200 deaths
- Total fatalities: 203

Number by magnitude
- 8.0–8.9: 0
- 7.0–7.9: 2
- 6.0–6.9: 10
- 5.0–5.9: 123
- 4.0–4.9: 299

Date	Country and location	M_{w}	Depth (km)	MMI	Notes	Casualties	
Date	Country and location	M_{w}	Depth (km)	MMI	Notes	Dead	Injured
8	Solomon Islands, Santa Cruz Islands	7.5	33.0	VII	Foreshock to July 17 event. Some damage was caused.		
9	Greece, Thessaly	6.4	14.0	rowspan="2"| Doublet earthquake. 1 person was killed and at least 101 were injured. $5 million (1980 rate) in damage was reported.	1	101	
9	Greece, Thessaly	6.3	20.0	VI			
9	Solomon Islands, Santa Cruz Islands	6.7	33.0		Aftershock.		
11	Soviet Union, Sughd Region, Tajikistan	5.2	33.0	VI	Some damage was caused.		
12	Greece, Thessaly	4.0	10.0		Aftershock of July 9 events. 1 person was killed and 17 were injured. Damage costs were $5 million (1980 rate).	1	17
14	New Zealand, Kermadec Islands	6.6	49.0				
16	Papua New Guinea, East Sepik Province	6.5	84.0	VIII			
17	Solomon Islands, Santa Cruz Islands	7.7	33.0	VI	Largest event in 1980.		
19	Argentina, San Juan Province (Argentina)	6.1	110.0	IV			
22	Iran, Gilan Province	5.4	62.0	IV	1 person died and major damage was reported.	1	
27	United States, Kentucky	5.0	10.0	VI	Largest event in Kentucky's history. 2 people were injured and some property damage was caused. Costs reached $1 million (1980 rate).		2
29	Solomon Islands, Santa Cruz Islands	6.7	48.0	VI	Aftershock of July 17 event.		
29	Nepal, Sudurpashchim Province	6.5	18.0	VIII	200 people died and at least 101 were injured during the 1980 Nepal earthquake. Major property damage was caused with costs of $245 million (1980 rate).	200	5,600

=== August ===
August
- Strongest magnitude: 6.4 M_{w} Guatemala
- Deadliest: 5.2 M_{w} India; 15 deaths
- Total fatalities: 26

Number by magnitude
- 8.0–8.9: 0
- 7.0–7.9: 0
- 6.0–6.9: 4
- 5.0–5.9: 92
- 4.0–4.9: 230

Date	Country and location	M_{w}	Depth (km)	MMI	Notes	Casualties	
Date	Country and location	M_{w}	Depth (km)	MMI	Notes	Dead	Injured
2	Solomon Islands, Santa Cruz Islands	6.3	33.0	VI	Different location to previous events.		
9	Guatemala, Izabal Department	6.4	22.0	VII	2 deaths were caused by the 1980 Honduras earthquake. At least 101 injuries were caused. Some damage was caused.	2	101
18	Ecuador, Guayas Province	5.6	55.0	V	8 people were killed and 100 were injured. $5 million (1980 rate) in damage was caused.	8	100
23	India, Jammu and Kashmir (union territory)	5.2	25.0	rowspan="2"| Doublet earthquake with both events 14 minutes apart. At least 16 people were killed in total. 40 people were injured. Many homes were destroyed.	16	40	
23	India, Jammu and Kashmir (union territory)	5.2	33.0	IV			

=== September ===
September
- Strongest magnitude: 6.5 M_{w} Papua New Guinea
- Deadliest: 6.0 M_{w} Japan; 2 deaths
- Total fatalities: 2

Number by magnitude
- 8.0–8.9: 0
- 7.0–7.9: 0
- 6.0–6.9: 4
- 5.0–5.9: 86
- 4.0–4.9: 180

Date	Country and location	M_{w}	Depth (km)	MMI	Notes	Casualties	
Date	Country and location	M_{w}	Depth (km)	MMI	Notes	Dead	Injured
14	Soviet Union, East Kazakhstan Region, Kazakhstan	6.2	0.0		Nuclear test.		
24	Japan, Chiba Prefecture, Honshu	6.0	73.0	VI	2 people were killed and 73 were hurt. Costs of $1 million (1980 rate) in damage was reported.	2	73
26	Papua New Guinea, Sandaun Province	6.5	33.0	VI			
28	Papua New Guinea, off the west coast of Bougainville Island	6.0	68.0	V			

=== October ===
October
- Strongest magnitude: 7.3 M_{w} Algeria
- Deadliest: 7.3 M_{w} Algeria; 5,000 deaths
- Total fatalities: 5,300

Number by magnitude
- 8.0–8.9: 0
- 7.0–7.9: 2
- 6.0–6.9: 12
- 5.0–5.9: 111
- 4.0–4.9: 293

Date	Country and location	M_{w}	Depth (km)	MMI	Notes	Casualties	
Date	Country and location	M_{w}	Depth (km)	MMI	Notes	Dead	Injured
5	New Zealand, Hawke's Bay Region, North Island	5.6	32.0	VI	Some damage was reported.		
9	Tonga	6.0	33.0				
10	Algeria, Chlef Province	7.3	10.0	X	Deadliest event in 1980. The 1980 El Asnam earthquake was the largest event in Algerian history. 5,000 people died and over 9,000 were injured. Catastrophic property damage was caused. 25,000 homes were destroyed. Damage costs reached $5.2 billion (1980 rate).	5,000	9,000
10	Algeria, Chlef Province	6.2	10.0	VII	Aftershock.		
24	France, southeast of Loyalty Islands, New Caledonia	6.7	33.0		Foreshock of October 25 event.		
24	Mexico, Puebla	6.4	72.0	IX	300 people were killed in the 1980 Oaxaca earthquake. At least 101 people were injured. $5 million (1980 rate) in damage costs were reported.	300	101
25	France, southeast of Loyalty Islands, New Caledonia	6.7	33.0		Foreshock of later event.		
25	France, southeast of Loyalty Islands, New Caledonia	7.2	33.0				
25	France, southeast of Loyalty Islands, New Caledonia	6.5	33.0		Aftershock.		
26	Philippines, off the east coast of Samar	6.1	48.0	V			

=== November ===
November
- Strongest magnitude: 7.2 M_{w} United States
- Deadliest: 6.9 M_{w} Italy; 4,689 deaths
- Total fatalities: 4,696

Number by magnitude
- 8.0–8.9: 0
- 7.0–7.9: 1
- 6.0–6.9: 5
- 5.0–5.9: 109
- 4.0–4.9: 268

Date	Country and location	M_{w}	Depth (km)	MMI	Notes	Casualties	
Date	Country and location	M_{w}	Depth (km)	MMI	Notes	Dead	Injured
8	United States, off the coast of northern California	7.2	19.0	VIII	The 1980 Eureka earthquake caused 6 injuries and $2 million (1980 rate) in property damage.		6
12	Peru, Ayacucho Region	4.9	71.0	III	7 deaths were caused as well as $1 million (1980 rate) in damage.	7	
19	India, Sikkim	6.1	17.0	VIII			
23	Italy, Campania	6.9	10.0	X	The 1980 Irpinia earthquake devastated southern Italy. 4,689 people were killed and 7,700 were injured. $20 billion (1980 rate) in property damage was caused.	4,689	7,700
26	Colombia, Norte de Santander Department	5.0	40.0	IV	36 people were hurt. 30 homes were destroyed.		36

=== December ===
December
- Strongest magnitude: 6.8 M_{w} Canada
- Deadliest: 5.8 M_{w} Iran; 26 deaths
- Total fatalities: 29

Number by magnitude
- 8.0–8.9: 0
- 7.0–7.9: 0
- 6.0–6.9: 7
- 5.0–5.9: 104
- 4.0–4.9: 222

Date	Country and location	M_{w}	Depth (km)	MMI	Notes	Casualties	
Date	Country and location	M_{w}	Depth (km)	MMI	Notes	Dead	Injured
11	Bolivia, Potosi Department	6.1	80.0	V			
17	Canada, off the west coast of Vancouver Island	6.8	10.0				
19	Iran, Qom Province	5.8	33.0	VIII	26 people were killed. Property damage was reported with costs reaching $5 million (1980 rate).	26	
19	Tonga	6.1	33.0				
22	Iran, Qom Province	5.5	41.0	VII	Aftershock of December 19 event. 3 people died and 139 were injured. $1 million (1980 rate) in further property damage was caused.	3	139
31	Soviet Union, Kuril Islands, Russia	6.5	33.0				
