= 1980 Oaxaca earthquake =

Earthquake in central Mexico

1980 Central Mexico earthquake
- Location within Mexico
- UTC time: 1980-10-24 14:53:36
- ISC event: 637581
- USGS-ANSS: ComCat
- Local date: October 24, 1980
- Local time: 08:53:36
- Magnitude: 7.2 M_{w}
- Depth: 65.7 km (41 mi)
- Epicenter: 18.08°N 98.22°W
- Type: Dip-slip
- Areas affected: Mexico; Guatemala
- Total damage: $5 million
- Max. intensity: MMI IX (Violent)
- Tsunami: No
- Casualties: 65–300+ dead Many injured 150,000 displaced

The 1980 Oaxaca earthquake occurred on October 24 at 08:53:36 local time with a moment magnitude of 7.2 and a maximum Mercalli intensity of IX (Violent). This dip-slip shock left up to 300 dead, many injured, and about 150,000 homeless. While it was felt throughout southern Mexico and in Guatemala, damage (totaling $5 million) was focused in the Huajuapan de León region of the state of Oaxaca.

== See also ==
- List of earthquakes in 1980
- List of earthquakes in Mexico
