= 1980 Honduras earthquake =

- Location within Central America
- UTC time: 1980-08-09 05:45:10
- ISC event: 639880
- USGS-ANSS: ComCat
- Local date: August 8, 1980
- Local time: 23:45:10
- Magnitude: 6.4–6.7
- Depth: 22 km (14 mi)
- Epicenter: 15.888°N 88.516°W
- Max. intensity: MMI VII (Very strong)
- Casualties: 2 deaths

The 1980 Honduras earthquake struck just offshore Honduras on August 9 at 05:45 UTC. Two people were killed and many injured.

== Geology ==
The earthquake's epicenter lay in the Gulf of Honduras, just offshore.

Honduras lies just off the triple-junction of the North American, Cocos, and Caribbean tectonic plates to the north. On the other sides it is surrounded by transform faults and trenches created by the movement of these plates. The most seismic activity occurs along the plate boundary between Caribbean and Cocos in a N–E trending Wadati–Benioff zone, split into two sections, one with a shallow dip, the other with a far more steep decline. The plates are converging by subduction, Cocos under the Caribbean, at a rate of 6.5 cm (2.6 in) to 10 cm (3.9 in) annually. Within Honduras, there are at least three other major faults–La Ceiba, Guyape, and Aguan–apparently unrelated to plate movement.

== Damage and casualties ==
The earthquake hit at 05:45 UTC, around 11:47 PM local time. It caused the most damage at Puerto Barrios in Izabal Department, Guatemala, and Puerto Cortes, Honduras, and it killed two people and measured between 6.4 and 6.7 surface-wave magnitude. The quake was felt throughout Honduras, Belize, and parts of Guatemala. Damage was recorded at the port town of Livingston and extended to northwestern Puerto Rico; this damage is poorly recorded.

The earthquake severed communications with rural hill and coastal villages in Honduras, and it frightened thousands of people into leaving their homes. Early reports listed only one fatality; a man from San Pedro Sula suffered a heart attack from the tremor's initial rupture. In Puerto Cortes, 75 homes, a hotel, a Texaco refinery, and a then-United Brands rail line all at least partially collapsed, the homes all fully. As a result, three people were injured by downed walls and ceilings. In Puerto Barrios, two homes collapsed. Belize City, 100 mi (160 km) to the north, experienced the shaking but reported no damage. The earthquake did not extend to Tegucigalpa, Honduras' capital, or Guatemala's capital, Guatemala City.

== See also ==
- List of earthquakes in 1980
