= Buried rupture earthquake =

Earthquake which does not produce a visible offset in the ground along the fault

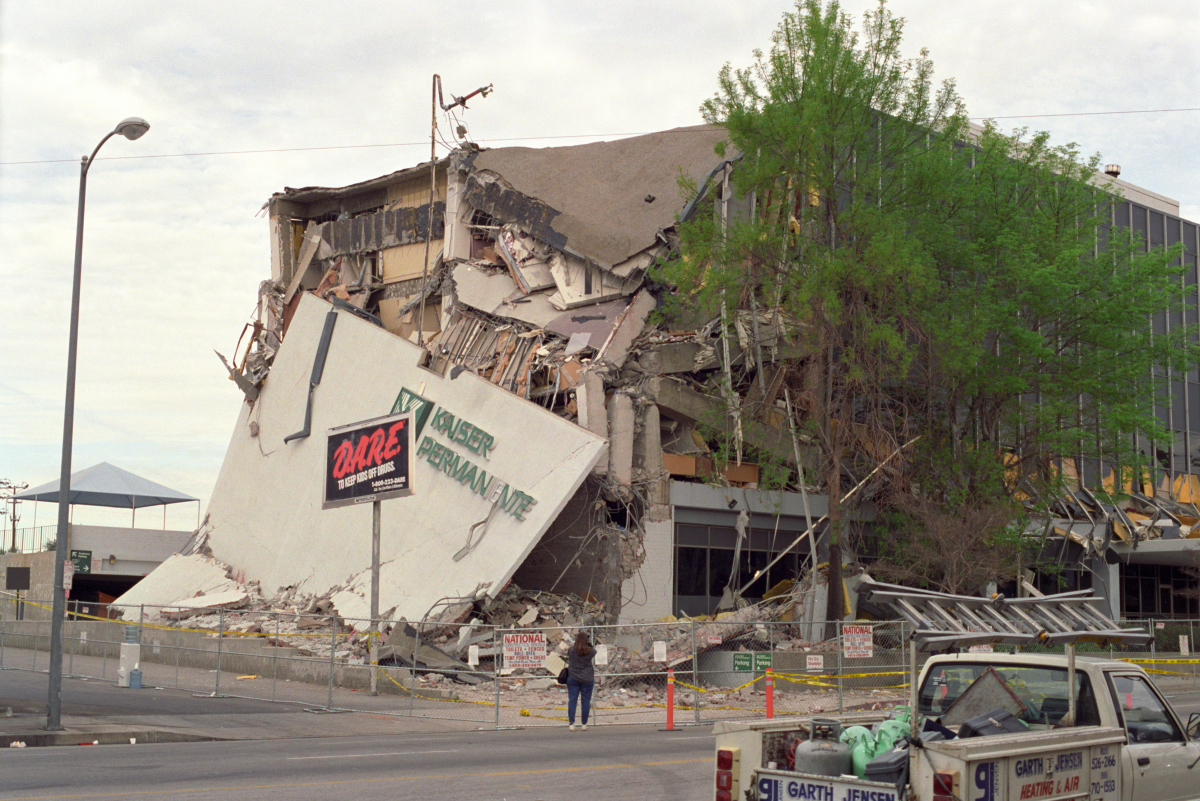
The Northridge earthquake was a buried rupture earthquake, which caused massive surface damage

In seismology, a buried rupture earthquake, or blind earthquake, is an earthquake which does not produce a visible offset in the ground along the fault (as opposed to a surface rupture earthquake, which does). When the fault in question is a thrust fault, the earthquake is known as a blind thrust earthquake.

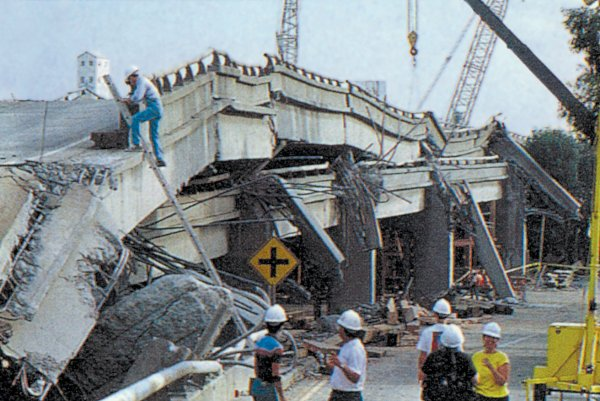
The Cypress Street Viaduct's collapsed upper deck and failed support columns, from the 1989 Loma Prieta earthquake, which was a buried rupture earthquake,

== Ground motion ==
Recorded ground motions of large surface-rupture earthquakes are weaker than the ground motions from buried rupture earthquakes.

== Depth ==
The asperity for a buried rupture earthquakes is in area deeper than roughly 5 kilometres (3.1 mi). Examples are the Loma Prieta earthquake, Northridge earthquake, and the Noto Hanto earthquake.

== Tsunamis ==
As compared to the seabed surface rupture case, uplifted water outside the fault plane in buried rupture earthquakes makes for large tsunami waves.

== See also ==
- Aseismic creep
