= GeoHazards International =

Non-profit organization

- Abbreviation: GHI
- Founded: 1991
- Founder: Brian Tucker
- Type: 501(c)(3) non-profit organization
- Purpose: Preparedness; Mitigation
- Location: Menlo Park, California
- Region served: Worldwide
- Method: Education; Natural disaster scenarios; Infrastructure projects; Seismic retrofit; Earthquake engineering
- Website: geohaz.org

GeoHazards International (GHI) is a 501(c)(3) non-profit organization dedicated to ending preventable death and suffering caused by natural disasters in the world's most vulnerable communities. Founded in 1991, GHI is the first non-profit, nongovernmental organization dedicated to mitigating earthquake, tsunami, and landslide risks in the world's poorest and most at-risk regions. Its solutions emphasize preparedness, mitigation, and building local capacity in order to manage risk.

== History ==
Since its founding in 1991, GeoHazards International has worked in more than 20 different countries around the world to develop and deploy preventative solutions that are known to save lives in the face of natural disasters such as earthquakes, tsunamis, landslides, and impacts from climate change.

Brian Tucker initially formulated the idea for the organization in 1977 when he visited Tajikistan, soon after completing his Ph.D. in seismology, as part of an exchange program between the Soviet Union and the United States. After conversations with local community members in some of the mountainous regions of the country, many of whom could still recall the devastating earthquake that hit the country in 1949, Tucker thought simple changes in building design could dramatically reduce the risk of deaths and injuries from earthquakes in developing countries, but also realized many people had not taken those steps. Fourteen years later, Tucker founded GeoHazards International in order to realize his vision of communities in the most vulnerable areas around the world preparing for and mitigating the risks associated with natural disasters through technical solutions and local expertise.

The focus on people in low- and middle-income countries comes from the concern that these countries face the highest risk of death and injury in natural disasters, due to poor building code enforcement, poor urban planning, and no local technical skills to manage high risk.

== Approach ==
GeoHazards International builds its mission around prevention, working to limit predictable losses in natural disasters through international collaboration, projects, education, and the creation and distribution of guidance. Tucker has credited the sociologist and writer Everett Rogers' theory on the diffusion of innovations as an important influence on GeoHazard International's approach, informing their "Theory of Change":

A community will reduce its risk when a trusted peer shows that the community's risk is unacceptably large—e.g., its children are at significant risk of dying—and demonstrates an affordable, socially acceptable, and verifiable method to reduce that risk. The concrete ways we do this are to raise awareness of risk and risk mitigation options, build local capacity, develop public policies and strengthen critical infrastructure, and promote preparedness and prevention.

GeoHazards International uses the following elements in its approach to help communities to recognize, prepare for, and respond to natural disasters:

1. Bring experts to the local level
2. Build local capacity and support
3. Safeguard schools and hospitals
4. Use demonstration projects
5. Help local partners gain resources
6. Act before disasters
7. Serve the most vulnerable
8. Improve urban development
9. Raise awareness of known risk

== Areas of work and impact ==
GeoHazards International partners with numerous organizations around the world in carrying out their mission, including its local partner organization in India, GeoHazards Society India, and the National Society for Earthquake Technology-Nepal (NSET), a non-profit based in Nepal that GeoHazards International supported in the mid-1990s and that has since flourished into its own self-sustaining organization. Staff offices are located in Menlo Park, California; Thimphu, Bhutan; New Delhi, India; and Aizawl, India.

In 1999, GHI and NSET established an annual Nepal Earthquake Safety Day. Its main purpose is to raise awareness and share information and experiences on risk reduction for earthquakes and other natural disasters. It serves as the culmination of earthquake risk management works implemented in the country in the preceding 12 months. Every year on the second day of the Nepali month Magh (the 15th or 16 January), a series of weeklong activities provides the opportunity for the reflection on yearlong efforts; renewal of national commitments toward earthquake safety promotion; and increased public awareness through training sessions, guidance materials, and public service announcements.

Much of GHI's work targets schools and hospitals. In 2014, GHI-sponsored school preparedness programs trained over 750,000 students in India about what to do during an earthquake. GHI worked with numerous hospitals in India, Nepal, and Bhutan to prepare facilities so that they could provide uninterrupted care after disasters.

GeoHazards International also focuses on addressing structural concerns of specific building types prevalent in vulnerable countries around the world. It carried out a project, with funding from the Earthquake Engineering Research Institute (EERI) and Thornton Tomasetti Foundation, focusing on a type of building characterized by concrete frames with unreinforced masonry infill walls that is common in earthquake-threatened urban areas of Asia, Latin America, and the Mediterranean due to the low construction costs. In this project, GeoHazards International developed guidance manuals and formed the Framed Infill Network, an international group of earthquake engineering researchers and professionals, to improve how concrete frames and masonry infill walls are designed and built so they are safer in earthquakes. In 2015, GeoHazards International published a guidance document from a USAID-sponsored project created to help organizations and communities to develop the best advice on protective actions to take during earthquake shaking to help the greatest number of people. Prior to this project, no clear guidance had existed on how to consider the numerous factors involved in creating an appropriate message for areas with many vulnerable buildings, or on how to interpret the limited data and numerous—often conflicting—anecdotes endorsing one protective action over another.

Funding for GeoHazards International's work has come from a variety of sources. USAID, Swiss Re, and Munich Re have funded many of their projects in the past.

== Work in Nepal ==
GeoHazards International's work in Nepal gained heightened media attention in the aftermath of the country's April 25, 2015 earthquake, its May aftershock, and other later aftershocks. Around two weeks before those earthquakes, GeoHazards International published a warning that "the 1.5 million people living in the Kathmandu Valley were clearly facing a serious and growing earthquake risk," because an absence of any building code had meant most construction had taken place without consideration of natural disaster risk, technical information about earthquake risk in the Kathmandu Valley was incomplete and dispersed among several governmental agencies, and rapid population growth with one of the highest urban densities in the world made it challenging for Nepal's preliminary progress on reducing its earthquake vulnerability to occur quickly enough.

In the aftermath of the Nepal earthquakes, a rush of non-profits, NGOs, family foundations, relief organizations, and individual donors looked to raise money to rebuild the damaged Nepalese infrastructure. In a publication on their website a week after the first earthquake and its aftershocks, Tucker warned that well-meaning people might inadvertently recreate the conditions that made the recent earthquake so devastating, due to their lack of experience or expertise in building earthquake-resistant buildings. GeoHazards International urged aid organizations to positively influence Nepal's reconstruction by ensuring that newly built structures would be resilient to inevitable future earthquakes. He encouraged other South Asian countries to recognize that future earthquakes similar to Nepal's are likely to occur within their borders and to take immediate steps to reduce the risk to people and their livelihoods.
