= Rastriya Samachar Samiti =

Government-run news agency in Nepal

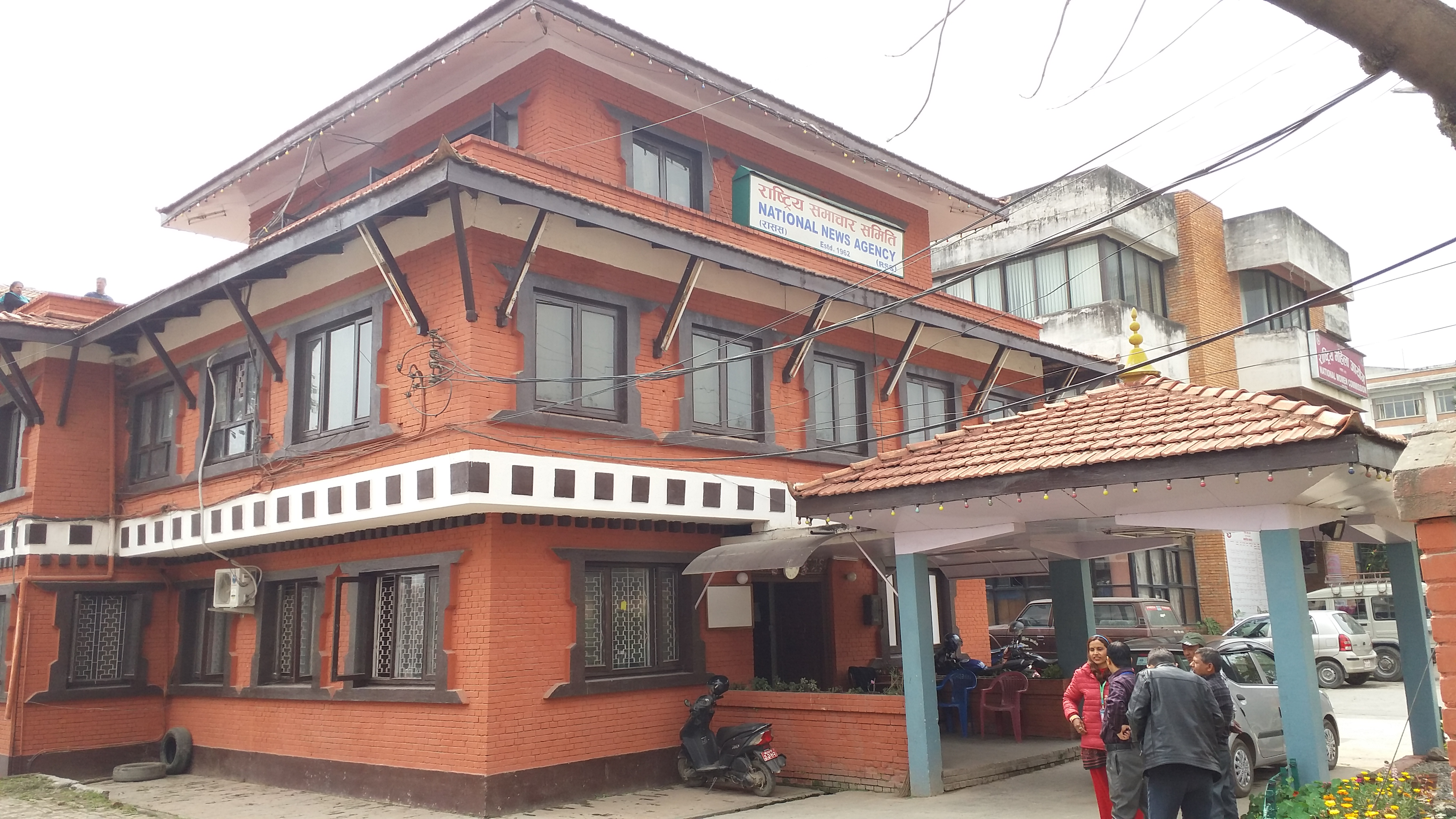
- Type: News agency
- Founded: 4 December 1962 (63 years ago)
- Headquarters: Kathmandu, Nepal
- Area served: Worldwide
- Website: rssnepal.org.np

The Rastriya Samachar Samiti (RSS; Nepali: राष्ट्रिय समाचार समिती; translation: National News Agency), having a nationwide network, is the largest and longest serving news agency in Nepal. It was established in 1961 (2018 BS) under the Rastriya Samachar Samiti Act, 2019 BS, merging two privately owned news agencies with a view to facilitating newspapers and broadcast media. With the development of news media in Nepal, subscribers of RSS have reached more than 100 newspapers, radio, online media and television. A pool of permanent and stronger reporters scattered throughout the country contributes to the news service and photo file every day.

== History ==
The RSS has had arrangements for the exchange of news with the Associated Press (AP) of the USA, Agence France Presse (AFP) of France, Xinhua of China, Kyodo of Japan, Press Trust of India and Associated Press of Pakistan for over three decades, and has recently started providing a high quality photo service of national and international events subscribing from the AP, AFP, Xinhua and Kyodo. The RSS also exchanges news with these news agencies as part of bilateral arrangements.

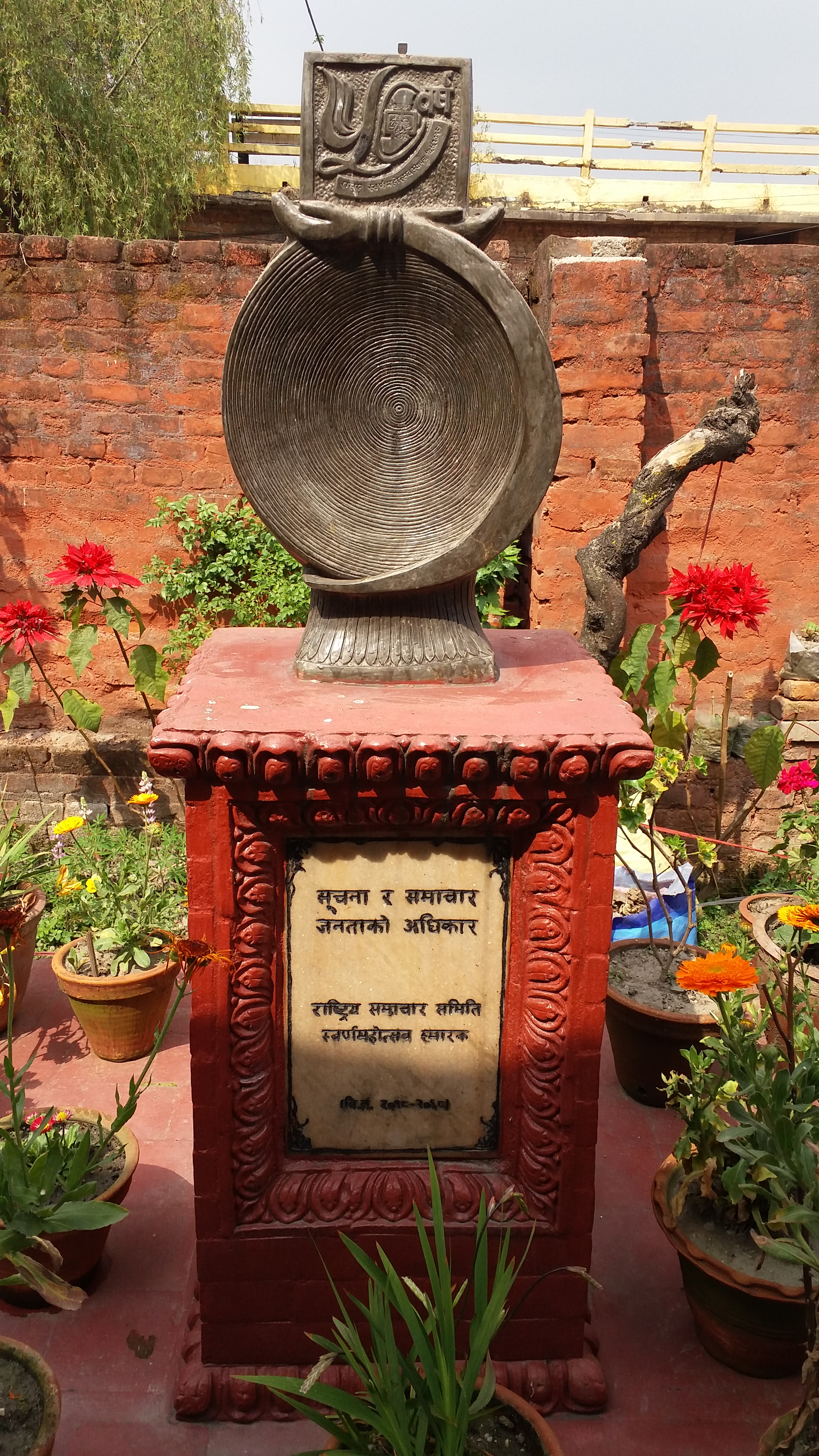
National news agency Golden jubilee (1961-2011) statue Kathmandu Nepal
