= 1833 Bihar–Nepal earthquake =

Earthquake in Nepal and India

- Location within Nepal
- Local date: 26 August 1833
- Local time: 22:58 NPT
- Magnitude: 7.6–7.9 M_{w}
- Epicenter: 27.7°N 85.7°E
- Fault: Main Himalayan Thrust
- Type: Thrust (Blind)
- Areas affected: Nepal, India & Tibet
- Max. intensity: MMI X (Extreme)
- Foreshocks: 2
- Aftershocks: Yes
- Casualties: ~500 dead

The 1833 Nepal–India earthquake occurred on August 26 at 22:58 local time (NPT). This earthquake had an estimated moment magnitude (M_{w}) of 7.6–7.9 and struck with an epicenter somewhere in or near the Kathmandu Valley. The earthquake caused major destruction in numerous towns and villages in Nepal, Northern India, and Tibet. The earthquake was also felt in Chittagong, Bangladesh. Despite the extent of the damage, the number of fatalities resulting from the earthquake was surprisingly low, at approximately 500. This was because the mainshock was preceded by two smaller but intense foreshocks earlier that day, causing many residents to take refuge outside their homes.

== Geology ==
The Main Himalayan Thrust is a décollement structure that defines the boundary between the Indian Plate and Eurasian Plate. This thrust fault is the source of most of Nepal's earthquakes. The earthquake of 1833 has been suggested by geologists to be a repeat of the 1344 earthquake, and the 2015 Gorkha earthquake was a repeat of the 1833 event. All of which failed to release all the strain that had been building over the past centuries thus was an incomplete rupture of the Main Himalayan Thrust.

The décollement rupture area of the 1833 event is likely the same as in 2015, but closer to Kathmandu. Both earthquakes occurred along the MHT but did not rupture to the surface, thus, were blind thrust earthquakes. Inferring from isoseismal maps prepared after the quake, researchers believe the earthquake was caused by an 80–120 km × 40 km section of the megathrust rupturing. The same fault patch that ruptured in 1833 would re-rupture again during the M_{w} 8.0 1934 Bihar earthquake, as the 1833 event did little to release the elastic tension along the décollement.

Very little is known about the epicenter location of the earthquake due to the poor constrains in data. Researcher and seismologist Nicholas Ambraseys determined the epicenter coordinates was 27.7°N 85.7°E. Another epicenter area located roughly 130 km west of the 1934 earthquake epicenter, at the eastern edge of a seismic gap has been favoured by many authors.

== Earthquake ==
At about 6:00 pm, the first foreshock was felt in Kathmandu for 40 seconds, it was significant but not strong enough to cause any fatalities. Plants and trees were seen swaying from the crowns to their roots. The next foreshock occurred at 10:45 pm, which had similar effects like the one five hours earlier. These foreshocks would have a large influence on the number of casualties caused by the mainshock.

Fifteen minutes later, another earthquake rocked the city. It was described in the beginning as gentle rocking, followed by some rumbling sounds. Shaking then escalated to a more violent characteristic; trees were seen bending, and houses ripped from their foundations. Horses and cattle escaped from their stalls, frightened by the earthquake. The earthquake was so strong that people found it difficult to walk, like those seen in footages of the 2015 earthquake. It lasted an approximate three minutes. Many terrified residents got to the ground and began to pray during the earthquake.

In Kathmandu, the earthquake was assigned a modified Mercalli intensity scale rating of VIII (Severe) to X (Extreme). In an article published by The India Gazette on September 12 the same year, the earthquake was perceived as wave-like with long rolls and peaks, in a northeast and southwest direction.

At Chhapra, Bihar, the mainshock was still strong enough to be felt even from Nepal. It shook houses and woke many residents from their sleep. Many people rushed out of their houses even as more strong shock rocked the city. Huge chunks of cornice and plasters fell from walls during the quake. Several native dwellings were reportedly destroyed, and at least three people died from house collapses. A massive fissure also tore through the ground some two miles from the city.

The foreshocks were also distinctly felt in Gorakhpur, Uttar Pradesh, jolting many people from their sleep, including the Europeans settling in the area. Almost all the Europeans residing in an establishment ran out of their residences for fear that they would crumble. Tremors were still felt even 20 minutes later. The mainshock struck at just before midnight, described as more violent than earlier events, and as if being "seized by several hands and shaken violently backward and forwards". All the local residents in the city dashed out of their homes. The earthquake was so intense that standing was nearly impossible.

=== Aftershocks ===
An aftershock sequence immediately followed after the mainshock, but it gradually decayed after persisting for several weeks. Strong aftershocks were felt on October 4, October 18, and November 26 of 1833.

In 1835, a major aftershock struck the same region. The estimated magnitude of this aftershock is on the order of M_{w} 6.5 or greater. Thirty-three years later, another large earthquake struck on May 23, 1866. Estimates of this magnitude range between M_{w} 6.8 and 7.4, too small to cause any surface ruptures. Its epicenter location remains uncertain although some geologists suggest it was in the same location as the May 2015 Nepal earthquake, or it might be a deeper event like that of the Bihar earthquake in 1988.

== Impact ==
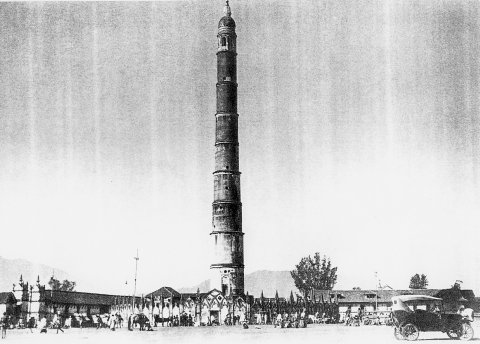
The newly restored Dharahara Tower in 1920.

The earthquake was felt over an area roughly 1 million km^{2} in Nepal, northern India, and southern Tibet. Large landslides, rockfalls and avalanches in the mountainous region destroyed over 4,600 homes and temples. The two foreshocks occurring a few hours to minutes before the larger quake may have greatly reduced the death toll. Residents were driven out of their homes and dwellings due to panic caused by the two shocks. Had the two foreshocks not happened, many residents would have been killed.

At least 30% or more of all homes in northern Nepal and the southern Tibet region were totally destroyed. In the Kathmandu Valley, 400 buildings crumpled to the ground, burying many occupants residing in them. One of the two towers of the Dharahara, built by Bhimsen Thapa collapsed completely and was never rebuilt. The other tower suffered minor damage and was repaired shortly after. The new tower stood over the city until 1934 when the magnitude 8.0 earthquake would knock it down again. The other was partially damaged and quickly restored, only to be destroyed once again during the 1934 Bihar earthquake. The home of Matabarsing Thapa, was completely destroyed, and the garden houses belonging to Bhimsen Thapa became unfit for occupancy. In all, a total of 18,000 buildings were totally wiped out, with over 4,000 having collapsed in the Kathmandu Valley region.

In the town of Bhaktapur (then Bhatgaon), east of the Kathmandu Valley, at least 200 individuals were killed, making it the worst affected area outside the valley. One quarter (25%) to 70% of the town suffered major destruction, including at least 2,000 homes and six to eight temples.

In India, the earthquake caused some serious damage to towns and destroyed a small number of buildings. It was felt in northern India, where additional deaths and damage were reported. Damage there was generally less widespread, with fewer deaths recorded. The capital of Uttar Pradesh, Lucknow, felt four distinct shocks with the last two causing homes to creak, and lamps to swing about. The shaking caused animals including birds, elephants, and snakes to behave unusually. Residents of the city ran out of their homes, fearing it would collapse on them, and began to pray. The same effects were observed in other parts of India, where many people and animals became frightened.

== See also ==
- List of earthquakes in Nepal
- List of earthquakes in India
- List of historical earthquakes
