= Tingkhong =

Tingkhong Ting-Khong
- Town
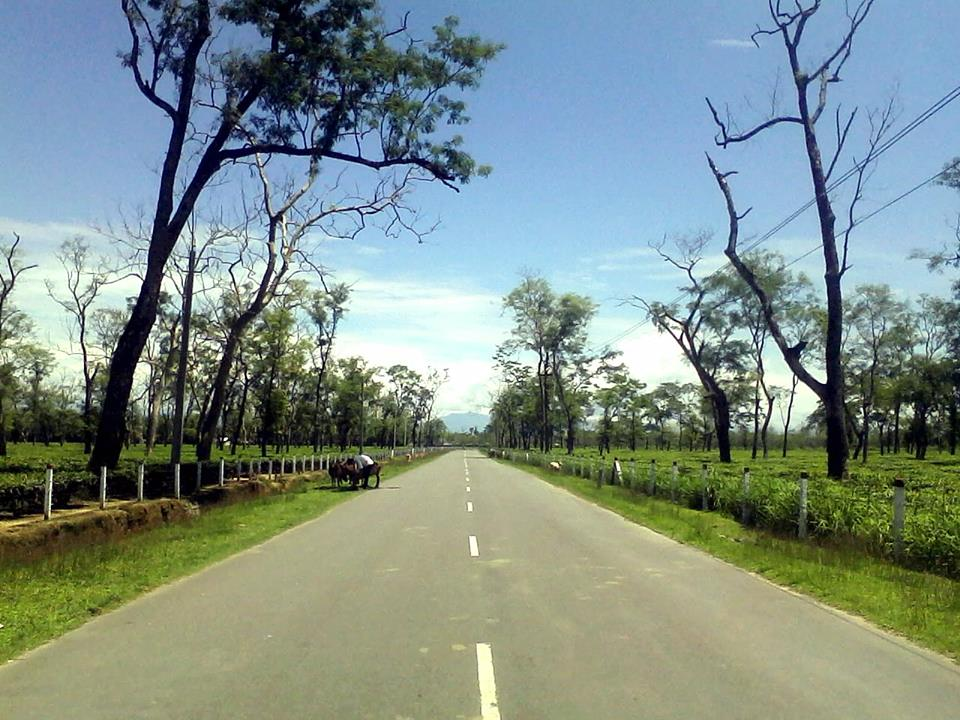
- Naharkatia Moran road through Tingkhong Tea Estate

- Location in Assam, India Tingkhong (India)
- Coordinates: 27.23°N 95.17°E
- Country: India
- State: Assam
- District: Dibrugarh

Area
  - Total: 16.5 km^{2} (6.4 sq mi)
- Elevation: 116 m (381 ft)

Population (2001)
  - Total: 236,571
  - Density: 14,300/km^{2} (37,100/sq mi)

Languages
  - Official: Assamese
- Time zone: UTC+5:30 (IST)
- PIN: 786612
- Telephone code: (91)3754
- Vehicle registration: AS-06
- An ancient place of Tai-Ahom kingdom, now a town of Dibrugarh

Tingkhong is a town of Dibrugarh district of Assam state in northeast India. Administratively Tingkhong is located within Dibrugarh district and is today an important tea cultivation and oil exploration area of Assam. Tingkhong is approximately 80 km from Dibrugarh by road towards south-east and approximately 70 km from Tinsukia (locally pronounced as Tinicukeeya) towards south. The nearest airport is Dibrugarh located at a distance of approximately 70 km and nearest small railway station is at Naharkatia town. Urban areas close to Tingkhong are Naharkatiya - 20 km, Duliajan - 33 km, Sonari - 18 km, Moran - 37 km, etc. by roadways.

== History ==
It is said that Suhungmung (1497–1539) built the town of Tingkhong, settled a number of Ahom princes. Henceforth, it became the residence of the Tungkhungia Ahom princes (1681 - 1838). Gadadhar Singha had famously built here the Rahdoi pukhuri here.

== Geography ==
Tingkhong is located at 27.13°N 95.10°E. It has an average elevation of 116 metres (381 feet).

== Transport ==
The Naharkatia Railway station serves as the railhead which is 20 km apart. Buses play frequently to and from Naharkatia, Moran, Rajgarh, etc. And direct bus facility to district centre Dibrugarh .

== Economy ==
Most of the people of Tingkhong are depend on farming of paddy and tea. There are numerous tea gardens in this constituency. Approximately every household have their own small tea gardens.

== Culture ==
Bihu The major indigenous festival of Assam, during this season Bihu dance competition is held in Langharjan stadium. It is a week-long celebration for all the youngsters in the region.

== Education ==
Primary & Secondary Schools: There are several schools for primary education in the whole constituency. Out of them Tingkhong Model Academy and Tingkhong Jatia Vidyalaya are known by all.

Higher Education: Tingkhong College is the only institution of Higher Education. It offers bachelor's degree in Arts.

== Members of Legislative Assembly ==
The town is also a constituency in the Assam Legislative Assembly.

- 1978: Bhadeswar Gogoi, Janata Party
- 1985: Atul Chandra Koch, Independent Candidate
- 1991: Pritibi Majhi, Indian National Congress
- 1996: Atuwa Munda, Indian National Congress
- 2001: Atuwa Munda, Indian National Congress
- 2006: Anup Phunkan, Asom Gana Parishad
- 2011: Atuwa Munda, Indian National Congress
- 2016: Bimal Borah, Bhartiya Janata Party
- 2021: Bimal Borah, Bhartiya Janata Party
