= List of earthquakes in Nepal =

Lying in one of the most seismically active regions of the world, Nepal has a long history of earthquakes. The first documented earthquake event in the country dates back to 7 June 1255, during the reign of King Abhaya Malla. The quake, measuring 7.8 on the Richter scale, took the life of the king and wiped out a third of Kathmandu's then population. Nepal has witnessed at least one major earthquake per century ever since.

The following is a list of earthquakes in Nepal. It includes only major seismic events with their epicentre in the country, and those that occurred outside the country, that resulted in a significant loss of life and property in the country.

== List ==
Date	Time‡	Place	Lat	Long	Deaths	Mag.	Comments	Sources
1255-07-07		Kathmandu	27.7	85.3	2,200	7.8		
1260		Sagarmatha	27.1	86.8	100	7.1		
1344		Mechi	27.5	87.5	100	7.9		
1408-08		Near Nepal-Tibet Border, Bagmati zone	27.9	86.0	2,500	8.2		
1505-06-06		Karnali zone see 1505 Lo Mustang earthquake	29.5	83.0	6,000	8.9		
1681-01		Northern Kosi zone	27.6	87.1	4,500	8.0		
1767-07		Northern Bagmati zone	28.0	85.5	4,000	7.9		
1833-08-26		Kathmandu, Bihar see 1833 Kathmandu–Bihar earthquake	27.9	85.5	6,500	8.0		
1869-07-07		Kathmandu	27.7	85.3	750	6.5		
1916-08-28	06:39	Nepal, Tibet	30.0	81.0	3,500	7.7		
1934-01-15	08:43	Nepal, India see 1934 Nepal–India earthquake	26.773	86.762	10,700–12,000	8.0		
1966-06-27	10:41	Doti	29.554	80.854	80	6.3		
1980-07-29	14:58	Pithoragarh see 1980 Nepal earthquake	29.598	81.092	200	6.5		
1988-08-20	23:09	Kathmandu, Bihar see 1988 Nepal earthquake	26.775	86.616	1,091	6.9		
2011-09-18	18:29	Sikkim see 2011 Sikkim earthquake	27.33	88.62	111	6.9		
2015-04-25	11:56	Gorkha see April 2015 Nepal earthquake	28.147	84.708	8,857	7.8 or 8.1	see also list of 2015 aftershocks	
2015-05-12	12:38	Dolakha see May 2015 Nepal earthquake	27.97	85.96	213	7.3	One of the 2015 aftershocks	
2022-11-09	02:12	Doti see 2022 Nepal earthquake	29.30	81.16	6	5.7		
2023-11-03	23:47	Jajarkot see 2023 Nepal earthquake	28.84	82.18	157	5.7		
Note: The inclusion criteria for adding events are based on WikiProject Earthquakes' notability guideline that was developed for stand alone articles. The principles described also apply to lists. In summary, only damaging, injurious, or deadly events should be recorded.

== See also ==
- Geology of Nepal
