= 1905 Kangra earthquake =

Disaster in Himachal Pradesh, India

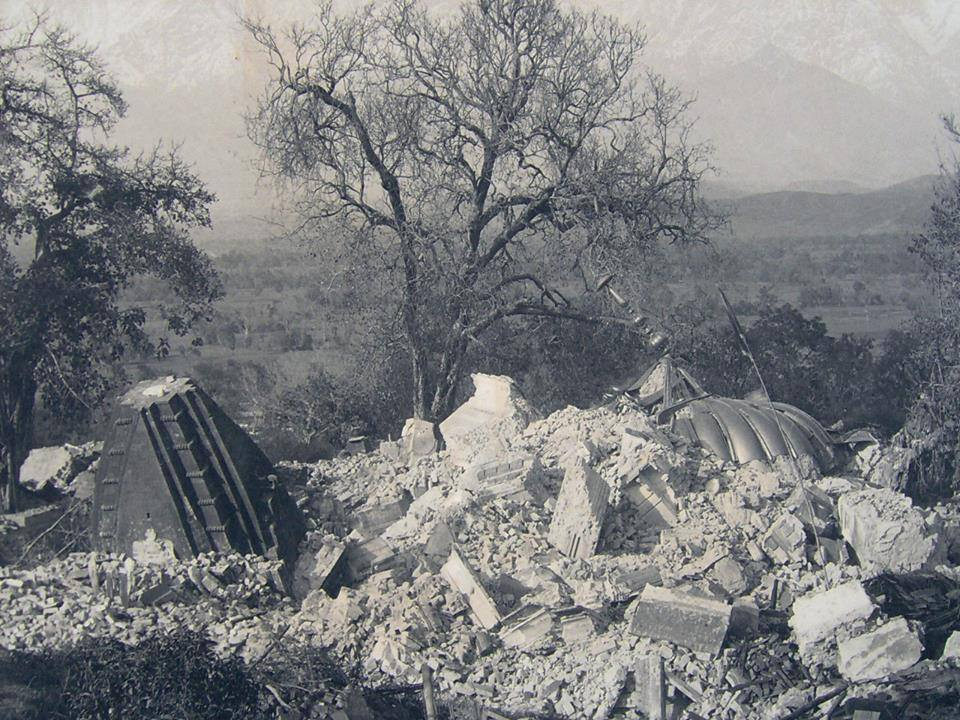
- Photograph of the ruins of Bajreshwari Mata Temple, Kangra taken in the aftermath of the 1905 Kangra earthquake

- USGS ShakeMap

- Location within India
- UTC time: 1905-04-04 00:50:00
- ISC event: 16957848
- USGS-ANSS: ComCat
- Local date: 4 April 1905
- Local time: Early morning
- Magnitude: 7.8 M_{s}
- Epicenter: 33.0°N 76.0°E
- Fault: Main Himalayan Thrust
- Areas affected: Colonial India
- Max. intensity: EMS-98 IX (Destructive); MMI X (Extreme)
- Casualties: >20,000

The 1905 Kangra earthquake occurred in the Kangra Valley and the Kangra district of the Himachal Pradesh, in India on 4 April 1905. The earthquake measured 7.8 on the surface-wave magnitude scale and killed more than 20,000 people. Apart from this, most buildings in the towns of Kangra, Mcleodganj and Dharamshala were destroyed. The earthquake also had a widespread impact in Jammu and Kashmir particularly in the densely populated Kashmir valley. A total of 7,000 to 8,000 people were killed in Jammu and Kashmir with 4,000 to 5,000 deaths occurring in the Kashmir valley. Widespread structural damage was reported across Himachal Pradesh, Jammu and Kashmir and Uttrakhand.

== Background ==
The calculated epicenter of the earthquake lies within the zone of thrusts along the front of the Himalayas formed by the continuing collision of the Indian plate into the Eurasian plate. Underthrusting of the Indian subcontinent beneath Tibet along a 2,500 km long convergent boundary known as the Main Himalayan Thrust has resulted in the uplifting of the overriding Eurasian plate, thus creating the long mountain range parallel to the convergent zone.

== Earthquake characteristics ==
The magnitude 7.8–7.9 earthquake struck the western Himalaya in the state of Himachal Pradesh at an estimated depth of 6 km along a very shallow dipping thrust fault, likely on the Main Himalayan Thrust detachment. The rupture area is calculated at 280 km × 80 km. The rupture did not reach the surface, therefore, is considered a blind thrust earthquake. A more recent study in 2005 estimated the rupture zone at 110 km × 55 km while still not breaking the surface.

== Damage ==
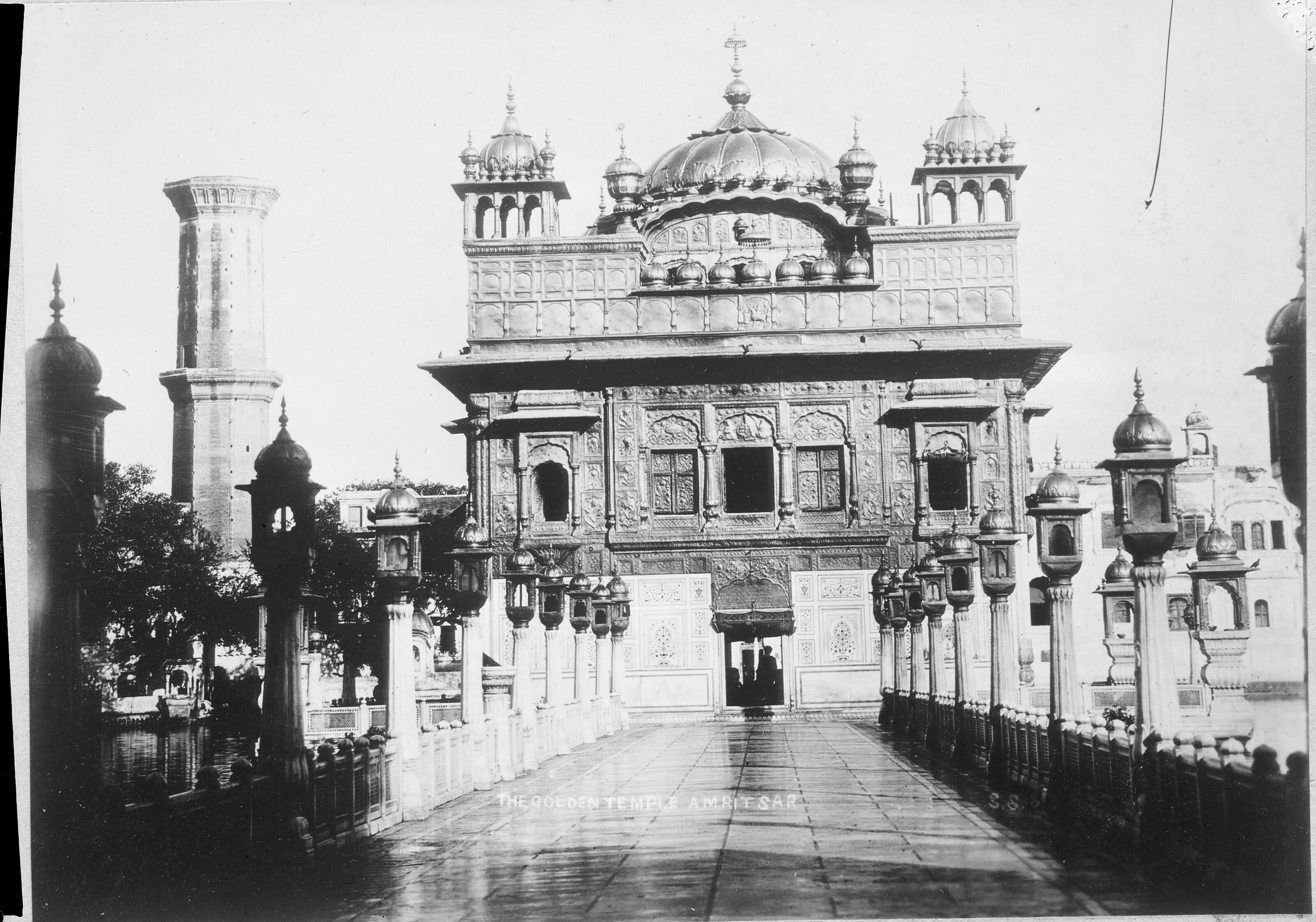
Photograph of the Golden Temple in Amritsar after the earthquake. The top dome of the Ramgarhia Bunga's burj watchtower to the left was destroyed due to the earthquake.

The earthquake reached its peak Rossi–Forel intensity of X in Kangra. About 150 km away from this zone to the southeast, an area of increased intensity reaching VIII was recorded. This unusually high intensity away from the earthquake in the Indo-Gangetic Plain included the cities Dehradun and Saharanpur. It was felt VII in towns like Kasauli, Bilaspur, Chamba, and Lahore. The Ramgarhia Bunga in Amritsar suffered damages, especially to the top domes of its two burj watchtowers.

As many as 100,000 buildings were reported to have been demolished by the earthquake. At least 20,000 people are estimated to have been killed and 53,000 domestic animals were also lost. There was also major damage to the network of hillside aqueducts that fed water to the affected area. The total cost of recovering from the effects of the earthquake was calculated at 2.9 million (1905) rupees.

== See also ==
- 1897 Assam earthquake
- List of earthquakes in 1905
- List of earthquakes in India
