= 1505 Lo Mustang earthquake =

Catastrophic earthquake in northern Nepal

- Location within Nepal
- Local date: June 6, 1505
- Magnitude: 8.2–8.8
- Epicenter: 29.5°N 83.0°E
- Fault: Main Frontal-Himalayan Thrust
- Type: Megathrust
- Areas affected: Nepal, Tibet (present-day China), India

The 1505 Lo Mustang earthquake (Nepali: सन् १५०५ को मुस्ताङ भूकम्प) occurred on 6 June 1505 and had an estimated magnitude between 8.2 and 8.8, making it one of the largest earthquakes in Nepalese history. The earthquake killed an estimated 30 percent of the Nepalese population at the time. The epicenter was in northern Nepal, and the earthquake also affected southern Tibet (present-day China) and northern India.

== Tectonic setting ==
The Himalayas are the result of the collision between the Indian plate and the Eurasian plate. India moves toward Asia at about 5.4 centimeters per year, and roughly a third of this motion, about 1.8 centimeters per year, accumulates as strain on the locked fault beneath the Himalayas and is periodically released in great earthquakes.

Western Nepal lies within the so-called central seismic gap, the longest stretch of the Himalayas without a great earthquake in instrumental times. According to seismologist Roger Bilham, if the 1505 earthquake was the last major event in this region, about 9 meters of slip has accumulated since then, enough for a repeat of similar size.

== Earthquake ==
The earthquake struck on 6 June 1505 and destroyed monasteries in southern Tibet, along a belt extending from the Mustang region of Nepal to the area north of Agra, on the Ganges plain. The extent of the damage suggests a great earthquake in what is now the central Himalayan seismic gap.

Its magnitude is estimated at between 8.2 and 8.8, placing it among the largest earthquakes in the region's history. About a month later, another strong earthquake struck Kabul, in present-day Afghanistan.

== Damage and casualties ==
The earthquake devastated the western half of Nepal and a large area of Tibet, but it does not appear in Nepalese written records and is known mainly from Tibetan sources. Several monasteries in southern Tibet were destroyed. An estimated 30 percent of Nepal's population at the time was killed.

== Research ==
In 2002, David Jackson examined four Tibetan biographies, along with accounts from India and Afghanistan, and found evidence of two major earthquakes in 1505. The study argued for wider use of Tibetan sources in historical seismology. The following year, Ambraseys and David Jackson reassessed the records of early earthquakes in northern India and southern Tibet, including the 1505 event.

Bilham and Ambraseys included the event in their summation of seismic moments for Himalayan earthquakes between 1500 and 2000, used to estimate the slip deficit not yet released along the range.

== See also ==
- List of historical earthquakes
- List of earthquakes in Nepal
