= Blind thrust earthquake =

Movement along a thrust fault that is not visible at the surface

A blind thrust earthquake occurs along a thrust fault that does not show signs on the Earth's surface, hence the designation "blind". Such faults, being invisible at the surface, have not been mapped by standard surface geological mapping. Sometimes they are discovered as a by-product of oil exploration seismology; in other cases their existence is not suspected.

Although such earthquakes are not amongst the most energetic, they are sometimes the most destructive, as conditions combine to form an urban earthquake which greatly affects urban seismic risk.

A blind thrust earthquake is quite close, in meaning, to a buried rupture earthquake, if a buried rupture earthquake is not specifically about the fault, but signs the earthquake leaves, on the Earth's surface.

== Blind thrust faults ==
Blind thrust faults generally exist near tectonic plate margins, in the broad disturbance zone. They form when a section of the Earth's crust is under high compressive stresses, due to plate margin collision, or the general geometry of how the plates are sliding past each other.

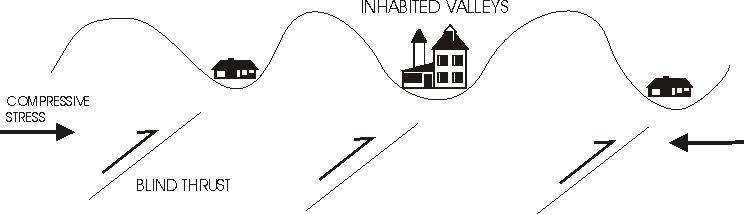
Diagram of blind-thrust faulting

As shown in the diagram, a weak plate under compression generally forms thrusting sheets, or overlapping sliding sections. This can form a hill and valley landform, with the hills being the strong sections, and the valleys being the highly disturbed thrust faulted and folded sections. After a long period of erosion the visible landscape may be flattened, with material eroded from the hills filling up the valleys and hiding the underlying hill-and-valley geology. The valley rock is very weak and usually highly weathered, presenting deep, fertile soil; naturally, this is the area that becomes populated. Reflection seismology profiles show the disturbed rock that hides a blind thrust fault.

If the region is under active compression these faults are constantly rupturing, but any given valley might only experience a large earthquake every few hundred years. Although usually of magnitude 6 to 7 compared to the largest magnitude 9 earthquakes of recent times, such a temblor is especially destructive because the seismic waves are highly directed, and the soft basin soil of the valley can amplify the ground motions tenfold or more.

== Examples of occurrence ==
=== Some known faults ===
- Los Angeles, California, USA, has many earthquakes and is well-studied. In addition to surface faults, a number of blind-thrust faults have been found under the basin and metropolitan area. A NASA study which combined satellite radar images and Global Positioning System (GPS) observations found that "tectonic squeezing across Los Angeles" "will likely produce earthquakes on either the blind Elysian Park or Puente Hills thrust fault systems". A blind thrust earthquake along the Puente Hills fault could contribute more to urban seismic risk than the 'big ones' of magnitude 8 or more.
- Bajo Segura Fault Zone, Spain
- Fukaya Fault System, Japan (near Tokyo)
- Uemachi Fault System, Osaka Basin, Japan
- Main Frontal Thrust, Himalaya

=== Specific events ===
- 1902 Turkestan earthquake – Earthquake near the China–Kyrgyzstan border
- 1963 Skopje earthquake – 1963 earthquake in Skopje, SR Macedonia
- 1987 Whittier Narrows earthquake – Earthquake in southern California
- 1994 Northridge earthquake – Earthquake in Los Angeles, California
- 2010 Haiti earthquake – Magnitude 7.0 Mw earthquake
- 2012 Visayas earthquake – Earthquake in the Philippines
- April 2015 Nepal earthquake – Magnitude 7.8 earthquake in Nepal
- 2023 Marrakesh-Safi earthquake – Earthquake in Morocco

== See also ==
- Buried rupture earthquake
- Surface rupture earthquake
