= Main Frontal Thrust =

Geological fault in the Himalayas

- Himalayan Frontal Thrust
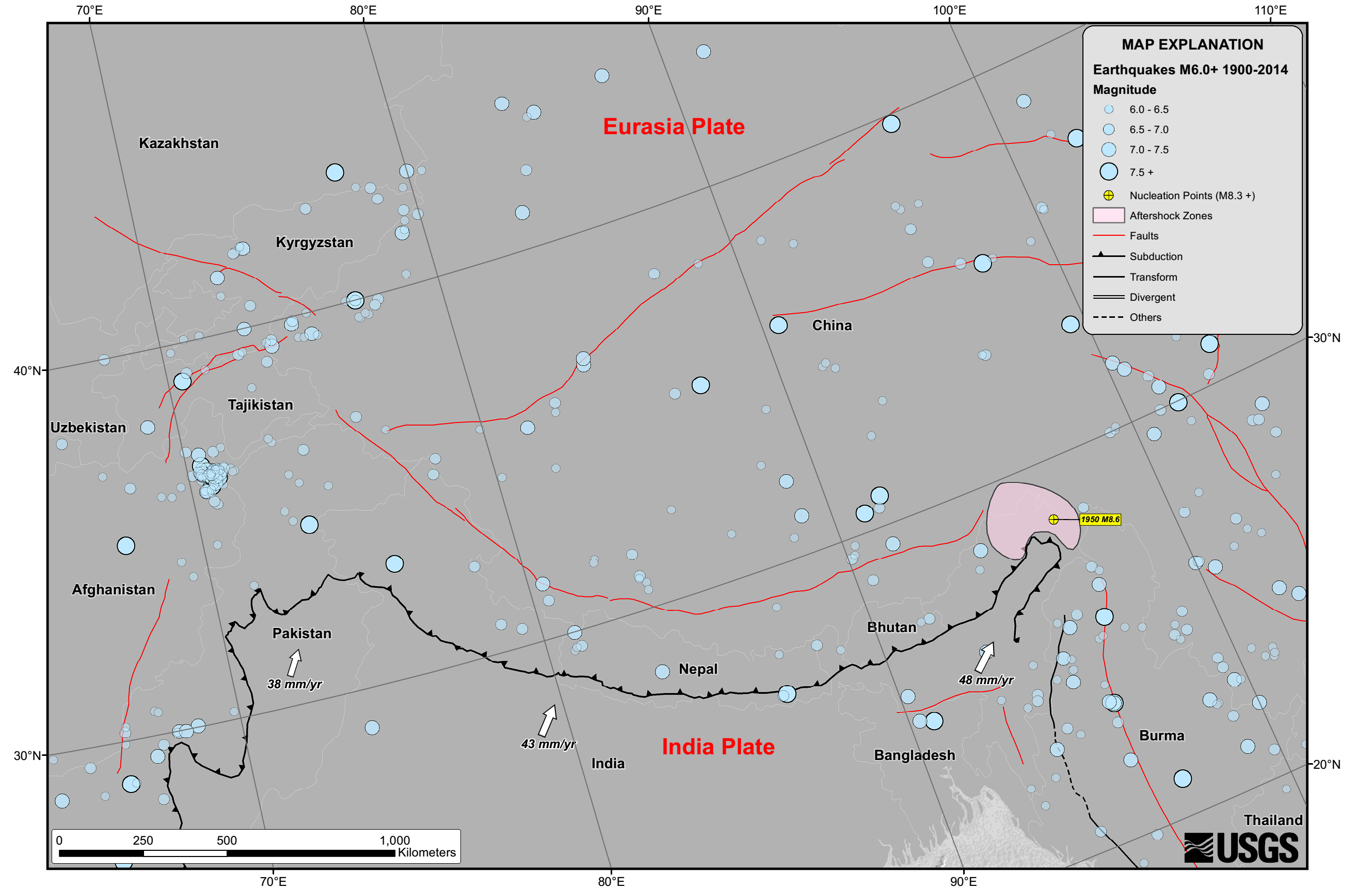
- Country: Nepal, India, Pakistan, Bhutan

Characteristics
- Range: Himalayas
- Length: 2,400 km (1,500 mi)
- Displacement: 15-21 mm/yr

Tectonics
- Status: Active
- Type: Thrust

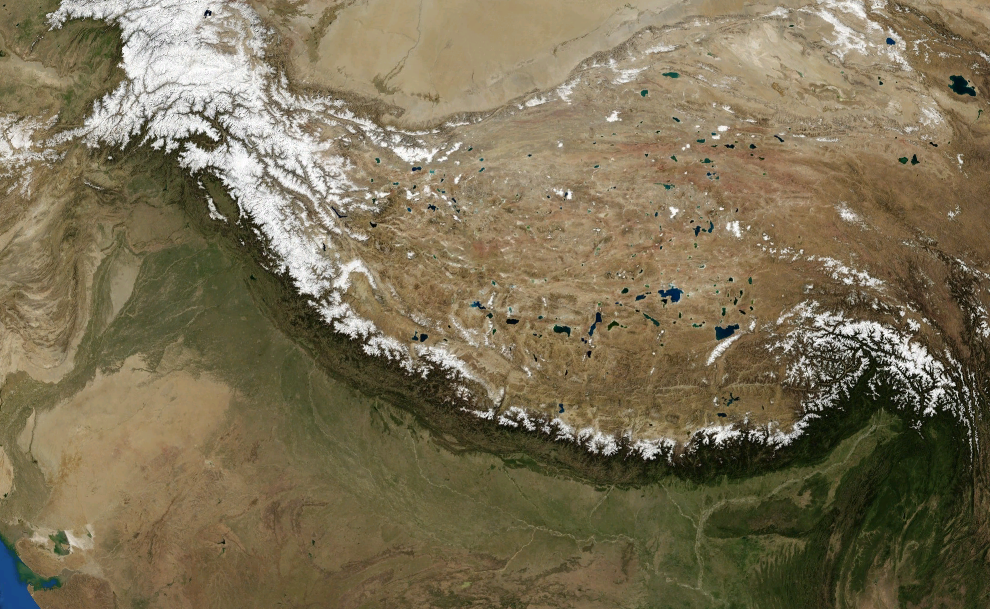
Figure 1. Satellite view of the Himalayas. The Main Frontal Thrust run parallel to the glaciated peaks, north of the Indo-Gangetic Plain.

The Main Frontal Thrust (MFT), also known as the Himalayan Frontal Thrust (HFT), is a geological fault in the Himalayas that defines the boundary between the Himalayan foothills and Indo-Gangetic Plain. The fault is well expressed on the surface thus could be seen via satellite imagery. It is the youngest and southernmost thrust structure in the Himalaya deformation front. It is a splay branch of the Main Himalayan Thrust (MHT) as the root décollement.

== Background ==
It runs parallel to other major splays of the MHT, the Main Boundary Thrust (MBT) and Main Central Thrust (MCT). The Sunda Megathrust, which extends from the Banda Islands to Myanmar, is joined with the MFT. The fault strikes in a northwest-southeast direction and dips at an angle of 20° to 30° in the north.

The Main Boundary Thrust is another major thrust fault in the Himalaya orogenic wedge that was active in the Cenozoic. It runs parallel to the MFT with a spacing distance of about 20 km.

== Shortening rate ==
Shortening rate varies across the MFT; these figures provide the speed in various locations.

Region	Rate (mm/yr)	Notes
Pakistan	14 ± 4	Minor components within the Himalayas also account for shortening.
Northwestern India	12 ± 2	
Nepal	21 ± 1.5	
Bhutan	17.5 ± 2.5	

== Seismic activity ==
The MFT accommodates almost the entire rate of subduction of the Indian Plate; numerous large earthquakes have occurred along this fault, and is expected to produce more in the future. Many earthquakes associated with the MFT has resulted in visible ground ruptures, as seen in the Bihar earthquake of 1934 and 1505 magnitude 8.2–8.8 earthquake.
