= List of aftershocks of the April 2015 Nepal earthquake =

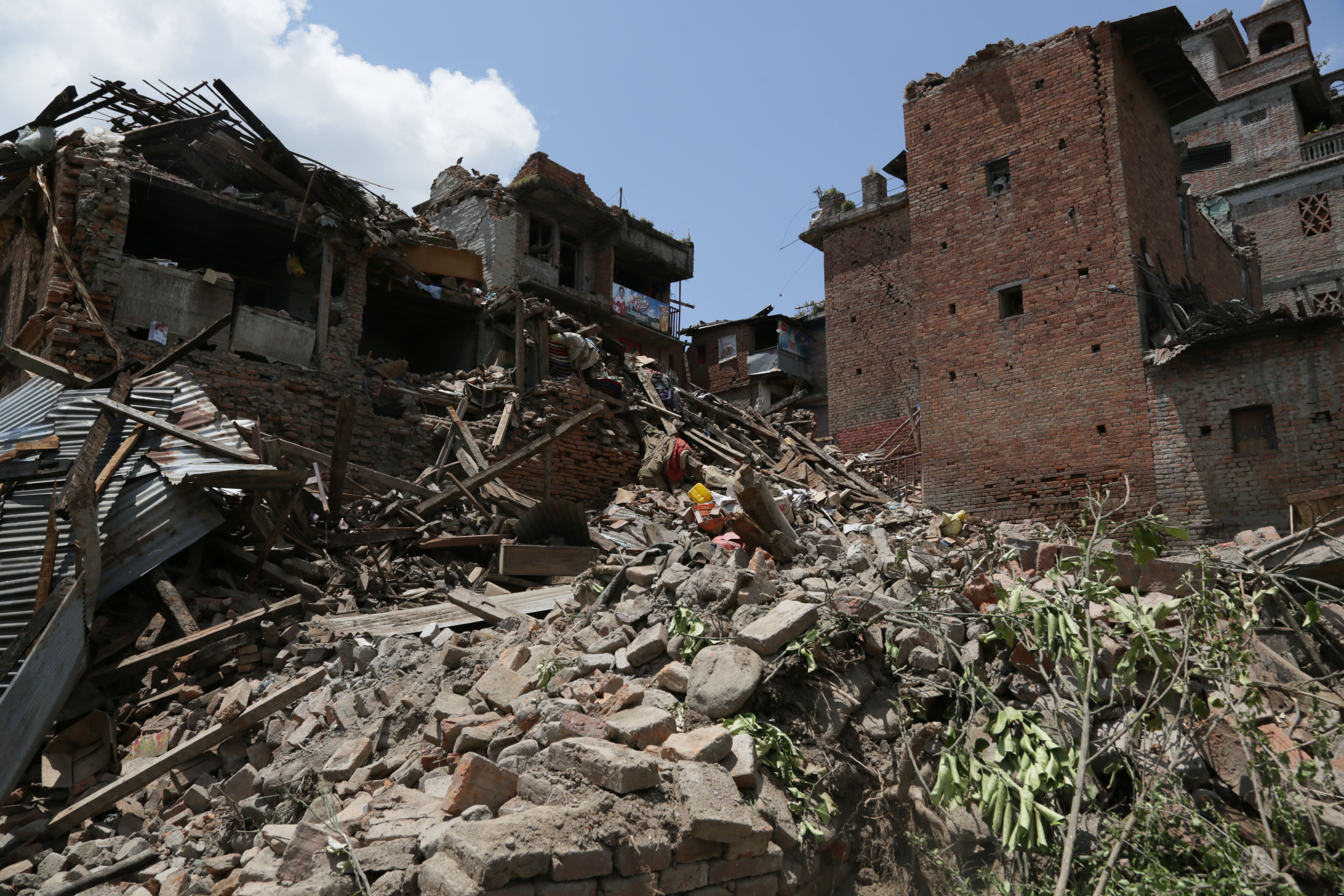
Houses destroyed by 2015 Nepal earthquake

Aftershocks of 2015 Nepal earthquake

The following is a list of aftershocks that occurred after the earthquake in Nepal on 25 April 2015. There was some seismic activity in the Jumla district before the main shock. However, they are not foreshocks to the main shock. As of 7 June 2015, over 304 aftershocks have occurred. The large number of aftershocks after the earthquake is considered normal by seismologists.

According to seismologist Roger Musson, the standard pattern for aftershocks is that the biggest aftershock will be one day after, and one magnitude less. Thus, the 6.7 magnitude aftershock on 26 April 2015 following the 7.8 magnitude main shock would fit this pattern. It is highly unlikely that the earthquake was a foreshock preceding an even larger earthquake. Therefore, an earthquake larger than 7.8 in the near future after 25 April 2015 is not expected.

== List of aftershocks 5.0 and higher ==
The list below is incomplete and maybe inaccurate for some aftershocks. Note: The list below shows bigger earthquakes only.

#	UTC timestamp	Date	Time (Note: Times are Nepal Standard Time (NST): UTC + 05:45.)	District	Mag.	Impact	ISC # (Note: International Seismological Centre event identifier.)	Ref.
Main	2015-04-25 06:11:19	25 April	11:56	Gorkha	7.9	9,061 deaths; 23,447 injured	607208674	
01	2015-04-25 06:38:42	25 April	12:22	Sindhupalchowk	5.5		607260063	
02	2015-04-25 06:45:20	25 April	12:30	Gorkha	6.6		607260065	
03	2015-04-25 06:56:34	25 April	12:41	Rasuwa	5.7		607260068	
04	2015-04-25 07:07:59	25 April	12:52	Rasuwa	5.0		607208681	
05	2015-04-25 07:47:02	25 April	13:32	Tibet	5.1		607208683	
06	2015-04-25 08:16:59	25 April	14:02	Sindhupalchowk	5.2		607211764	
07	2015-04-25	25 April	14:05	Gorkha	5.1			
08	2015-04-25	25 April	14:14	Gorkha	5.2			
09	2015-04-25	25 April	14:40	Kavrepalanchowk	5.7			
10	2015-04-25	25 April	14:48	Rasuwa	5.3			
11	2015-04-25	25 April	15:02	Tibet	5.9			
12	2015-04-25	25 April	15:15	Sindhupalchowk	5.5			
12	2015-04-25	25 April	18:29	Gorkha	5.5			
13	2015-04-25 17:42:50	25 April	23:27	Tibet	5.4			
14	2015-05-12 07:05:19	12 May	12:50	Dolakha	7.3	218 died, 2500+ injured	610588278	
15	2015-05-12	12 May	13:20	Dolakha	6.3			
16	2015-05-24 21:38:41	25 May	03:23	Gorkha	5.0			
17	2015-05-26	26 May	22:52	Rasuwa	5.0			
18	2015-05-29	29 May	15:44	Dhading	5.2			
19	2015-06-11	11 June	21:57	Sindhupalchowk	5.3			
20	2015-06-13	13 June	07:06	Dolakha	5.2			
21	2015-06-17	17 June	06:14	Sindhupalchowk	5.2			
22	2015-06-17	17 June	08:00	Sindhupalchowk/Tibet	5.1			
23	2015-06-20	20 June	18:08	Rukum	5.4			
24	2015-06-29	29 June	05:42	Ramechhap	5.0			
25	2015-07-02	2 July	07:41	Sindhupalchowk	5.0			

== Notes ==
1. The list uses data from National Seismological Centre of Nepal, not of US Geological survey. The magnitude is local magnitude.
2. The earthquake of 12 May 2015 was an aftershock of Gorkha earthquake and not a separate earthquake.
3. All times shown below (including the ones for Tibet) are in Nepal Standard Time and in 24-hour format. Seconds are not shown in all times below.
4. All dates are in the DD Month Year format (Little-endian).
5. Please note that a significant number of aftershocks are missing in this list for the date between 27 April and 12 May.
