= 1930 Bago earthquake =

Earthquake in Myanmar

- Location within Myanmar
- UTC time: 1930-05-05 13:46:01
- ISC event: 907352
- USGS-ANSS: ComCat
- Local date: 5 May 1930
- Local time: 20:18:01 MST
- Magnitude: M_{w} 7.4
- Depth: 35 km (22 mi)
- Epicenter: 17.860°N 96.430°E
- Fault: Sagaing Fault
- Type: Strike-slip
- Areas affected: Burma, British India (present-day Myanmar)
- Max. intensity: RFS IX (Devastating tremor)
- Tsunami: 1.06 m (3 ft 6 in)
- Casualties: 550–7,000 fatalities

An earthquake affected Myanmar on 5 May 1930 with a moment magnitude (M_{w}) of 7.4. The shock occurred 35 km (22 mi) beneath the surface with a maximum Rossi–Forel intensity of IX (Devastating tremor). The earthquake was the result of rupture along a 131 km (81 mi) segment of the Sagaing Fault—a major strike-slip fault that runs through the country. Extensive damage was reported in the southern part of the country, particularly in Bago and Yangon, where buildings collapsed and fires erupted. At least 550, and possibly up to 7,000 people were killed. A moderate tsunami struck the Burmese coast which caused minor damage to ships and a port. The earthquake was felt over 570,000 km^{2} (220,000 sq mi) and as far as Shan State and Thailand; it was followed by many aftershocks including several damaging ones. A further, related, earthquake in December was similarly sized and also occurred along the Sagaing Fault.

== Tectonic setting ==
Myanmar is wedged between four tectonic plates—the Indian, Eurasian, Sunda and Burma plates that interact due to active geological processes. Along the west coast of the Coco Islands, off the Rakhine coast, and into Bangladesh, is a highly oblique convergent boundary known as the Sunda megathrust. This large fault marks the boundary between the Indian and Burma plates. The megathrust emerges from the seafloor in Bangladesh, where it runs parallel and east of the Chin Hills. This boundary continues to north of Myanmar where it ends at the eastern Himalayas.

A 1,400 km (870 mi) transform fault runs through Myanmar and connects the Andaman spreading center to a collision zone in the north. Called the Sagaing Fault, it is a boundary between the Burma and Sunda plates as they slide past each other at 18–49 mm (0.71–1.93 in) per year. It is Myanmar's largest and most active source of earthquakes, running through or close to major cities including Yangon, Naypyidaw and Mandalay. Large and damaging earthquakes occurred along the fault in 1931 (M_{s} 7.5), 1946 (M_{w} 7.3 & 7.7), 1956 (M_{s} 7.0), 1991 (M_{w} 6.9), 2012 (M_{w} 6.9) and 2025 (M_{w} 7.7–7.9). The magnitude of earthquakes on the Sagaing Fault vary across the fault zone, from M_{w} 7.0 to 8.0. The recurrence intervals also vary depending on the location along the fault; its southern segments which ruptured in 1930 have return periods of 100–150 years based on paleoseismological studies.

Destructive earthquakes have affected the area for centuries but there is limited academic research to understand their seismological characteristics. Most earthquakes in Myanmar, including large, surface rupturing events are not well understood. A large M_{w} 8.5–8.8 earthquake in 1762 ruptured a section of the Sunda megathrust off the Rakhine coast. That earthquake may have been caused by the Indian plate subducting beneath the Burma plate along the megathrust. Remnants of the subducted Indian plate beneath central Myanmar also cause intraslab earthquakes. The 1975 Bagan earthquake was caused by reverse faulting within the Indian plate at an intermediate depth of 120 km (75 mi).

== Earthquake ==
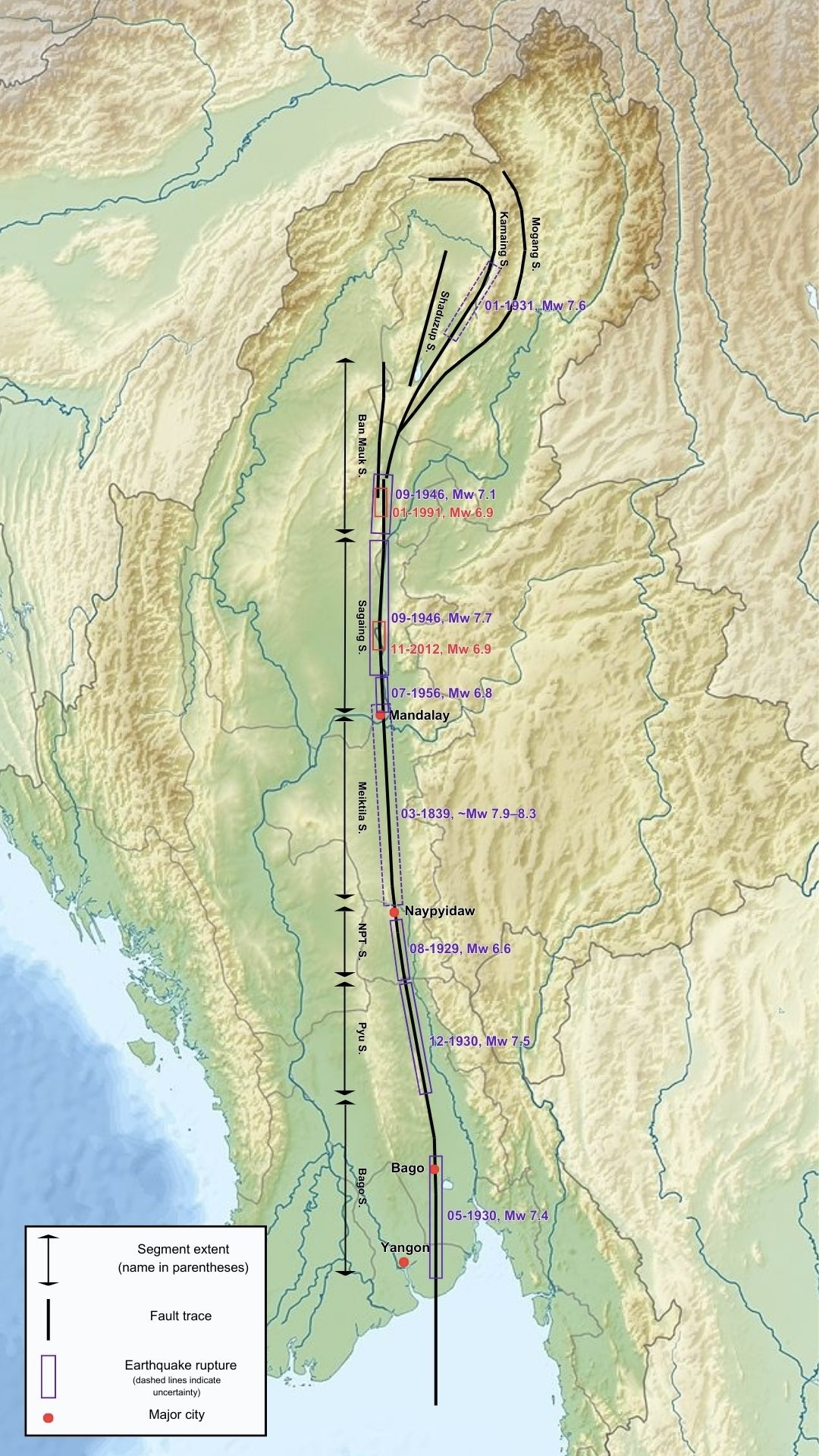
The 1930 earthquake ruptured the southernmost segment

The earthquake was recorded by seismic observatories around the planet. Geologist John Coggin Brown identified the source of the earthquake as a north-south striking fault. This structure, known as the Sagaing Fault, ruptured along 131 kilometres (81 mi) of its Bago segment, extending from the southern coast of Myanmar to roughly 20 kilometres (12 mi) north of Bago. The entire Bago segment is approximately 170 kilometres (110 mi) long, hence segment ruptured partially. By estimating a rupture length and width of 120 km (75 mi) and 15 km (9.3 mi), respectively, and averaging the slip at 3 m (9.8 ft), a magnitude of 7.4 M_{w} was computed. The magnitude is identical to that catalogued by the International Seismological Centre, which estimated a 35 km (22 mi) focal depth. There was widespread ground deformation including surface ruptures, fault scarps and fissures. A 2009 study published in Bulletin of the Seismological Society of America found surface ruptures with 20 cm (7.9 in) vertical displacements. Along the fault trace, right-lateral offsets up to 15 m (49 ft) were measured, although the earthquake only accounted for around 3 m (9.8 ft) of offset. The remaining displacement was caused by the accumulation of displacements during previous earthquakes.

The shaking characteristics and damage patterns varied across locations. Buildings and pagodas near the fault collapsed to the southeast (in Bago), east and east-southeast (in Tawa) and west-northwest (in Tongyi). These collapse patterns indicate the shaking was from an east–west to northwest–southeast direction. Further away in Insein, Yangon, Syriam, and Kyauktan, shaking was directed north–south. In Bago, was no more than 30 seconds; characterised by 3–4 seconds of gentle motion separated by a pause and then a violent northwest–southeast motion. An eyewitness observed surface waves propagating through a tennis court and people were thrown to the ground. In Yangon, the shaking lasted for 0.5–1.5 minutes; the heavy north–south shaking was preceded by gentle east–west occilations. In Dala, gentle shaking occurred for six to eight seconds before the ground shook severely. A maximum seismic intensity of IX on the Rossi–Forel scale was assigned to a pear-shaped 971 km^{2} (375 sq mi) area along the fault. Intensity VIII was assigned in Kyauktan, Thongwa, Kayan, and Kawa townships, while intensity VI–VII encompassed Toungoo and Yangon.

== Aftershocks ==
Many aftershocks were felt in Bago, Onhne and Kawa. An aftershock on 16 September damaged a police station in Pado. In December, a magnitude 7.3 earthquake struck to the north along the Sagaing Fault, killing 30 people. This event was destructive in Pyu, where many masonry buildings collapsed and railroads were twisted. Shoddily constructed buildings were also destroyed. The December earthquake was triggered by coulomb stress transfer from the previous event in May. It ruptured approximately 120 km (75 mi) of the Sagaing Fault.

== Impact ==
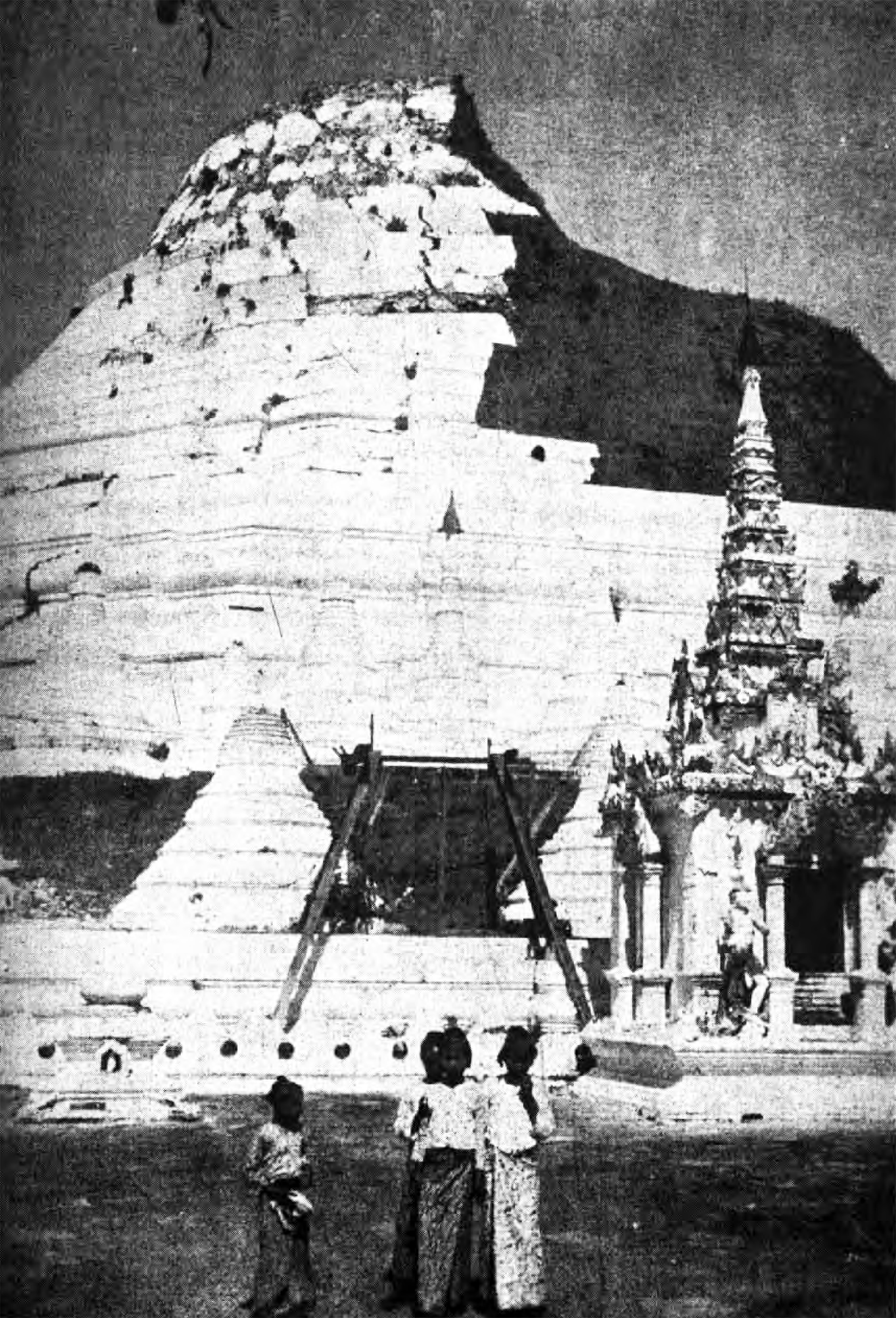
The damaged Shwemawdaw Pagoda photographed in 1936

Different sources report varying figures of the death toll. The Burma Gazette reported 500 deaths although the toll was likely greater, with The New York Times presenting a figure of 7,000. According to Reuters, citing governor Charles Innes, between 800 and 1,000 died in Bago. Between 50 and 200 deaths occurred in Yangon. A further 20,000 residents became homeless.

Most buildings in Bago's densely populated Nyaungwaing Quarter and bazaar were razed. At the cinema in Zaingganaing Quarter, a show was in progress when the earthquake occurred, collapsing the structure and killing 60 to 80 people. The Shwemawdaw Pagoda swayed about before breaking from its base and falling onto the street vendors, killing them. Other religious monuments including a mosque and the Thunpayagyi Pagoda were badly damaged or partially fell. The bazaar area was left in heaps of ruined bricks, twisted metal and charred wood after a fire. The minarets of mosques collapsed onto alleys; a municipal office was heavily damaged while a ferrocement building and high school were razed. Some buildings including a courthouse, deputy commissioner's office, hospital and jail did not sustain heavy damage.

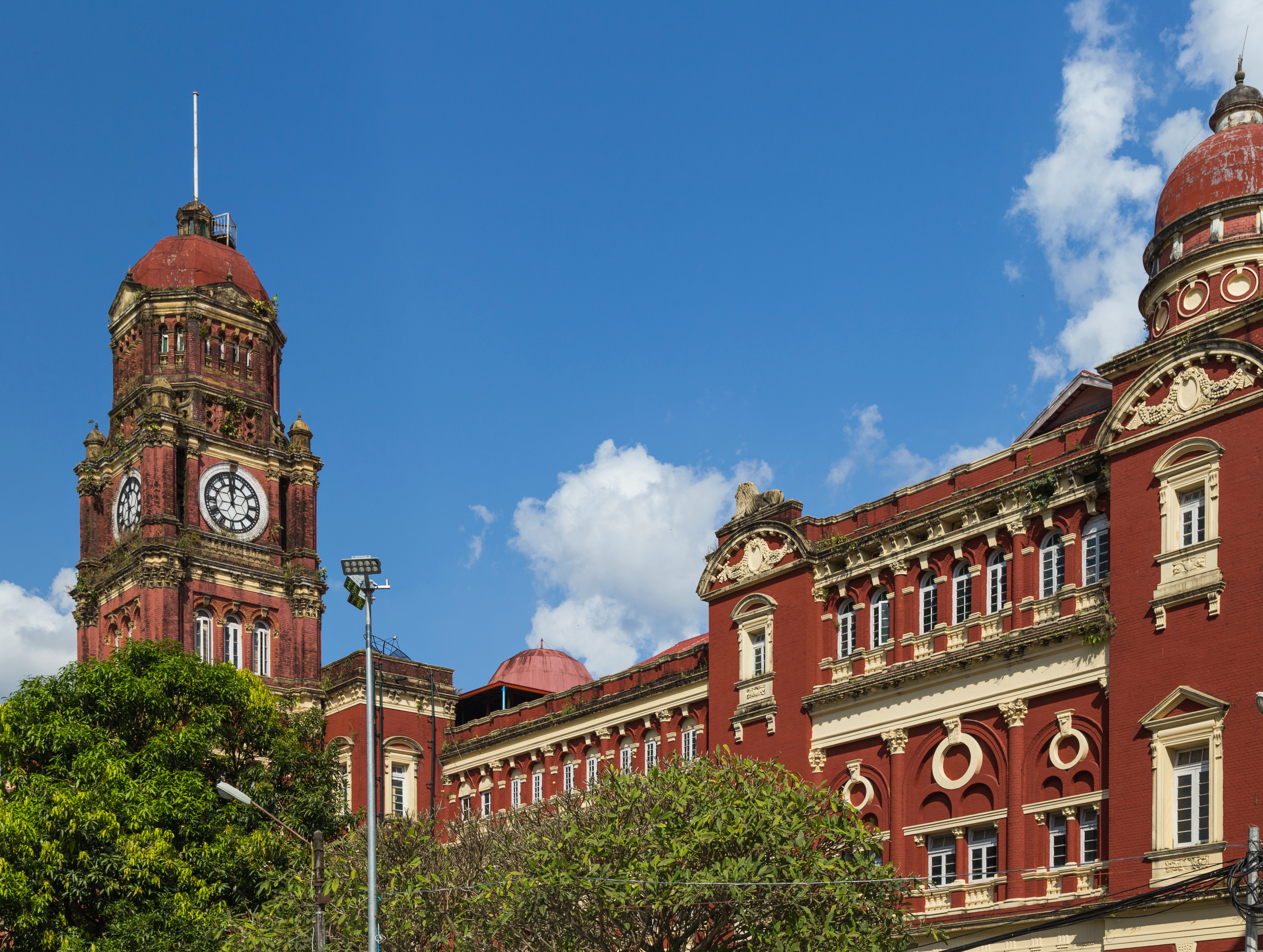
The High Court building in Yangon was badly damaged

In Yangon, the greatest damage occurred in the south which sits on alluvium deposited by the Irrawaddy River. Most casualties occurred when a mosque and five-storey building collapsed and buried everyone inside. Other buildings in the city also collapsed and buried their occupants. Along China Street, a five-storey pucca building collapsed inwards; a coolie group extracted six bodies and two survivors who later died from their injuries. The top floor of a building at the end of Mogul and Fraser streets collapsed, trapping and killing those inside. Along Fraser and 35th streets, an entire facade crumbled, killing a few people, while another at Dalhousie and Sparks streets was ruined. Additional buildings had to be torn down as their damage was so severe. The British Geological Survey building along Dalhousie Street had extensive cracking, and its interior which housed a laboratory and museum was in shambles. The High Court Building and Roman Catholic Church were also heavily damaged.

In Tawa, seven people died when two buildings totally collapsed. Some pagodas and roads were destroyed and subsidence occurred. Many ground cracks appeared—there was a large concentration of them west of the village. Meanwhile, at Khayan, a courthouse and hospital were razed while many masonry buildings and a mosque were ruined. Between 12 and 16 people died in the area. Eight of the 11 masonry structures in Thongwa were flattened. A railway station platform fissured, while abutments of the railway bridge sank and were shifted from their original positions. A collapsing brick home in Kawa left one person dead. Many homes and a police station sustained damage. In Moulmein, there was minor damage to brick structures. Homes in Thanatpin fractured while a chimney partially collapsed. In Thailand, the shock was generally felt moderately, however, in Chiang Mai, fractures formed in many brick structures and plaster broke off a hospital. Small fractures appeared in buildings with six or seven floors in Bangkok.

A tsunami with a run-up height of 1.06 metres (3 ft 6 in) was recorded along the coast and Sittaung River. However, tidal gauges in Bangladesh and India did not record the tsunami. The A.S. Oxfordshire, docked at Rangoon Harbour, was uplifted between 3 ft (0.91 m) and 4 ft (1.2 m) while others began to rock back-and-forth. The waves also caused ships to slam into the wharf and damaging port. A commander on the S.S. Queda said the vessel vibrated for 45 seconds. The S.S. Ekma rocked violently against the warf and its mooring bolts sheared under the force. People on the City of Carlisle, S. S. Berne and Kyokai Maru, ships on deeper waters, felt hard jolts and thought their vessels had collided with an object.

== Response ==
Rescue efforts in Bago were compounded by the foul odour emitted by the dead. At the partially-collapsed hospital, 45 people received treatment, though some patients died soon after. About 20 patients were referred to the Yangon General Hospital, while over 100 others were treated outdoors. By 7 May, the inferno had subsided and workers began clearing debris, an effort estimated at ₨50 thousand. Also on that day, engineers partially restored the water supply. To curb human traffic, officials enforced a curfew at 22:00, and the police targeted looters. The local government estimated the repair cost for its municipal offices at ₨2 million.

In Yangon, the General Hospital stationed their nurses to handle the influx of dead and injured. Most of the casualties were Indian women and children. More than 500 people were involved in the rescue efforts. Some managed to pull the mangled remains of those from a rubble pile at Mogul and Fraser streets. Crowds began to gather around these spots to watch the activity. Other residents in the city utilised torches and lanterns to find bodies. By June, the Muslim population began reconstruction efforts for the mosque while the Buddhist community initiated a fundraising campaign for the Shwemawdaw Pagoda. Additionally, relief workers established a temporary marketplace for vendors to sell commodities.

== Future threat ==
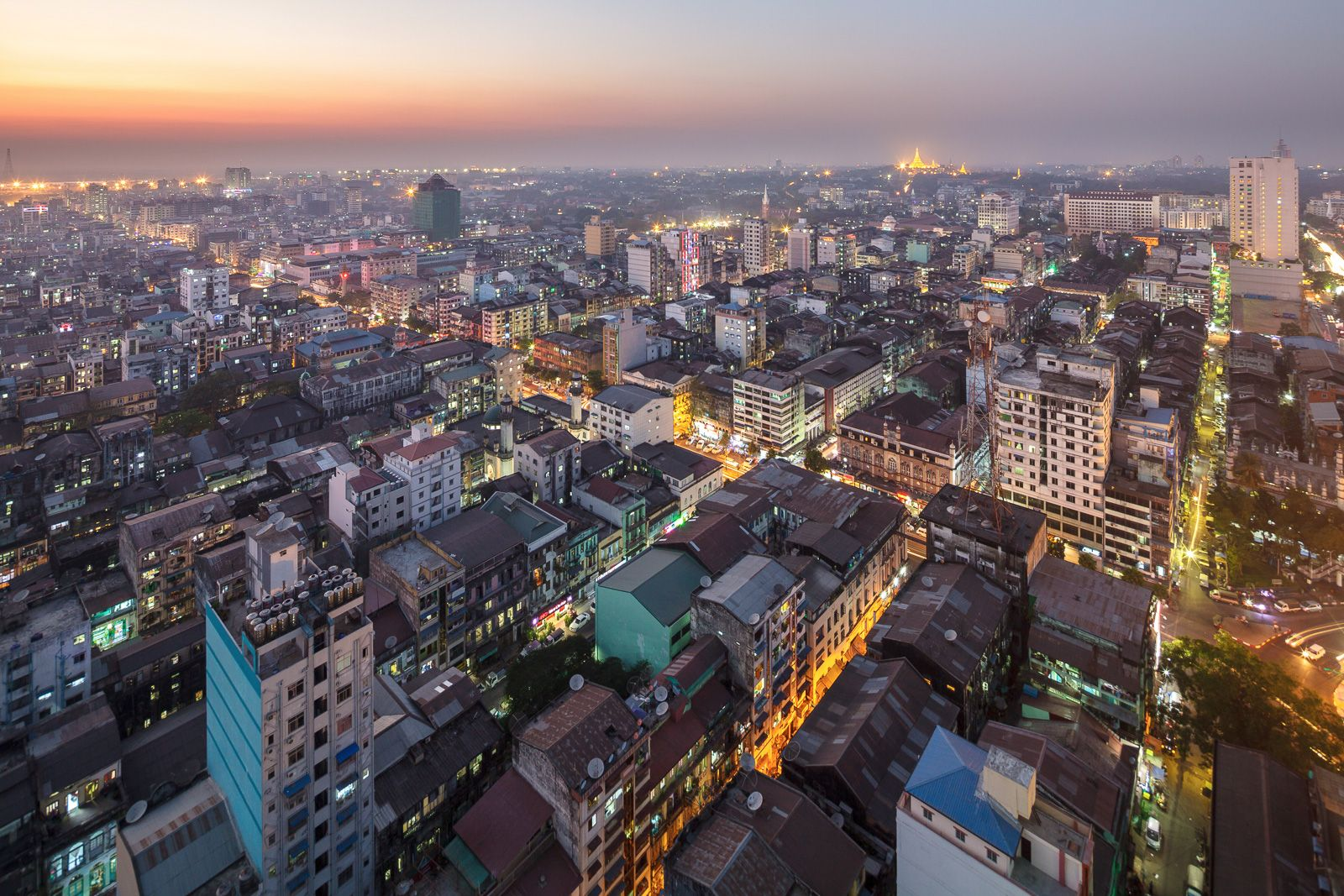
Many infrastructure in Yangon are inadequate to withstand earthquakes

The journal Geophysical Research Letters published a finding that identified three seismic gaps along the Sagaing Fault. The closest to Yangon is a 50 km (31 mi) gap between the May and December 1930 earthquakes which remains unruptured and is capable of producing a magnitude 7.0 earthquake. Extending north of Naypyidaw, a 260 km (160 mi) section corresponding to the Meiktila segment is also another seismic gap. It stretches from Nay Pyi Taw to Mandalay and could generate a magnitude 7.9 earthquake. The last known earthquake in that area struck in 1912 (M_{w} 7.7), which involved a rupture along the nearby Kyaukkyan Fault and the most recent major earthquake on the Meiktila segment occurred in 1839. A recurrence interval of 330 to 460 years was estimated along the Meiktila segment for earthquakes of magnitude 7.8–7.9. The southernmost 180 km (110 mi) offshore extension in the Andaman Sea is also a seismic gap and no large earthquakes has been associated with it. Based on the assumption that the segment has accumulated about 2 m (6 ft 7 in) of potential slip and could rupture, the minimum magnitude would be 7.7.

In the 1930s, the population of Yangon was about 200,000 to 400,000 residents—which was considered small. However, the population has grown to about 6 million. A 2008 report by the World Agency for Planetary Monitoring and Earthquake Risk stated that there were nine possible earthquake scenarios in Yangon. The Sagaing Fault and other smaller but adjacent faults pose an earthquake threat to the city. The organization said there could be over 100,000 casualties from an earthquake in Yangon. Buildings of the British colonial period were carefully constructed and are earthquake-resistant, but newer constructions do not follow seismic codes. The absence of construction-related policies and poor practices have made buildings vulnerable to earthquakes. Although some hazard maps were made in 2005, most developers do not account for earthquakes in building design. Peernan Towashiraporn, director of the Asian Disaster Preparedness Center said the impact in Yangon could be similar to that of Kathmandu during the 2015 Nepal earthquake, where 9,000 were killed.

== See also ==
- List of earthquakes in 1930
- List of earthquakes in Myanmar
