= 1930 Myanmar earthquake =

1930 Myanmar earthquake may refer to:

- 1930 Bago earthquake
- 1930 Irrawaddy earthquake – Damaging earthquake on July 18; 50 people killed
- 1930 Pyu earthquake
