= Sagaing Fault =

Seismic fault in Myanmar

- Sagaing Fault in Myanmar
- Coordinates: 21°55'06.8"N 95°59'01.6"E
- Country: Myanmar
- Cities: Yangon, Nay Pyi Taw, Meiktila, Mandalay, Myitkyina

Characteristics
- Segments: Southern section: Bago, Pyu, Nay Pyi Taw, Meiktila, Sagaing. Northern section: Tawma, Ban Mauk, Indaw, Mawlu, Shaduzup, Kamaing, Mogang
- Length: 1,400 km (870 mi)
- Displacement: 18–20 mm (0.71–0.79 in) per year

Tectonics
- Status: Active
- Type: Transform fault
- Movement: Dextral
- Age: 15-22 MYA

The Sagaing Fault is a major fault in Myanmar, a mainly continental right-lateral transform fault between the Indian plate and Sunda plate. It links the divergent boundary in the Andaman Sea with the zone of active continental collision along the Himalayan front. It passes through the populated cities of Mandalay, Yamethin, Pyinmana, the capital Naypyidaw, Toungoo and Bago before dropping off into the Gulf of Martaban, running for a total length of over 1,400 km (870 mi).

== Discovery and early studies ==
A partial visualization of an active fault trace that aligns with the present-day Sagaing Fault trace was recorded by Fritz Noetling, a geologist, in the book The Miocene of Burma published in 1900. In 1913, Thomas Henry Digges La Touche of the Geological Survey of India acknowledged the existence of a plate boundary feature along the Shan Plateau's western margin in Mandalay, including the one dividing metamorphic stratas of the Sagaing Hills from the Central Tertiary Basin. While analysing historical earthquakes in Myanmar, Harbans Lal Chhibber (1934) discovered a linear trace when joining their epicenters which he inferred to be along the same fault. In 1970, Aung Khin and others confirmed the fault's existence using geophysical techniques and a Bouguer gravity investigation from Taungoo to Thabeikkyin. That same year, Win Swe nomenclated it the "Sagaing Fault". He also made the first description of the fault in Rift features at the Sagaing Tagaung Ridge at the Fifth Burma Research Congress. He determined the fault running nearly the entire length of Myanmar from south to north had a strike-slip mechanism, and linked it to historical earthquakes. A 1991 study of the fault determined a total displacement of 203 km (126 mi) and slip rate of 22 mm (0.87 in) per year by analyzing two metamorphic units and assuming the fault's origins in the end Oligocene or early Miocene.

== Geology ==
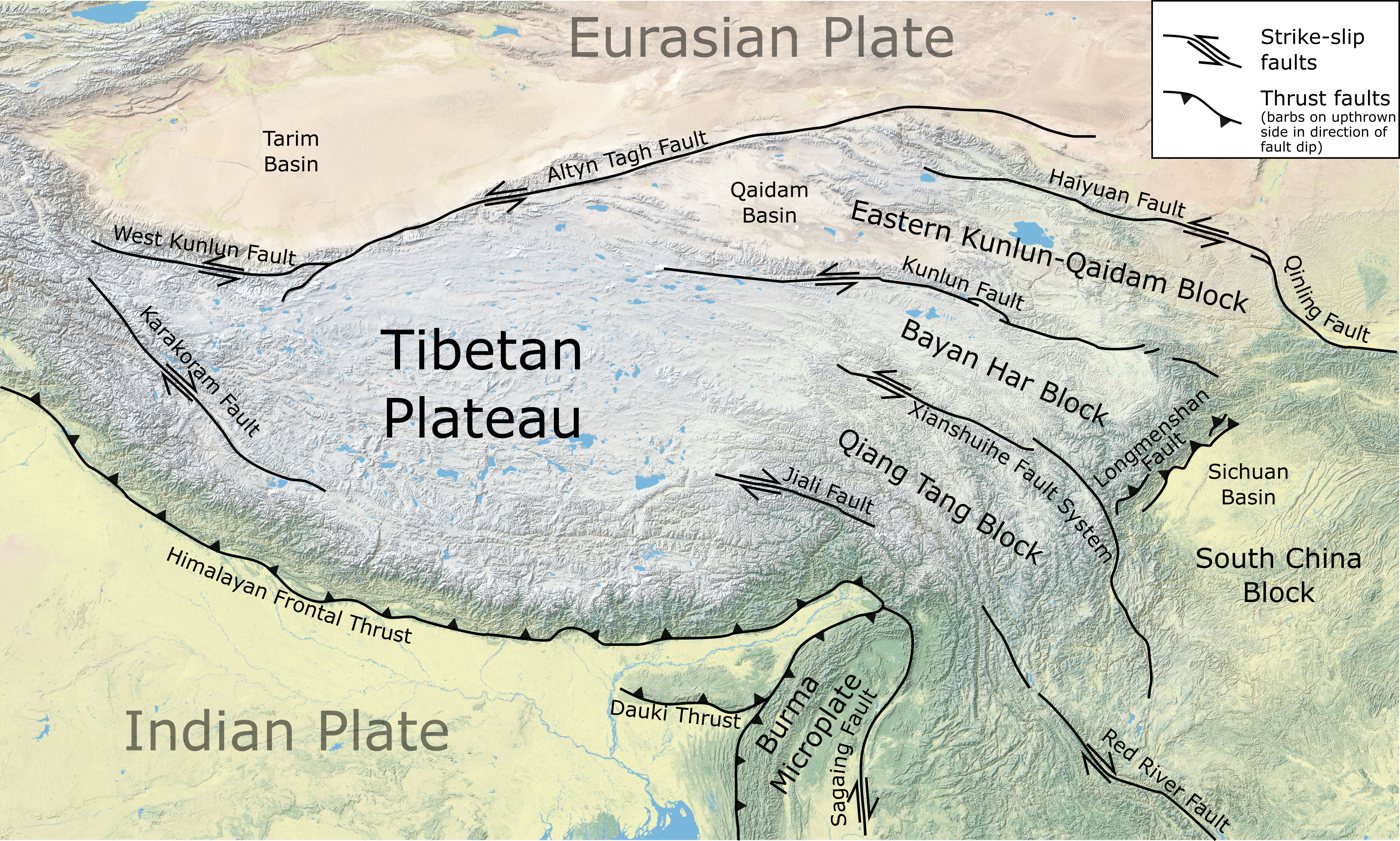
Sagaing Fault represents a boundary of the Burma Microplate (bottom)

The Sagaing Fault begins offshore in the Andaman Sea at a divergent boundary before passing through the central Myanmar basin. The fault has a relatively low topographical relief for most of its length compared to the Shan Scarp Fault to the west. Its total length from the Eastern Himalayan Syntaxis to the Andaman Sea is 1,400 km (870 mi). While the fault runs uninterrupted by large stepovers for most of its length, the northern 400 km (250 mi) branches outwards in a "horsetail" fashion into individual segments 100 km (62 mi) in width.

The total slip rate across the Indian–Sunda plate boundary is about 35 mm/yr, of which 18 mm/yr is accommodated by the Sagaing Fault, according to GPS data. The measured maximum displacement along the fault is about 100 km, although several authors have proposed between 360 km to 400 km.

=== Southern section ===
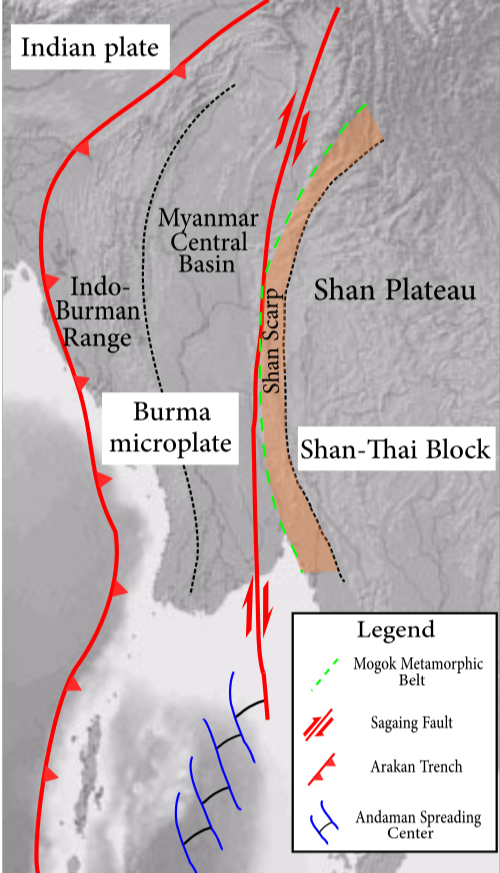
A simplified version of the regional geological features in Myanmar

The southern section comprises, from south to north, the Bago, Pyu, Naypyidaw, Meiktila and Sagaing segments. The 170 km (110 mi) Bago segment runs from Myanmar's coast, southeast of Yangon, to 18°N, where the fault experiences a sharp bend. The southern termination and offshore section remains uncertain, however, several tens of kilometers offshore, it connects to normal faults striking east–west. Approximately 100 km (62 mi) of the Bago segment ruptured during a M_{w} 7.4 earthquake in May 1930 with offsets of at least 3 m (9.8 ft).

The Pyu segment begins where the Bago segment terminated and continues 130 km (81 mi) to 19.1°N. It runs along the base of the Bago-Yoma range. There lies a terrace along the central part of the segment east of the fault trace which represents the hanging wall of a reverse fault expressed on the feature's eastern side. This feature is due to a small transpressional component where the segment experiences crustal compression. A majority of the segment ruptured during a M_{w} 7.3 earthquake in December 1930 which originated at its southern limit.

The Naypyidaw segment consists of two parallel strands that branches out at 19.1°N for its entire 70 km (43 mi). Both strands cut through channels and alluvial fans. The western strand runs east of Naypyidaw. A damaging but moderate earthquake in close proximity to the segment in August 1929 damaged railroads and bridges 40 km (25 mi) south of Naypyidaw. The International Seismological Centre assigned the earthquake M_{w} 6.5.

The Meiktila segment runs 220 km (140 mi) through a wide valley from Naypyidaw to Mandalay. This segment does not produce any dip-slip movement, evident from the absence of elevation differences across the fault. At 20°N, the fault offsets a stream by 2.4 km (1.5 mi); the largest observable offset along the segment. Although no major historical earthquake has been clearly associated with the segment, a possible contender is the 1839 Ava earthquake which destroyed the city of Inwa and caused severe damage to areas east and south of the Irrawaddy River.

The geomorphologic features of the Sagaing segment led to its discovery in 1970. This segment runs relatively linear; it runs west of the Irrawaddy River from 21.9°N to 22.6°N, where it offsets alluvial fans of the post-Pliocene. It cuts through the Singu Plateau and splits into two segments running east and west of the river. Its western strand to the north is the Tawma segment. In 1946, a M_{w} 7.7 earthquake was likely associated with the segment's northern two-thirds. This segment also ruptured during a smaller M_{w} 6.8 earthquake in 2012. The remaining portion to the south likely ruptured during the destructive M_{w} 7.1 earthquake in 1956.

=== Northern section ===
The Sagaing Fault begins to fan outwards in a "horsetail" fashion into four separate fault zones from 23.5°N. The Tawma segment runs along an east-facing scarp and streams display dextral offsets. The western strand of the Sagaing segment extends north and is represented by the Tawma segment. The trace is no longer visible at 24°N where a left stepover leads to the Ban Mauk segment 10 km (6.2 mi) west. Between the stepover is a series of northeast–southwest striking faults that cuts through a transpressional ridge. Many are shorter than 20 km (12 mi) long and some show normal-component in their slip; however their weak expression suggest small slip rates compared to the Sagaing Fault's main branches.

The Ban Mauk segment runs from 23.8°N and continues for 150 km (93 mi). Due to the rarity of clear geomorphic offsets associated with this segment, its slip rate is inferred to be low. The segment marks the boundary between the Neogene volcanics of the west and Miocene sedimentary strata of the east. At 25°N, the fault trace disappears, buried by clastic deposits of the Taungthonton Volcano to the east. At 23.7°N, the in Daw segment branches away from the Tawma segment at the Irrawaddy River's northern bank; continuing its north–northeasternly trace. A 3 km (1.9 mi) wide pull-apart basin at 24.25°N separates it from the Mawlu segment where it continues north–northwest for 90 km (56 mi). The combined length of both segments is estimated at 170 km (110 mi). Geodetic analysis of these segments revealed an annual strain accumulation of about 2 cm (0.79 in). A M_{w} 7.3 foreshock occurred along the Indaw segment three minutes before the M_{w} 7.7 earthquake in 1946.

The fault branches into three segments where the Mawlu segment terminates: the Shaduzup, Kamaing, and Mogang segments. The Shaduzup segment, the westernmost of the three, is not believe to exceed 120 km (75 mi). The lack of clear geomorphic features suggest less activity occurs on this segment. The Kamaing segment continues further north into the Naga Hills, beyond 26.7°N. Right-lateral displacements are also well-expressed in drainage channels on the eastern flank of the Naga Hills at its northern termination. The fault continues north and joins a thrust fault system associated with the Assam Valley. the Mogang segment, the most active of the three, though less seismically active than the Kamaing segment, runs in a broad arc from 24.8°N. It ends at 26.8°N where it transforms into a northwest–southeast striking thrust fault. One of these segments produced a M_{w} 7.6 earthquake in January 1931, though due to the lack of seismic data and isoseismal map its origin segment remains tentative. However, shaking was more intense along the Kamaing segment.

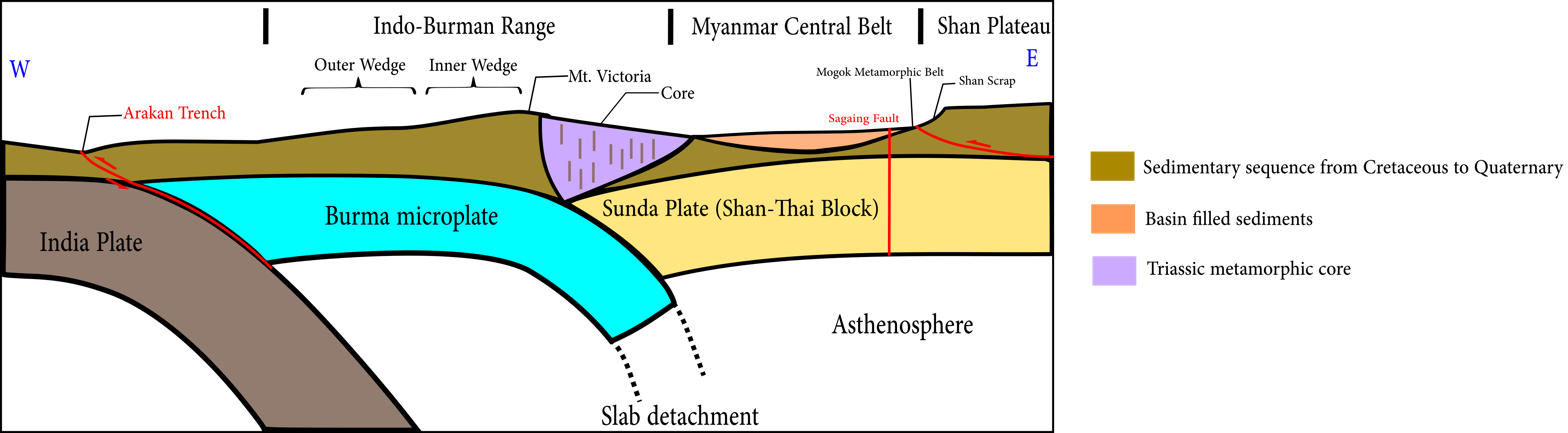
Simplified geological cross section of Myanmar at latitude 21°N. SG refers to Sagaing fault. Inspired and modified from Rangin et al. (2013) and Mitchell (1989).

== Seismicity ==
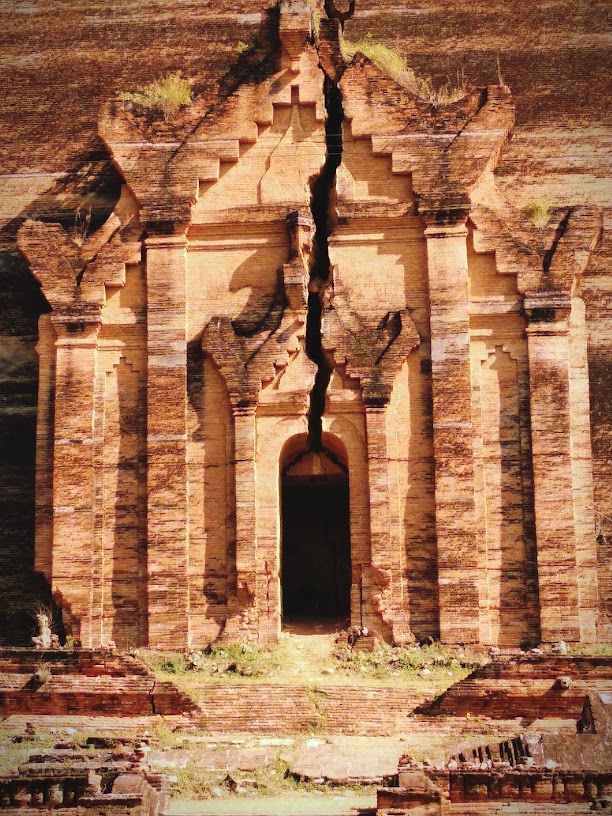
A large fracture on the Mingun Pahtodawgyi caused by the 1839 Ava earthquake

Damaging earthquakes have been associated with the fault for centuries. The great 1839 Ava earthquake killed hundreds and damaged many cities, including the then imperial capital Inwa. That earthquake is thought to have a moment magnitude of 7.9 or greater. The large magnitude would imply a rupture length of at least 300 km along the fault.

In the early 20th century, from 1929 to 1931, more than half the length of the Sagaing Fault was involved in significant earthquakes. The first earthquake—which was followed up by subsequent larger events—struck southwest of Nay Pyi Daw, and east of Thayetmyo in the Pegu Range in August 1929. There are insufficient reports of damage caused by this earthquake, although it was said that buildings were swaying and objects were displaced at Yamethin, roughly 133.6 km north of the quake epicenter. The magnitude of this earthquake was no greater than 7.0.

On the night of May 5, 1930, a large shock registering M_{w} 7.5 struck north of the city of Pegu, resulting in widespread deaths and destruction. There were no foreshocks that preceded. The earthquake had a maximum intensity of IX to X on the Rossi–Forel scale. The city of Pegu, Rangoon and several other towns were destroyed. In Pegu, fires erupted, and severe liquefaction caused further damage. Approximately 500 people died in Pegu, while 58 were killed in Rangoon. More deaths were recorded in other villages. It triggered a small tsunami which inundated villages along the coast. This is the deadliest earthquake in the 1929–1931 sequence.

Two moderate foreshocks occurred on the night of December 3, 1930. The first lasted 5 seconds, generated some panic, and was felt in Pyinmana and Rangoon. The other foreshock was described as stronger than the first but not as widespread.

Violent shaking from an M_{w} 7.3 earthquake disrupted the early morning of December 4 in Pyu, Taungoo District. The December 4 event occurred further north of the epicenter of the May earthquake, about 6.4 to 9.7 km west southwest of Pyu. Damage was severe, with a railroad being shifted off and twisted, while many buildings in the city collapsed. About 30 people were killed. The maximum intensity was assigned X on the Rossi–Forel scale. This event is not an aftershock of the May quake because it ruptured a different segment of the Sagaing Fault.

Although the May and December 1930 earthquakes occurred during this active period, they were separate events, unrelated to the activity in the northern part. The December 1930 earthquake, however, was triggered due to stress transfer from the previous event in May.

A lesser-known earthquake on July 18, 1930, in the Ayeyarwady Region killed about 50 people. According to the National Centers for Environmental Information database, there is no magnitude assigned to this event. The book Southeast Asia Association of Seismology is the only published work mentioning this event.

The largest earthquake in the sequence, an M_{w} 7.6 quake, struck on January 28, 1931, next to Indawgyi Lake, resulting in large landslides and ground failures. There were no casualties in this earthquake.

Another violent earthquake of unknown magnitude occurred 146.5 km north of Pyu. It was felt in Mandalay and Thanatpin. Six brick buildings sustained damage. On August 19, another tremor caused cracks to appear in buildings in Mandalay and lightly affected Kalaw. The city was rocked another time, resulting in the collapse of the Shwe Sandaw Pagoda in Taungoo.

Several short tremors woke people up in Taungoo, Pyuntaza and Nangyun.

Two powerful earthquakes north of Mandalay measuring M_{w} 7.3 and 7.7 occurred on September 12, 1946. The doublet earthquake sequence would remain as one of the largest in the country. Not much is known about this event due to sparse records.

Looking back at the historical records of earthquakes, the years 1906 and 1908 saw two major events in the northernmost end of the Sagaing Fault. The 1906 Putao earthquake on August 31 had an estimated moment magnitude of 7.0, and the 1908 earthquake measured M_{w} 7.5.

The 1908 earthquake resulted in stress accumulation towards the south, where the 1931 quake would occur. Similarly, the 1946 earthquake rupture segments were directly south of the 1931 rupture. The first mainshock in the 1946 doublet sequence triggered the second mainshock due to a sudden increase in stress on the fault.

Ten years later, an M_{w} 7.1 earthquake near Mandalay killed at least 40 people. That earthquake broke a segment south of the 1946 rupture. In 1991, a small seismic gap between the two 1946 ruptures generated an M_{w} 7.0 earthquake, partially re-rupturing a small section of the 1946 quakes, killing two.

The 2012 Shwebo earthquake had a moment magnitude of 6.8 and ruptured the fault north of Mandalay. A detailed and thorough evaluation of the event suggested that the rupture was 45 km long. The centroid moment tensor solution suggested the earthquake ruptured a north–south trending and sub-vertical fault that steeply dipped to the east.

CCTV footage capturing the Sagaing Fault rupturing near Thazi, Myanmar

The M_{w} 7.7–7.9 2025 earthquake was the most recent major event and one of the biggest ever recorded on the Sagaing Fault, breaking a 530 km-long section of it. This remarkably extensive event involved a partial rupture of the Sagaing segment to north of the epicenter and the total rupture of Meiktila, Nay Pyi Taw and Pyu segment towards the south. This makes it the lengthiest strike-slip rupture ever precisely measured by modern instruments, beating both the previous record of 450 km seen on the 2001 Kunlun earthquake and the estimated rupture length of the 1949 Queen Charlotte Islands earthquake (490-500 km).

== Hazard ==
The Sagaing Fault had been dubbed as an "earthquake superhighway" for its potential to generate supershear earthquakes, which occur when an earthquake's rupture velocity exceeds its S wave velocity and potentially approaches that of the P wave. This extremely high-speed rupture could inflict tremendous damage to its surroundings. A relatively straight 700-km stretch of Sagaing Fault that spans from 17°-23°N, the longest of its geometry type ever discovered, means that it is likely prone to supershear ruptures. Due to the fault's proximity to highly-populated areas, such supershear quakes could have devastating effects.

The Meiktila segment, which runs for 260 km (160 mi) from 19.2°N to 21.5°N, had been designated as a seismic gap due to the absence of major earthquake ruptures from around 1897 to 2025. At least 2 m (6 ft 7 in) of slip had accumulated along the fault, corresponding to an M_{w} 7.9 earthquake. A remaining seismic gap running 180 km (110 mi) lies in the Andaman Sea south of Yangon, which could potentially generate an M_{w} 7.7 earthquake.

== See also ==
- Geography of Myanmar
- Geology of Myanmar
- Burma plate
- Shan–Thai terrane
