= 1930 Dhubri earthquake =

Earthquake in India

- Location within India
- UTC time: 1930-07-02 21:03:43
- ISC event: 907472
- USGS-ANSS: ComCat
- Local date: July 3, 1930
- Local time: 03:23
- Magnitude: 7.1 M_{w}^{(ISC-GEM)}
- Depth: 15 km (9.3 mi)
- Epicenter: 25.93°N 90.18°E
- Max. intensity: RFS IX (Devastating tremor)

The 1930 Dhubri earthquake occurred on July 3 at 03:23 local time near Dhubri, India (then British India). It had a magnitude of M_{w} 7.1. Most of the buildings were damaged in Dhubri and the surrounding areas. This earthquake did not cause any fatalities. The maximum intensity was IX (Devastating tremor) on the Rossi–Forel scale near Dhubri.

== See also ==
- List of earthquakes in 1930
- List of earthquakes in India
