= 1930 Senigallia earthquake =

Earthquake in Italy

- Location within Alps
- UTC time: 1930-10-30 07:13:10
- ISC event: 907677
- USGS-ANSS: ComCat
- Local date: 30 October 1930
- Local time: 08:13:10
- Magnitude: 5.8 M_{L}
- Epicenter: 43.667°N 13.267°E
- Areas affected: Italy, Senigallia
- Casualties: 18 dead

The 1930 Senigallia earthquake struck the city of Senigallia in central Italy on 30 October. It occurred just a few months after the destructive 1930 Irpinia earthquake, which had caused over 1,400 casualties in the southern part of the country.

== Geology ==
The coastline in the area around Senigallia is controlled by active thrust faulting at the leading edge of the North Apennines fold and thrust belt. Movement on a blind thrust, the Senigallia Fault, has caused folding in the area around the port forming an anticline that extends about 10 kilometres (6.2 mi) parallel to the coast. The rupture area for the 1930 earthquake is thought to have measured about 12 kilometres (7.5 mi) along strike and 6.9 kilometres (4.3 mi) down dip.

== Earthquake ==
A foreshock preceded the main earthquake by a few minutes. Its loud rumble was heard by many, although the shock caused little damage. After hearing this warning noise, people fled the buildings they were in, flooding out onto the streets. Shortly after this the main shock came, at 8:10 a.m., with a magnitude of 5.9 on the Richter scale.

The earthquake affected the whole central and northwestern part of the Italian peninsula, with its epicenter near the city of Senigallia. Other major cities, such as Ancona and Fano, were damaged too, as were other settlements such as Montemarciano, Mondolfo, San Costanzo and some forty other small towns. The quake was assessed at level VIII (Severe) to IX (Violent) on the Mercalli intensity scale.

The earthquake was felt from Istria to Apulia, along the whole of Italy's Adriatic shoreline, and as far across as Naples on the opposite coast of Italy. The aftershocks which followed lasted for over a month. A small tsunami struck the harbour at Ancona, but only one moored steamship was damaged.

== Casualties ==
The earthquake took only 18 lives (14 in Senigallia, 4 in Ancona), but many more were injured. Thanks to the foreshock alerting the people, casualties were quite low, but many were wounded by debris falling from the damaged buildings.

Many families became refugees, and had to live in tents and makeshift shelters. The region's tourist industry experienced much trouble in the following years, despite government assistance.

Whole districts of Ancona, such as Capodimonte and San Lazzaro, were abandoned; the residents left for the countryside. People from Senigallia built encampments in the town's outskirts and occupied summer camps and rail coaches.

== Damage ==
Many towns reported severe damage. In San Costanzo, 25 houses collapsed, and twice as much were damaged beyond repair. 450 buildings needed restoration work, but no one was killed, and only one inhabitant was wounded.

In Mondolfo, the damage was worse. The 15-second shock destroyed 60 houses, and 39 were severely damaged. Another 540 displayed cracks in the walls, while 20 people were injured.

In Fano, the shock was much shorter (due to the different composition of the ground), about five seconds, but 86 houses suffered critical, 1197 severe and 2880 light damage, while six people required medical assistance.

Marotta, Mombaroccio, Cartoceto, Saltara, Candelara, Sant'Ippolito, Sorbolongo, Urbino, Fossombrone and Sant'Andrea di Suasa all reported some damage. More severely affected were Monteporzio, Fratte Rosa, Serrungarina and Urbania.

The old town of Senigallia, rich in monuments and businesses, was practically destroyed: the city lost its importance as a harbor and trade hub of the Adriatic Sea, along with its cultural heritage. The stone building decorations were mostly replaced by concrete or plaster fillings, compromising the look of the city center. The Misa River, used as a harbor channel, had to have new concrete embankments and lost its scenic attractiveness. Rebuilding worsened the damage; most repairable buildings were demolished to make way for new construction. The outcome was a decline in city population, importance and tourist appeal. The population shrank 70% over the next five decades.

== See also ==
- List of earthquakes in 1930
- List of earthquakes in Italy
