= 1839 Ava earthquake =

Earthquake in British India

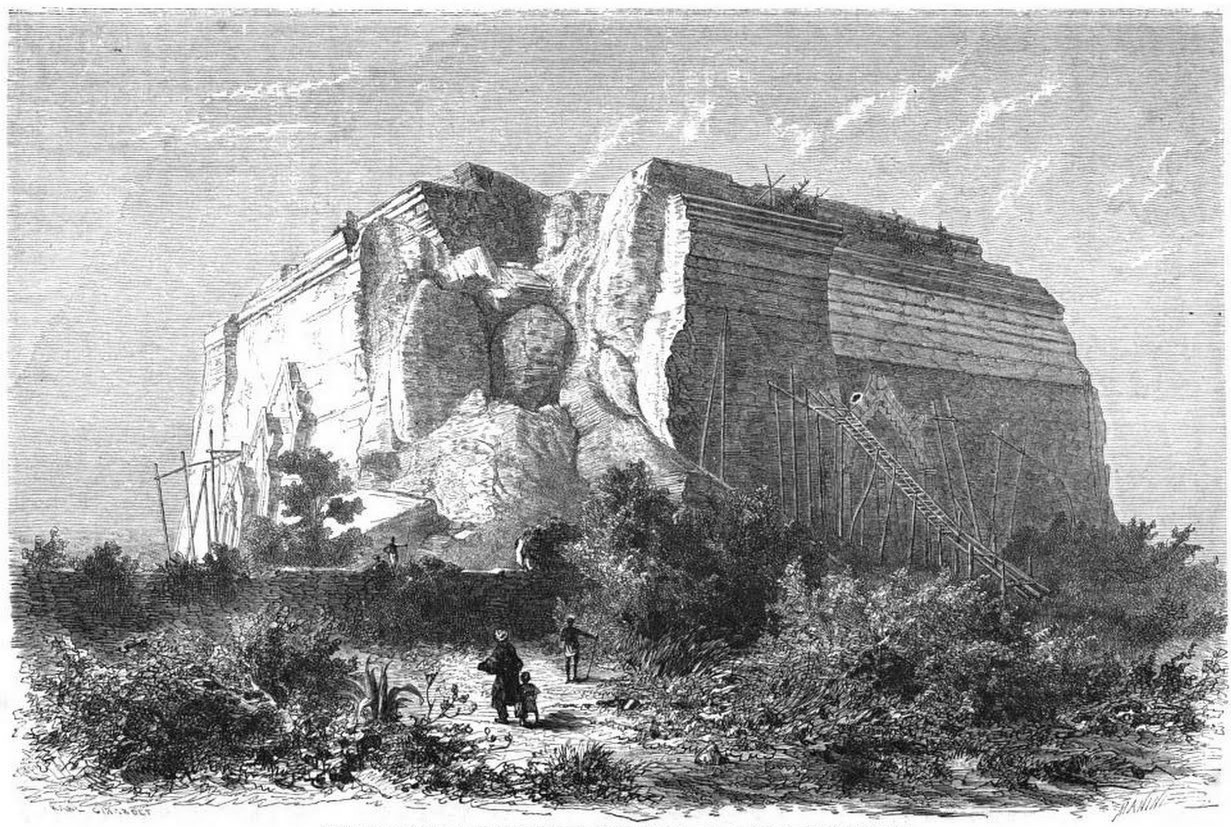

- Location within Southeast Asia
- UTC time: 1839-03-23 24:30
- Local date: 23 March 1839
- Local time: 04:00
- Magnitude: 7.9–8.3 M_{w}
- Epicenter: 21.9°N 96.0°E
- Fault: Sagaing Fault
- Areas affected: Konbaung dynasty (present–day Myanmar)
- Max. intensity: MMI XI (Extreme)
- Foreshocks: Yes
- Aftershocks: Yes
- Casualties: 300–400 dead

The 1839 Ava earthquake, also known as the Amarapura earthquake or Inwa earthquake, was a disastrous seismic event that struck present-day central Myanmar on March 23. This earthquake with an estimated moment magnitude as high as 8.3, was one of the largest in the country, since 1762. It was assigned a maximum of XI (Extreme) on the Modified Mercalli intensity scale, and was felt in Rangoon and Bhamo. Damage was enormous in Ava, resulting in the death of hundreds.

== Tectonic setting ==
Myanmar is wedged between four tectonic plates; the Indian, Eurasian, Sunda, and Burma plates, that interact due to active geological processes. Along the west coast of the Coco Islands, off the Rahkine coast, and into Bangladesh, is a highly oblique convergent boundary known as the Sunda megathrust. This large fault marks the boundary between the Indian and Burma plates. The megathrust emerges from the seafloor in Bangladesh, where it runs parallel and east of the Chin Hills. This boundary continues to north of Burma where it ends at the eastern Himalayas.

The Sagaing Fault is a mostly continental transform fault that runs through Burma and connects the Andaman spreading center to the collision zone in the north. It accommodates motion between the Burma and Sunda plates as they slide past each other at a rate of 18 to 49 mm/yr. The fault runs the entire length of the country for over 1,200 km and continues its trace into the Andaman Sea. The Sagaing Fault is Burma's largest and most active source of seismic threat, running through or close to major cities like Yangon, Nay Pyi Daw and Mandalay. Several large and damaging earthquakes have occurred on this fault in historical times. In 1946 the 180 km (110 mi) long Sagaing segment produced two major earthquakes but there are no records of its impact. Ten years later, in 1956, a magnitude 7.1 earthquake struck close to the city of Mandalay, re-rupturing the 1839 rupture zone for about 60 km (37 mi). Meanwhile, the 260 km (160 mi) long Meiktila segment has not experienced any major earthquake since 1839 and is considered a seismic gap. This seismic gap ruptured during a M_{w} 7.7 earthquake on 28 March 2025.

== Earthquake ==
The Meiktila and Sagaing segment of the fault ruptured during this earthquake for a length of 400 km (250 mi), corresponding to a magnitude 8.1–8.3 earthquake, although little research has been conducted to provide further constraints. On the basis for its overall lack of seismic activity, the Meiktila segment is believed to have ruptured during the earthquake. This segment runs from Nay Pyi Taw to Mandalay, a length of about 260 km (160 mi). Remote sensing and field observation revealed a maximum displacement of 5–7 m (16–23 ft) along the trace of the 1839 rupture just outside Mandalay. This would place the magnitude at 7.4–8.0+ and generate a ~300 km (190 mi) rupture.

Researchers at National Taiwan University combined lidar and macroseismic data from historic accounts to estimate its magnitude at ~M_{w} 7.9 and rupture length to be 285–325 km (177–202 mi). The 1839 earthquake ruptured two segments; the Meiktila segment in the south and Sagaing segment in the north. They estimated 5.5 m (18 ft) of displacement on the Sagaing segment while slip on the Meiktila segment was around 3.8 m (12 ft). The felt area based on the Modified Mercalli intensity was larger than the 1912 Maymyo earthquake (M_{w} 7.7) and similar in area to the 2002 Denali earthquake (M_{w} 7.9). The maximum assigned Modified Mercalli intensity was XI (Extreme).

== Impact ==
The mainshock was preceded by a large foreshock in 1838, which also damaged the capital. The damage reported in Inwa was so severe that the formal capital was moved to nearby Amarapura. In Mingun, a stupa sustained serious damage as a result of shaking. British officials in Myanmar recorded catastrophic damage and liquefaction in Mandalay and the surrounding area. Many pagodas collapsed during the event. Chasms and fissures more than 10 ft (3.0 m) wide were seen in Amarapura and nearly every brick building was reduced to rubble. Some villages were swallowed up as a result of liquefaction. By a contemporary British estimate, about 300–400 people died. The shock also reversed the flow of the Irrawaddy River, where the currents became violent and overflowed its banks. It was felt for thousands of miles away from the epicenter, as far as Dhaka, Kolkata, and Bangkok.

== Gallery ==
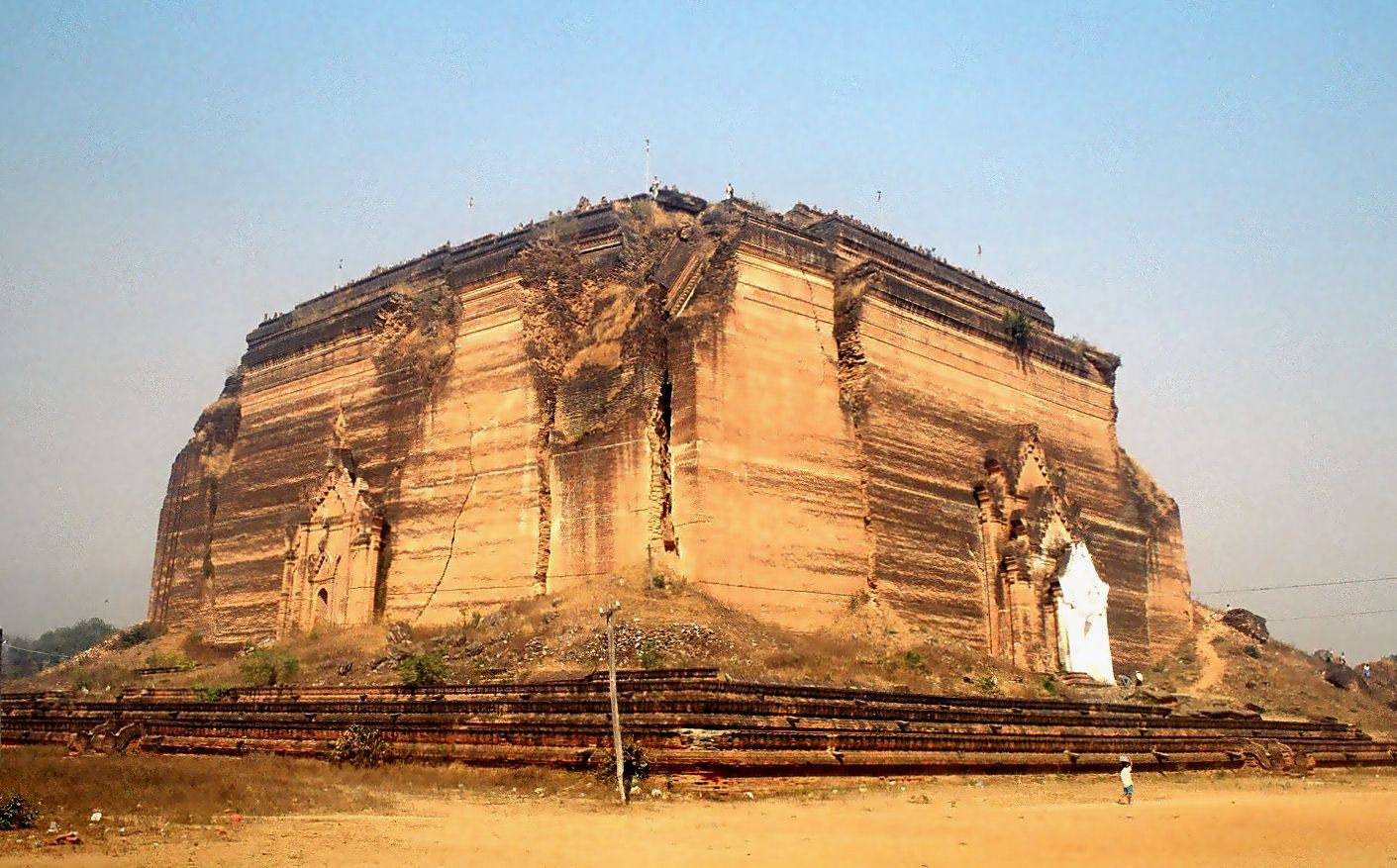
Large cracks in the incomplete Mingun Pahtodawgyi caused by the earthquake

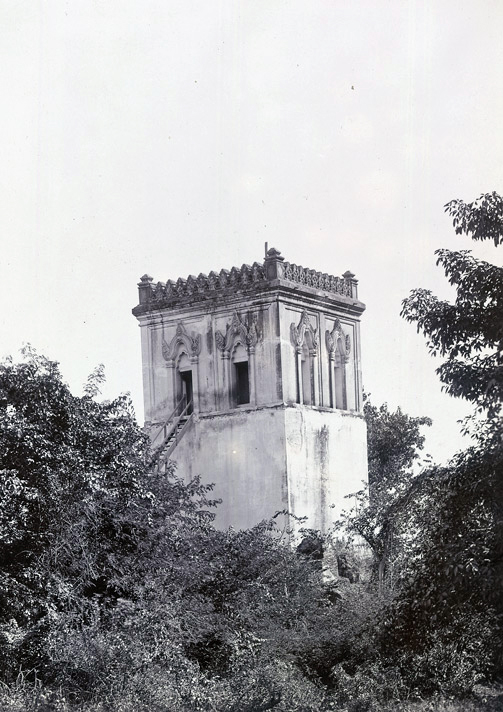
Nan Myint Tower slightly tilted due to ground effects from the tremor

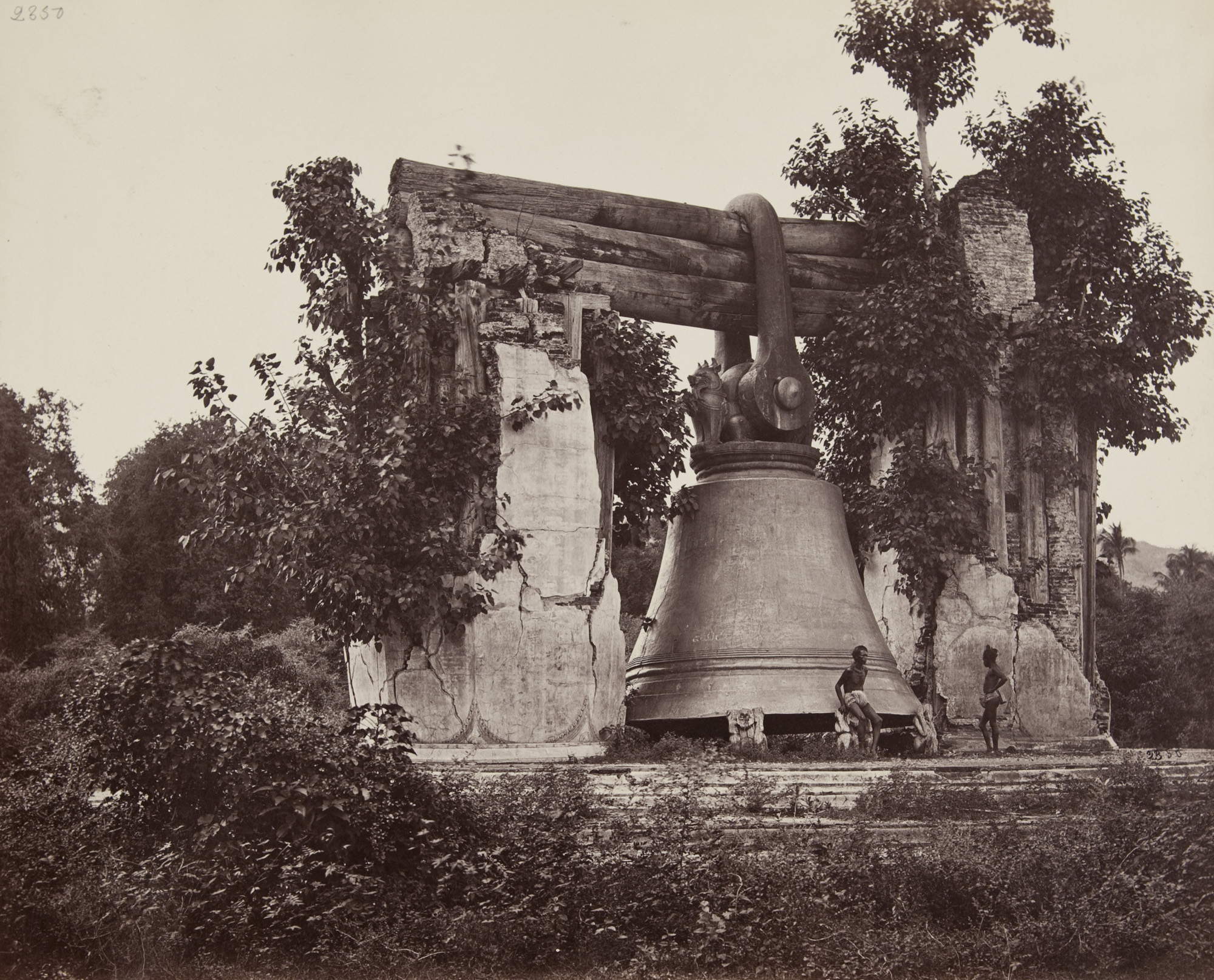
The Mingun Bell resting on the ground after losing its supports to the quake, pictured in 1873

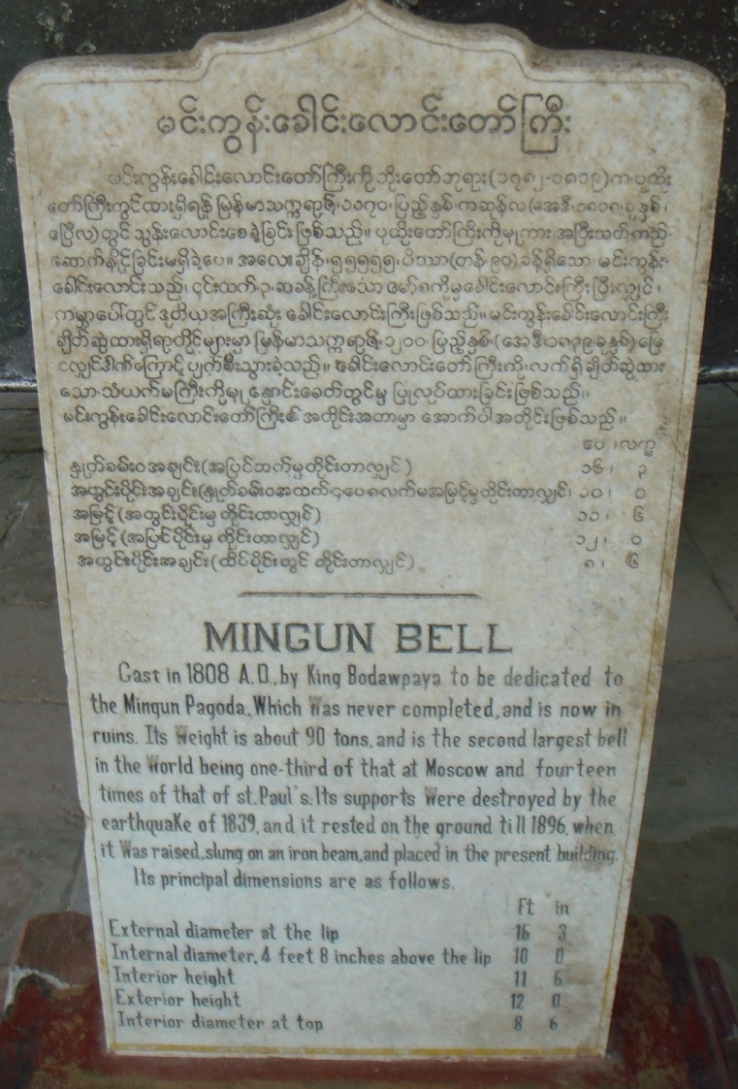
A plaque that stands beside the Mingun Bell

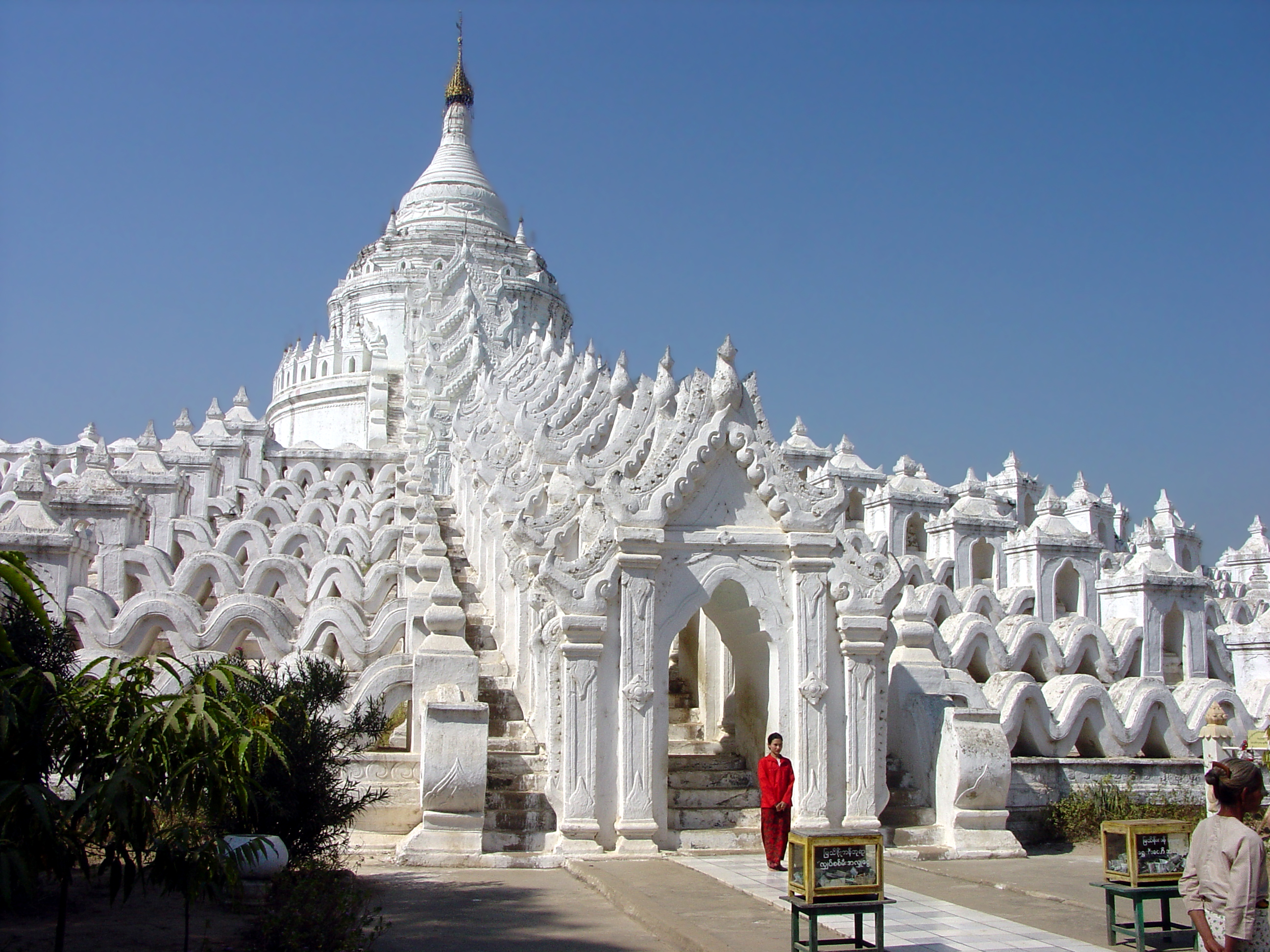
The Hsinbyume Pagoda in 2014. Extensive restoration was done by Mindon Min in 1874 after the earthquake.

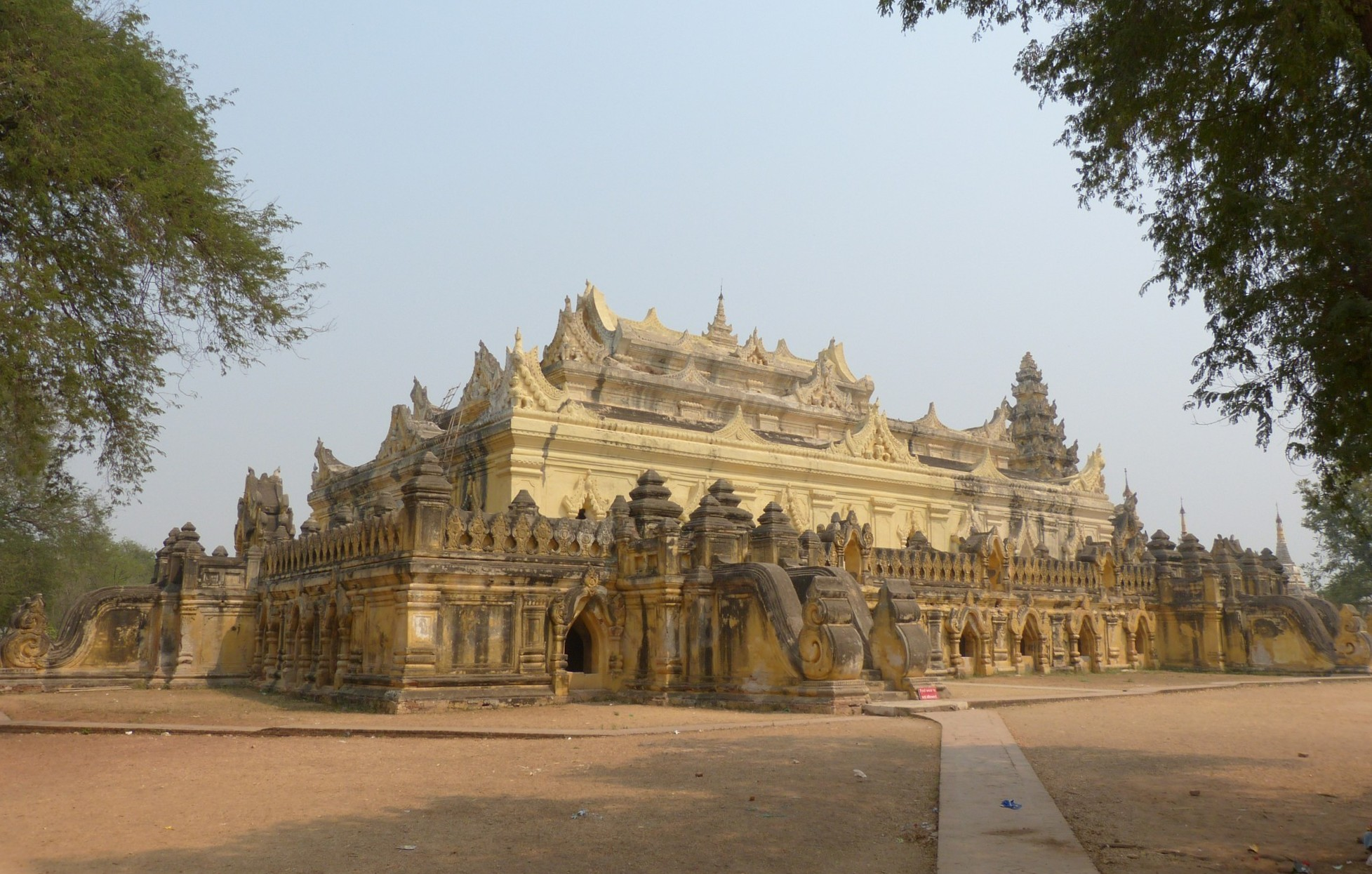
The Maha Aungmye Bonzan Monastery after repair works

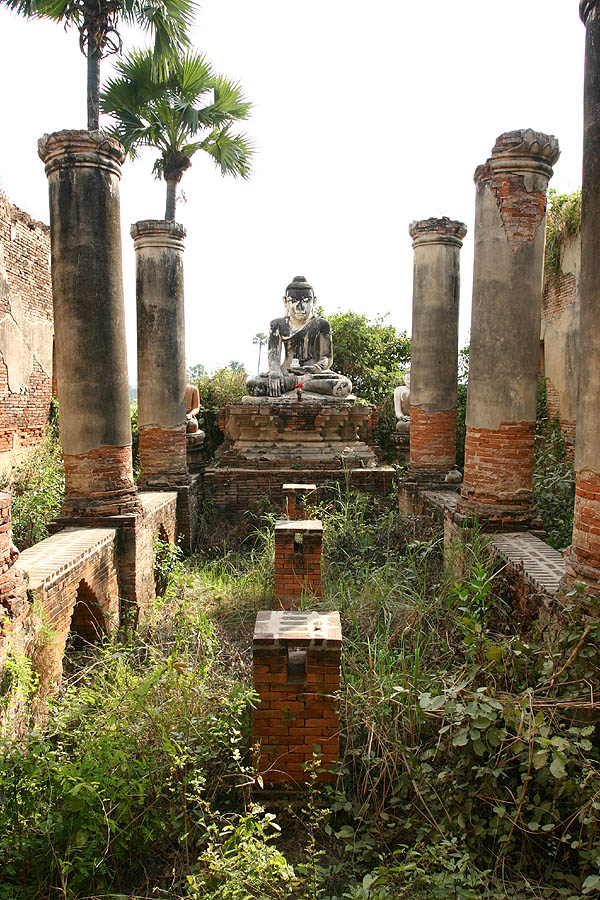
Preserved ruins from the ancient capital

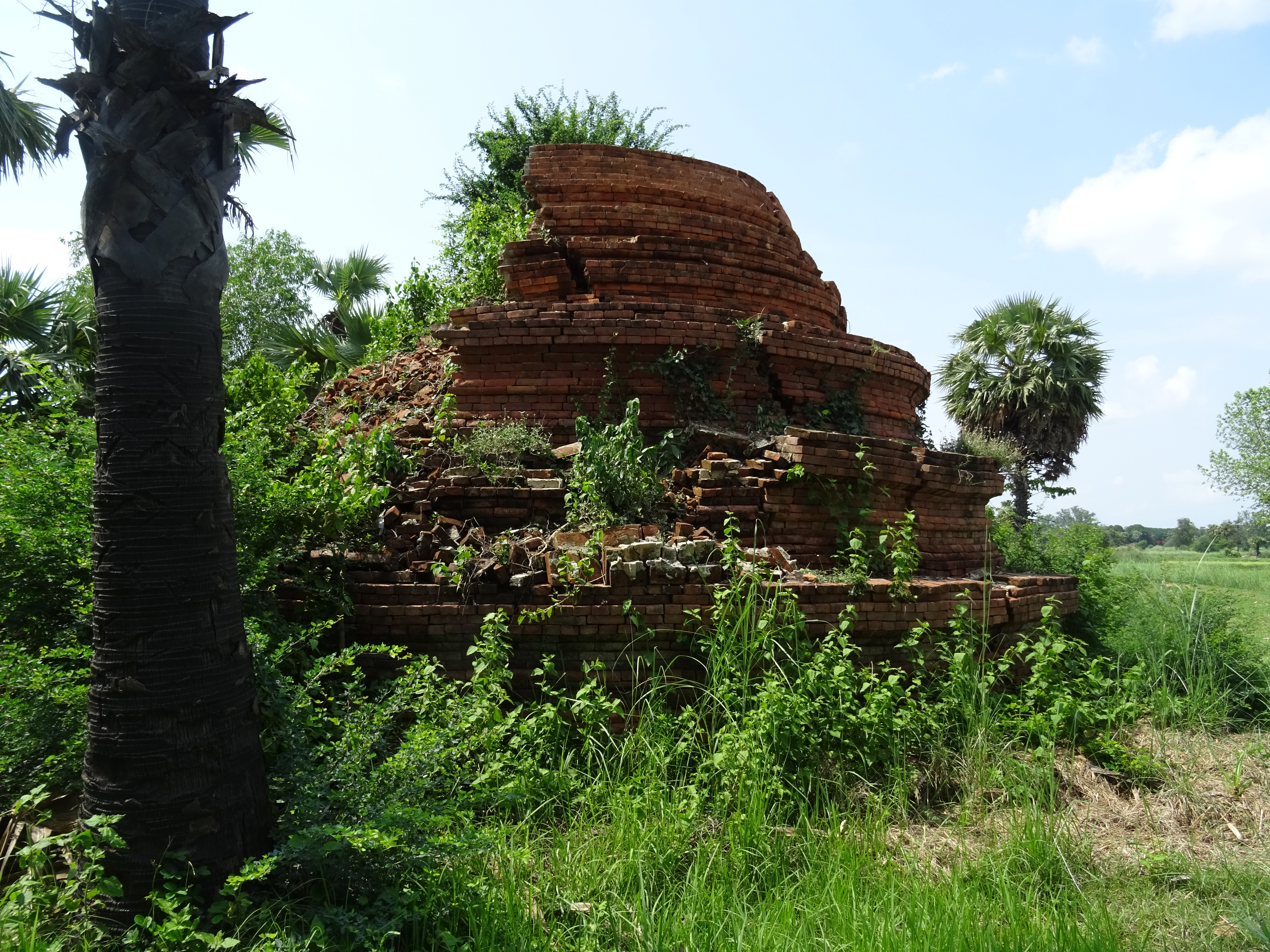
Overgrown ruins of a stupa

== See also ==
- 2025 Myanmar earthquake
- List of earthquakes in Myanmar
- List of historical earthquakes
