= Tanna Fault =

Coordinates: 35°05′47″N 139°01′04″E

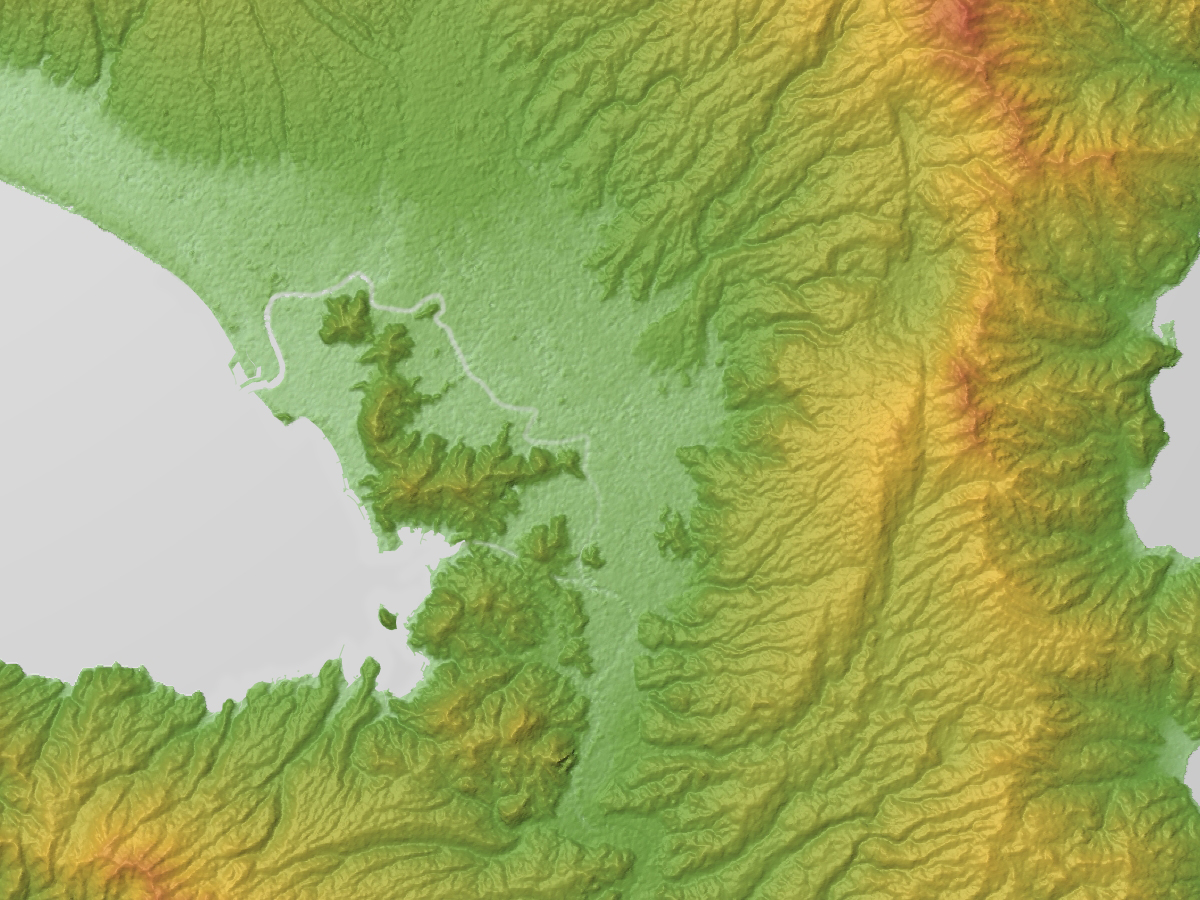
Relief Map. Tanna Fault (right)

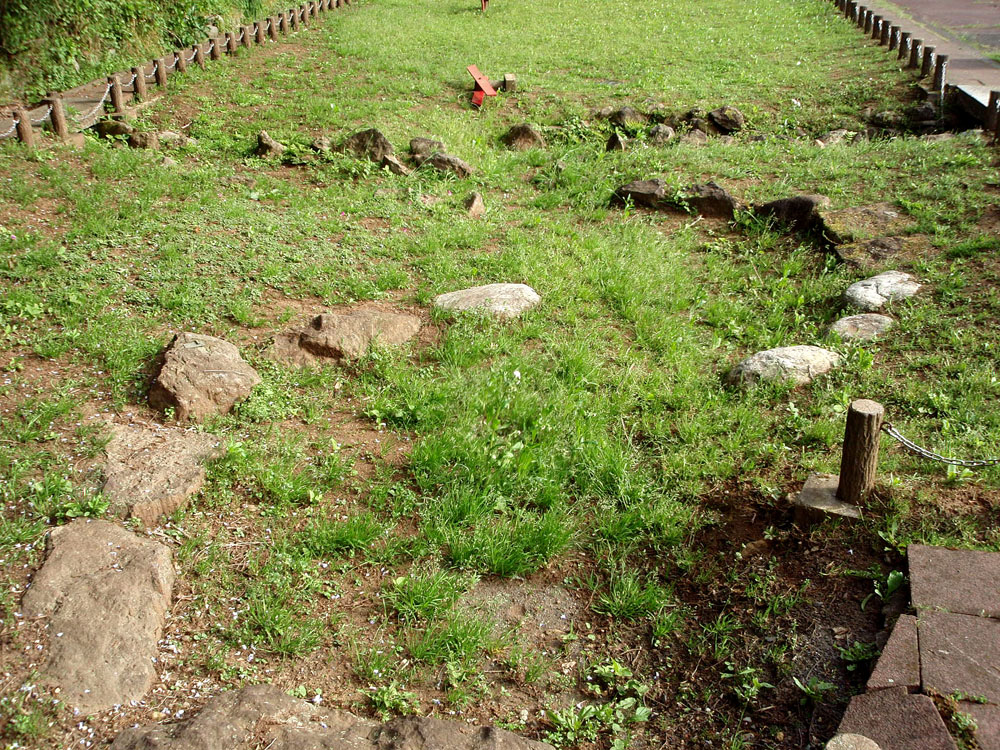
Tanna Fault surface rupture

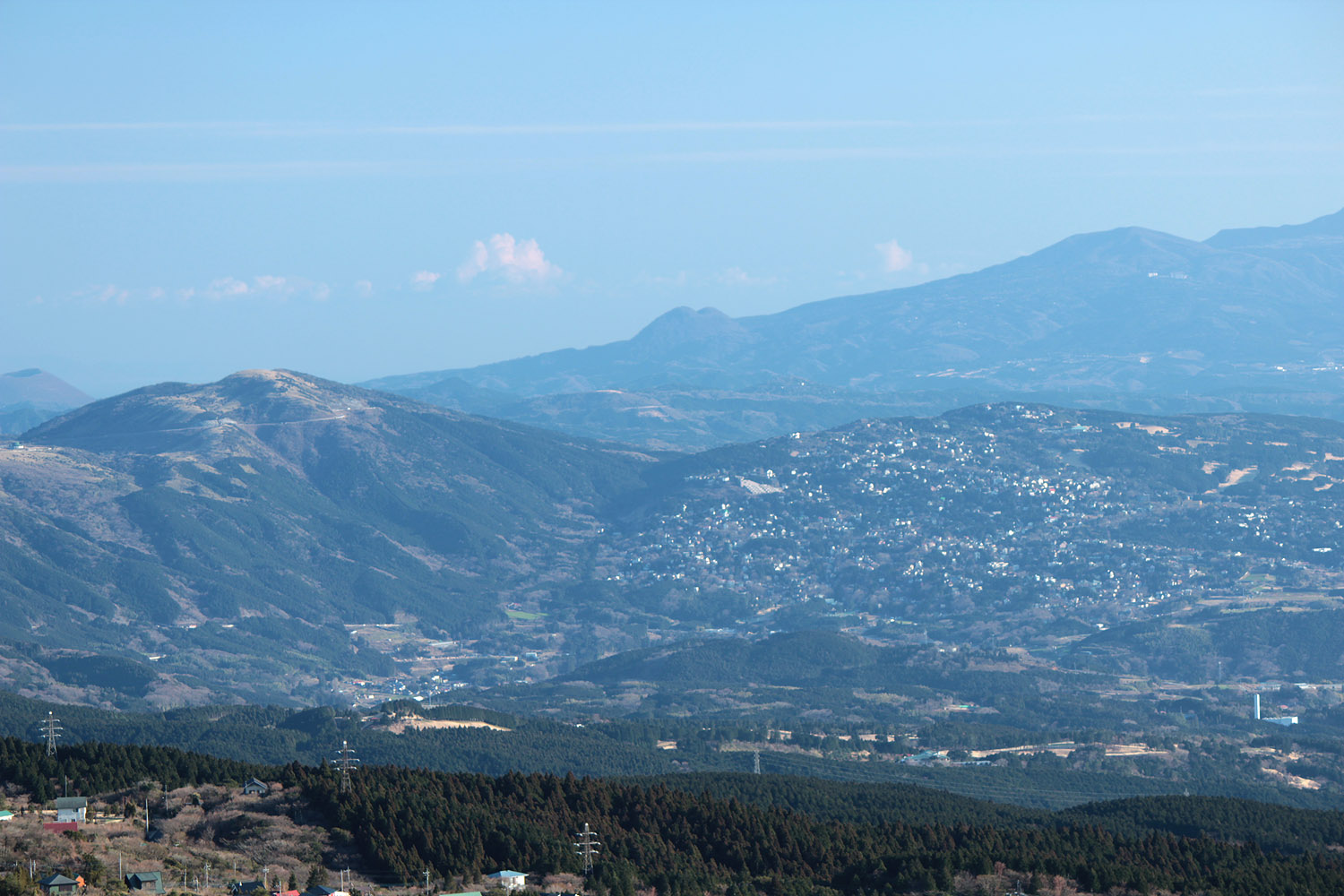
Ravine of Tanna Fault viewed from N

Tanna Fault (丹那断層, Tanna Dansō) is a left lateral strike-slip fault which runs along the northeast side of Izu Peninsula south 30 km to Izu City in Japan. It was responsible for the magnitude 7.0 1930 North Izu earthquake (北伊豆地震).
