= 1946 Sagaing earthquakes =

Earthquakes in Myanmar

- Location within Myanmar
- UTC time: 1946-09-12 15:17:23
- 1946-09-12 15:20:28
- ISC event: 898579
- 898580
- USGS-ANSS: ComCat
- ComCat
- Local date: September 12, 1946
- Magnitude: 7.3 M_{w}, 7.9 M_{s}
- 7.7 M_{w}, 7.8 M_{s}
- Depth: 15.0 km (9.3 mi)
- Epicenter: 22.35°N 96.24°E
- Fault: Sagaing Fault
- Type: Strike-slip

The 1946 Sagaing earthquakes (also known as the Wuntho earthquakes) struck central Burma at 15:17 local time on 12 September. The first earthquake measured a magnitude of 7.3 M_{w} and was followed by a 7.7 M_{w} earthquake. Both events remain some of the largest in the country since the 1762 Arakan earthquake.

== Tectonic setting ==
Both the mainshock and aftershock occurred along the Sagaing Fault; a continental transform fault boundary that links the Andaman Spreading Center to the south and the Main Himalayan Thrust to the north. It defines the boundary between the Burma plate and Sunda plate. The Sagaing Fault is the most active geological structure in the country and poses significant risks to major cities such as Yangon, Mandalay, and Naypyidaw. Another major tectonic feature in Myanmar is the Sunda Megathrust that runs off the coast of Western Myanmar and the Kabaw Fault that traces the foothills of the Arakan Mountains and Indo-Burman Range.

== Earthquakes ==
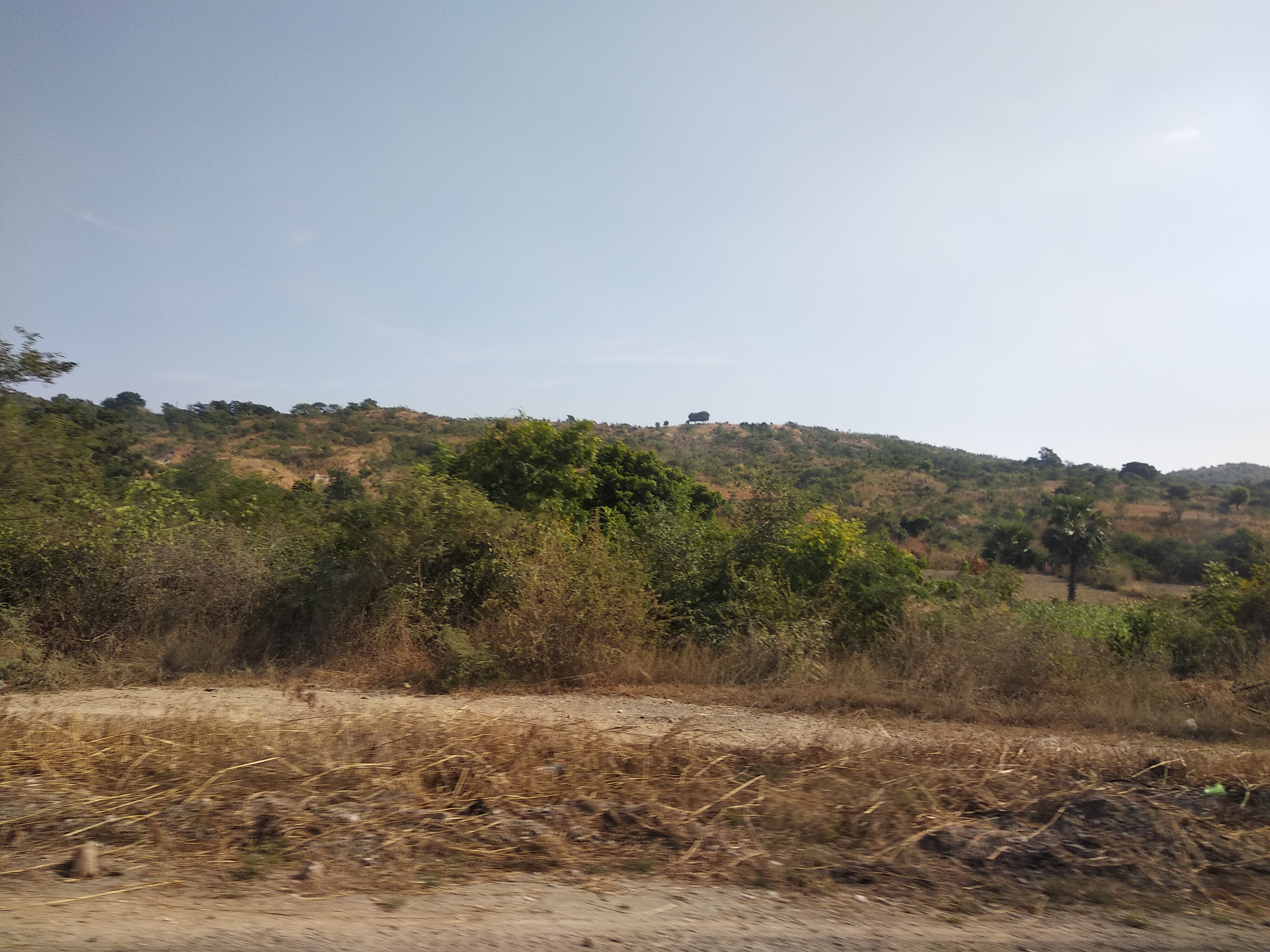
A pressure ridge along the Sagaing Fault, obstructed by vegetation, outside Mandalay. This section of the fault likely ruptured in the 1956 event.

The M_{w} 7.3 earthquake ruptured along the Sagaing Fault. It had a rupture length of approximately 80 kilometres (50 mi), and possibly as long as 155 kilometres (96 mi) along the Indaw segment. A second shock of magnitude M_{w} 7.7 came three minutes later and ruptured south of the first event for a length of 185 kilometres (115 mi). The latter earthquake ruptured along the Sagaing segment, through the villages of Tagaung and Thabeikkyin.

From observing the historical records of earthquakes, the years 1906 and 1908 saw two major events in the northernmost end of the Sagaing Fault. The 1906 Putao earthquake on August 31 had an estimated moment magnitude M_{w} of 7.0, and the 1908 earthquake measured M_{w} 7.5. Coulomb stress transfer to the south from the 1906 quake triggered rupture of the fault in the stressed area in 1908.

The 1908 earthquake resulted in the accumulation of stress towards the south, where the future 1931 M_{s} 7.7 earthquake would take place. Similarly, the 1946 earthquake rupture segments were directly south of the 1931 rupture. The first mainshock in the 1946 doublet sequence then triggered the second mainshock due to the sudden increase in stress levels on the fault.

Ten years later, an M_{w} 7.1 earthquake near Mandalay killed at least 40 people. That earthquake broke a 60-kilometre (37 mi) segment south of the 1946 rupture. In 1991, a seismic gap between the two 1946 ruptures generated an M_{w} 7.0 earthquake, partially re-rupturing a 49-kilometre (30 mi) section of the 1946 ruptures. Another M_{w} 6.8 earthquake in 2012 partially ruptured the Sagaing segment.

== See also ==
- List of earthquakes in 1946
- List of earthquakes in Myanmar
