= 1930 Irpinia earthquake =

July 1930 earthquake in Southern Italy

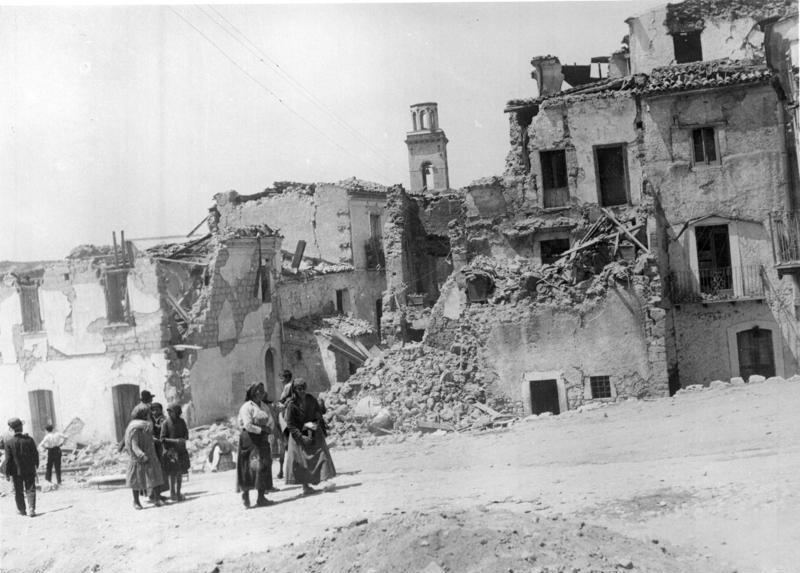

- Location within Italy
- UTC time: 1930-07-23 00:08:41
- ISC event: 907513
- USGS-ANSS: ComCat
- Local date: 23 July 1930
- Local time: 01:08:41
- Magnitude: 6.6 M_{s}
- Epicenter: 41.05°N 15.367°E
- Areas affected: Italy, Basilicata and Apulia
- Max. intensity: EMS-98 X (Very destructive)
- Casualties: 1,404 dead 4,624–7,000 injured 100,000 displaced

The 1930 Irpinia earthquake occurred at 00:08 UTC on 23 July, chiefly in an area known as Irpinia. It had a surface-wave magnitude of 6.6 and a maximum intensity of X (Very destructive). The event caused 1,404 deaths and 4,624–7,000 injuries. The epicenter was near the boundaries between the regions of Basilicata, Apulia, and Campania.

== Tectonic setting ==
The central and southern part of the Apennines has been characterised by extensional tectonics since the Pliocene epoch (i.e. about the last five million years), with most of the active faults being normal in type and NW-SE trending. The extension is due to the back-arc basin in the Tyrrhenian Sea opening faster than the African plate is colliding with the Eurasian plate. To the northeast of the Apennine chain, the foreland is in contrast affected by W-E trending strike-slip to oblique-slip faults.

== Damage ==
The area affected covered about 6,300 km^{2} (2,400 mi^{2}), lying between the Garigliano River, the Crati valley, and the Biferno and Murgia areas, including parts of high Irpinia, the Vulture area, the Sannio Hills, Salerno, Naples, the province of Matera and the highest parts of Apulia. In the worst damaged areas, about seven out of ten houses were almost completely destroyed, an outcome made worse by the poor strength of many buildings. The death toll was reported as 1,404, with some three quarters of the victims being in the province of Avellino. The death toll was low, considering the level of physical damage, a fact partly explained by the number of villagers who were away from their houses, many sleeping in the fields while working on the wheat harvest.

== Characteristics ==
The main shock was preceded by two foreshocks a few hours earlier and followed by 16 aftershocks within the first 24 hours. The greatest intensity of X (Very destructive) on the European Macroseismic Scale was recorded at Aquilonia Vecchia, Lacedonia and Villanova del Battista. Intensities of IX (Destructive) were recorded at Anzano degli Irpini, Scampitella, Castel Baronia, Melfi, Montecalvo Irpino, Rocchetta Sant'Antonio and Trevico. The area of maximum intensity is elongated in a roughly W-E direction. Analysis of historical seismograph recordings suggest that the earthquake originated from a north-dipping fault plane striking N100°E.

== See also ==
- List of earthquakes in 1930
- List of earthquakes in Italy
