= Michele Stefano de Rossi =

Italian seismologist

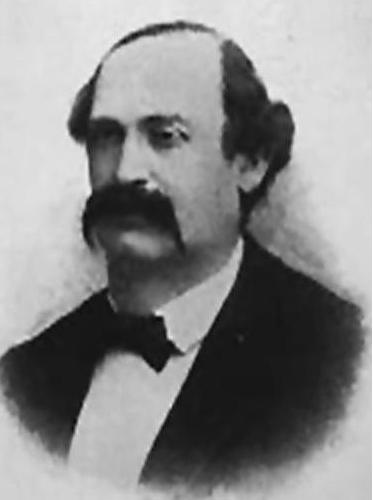
- Born: 30 October 1834; Rome, Papal States
- Died: 23 October 1898 (aged 64); Rocca di Papa, Italy
- Education: Sapienza University of Rome

Michele Stefano de Rossi (30 October 1834 in Rome – 23 October 1898 in Rocca di Papa) was an Italian seismologist. He was a younger brother of archaeologist Giovanni Battista de Rossi (1822–1894).

He received his education at the University of Rome, and during his subsequent career conducted research in the fields of archaeology, palaeontology, geology, vulcanology and seismology. He studied the topography of catacombs, and collaborated with his brother on La Roma sotterranea cristiana (1864–1877).

In the 1870s, he developed a seismic scale to reflect varying levels of earthquake intensity. Meanwhile, in Switzerland, independent of Rossi, limnologist François-Alphonse Forel (1841–1912) created a similar seismic scale. When the two scientists became aware of each other's work, a combined effort resulted in the Rossi–Forel scale for determining the intensity of earthquakes.

In 1874 he founded the Bullettino del Vulcanismo Italiano, a journal dedicated to the study of volcanoes and earthquakes.

== Publications ==
- Dell'ampiezza delle romane catacombe e d'una macchina iconografica ed ortografica per rilevarne le piante ed i livelli, 1860
- Scoperte paleoetnologiche in Castel Ceriolo presso Alessandria, 1868
- Nuove scoperte nella necropoli arcaica Albana e l'aes grave fra le rocce vulcaniche laziali, 1871
- La meteorologia endogena, 1879–82
- Programma dell'Osservatorio e archivio geodinamico presso il R. Comitato geologico d'Italia con istruzioni per le osservazioni, 1883.
