= List of earthquakes in 1930 =

Earthquakes in 1930
Approximate epicenters of the earthquakes in 1930
- 4.0–5.9 magnitude
- 6.0–6.9 magnitude
- 7.0–7.9 magnitude
- 8.0+ magnitude
- Strongest: Japan, off the east coast of Honshu (Magnitude 7.7) November 10
- Deadliest: Italy, Province of Avellino (Magnitude 6.4) July 23 1,430 deaths
- Total fatalities: 4,254

Number by magnitude
- 9.0+: 0

This is a list of earthquakes in 1930. Only magnitude 6.0 or greater earthquakes appear on the list. Lower magnitude events are included if they have caused death, injury or damage. Events which occurred in remote areas will be excluded from the list as they wouldn't have generated significant media interest. All dates are listed according to UTC time. Many earthquakes caused deaths and destruction of property. Italy and Iran bore the brunt of the casualties. Several events occurred in Burma, Japan, China and Tajikistan among others.

== Overall ==
=== By death toll ===
Rank	Death toll	Magnitude	Location	MMI	Depth (km)	Date
1	1,430	6.4	Italy, Campania	X (Extreme)	15.0	July 23
2	1,360	7.1	Iran, West Azerbaijan Province	( )	15.0	May 6
3	500	7.5	British Burma, Bago Region	IX (Violent)	35.0	May 5
4	259	6.9	Japan, Shizuoka Prefecture, Honshu	( )	15.0	November 25
5	200	5.5	China, Sichuan Province	( )	0.0	August 24
6	175	6.3	Tajik SSR, Districts of Republican Subordination	( )	0.0	September 22
7	51	6.8	Greece, southern Aegean Sea	XI (Extreme)	130.0	February 14
8	50	0.0	British Burma, Ayeyarwady Region	( )	0.0	July 18
9	42	6.0	China, Yunnan Province	VIII (Severe)	0.0	May 14
10	39	6.0	Argentina, Salta Province	VIII (Severe)	35.0	December 24
11	36	7.4	British Burma, Bago Region	( )	10.0	December 3
12	35	6.0	Albanian Kingdom, Vlore County	XI (Extreme)	35.0	November 21
13	27	6.5	New Guinea, Bismarck Sea	( )	33.0	December 23
14	25	5.0	Albanian Kingdom, Vlore County	IX (Violent)	4.0	December 2
15	18	6.0	Italy off the east coast of Italy	IX (Violent)	35.0	October 30

- Note: At least 10 casualties

=== By magnitude ===
Rank	Magnitude	Death toll	Location	MMI	Depth (km)	Date
1	7.7	0	Japan, off the east coast of Honshu	( )	30.0	November 10
2	7.5	500	British Burma, Bago Region	IX (Violent)	35.0	May 5
3	7.4	36	British Burma, Bago Region	( )	10.0	December 3
4	7.2	0	United States, Northern Mariana Islands	( )	25.0	October 24
= 5	7.1	1,360	Iran, West Azerbaijan Province	( )	15.0	May 6
= 5	7.1	0	India, Meghalaya	IX (Violent)	15.0	July 2
= 5	7.1	0	Russian SFSR, Kuril Islands	( )	110.0	July 22
= 6	7.0	0	Dutch East Indies, off the west coast of Wetar	( )	10.0	March 26
= 6	7.0	0	New Guinea, off the southwest coast of New Britain	( )	35.0	June 11
= 6	7.0	0	Dutch East Indies, Papua (province)	( )	25.0	November 9

- Note: At least 7.0 magnitude

== Notable events ==
=== January ===
January
- Strongest: 6.9 M_{w} Russian SFSR
- Total fatalities: 0

Number by magnitude
- 8.0–8.9: 0
- 7.0–7.9: 0
- 6.0–6.9: 2
- 5.0–5.9: 1

Date	Country and location	M_{w}	Depth (km)	MMI	Notes	Casualties	
Date	Country and location	M_{w}	Depth (km)	MMI	Notes	Dead	Injured
3	China, Jiangsu Province	5.5	0.0	VII	At least 51 people were hurt and some damage was caused. The depth was unknown.		51+
5	Russian SFSR, Kuril Islands	6.9	160.0				
18	New Guinea, southeast of New Ireland (island)	6.5	35.0				

=== February ===
February
- Strongest: 6.8 M_{w} Greece
- Deadliest: 6.8 M_{w} Greece; 51+ deaths
- Total fatalities: 51+

Number by magnitude
- 8.0–8.9: 0
- 7.0–7.9: 0
- 6.0–6.9: 1

Date	Country and location	M_{w}	Depth (km)	MMI	Notes	Casualties	
Date	Country and location	M_{w}	Depth (km)	MMI	Notes	Dead	Injured
14	Greece, southern Aegean Sea	6.8	130.0	XI	At least 51 people were killed.	51+	

=== March ===
March
- Strongest: 7.0 M_{w} Dutch East Indies
- Total fatalities: 0

Number by magnitude
- 8.0–8.9: 0
- 7.0–7.9: 1
- 6.0–6.9: 4

Date	Country and location	M_{w}	Depth (km)	MMI	Notes	Casualties	
Date	Country and location	M_{w}	Depth (km)	MMI	Notes	Dead	Injured
6	Greece, south of Crete	6.0	100.0				
8	Panama, north of	6.2	35.0				
10	Russian SFSR, Sea of Okhotsk	6.5	620.0				
26	Italy, Aeolian Islands	0.0	0.0	IX	Some damage was caused. The magnitude and depth was unknown.		
26	Dutch East Indies, west of Wetar	7.0	10.0				
30	Dutch East Indies, northern Wetar	6.5	10.0				

=== April ===
April
- Strongest: 6.6 M_{w} United States
- Total fatalities: 0

Number by magnitude
- 8.0–8.9: 0
- 7.0–7.9: 0
- 6.0–6.9: 2

Date	Country and location	M_{w}	Depth (km)	MMI	Notes	Casualties	
Date	Country and location	M_{w}	Depth (km)	MMI	Notes	Dead	Injured
26	United States, Rat Islands, Alaska	6.6	35.0				
28	China, Yunnan Province	6.3	35.0				

=== May ===
May
- Strongest: 7.5 M_{w} British Burma
- Deadliest: 7.1 M_{w} Iran; 1,360
- Total fatalities: 1,902

Number by magnitude
- 8.0–8.9: 0
- 7.0–7.9: 2
- 6.0–6.9: 7

Date	Country and location	M_{w}	Depth (km)	MMI	Notes	Casualties	
Date	Country and location	M_{w}	Depth (km)	MMI	Notes	Dead	Injured
1	Russian SFSR, Kuril Islands	6.7	140.0				
5	British Burma, Bago Region	7.5	35.0	IX	The 1930 Bago earthquake killed 500 people and many homes were damaged or destroyed. A tsunami was triggered.	500	
6	Iran, West Azerbaijan Province	7.1	15.0		1,360 people were killed in the 1930 Salmas earthquake.	1,360	
11	Iran, Hormozgan Province	6.0	35.0				
14	China, Yunnan Province	6.0	0.0	VIII	42 people were killed and at least 51 were injured. Many homes were destroyed.	42	51+
19	Taiwan, south of	6.5	50.0				
23	Japan, Izu Islands	6.8	115.0				
29	Colombia, Antioquia Department	6.0	220.0				
30	Dutch East Indies, Celebes Sea	6.2	300.0				

=== June ===
June
- Strongest: 7.0 M_{w} New Guinea
- Total fatalities: 0

Number by magnitude
- 8.0–8.9: 0
- 7.0–7.9: 1
- 6.0–6.9: 5

Date	Country and location	M_{w}	Depth (km)	MMI	Notes	Casualties	
Date	Country and location	M_{w}	Depth (km)	MMI	Notes	Dead	Injured
4	Dutch East Indies, Banda Sea	6.8	365.0				
11	New Guinea, southwest of New Britain	7.0	35.0				
19	Dutch East Indies, off the south coast of Sumatra	6.2	35.0				
25	Peru, Ica Region	6.4	30.0		Foreshock.		
25	United Kingdom, British Virgin Islands	6.2	35.0				
25	Peru, off the coast of Ica Region	6.6	15.0				

=== July ===
July
- Strongest: 7.1 M_{w} 2 events
- Deadliest: 6.4 M_{w} Italy; 1,430 deaths
- Total fatalities: 1,480

Number by magnitude
- 8.0–8.9: 0
- 7.0–7.9: 2
- 6.0–6.9: 3
- 5.0–5.9: 1

Date	Country and location	M_{w}	Depth (km)	MMI	Notes	Casualties	
Date	Country and location	M_{w}	Depth (km)	MMI	Notes	Dead	Injured
2	India, Meghalaya	7.1	15.0	IX	The 1930 Dhubri earthquake caused major damage.		
5	Spain, Andalusia	5.6	0.0		Some damage was caused. Depth unknown.		
13	China, Qinghai Province	6.5	10.0				
14	Guatemala, Santa Rosa Department, Guatemala	6.9	15.0				
18	British Burma, Ayeyarwady Region	0.0	0.0		50 people were killed and some damage was reported. The magnitude and depth were unknown.	50	
22	Russian SFSR, Kuril Islands	7.1	110.0				
23	Italy, Campania	6.4	15.0	X	1,430 deaths were caused by the 1930 Irpinia earthquake. 3,188 homes were destroyed.	1,430	

=== August ===
August
- Strongest: 6.8 M_{w} Taiwan
- Deadliest: 5.5 M_{w} China; 200 deaths
- Total fatalities: 201

Number by magnitude
- 8.0–8.9: 0
- 7.0–7.9: 0
- 6.0–6.9: 2
- 5.0–5.9: 2

Date	Country and location	M_{w}	Depth (km)	MMI	Notes	Casualties	
Date	Country and location	M_{w}	Depth (km)	MMI	Notes	Dead	Injured
4	Brazil, Acre (state)	6.5	650.0				
20	Taiwan, off the northeast coast	6.8	15.0				
24	China, Sichuan Province	5.5	0.0		200 people were killed and some damage was reported. Depth unknown.	200	
31	United States, off the coast of Malibu, California	5.2	15.0	VII	1 person drowned due to large waves. Some damage was caused.	1	

=== September ===
September
- Strongest: 6.9 M_{w} China
- Deadliest: 6.3 M_{w} Tajik SSR; 175 deaths
- Total fatalities: 175

Number by magnitude
- 8.0–8.9: 0
- 7.0–7.9: 0
- 6.0–6.9: 7

Date	Country and location	M_{w}	Depth (km)	MMI	Notes	Casualties	
Date	Country and location	M_{w}	Depth (km)	MMI	Notes	Dead	Injured
11	Turkey, Antalya Province	6.0	35.0				
14	New Hebrides	6.5	280.0				
21	China, Yunnan Province	6.9	15.0	VIII	Some homes were destroyed.		
22	Tajik SSR, Districts of Republican Subordination	6.3	0.0		175 people died in the event. Depth unknown.	175	
22	India, Manipur	6.2	35.0				
23	Argentina, Salta Province	6.5	150.0				
30	New Guinea, off the north coast	6.6	15.0				

=== October ===
October
- Strongest: 7.2 M_{w} United States
- Deadliest: 6.0 M_{w} Italy; 18 deaths
- Total fatalities: 19

Number by magnitude
- 8.0–8.9: 0
- 7.0–7.9: 1
- 6.0–6.9: 5
- 5.0–5.9: 1

Date	Country and location	M_{w}	Depth (km)	MMI	Notes	Casualties	
Date	Country and location	M_{w}	Depth (km)	MMI	Notes	Dead	Injured
2	Iran, Mazandaran Province	5.0	0.0		1 person was killed and some damage was caused.	1	
3	Dutch East Indies, Papua (province)	6.0	35.0				
8	New Hebrides	6.7	15.0				
24	United States, Northern Mariana Islands	7.2	25.0				
28	United States, Northern Mariana Islands	6.5	25.0		Aftershock.		
30	Italy, off the east coast	6.0	35.0	IX	The 1930 Senigallia earthquake caused 18 deaths and many homes to collapse.	18	
31	British Solomon Islands	6.5	15.0				

=== November ===
November
- Strongest: 7.7 M_{w} Japan
- Deadliest: 6.9 M_{w} Japan; 259 deaths
- Total fatalities: 294

Number by magnitude
- 8.0–8.9: 0
- 7.0–7.9: 2
- 6.0–6.9: 5

Date	Country and location	M_{w}	Depth (km)	MMI	Notes	Casualties	
Date	Country and location	M_{w}	Depth (km)	MMI	Notes	Dead	Injured
8	Celebes Sea	6.9	650.0				
9	Dutch East Indies, Papua (province)	7.0	25.0				
10	Japan, off the east coast of Honshu	7.7	30.0				
10	Dutch East Indies, Papua (province)	6.9	30.0		Remotely triggered earthquake.		
21	Albanian Kingdom, Vlore County	6.0	35.0	XI	35 people died and a further 108 were injured. 980 homes were destroyed.	35	108
24	Ecuador, Pastaza Province	6.2	100.0				
25	Japan, Shizuoka Prefecture, Honshu	6.9	15.0		259 people were killed in the 1930 North Izu earthquake. 1,285 were injured. 8,099 homes were destroyed.	259	1,285

=== December ===
December
- Strongest: 7.4 M_{w} British Burma
- Deadliest: 6.0 M_{w} Argentina; 39 deaths
- Total fatalities: 132

Number by magnitude
- 8.0–8.9: 0
- 7.0–7.9: 2
- 6.0–6.9: 9
- 5.0–5.9: 2

Date	Country and location	M_{w}	Depth (km)	MMI	Notes	Casualties	
Date	Country and location	M_{w}	Depth (km)	MMI	Notes	Dead	Injured
2	Albanian Kingdom, Vlore County	5.0	4.0	IX	25 people were killed and some damage was caused.	25	
2	British Burma, Kachin State	6.2	35.0				
3	British Burma, Bago Region	7.4	10.0		The 1930 Pyu earthquake left 36 people dead and at least 101 injured. Some homes were destroyed or damaged.	36	101+
6	United States, Andreanof Islands, Alaska	6.5	80.0				
8	Taiwan, Tainan	6.3	15.0		5 people were killed and at least 51 were injured. 297 homes were destroyed.	5	51+
13	Japan, Hokkaido	6.5	100.0				
21	Philippines, Babuyan Islands	6.9	170.0				
22	Taiwan, Tainan	5.5	0.0		Aftershock of December 8 event. 121 homes were destroyed. Depth unknown.		
23	New Guinea, Bismarck Sea	6.5	33.0		A tsunami struck the area with 27 deaths and 8 injuries being caused. 104 homes were washed away.	27	8
23	Japan, Hokkaido	6.0	150.0				
24	Argentina, Salta Province	6.0	35.0	VIII	39 people were killed and at least 101 were injured. Many homes were destroyed or damaged.	39	101+
29	Chile, Atacama Region	6.0	0.0		Depth unknown.		
