= 1930 North Izu earthquake =

- Location within Shizuoka Prefecture
- UTC time: 1930-11-25 19:02:53
- ISC event: 907761
- USGS-ANSS: ComCat
- Local date: November 26, 1930
- Local time: 04:02
- Magnitude: M_{s} 7.3
- Depth: 19 km (12 mi)
- Epicenter: 35.00°N 139.00°E
- Areas affected: Japan
- Casualties: 272 killed

The 1930 North Izu earthquake (1930年北伊豆地震, Sen-kyūhyaku-sanjū-nen Kita-Izu Jishin) occurred on November 26 at 04:02 local time. The epicenter was located in the northern Izu Peninsula, Japan. It had a magnitude of M_{s} 7.3, and was caused by the movement of the Tanna Fault (丹那断層).

== Geology ==
The Izu Peninsula is located in the northern tip of the Philippine Sea plate. However, the GPS vectors of the Izu Peninsula are almost westwards, which are different from the northwestward motion of the Philippine Sea plate. A seismically active area in the east off the Izu Peninsula might be the deformation zone between the Izu Peninsula and the main part of the Philippine Sea plate or at times be regarded as the boundary between the Izu microplate and the Philippine Sea plate. The suspected boundary may be a complex fracture zone than a simple boundary. In this view, the Izu microplate is pushed northwestwards by the Philippine Sea plate and rotates clockwise, pivoting on the base of the Izu Peninsula. The rotation causes an almost westward motion under the Suruga Bay. The interplate coupling under the Sugura Bay is not weak.

The Tanna Fault is part of the North Izu Fault Zone (or Kita-Izu Fault Zone) (北伊豆断層帯). The North Izu Fault Zone is about 32 kilometres (20 mi) long, lying in the NNE-SSW direction. This fault zone is predominantly of left-lateral strike-slip faulting with an estimated left-lateral slip rate of about 2 metres (6.6 ft) per 1000 years. The 1930 North Izu earthquake was identified with the movement of the Tanna Fault. The focal mechanism was left-lateral strike-slip faulting.

== Damage ==
Two hundred and seventy-two people were reported dead in this earthquake. 2,165 houses were totally destroyed. Building damage rate was high along the Tanna Fault. Many buildings collapsed in the village of Kawanishi (川西村), now part of Izunokuni, Shizuoka. The earthquake caused many landslides. A landslide caused 15 deaths in the village of Nakakano (中狩野村), and another one caused 8 deaths in the village of Kitakano (北狩野村), both locations now belong to Izu, Shizuoka. The intensity reached shindo 6 in Mishima, Shizuoka. Fires were reported in Itō, Shizuoka.

== Related earthquakes ==
The change of the Coulomb failure stress due to the 1923 Kantō earthquake may have had contribution to the occurrence of this earthquake.

There was an earthquake swarm near Itō, Shizuoka from February 13 to the end of May 1930, to which the November 26 earthquake was not thought to belong.

The largest foreshock of this earthquake occurred on November 25, 1930, at 16:05 local time, and the largest aftershock occurred on March 7, 1931, at 01:53 local time.

== Earthquake light ==
A prominent earthquake light was observed. It could be observed over a large area, including the coast of Suruga Bay, the Izu Peninsula, the coast of Sagami Bay, Sagami River Valley, the coast of Tokyo Bay, and the Bōsō Peninsula. The earthquake light was reported to have appeared before the earthquake occurred and continued for at least an hour.

== See also ==
- List of earthquakes in 1930
- List of earthquakes in Japan
