= Kayan Township =

Kayan Township ခရမ်း မြို့နယ်
- Township of Yangon Region
- Khayan Township
- Kayan Township in Thanlyin District

- Location within Myanmar
- Coordinates: 16°46′0″N 96°32′0″E
- Country: Myanmar
- Region: Yangon Region
- District: Thanlyin District

Population (2014)
  - Total: 158,019
- Time zone: UTC6:30 (MMT)
- Area codes: 1 (mobile: 80, 99)

Kayan Township or Khayan Township (Burmese: ခရမ်း မြို့နယ်, pronounced [kʰəjáɰ̃ mjo̰nɛ̀]) is a township of Thanlyin District, southeastern Yangon Region. It is the easternmost township of Yangon Region and borders Bago Region.
