= 2012 Shwebo earthquake =

6.8 magnitude earthquake in central Myanmar

- Location within Myanmar
- UTC time: 2012-11-11 01:12:40
- ISC event: 601885134
- USGS-ANSS: ComCat
- Local date: 11 November 2012
- Local time: 07:42:40 MMT
- Magnitude: 6.8 M_{w}
- Depth: 13.7 km (9 mi)
- Epicenter: 23.014°N 95.883°E
- Areas affected: Burma
- Max. intensity: MMI VII (Very strong)
- Casualties: 26 dead + 12 missing

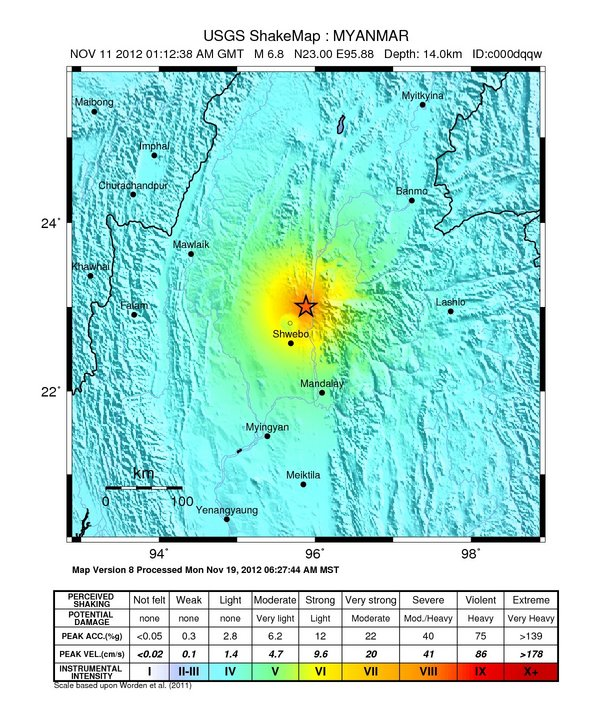
USGS shake map for the earthquake

The 2012 Shwebo earthquake occurred at 07:42 local time (01:12 UTC) on 11 November in Myanmar. It had a magnitude of 6.8 on the moment magnitude scale and a maximum perceived intensity of VII (Very strong) on the Mercalli intensity scale. The epicenter was near the town of Male, 52 km NNE of the city of Shwebo, 64 km west of Mogok and 120 km north of Mandalay. Significant damage and possible casualties have been reported from near the epicenter, with up to 26 people dead and many more injured. Part of a bridge under construction fell into the Irrawaddy River near Shwebo and a gold mine collapsed at Sintku. An aftershock with a magnitude of 5.8 followed at 17:24 local time (10:54 UTC).

== Tectonic setting ==
Central Burma lies within the complex zone of collision between the Indo-Australian plate and the Eurasian plate. In this area the collision is highly oblique and much of the plate convergence is accommodated by right lateral strike slip faults, of which the largest is the north–south trending Sagaing Fault, which takes up 18 mm per year of this movement.

== Earthquake ==
The earthquake was caused by right lateral movement on the Sagaing Fault between Singu and Tagaung, with a preliminary estimated rupture length of 60–70 km, and was followed by three large (M≥5) aftershocks in the area south of the mainshock epicenter, and one to the north.

A detailed and thorough evaluation of the event suggest the rupture was estimated at 45-km-long and on the Sagaing Fault zone. Centroid moment tensor solution suggested the earthquake ruptured a north–south trending and sub-vertical fault that steeply dipped to the east.

Surface ruptures associated with the earthquake was well defined for 45 km. The earthquake had produced a maximum slip of 1.02 meters at a location north of Thabeikkyin.

== Damage ==
Many buildings, including monasteries, pagodas, a hospital, and a school collapsed in Male and neighbouring villages. Damage was also reported from Shwebo, Mogok and Mandalay. The Radana Thinga Bridge, which was still under construction, fell into the Irrawaddy River, and several workers went missing.

== See also ==
- List of earthquakes in 2012
- List of earthquakes in Myanmar
