= Burma Gazette =

Government gazette of Myanmar

Gazette of the Republic of the Union of Myanmar
- Type: Government gazette
- Publisher: Ministry of Information, Government of Burma
- Founded: 2 January 1875
- Language: Burmese
- Headquarters: Yangon, Myanmar
- City: Yangon
- Country: Myanmar
- Website: www.moi.gov.mm/ppe/

The Gazette of the Republic of the Union of Myanmar (Burmese: ပြည်ထောင်စုသမ္မတမြန်မာနိုင်ငံတော်ပြန်တမ်း; formerly The Burma Gazette) is the official government gazette of Burma. The Gazette is published weekly on Fridays, in Burmese. The Gazette contains new legislation text, executive orders and instructions, details of the establishment and recomposition of committees, promotions and postings of gazetted officers and other relevant materials.

The 2008 Constitution of Burma stipulates that laws signed by the President, enacted by the Pyidaungsu Hluttaw, or regional and state Chief Ministers "shall be promulgated by publication in the official gazette." Such laws come into effect the day of such promulgation, unless otherwise stated.

== History ==
The Burma Gazette, in its modern form, was introduced by the British, and was used to issue circulars and vernacular acts. The British Burma Gazette was first published on 2 January 1875 and continued through 25 September 1886. Its successor, the Burma Gazette, was published from 2 October 1886 onward.

== Names ==
The Burma Gazette has, throughout its history, been known by various names:

- British Burma Gazette
- Burma Gazette
- Socialist Republic of the Union of Burma Gazette
- Republic of the Union of Myanmar Gazette

== Extant copies ==
The National Library of Myanmar, which serves as the national archives, possesses the entire run of the Burma Gazette from 1875 to 1925 on microfilms, and from 1957 to 1967 in hard copy. During the Japanese occupation of Burma, the Ba Maw regime instituted Burmese as the official language, and required official publications like the Burma Gazette to be published bilingually, in English and Burmese. The National Library of Australia houses all issues of the Burma Gazette from 1974 onward.

== See also ==
- Gazette
