= Sannio Hills =

Coordinates: 41.30°N 14.65°E

The Sannio Hills (Italian: Monti del Sannio) are a range of mountains in the Campanian Apennines in southern Italy, in the province of Benevento, Campania, and extending into the province of Campobasso, Molise. Their name derives from Samnium, an ancient Roman administrative region.

Geologically, they were formed from tectonically modified pelagic basin sediments from the Middle Cenozoic and from siliciclastic sequences from the Middle Miocene which have accompanied the local orogenesis. They are overlain by Serravallian to Pliocene siliciclastic deposits. The area is part of the Sannio-Matese seismogenetic zone; notable earthquakes occurred in 1293, 1456, 1805 and 1913.

The Sannio hills have long been considered a particularly fertile zone of Italy. Olives, introduced from Greece into Italy, are still grown there besides a variety of other crops. The area is also known for producing grapes under the Sannio name, from which wines are made.
