= 1930 Pyu earthquake =

Earthquake in Myanmar

- Location within Myanmar
- UTC time: 1930-12-03 18:51:47
- ISC event: 907777
- USGS-ANSS: ComCat
- Local date: 4 December 1930
- Local time: 01:21
- Magnitude: M_{w} 7.3
- Depth: 35 km (22 mi)
- Epicenter: 17.97°N 96.42°E
- Max. intensity: MMI IX (Violent)
- Casualties: 36 deaths

The 1930 Pyu earthquake occurred on 4 December at 01:21 local time with an epicenter north of Bago, Burma, then part of British India. The earthquake measured M_{w} 7.3, or M_{s} 7.3. There were at least 36 deaths.

== Earthquake ==
Before the earthquake, a tremor occurred at 16:36 UTC, and was felt in Yangon. The earthquake struck at 18:51 UTC, causing severe damage to Pyu, located about 130 kilometres (81 mi) north of Bago. Many masonry structures in Pyu were destroyed.

== Damage ==
The area between Nyaunglebin and Toungoo was hardest hit, with 36 deaths reported. Many buildings were destroyed and the local railway was also damaged, with many freight cars and one locomotive derailed and turned over. The intensity of the quake reached Rossi-Forel VIII–IX, corresponding to MM VII–IX, and was felt in Bangkok, Thailand, about 660 km (410 mi) away. It was reported that the water in the Khlong Saen Saeb was agitated violently and overflowed its banks more than once.

== Related earthquakes ==
This earthquake and the Bago earthquake on May 5, 1930, were both located in the area of the Sagaing Fault. The Sagaing Fault is a right-lateral strike-slip fault that accommodates much of the shear component of the highly oblique relative motion between the India Plate and the Sunda plate. This fault influences segments of the path of the Irrawaddy north of Mandalay. The May 5 earthquake may have triggered the December 4 Pyu earthquake. The distribution of the intensities of the two earthquakes suggests that at least a 50 km (31 mi) section of the Sagaing Fault between the two events of 1930 did not rupture during either of these two earthquakes.

== See also ==
- List of earthquakes in 1930
- List of earthquakes in Myanmar
