= Seismic gap =

Active fault segment with few or no earthquakes

A seismic gap is a segment of an active fault known to produce significant earthquakes that has not slipped in an unusually long time, compared with other segments along the same structure. There is a hypothesis or theory that states that over long periods, the displacement on any segment must be equal to that experienced by all the other parts of the fault. Any large and longstanding gap is, therefore, considered to be the fault segment most likely to suffer future earthquakes.

The applicability of this approach has been criticised by some seismologists, although earthquakes sometimes have occurred in previously identified seismic gaps.

== Examples ==
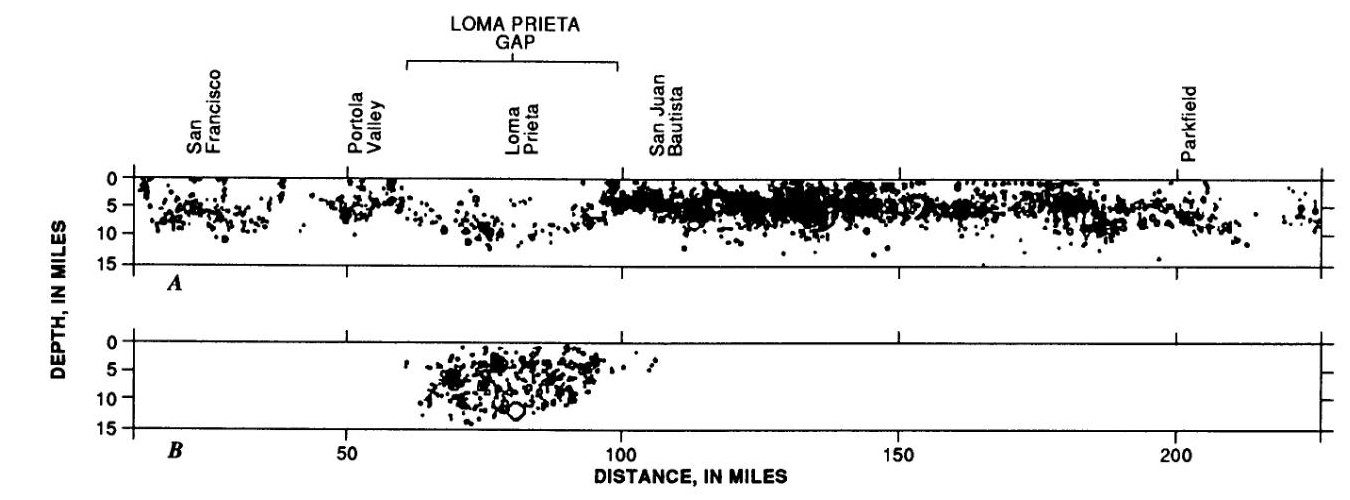
Cross sections along the San Andreas Fault showing recorded seismic activity A) 20 years before the Loma Prieta event, B) The main shock (large circle) and aftershocks for the Loma Prieta event, USGS Circular 1045

=== Loma Prieta Seismic Gap, California ===
Prior to the 1989 Loma Prieta earthquake(M_{w} = 6.9), that segment of the San Andreas Fault system recorded much less seismic activity than other parts of the fault. The main shock and aftershocks of the 1989 event occurred within the previous seismic gap.

=== Central Kuril gap, Russia ===
Immediately following the 2004 Indian Ocean earthquake, a seismic gap analysis of the seismic zones around the Pacific Ocean identified the Central Kuril segment of the Kuril–Kamchatka Trench subduction zone as the most likely to give rise to a major earthquake. This zone, 500 km in length, at that time had experienced no major earthquake since 1780, but was bounded to north and south by segments that had moved within the last 100 years. The M_{w} = 8.3 earthquake of 15 November 2006 and the M_{w} = 8.2 earthquake of 13 January 2007 occurred within the defined gap.

=== Central Himalayan Gap, India ===
Although there had been earthquakes to the west (near Delhi) in 1905, and to the east (Nepal–India earthquake) in 1934, there was a 600-kilometer-long region of the central Himalayan that had not ruptured since 1505. In April 2015, the 7.8 M_{w} April 2015 Nepal earthquake occurred near the center of this region.

=== Cascadia, United States–Canada ===
The only known damaging earthquakes to have occurred in the Cascadia subduction zone since the 1700 Cascadia earthquake are the 1946 Vancouver Island earthquake and 2001 Nisqually earthquake.

=== Meiktila gap, Myanmar ===
On the Sagaing Fault, geologists identified a 260 km (160 mi) long section of the fault between Mandalay and Naypyidaw with no historical ruptures since at least 1918. They published their findings in 2011 and concluded that at least 2 m (6 ft 7 in) of slip had accumulated along the length of the gap. If the entire gap ruptured, the expected magnitude would be around 7.9. Another study in 2014 suggested that the seismic gap last ruptured during the 23 March 1839 earthquake. On 28 March 2025, a 500 km (310 mi) section of the Sagaing Fault, including the 260 km (160 mi) gap, ruptured in a magnitude 7.7 earthquake.
