= 1956 Sagaing earthquake =

Earthquake in Myanmar

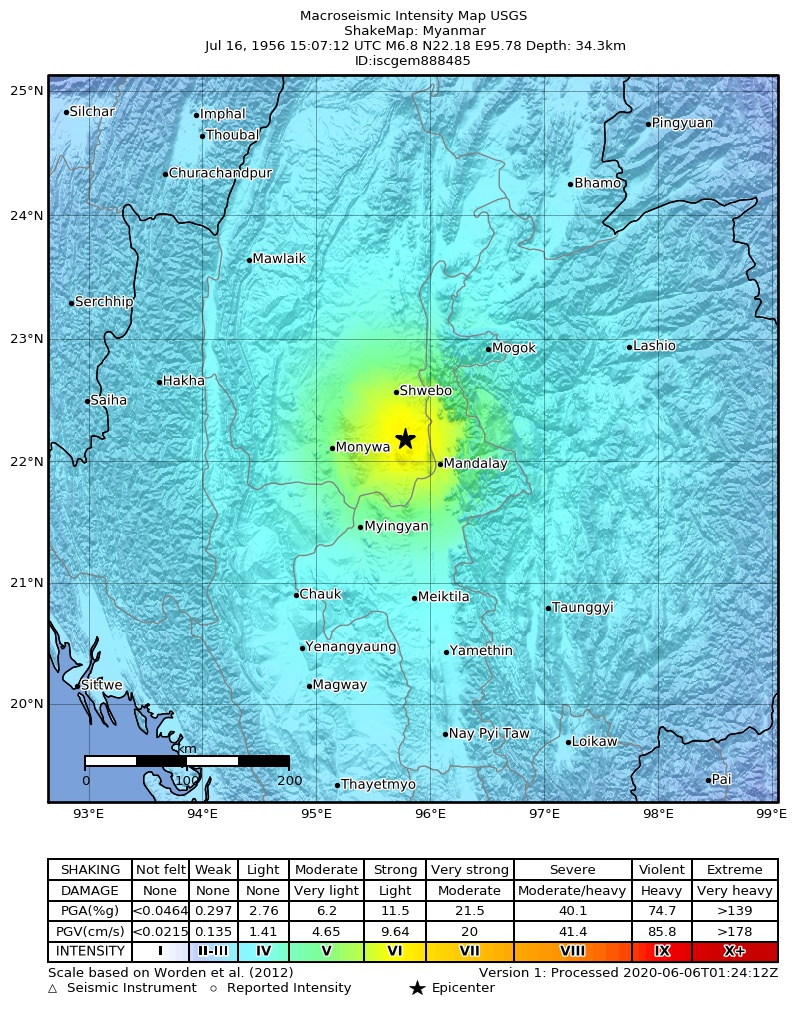
- USGS ShakeMap

- Location within Myanmar
- UTC time: 1956-07-16 15:07:12
- ISC event: 888485
- USGS-ANSS: ComCat
- Local date: July 16, 1956
- Local time: 21:37:12
- Magnitude: M_{w} 7.1
- Depth: 25 km (16 mi)
- Epicenter: 22.08°N 95.82°E
- Max. intensity: MMI IX (Violent)
- Casualties: 38 deaths

The 1956 Sagaing earthquake occurred on July 16, 1956, at 15:07 UTC. The earthquake was located near Sagaing, Burma. This earthquake had a magnitude of M_{w} 7.1.

Thirty-eight people died because of the earthquake. Several pagodas, including the Mingun Pagoda, were severely damaged. The earthquake was close to the Shan-Sagaing Fault. However, the focal mechanism remains undetermined. Near the epicenter, the shaking reached VIII (Severe) to IX (Violent) on the Modified Mercalli intensity scale.

== See also ==
- List of earthquakes in 1956
- List of earthquakes in Myanmar
