= Rossi–Forel scale =

Seismic intensity scale

The Rossi–Forel scale was one of the first seismic scales to represent earthquake intensities. Developed by Michele Stefano Conte de Rossi of Italy and François-Alphonse Forel of Switzerland during the late 19th century, it was used commonly for about two decades until the introduction of the Mercalli intensity scale in 1902.

The Rossi–Forel scale and/or its modifications is still used in some countries, such as the Philippines until 1996 when it was replaced by the PHIVOLCS earthquake intensity scale.

== Scale ==
The 1873 version of the Rossi–Forel scale had 10 intensity levels:

Scale level	Ground conditions
I. Microseismic tremor	Recorded by a single seismograph or by seismographs of the same model, but not by several seismographs of different kinds. The shock felt by an experienced observer.
II. Extremely feeble tremor	Recorded by several seismographs of different kinds. Felt by a small number of persons at rest.
III. Feeble tremor	Felt by several persons at rest. Strong enough for the direction or duration to be appreciable.
IV. Slight tremor	Felt by persons in motion. Disturbance of movable objects, doors, windows, cracking of ceilings.
V. Moderate tremor	Felt generally by everyone. Disturbance of furniture, ringing of some bells.
VI. Strong tremor	General awakening of those asleep. General ringing of bells. Oscillation of chandeliers, stopping of clocks, visible agitation of trees and shrubs. Some startled persons leaving their dwellings.
VII. Very strong tremor	Overthrow of movable objects, fall of plaster, ringing of church bells. General panic. Moderate to heavy damage buildings.
VIII. Damaging tremor	Fall of chimneys. Cracks in the walls of buildings.
IX. Devastating tremor	Partial or total destruction of buildings.
X. Extremely high intensity tremor	Great disaster, ruins, disturbance of the strata, fissures in the ground, rock falls from mountains.

== See also ==
- Richter scale
- Seismic intensity scales
- Seismic magnitude scales

== Bibliography ==
- Tiedemann, Herbert (1992). Earthquakes and Volcanic Eruptions. A Handbook on Risk Assessment. Zurich: Swiss Reinsurance Company.
