= List of earthquakes in Myanmar =

Map of earthquakes in Myanmar since 1900, with magnitudes. Click for dates and details. (map data)

Map showing a number of Myanmar's most notable earthquakes

Myanmar is one of the most seismically active countries in Southeast Asia. As it is on the Indian and Eurasian plate boundary, it is notorious for devastating earthquakes. Oblique subduction, block rotation, and a transform margin have been responsible for the seismic activities of the country. The Sagaing Fault is one of the largest sources of earthquakes in the country, having produced deadly quakes in the past centuries. Along the western coast, offshore Rahkine State, the Sunda Megathrust, where the Indian plate dives beneath the Burma plate is capable of producing large events and tsunamis like the 2004 earthquake. Intermediate-depth earthquakes east of the Chin Range also pose a risk to people. The Shan Plateau is another source of earthquakes, hosting many active strike-slip faults that accommodate block rotation of the Sunda plate. The latest earthquake happened on March 28, 2025.

== Earthquakes ==
Notable earthquakes in the history of Myanmar include the following:

Date	Location	Mag.	MMI	Depth (km)	Deaths	Injuries	Notes	Ref.
2025-07-15	Mandalay	4.7 M_{w}	V	32.0	1		An aftershock of the 2025 Myanmar earthquake.	
2025-05-17	Mandalay	5.1 M_{w}	VI	10.0	2		An aftershock of the 2025 Myanmar earthquake.	
2025-03-28	Mandalay	6.7 M_{w}	IX	10.0			The strongest aftershock of the 2025 Myanmar earthquake. Struck 11 minutes after.	
2025-03-28	Sagaing	7.7–7.9 M_{w}	X	10.0	5,352	11,366	Widespread damage. Affected parts of Thailand. see 2025 Myanmar earthquake	
2023-06-07	Ayeyarwady	4.8 mb	VII	10.0	3		Several buildings and a pagoda damaged in Ma-ubin.	
2023-05-31	Mohnyin	5.9 M_{w}	VIII	10.0			Many structures damaged in Hopin and ground effects in the Indawgyi Lake area.	
2022-07-21	Kengtung	5.9 M_{ww}	VII	5.0			Damage in Kengtung. Also felt in China, Thailand, and Laos.	
2021-11-26	Hakha	6.2 M_{ww}	VIII	42.5			Minor damage and an injury also occurred in Bangladesh.	
2018-01-11	Bago	6.0 M_{ww}	VII	9.0			Felt strongly in many places.	
2017-03-13	Yangon	5.1 mb	VI	10.0	2	36		
2016-08-24	Magway	6.8 M_{w}	VI	84.1	4	20	Several temples were damaged	
2016-04-13	Sagaing	6.9 M_{w}	VI	134.8			Deaths and damage in India and Bangladesh	
2012-11-11	Sagaing	6.8 M_{w}	VIII	9.8	26	Many	12 missing	
2011-03-24	Shan	6.9 M_{w}	X	12.8	151	212		
2011-02-04	Monywa	6.4 M_{w}	VI	85.0	1			
2009-08-11	Coco Islands	7.5 M_{w}	VII	24.0				
2007-12-25	Kachin	4.8 M_{w}	IV	35.0		19	Severe damage	
2004-12-26	Coco Islands	9.2–9.3 M_{w}	-	30.0	70–800		Rupture extended to the Coco Islands	
2003-09-21	Magway	6.6 M_{wb}	VII	15.8	10	43	Damage at Taungdwingyi	
1995-07-11	Shan	6.8 M_{w}	VIII	12.5	11			
1991-01-05	Sagaing	7.0 M_{w}	VII	19.7	2			
1988-11-06	Shan	7.2 M_{s}	X	15.9			Aftershock of the Lancang earthquake.	
1988-11-06	Shan	7.7 M_{w}	IX	17.8	700	3,900		
1988-08-06	Sagaing	7.3 M_{w}	VIII	98.1	3	30	Caused some damage in India and was felt in the Soviet Union. At least 30 injured or missing in Bangladesh.	
1976-05-29	Yunnan	7.0 M_{w}		10.0	98	2,400+		
1975-07-08	Mandalay	7.0 M_{w}	VIII	106.8	2	15		
1970-07-29	Sagaing	7.0 M_{w}		76.1			Damage at Assam.	
1956-07-16	Sagaing	7.1 M_{w}	VIII	34.3	38			
1954-03-21	Sagaing	7.4 mb		180.0			Some damage reported in India.	
1952-06-19	Shan	6.7 M_{w}	VIII	10.0			Homes collapsed and landslides occurred in Yunnan.	
1950-08-15	Assam	8.6 M_{w}	XI	15.0	4,800		Rupture partially extended to Burma and was felt strongly	
1946-09-12	Sagaing	7.8 M_{w}		15.0	0		Doublet earthquake	
1946-09-12	Sagaing	8.0 M_{w}		15.0	0			
1943-10-23	Chin	7.2						
1941-12-26	Shan	7.2 M_{w}		10.0	>6			
1938-08-16	Chin	7.2 M_{s}		75.0				
1932-08-14	Sagaing	7.0 M_{s}		110.0			Damage at Assam	
1931-01-27	Kachin	7.6 M_{w}	IX	15.0	0			
1930-12-03	Bago	7.3 M_{w}	X	10.0	36			
1930-07-18	Irrawaddy				50			
1930-05-05	Bago	7.5 M_{w}	X	35.0	500	204+	Tsunami	
1929-08-08	Naypyidaw	6.6–7.1 M_{w}		10.0–15.0			Caused some damage.	
1929-01-19	Kachin	5.5 M_{s}	IX				Damage at Htawgaw.	
1927-12-17	Yangon	~7.0 M_{w}					Severe damage in northern Yangon	
1923-06-22	Shan	7.2 M_{w}		25.0				
1922-05-02	Shan	6.7 M_{w}		35.0				
1917-07-05	Bago						Shwemawdaw Pagoda fell.	
1912-05-23	Shan	7.8M_{w}	IX	15–25.0	1(?)		Several cities damaged	
1908-12-12	Kachin	7.2 M_{w}		15.0				
1908-12-12	Kachin	7.2 M_{w}		15.0				
1906-08-31	Northern Sagaing Fault	7.0 M_{w}						
1906-06-24	Coco Islands	7.3 M_{uk}		60.0 km	0			
1895/1896	Yangon						Destroyed many buildings in Rangoon.	
1858-08-24	Magway	7.7 M_{w}			?		An island disappeared.	
1843-10-30	Rahkine						May have triggered a tsunami.	
1842-11-11	Rahkine						Tsunami recorded at Cheduba Island.	
1848-01-03	Rahkine	6.8–7.2 M_{w}			?		Severe shaking at Ramree Island.	
1839-03-23	Mandalay	8.1–8.2 M_{w}	XI	12-15.0	500+		Former capital city Inwa destroyed and abandoned.	
1762-04-02	Chittagong-Rahkine	8.8 M_{w}	XI		200+		Tsunami	
1757-06-04	Bago							
1750	Rahkine							
1714-08-04	Sagaing						Waves from a river flooded a nearby city.	
1620-06-06	Mandalay						Fishes in the Irrawaddy River were killed.	
1564-09-13	Bago						Mahazedi Pagoda destroyed.	
1485-07-24	Sagaing						Several pagodas fell.	
1467	Innwa							
1429	Innwa							
Note: Only damaging, injurious, or deadly events should be recorded.

=== Tsunamis affecting Myanmar ===
- 1881 Nicobar Islands earthquake – magnitude 7.9 earthquake, no fatalities
- 1941 Andaman Islands earthquake – magnitude 7.7 earthquake, moderate damage and unknown fatalities.
- 2004 Indian Ocean earthquake – magnitude 9.2 earthquake, severe damage, between 400 and 600 people killed.
- 2009 Andaman Islands earthquake – magnitude 7.5 earthquake, tsunami warning issued, no injuries or fatalities anywhere.
- 2012 Indian Ocean earthquake – magnitude 8.6 earthquake, tsunami warning issued, no fatalities.

== Gallery ==
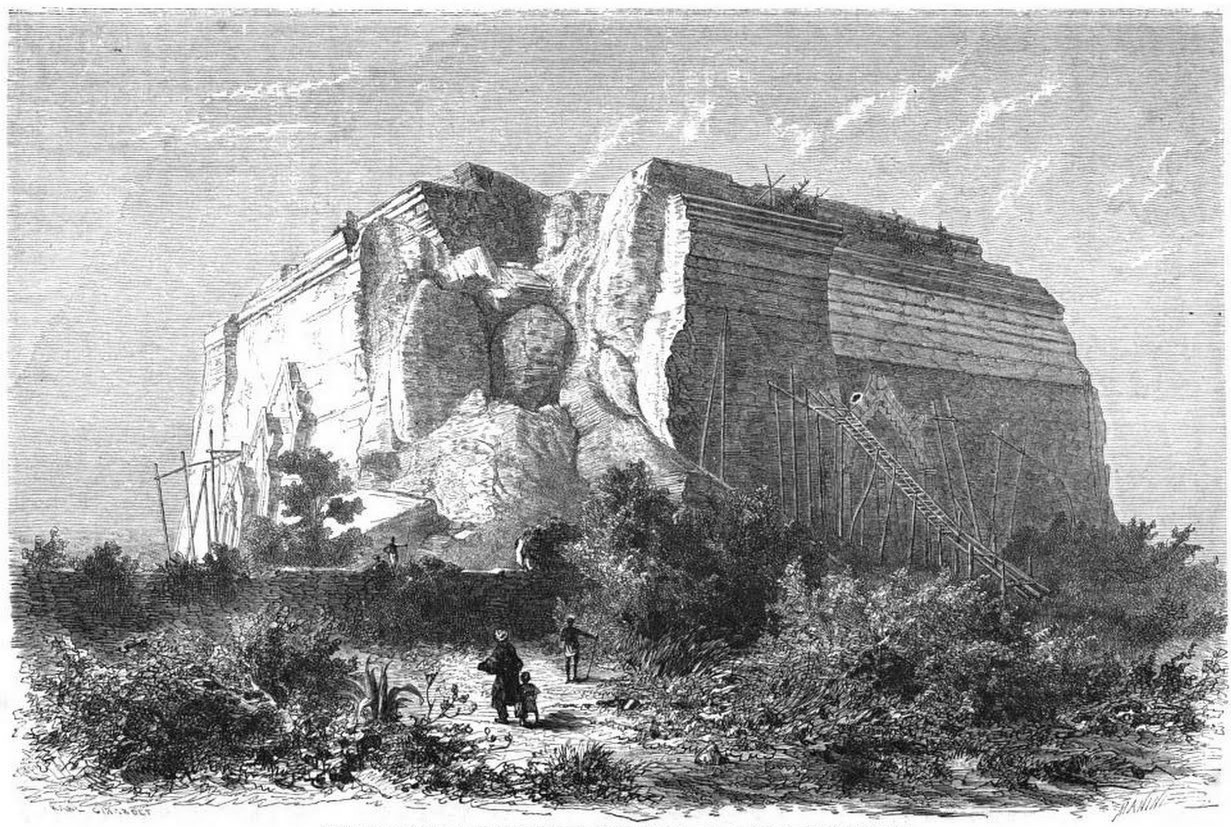
1839 Ava earthquake

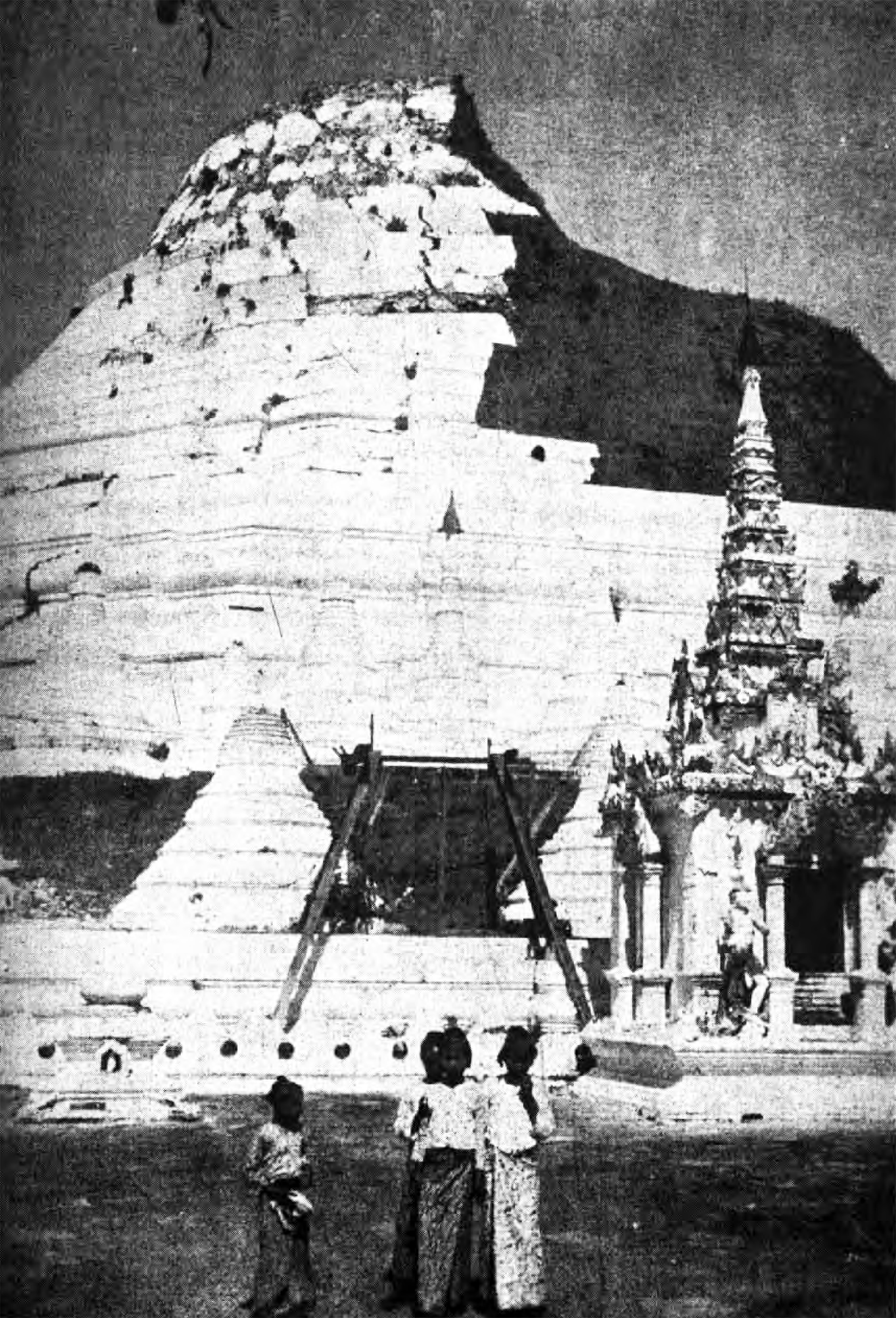
1930 Bago earthquake

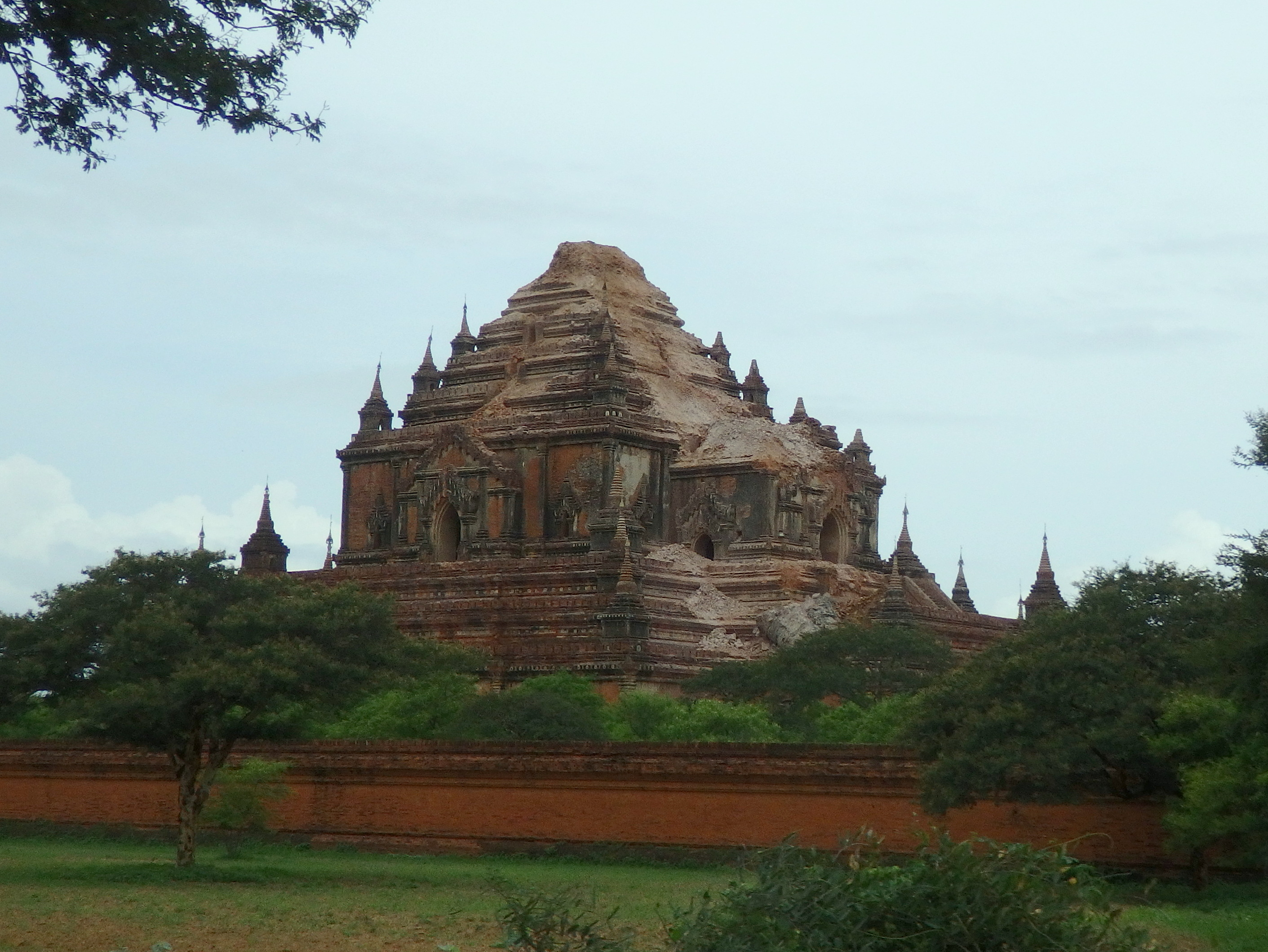
2016 Chauk earthquake

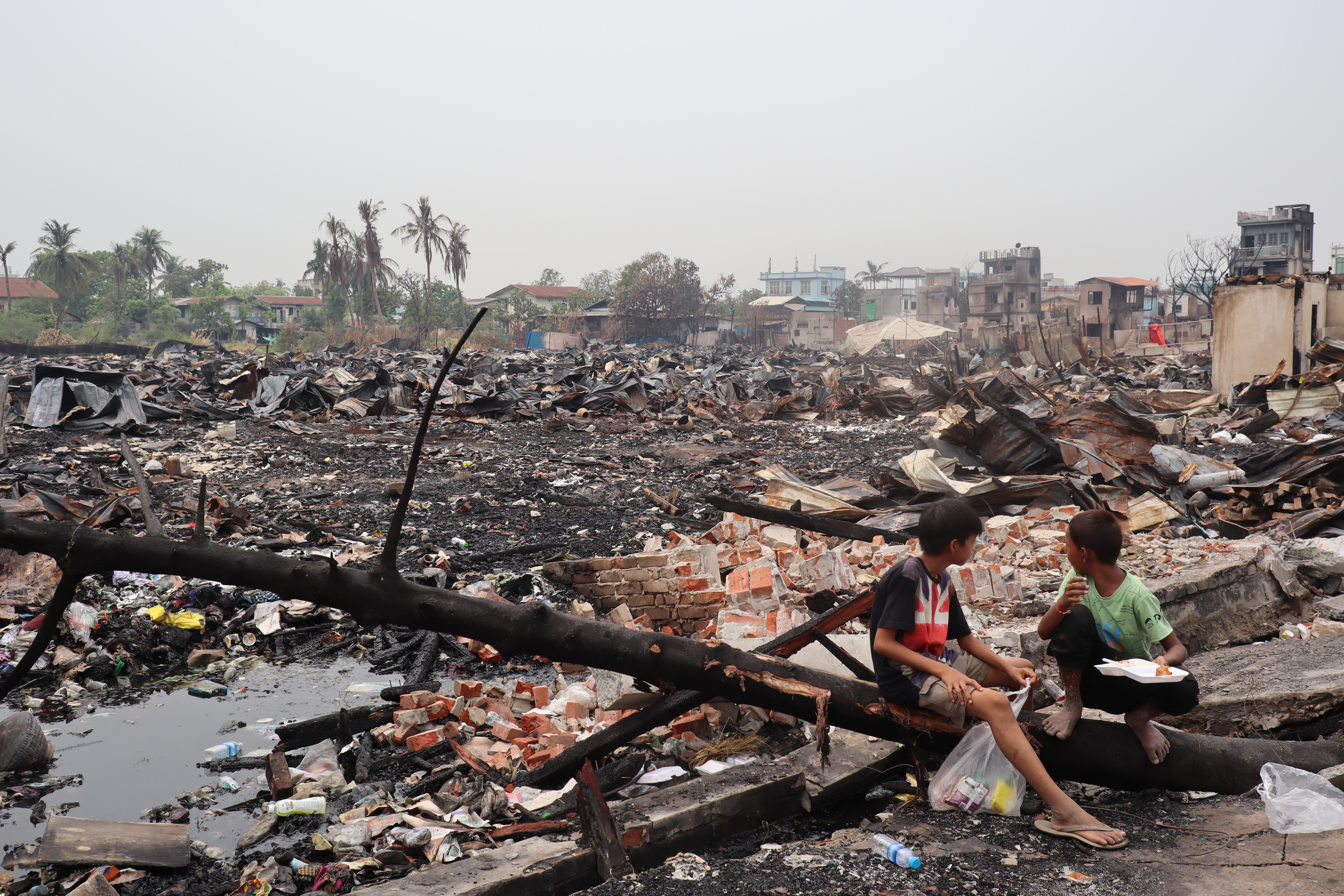
2025 Myanmar earthquake

== See also ==
- Geology of Myanmar
