= 1975 Bagan earthquake =

Earthquake in Myanmar

- Location within Myanmar
- UTC time: 1975-07-08 12:04:38
- ISC event: 725977
- USGS-ANSS: ComCat
- Local date: 8 July 1975
- Local time: 18:34:38
- Magnitude: 7.0 M_{w}
- Depth: 157 km (98 mi)
- Epicenter: 21.48°N 94.7°E
- Total damage: Ninety-four major temples extensively damaged
- Max. intensity: MMI VIII (Severe)
- Casualties: 2 dead 15 injured

The 1975 Bagan earthquake occurred on July 8 at 6:34 pm local time (12:04 UTC) in Bagan, Myanmar. Many important stupas and temples were destroyed. The strongest intensity was felt in the towns of Nyaung-U, Pakokku, and Yesagyo, and in the Myaing townships on the confluence of the Ayeyawady River. Damage was also reported in Chauk and Natmauk townships. It had a magnitude of M_{w} 7.0.

Art historians rank the archeological treasures of Bagan (formerly called Pagan) with the renowned temple complex at Angkor Wat or with the European artworks of Venice and Florence. The earthquake "irreparably damaged many of the great temples of Bagan, an artistic landmark of Asia and the center of the Burmese national culture." Burma's Director General of Archeology said the earthquake the worst in the last 900 years of recorded history.

The source of the earthquake is still controversial because of uncertainties in the depth information ranging from 84 to 157 km. Subduction and collision of the India Plate and the Burma plate is ongoing and this earthquake was on the interface of these two plates.

== Tectonic setting ==
Myanmar lies at region where the Indian, Burma and Eurasian plates collide; with the Burma plate wedged between. The north-northeast motion of the Indian plate towards the Eurasian plate has resulted in the formation of two major plate boundaries along the Burma plate; the Sagaing Fault to the east, and a complex convergent boundary accommodating oblique subduction of the Indian plate beneath Myanmar. Subduction of the Indian plate occur along the Arakan Megathrust; the northern continuation of the Sunda Megathrust; capable of generating an earthquake greater than magnitude 8.0. The M_{w} 8.5–8.8 Arakan earthquake of 1762 is believed to be a thrusting earthquake on the Arakan Megathrust.

Intermediate-depth intraslab earthquakes occur as a result of faulting within the subducting Indian plate beneath the Burma plate. These earthquakes have hypocenter depths that range from 60 kilometres (37 mi) to greater than 200 kilometres (120 mi). Earthquakes including the M_{w} 7.3 1988 Myanmar–India earthquake, as well as the April and August earthquakes of 2016 were associated with intermediate-depth intraslab activity. The 1988 earthquake is the largest known intermediate-depth event in Myanmar.

== Earthquake ==
The earthquake occurred as a result of either reverse or normal faulting at an intermediate depth within the subducting Indian plate beneath the Burma plate. Faulting within the Indian plate at such depth are due to intraplate compression or extension acting on the slab, where faults accommodate the stresses. Earthquakes occurring within the Indian plate could be traced up to 200 km beneath the crust.

== See also ==
- List of earthquakes in 1975
- List of earthquakes in Myanmar
