= 1988 Myanmar–India earthquake =

Earthquake in South Asia

- Location within South Asia
- UTC time: 1988-08-06 00:36:24
- ISC event: 428070
- USGS-ANSS: ComCat
- Local date: 6 August 1988
- Local time: 7:06 am
- Duration: 2 minutes
- Magnitude: 7.3 M_{w} 7.5 M_{L}
- Depth: 90.5 km (56.2 mi)
- Epicenter: 25.149°N 95.127°E
- Type: Oblique-reverse
- Areas affected: Myanmar, India and Bangladesh
- Max. intensity: MMI VIII (Severe)
- Landslides: Yes
- Casualties: 3 dead and 12 injured in India; 2 dead, 30 injured and 30 missing in Bangladesh

The 1988 Myanmar–India earthquake, also known as the Indo–Burma earthquake struck the Sagaing Region of Myanmar, about 30 kilometres (19 mi) from the border with India on 6 August at 7:06 am MMT with a moment magnitude (M_{w}) of 7.3 or Richter magnitude (M_{L}) of 7.5. At least five people were killed, more than 30 were injured, and another 30 were missing as a result. Serious damage was reported in India and Bangladesh, while some minor damage occurred in Myanmar. The earthquake was reportedly felt in the Soviet Union.

== Tectonic setting ==
Myanmar lies at region where the Indian, Burma and Eurasian plates collide; with the Burma plate wedged between. The north-northeast motion of the Indian plate towards the Eurasian plate has resulted in the formation of two major plate boundaries along the Burma plate; the Sagaing Fault to the east, and a complex convergent boundary accommodating oblique subduction of the Indian plate beneath Myanmar. Subduction of the Indian plate occur along the Arakan Megathrust; the northern continuation of the Sunda Megathrust; capable of generating an earthquake greater than magnitude 8.0. The M_{w} 8.5–8.8 Arakan earthquake of 1762 is believed to be a thrusting earthquake on the Arakan Megathrust.

Intermediate-depth intraslab earthquakes occur as a result of faulting within the subducting Indian plate beneath the Burma plate. These earthquakes have hypocenter depths that range from 60 kilometres (37 mi) to greater than 200 kilometres (120 mi). Earthquakes including the M_{w} 7.0 1975 Bagan earthquake, as well as the April and August earthquakes of 2016 were associated with intermediate-depth intraslab activity.

== Earthquake ==
The earthquake had an epicenter location in a remote and sparsely populated area, more than 200 miles (320 km) from Mandalay, Myanmar and Shillong, India. Many small settlements however, including Homalin, Maungkan, Hta Man Thi and Kawya were in close proximity to the location of the quake. West of where the earthquake nucleated, lies the Chin Hills-Arakan Range, a mountain belt formed by the collision of the Indian and Burma plate, similar to the continental collision seen in the Himalayas. The focal mechanism of this event indicated oblique-reverse faulting at an intermediate depth of 90 km within the Indian plate.

== Impact ==
Two people were killed, 30 were injured and another 30 were missing in Bangladesh after seiches formed in the Jamuna River at Dhaka, causing a ferry boat to capsize. An additional two lost their lives in Northern India. Large-scale landslides, fissures and liquefaction events were reported in India and Bangladesh. Subsidence of 20 centimetres (7.9 in) was recorded in Gauhati, India. It was felt throughout Bangladesh and northeastern India, including Calcutta. The earthquake was also felt in parts of northwestern Myanmar and Kathmandu, Nepal. Shaking from the earthquake caused significant damage to human infrastructures, railroads, and roadways.

Shaking from the earthquake was felt throughout northeast India with a Modified Mercalli intensity of VII (Very strong). In Assam, India, severe liquefaction severely damaged roads and bridges in the National Highway 37 system. Hotel Regale in Silchar suffered extensive damage due to liquefaction; subsiding floors and cracked walls. Many aged or traditional structures not made to withstand an earthquake were damaged beyond repair. A section of an embankment slumped away, leaving a railroad between Borlongphar and Langchiliet hanging 8 meters above the ground.

On August 21 that same year, a smaller but deadlier magnitude 6.9 earthquake would affect the India and Nepal region, killing at least 721 people.

== See also ==
- List of earthquakes in Myanmar
- List of earthquakes in India
- List of earthquakes in 1988
- 1988 Lancang–Gengma earthquakes – Second major earthquake to strike Burma in the same year
