= 1858 Prome earthquake =

Earthquake in Myanmar

- Location within Myanmar
- Local date: August 24, 1858
- Local time: 15:38 BST
- Magnitude: M_{w} 7.6–8.3
- Epicenter: 19.1°N 95.1°E
- Type: Thrust
- Areas affected: Burma
- Max. intensity: MMI XI (Extreme); MSK-64 VIII (Damaging)
- Aftershocks: Yes

The 1858 Prome earthquake occurred on August 24 at 15:38 local time in British Burma (present-day Myanmar). The earthquake occurred with a magnitude of 7.6–8.3 on the moment magnitude scale. It had an epicenter in near the city of Pyay (Prome), Bago. The shock was felt with a maximum Modified Mercalli intensity of XI (Extreme) for about one minute. Severe damage was reported in Bago, and off the coast of Rakhine, an island sunk.

== Tectonic setting ==
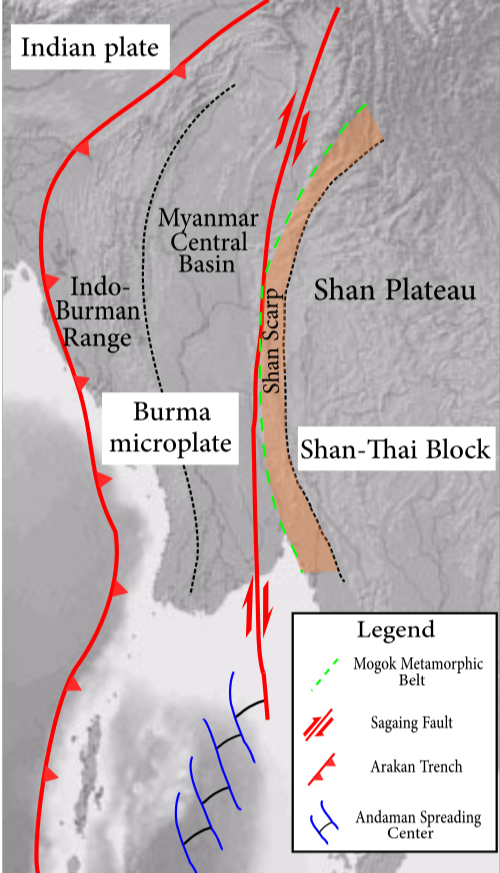
Tectonic map of Myanmar with the oblique convergent boundary marked as the Arakan Trench. The Indo-Burman Range and Central Burma basin are shown.

Burma is wedged between four tectonic plates; the Indian, Eurasian, Sunda and Burma plates that interact due to active geological processes. Along the west coast of the Coco Islands, off the Rakhine coast, and into Bangladesh, is a highly oblique convergent boundary known as the Sunda megathrust. This large fault marks the boundary between the Indian and Burma plates. The megathrust emerges from the seafloor in Bangladesh, where it runs parallel and east of the Indo-Burman Range. This boundary continues to north of Burma where it ends at the eastern Himalayas. The oblique convergent boundary is seismically active, responsible for large earthquakes and tsunamis in 1762, 1842, 1843, 1848, and 1858. Some of these earthquakes, such as the 1762 event, has resulted in great coastal uplift. In the case of the 1762 earthquake, rupture occurred on the megathrust interface and on splay faults. Another earthquake in 1848 ruptured a splay fault. Oblique convergence is also accommodated by large right-lateral and thrust faults inland, in the Central Burma basin, including the Sagaing Fault.

== Earthquake ==
The earthquake is associated with shallow crustal faulting within the Central Burma basin, located between the Indo-Burman and Pegu Ranges. Mechanism of faulting in the basin is predominantly of the thrust kind near the eastern boundary of the Indo-Burman Ranges. Large thrust faults in the basin have shown evidence of recent tectonic activity. The range is a large accretionary wedge that formed due to west coast subduction.

The 30-km-long Pato Fault at the eastern edge of the range may have caused the quake. The rupture may represent a complete failure of this reverse fault. Another possible source is the Pyay Fault, a north northwest–south southeast striking, northeast dipping thrust fault. This is a mostly blind thrust fault, where most of its features are buried beneath the basin. The fault breaches the surface near the towns of Pyay and Kama. It is part of a fold and thrust belt which also includes the Kabaw Fault to the west. It accumulates a total length of 105 km and is divided into three segments. Parts of the fault crosses the Irrawaddy River and there are evidence that the vertical movement has uplifted the river, from studying uplifted river sediments. From reports of damage at Pyay and Thayet, as well as documentation of the Irrawaddy River reversing its flow, it was inferred that the earthquake was produced on the Pyay Fault.

By calculating the magnitude of the earthquake using the documented seismic intensity (M_{i}), a magnitude of 7.7 was obtained. In 2004, Ambraseys and Douglas estimated the moment magnitude (M_{w}) to be 7.6. The upper estimate of the moment magnitude is 8.3 M_{w}by Szeliga and others.

== Effects ==
The earthquake was felt with a maximum MSK-64 intensity of VIII (Destructive) in Pyay, Aunglan and Thayet. On the Modified Mercalli intensity scale, the quake was felt X–XI. Severe shaking was felt on Kyaukphyu, Ramree Island. Pagodas were significantly damaged in Hinthada. In the worst hit areas, ground motion was characterized as moving in an east–northeast to west–southwest direction. A resident in Pyay observed movement propagating from east to west. Walls collapsed and roofs detached from homes. To the north of Pyay, collapsed homes and pagodas was reported. According to eyewitnesses, an island off the Rakhine coast, False Island (at 18.38°N 93.55°E), completely disappeared after the earthquake. The island was never seen after the day of the earthquake. Two aftershocks occurred on August 26 at 08:30, and on August 27 at 09:00 in Pyay and Thayet, respectively.

Moments before the earthquake, in Thayet, a rush of hot air and the sound similar to a flock of birds was reported by residents. It was immediately followed by vibrations of the ground. Three sharp waves were felt for a total duration of 45 seconds. A steamship on the Irrawaddy River rocked violently. The course of the Irrawaddy River reversed as a result of the quake.

The earthquake was felt in Rangoon and Mawlamyine, but little damage was reported. It was also felt in Chittagong, Bangladesh, and Calcutta, India. Shaking was felt in much of Burma.

== See also ==
- List of historical earthquakes
- List of earthquakes in Myanmar
