= Cheduba Island =

Cheduba (Manaung) မာန်အောင်ကျွန်း
- Island
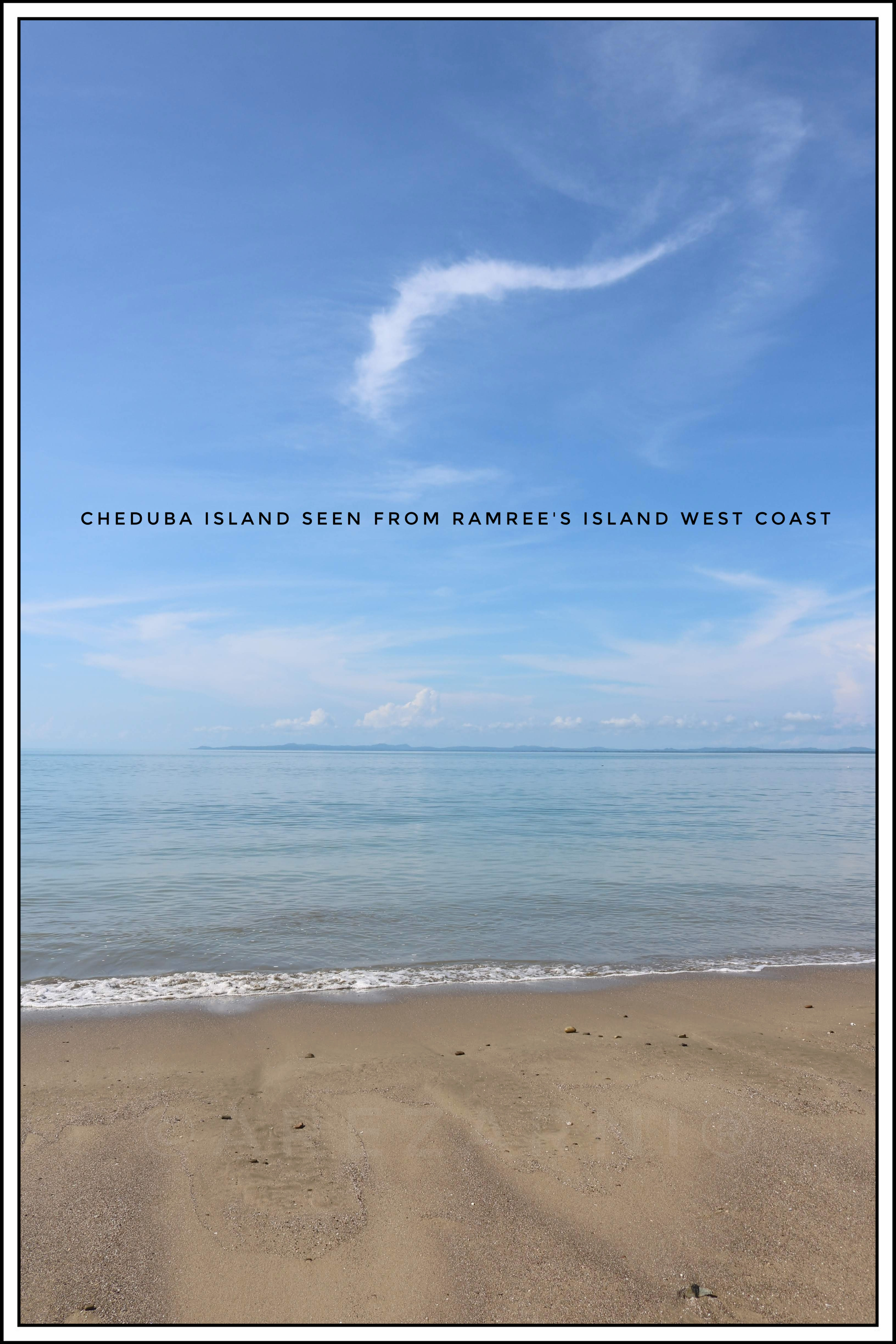

- Location within Myanmar
- Coordinates: 18°48′N 93°38′E
- Country: Myanmar
- State: Rakhine State
- District: Taungup District
- Township: Manaung Township

Area
  - Total: 523 km^{2} (202 sq mi)
- Elevation: 205 m (673 ft)

Population (1983)
  - Total: 63,761
- Time zone: UTC+6:30 (MMT)

Cheduba Island (Burmese: မာန်အောင်ကျွန်း; also known as Manaung Island) is an island of Myanmar in the Bay of Bengal close to Ramree Island. It has a maximum length of 33 km (21 mi), with an area of approximately 523 km^{2} (202 sq mi). It belongs to Taungup District of Rakhine state.

== Population ==
Cheduba had a population of 63,761 as of 1983, composed chiefly of Burmese and Arakanese peoples. The main economic activities on the island consist of farming and cattle raising.

== Geography ==
Cheduba Island lies about 10 km (6 mi) from the southwestern coast of Ramree Island. It is located between 18° 40′ and 18° 56′ N. lat., and between 93° 31′ and 93° 50′ E. long. The terrain of the island is quite flat with scattered moderate elevations. The highest point 205 metres (673 ft) is on a ridge in the southwestern part of the island.

There are 5 villages connected by a road that circles the island: Owa, Thitpon, Manaung, Budaunggwe, Sachet and Meinmangwe. There is an airfield west of Manaung, the main village of Cheduba, located on the northeast coast. Manaung is linked to the village of Kyaukpyu on nearby Ramree Island by steamer.

Most of the vegetation is tropical rainforest. There are mud cones that emit steam and sulfurous fumes on the island, which indicate some volcanic activity. There are also seepages of oil and gas.

=== Nearby islands ===
- Taik Kyun is a 1.4 km (0.9 mi) wide roughly round islet located 6 km (4 mi) off the eastern coast, about 5.8 km (3.6 mi) north of Ye Kyun.
- Ye Kyun is a 6.8 km (4.2 mi) long and 2.4 km (1.5 mi) wide island located off the southeastern end of Cheduba Island, separated from it by a 7.8 km (4.8 mi) wide strait with numerous detached reefs. Highest point 32 metres (105 ft).
- Taung Kyun is a 0.4 km (0.2 mi) long low islet located 1.8 km (1.1 mi) off the southern end of Ye Kyun. Highest point 4.9 metres (16 ft).

=== Other islands in the vicinity ===
- Unguan is a 1 km (0.6 mi) long and 0.4 km (0.2 mi) wide islet located 33 km (21 mi) to the southeast of Cheduba's southern end.
- Nantha Kyun is a roughly 2 km (1.2 mi) wide round island located 36 km (22 mi) off the mainland coast, about 45 km (28 mi) SSE of Unguan. Highest point 112 metres (367 ft).

== History ==
Cheduba Island was a stop on the coastal trade route from Bengal by which Indian civilization migrated to Myanmar.

Historical records show that an earthquake of a magnitude of 8.5 to 9.0 hit off the western coast of Myanmar in April 1762, and reports speculated that a tsunami could kill more than one million people in Myanmar and Bangladesh. In 1881, a 7.9 magnitude earthquake in the Bay of Bengal caused "broad massive flames of fire" to be emitted on the island. In the 1780s, after the Burmese conquest of the area, Cheduba became a province of Arakan. Cheduba was captured in 1824 by the British, whose possession of it was confirmed in 1826 by the Treaty of Yandabo concluded with the Burmese. An earthquake in 1858 caused an island nearby to disappear. The island, along with many other islands in the area, was evacuated and occupied by the Japanese during World War II.

== See also ==
- List of islands of Burma
