= 2016 Myanmar earthquake =

2016 Myanmar earthquake

- 2016 Kani earthquake – magnitude 6.9
- 2016 Chauk earthquake – magnitude 6.8

== See also ==
- List of earthquakes in 2016
