= Hopin, Kachin State =

Hopin ဟိုပင်
- Town
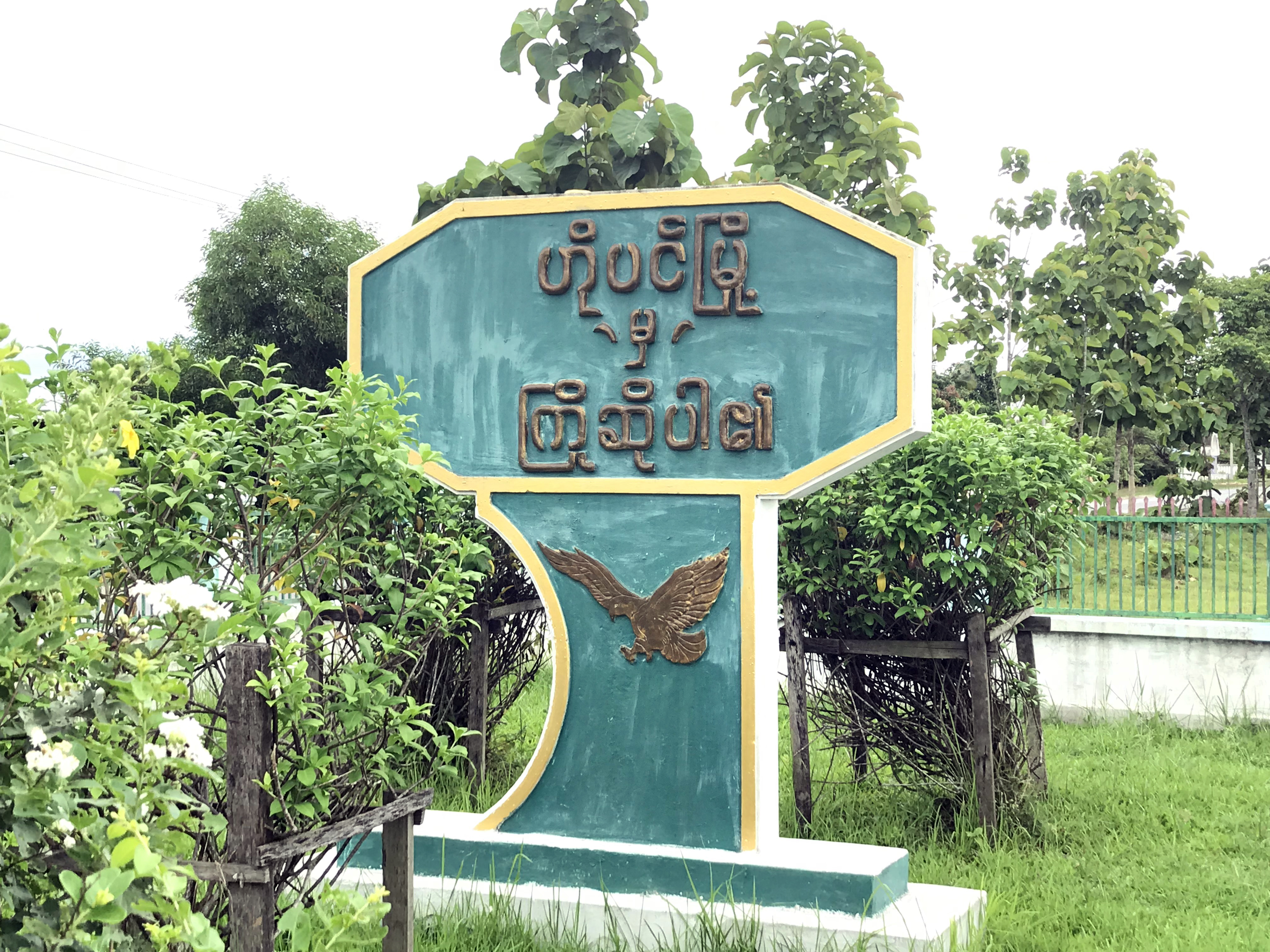

- Location in Burma
- Coordinates: 24°59′31″N 96°31′48″E
- Country: Myanmar
- Division: Kachin State
- District: Mohnyin District
- Township: Mohnyin Township

Population
  - Religions: Buddhism Christianity
- Time zone: UTC+6.30 (MST)
- WOEID: 1017418

Hopin (Burmese: ဟိုပင်မြို့; Shan: ဝဵင်းႁူဝ်ပၢင်ႇ; also Hobin) is a town in Mohnyin Township, Kachin State, in north-east Myanmar. It is situated on the main Mandalay – Myitkyina railway line, 745 miles north from Yangon. It is on the road between Mohnyin and Mogaung where the road to Ywathit and Indawgyi Lake takes off. It is 27 miles by road from Indawgyi Lake and 60 miles by road from Sinbo which is located on the west bank of the Ayeyarwady River.
