= Namti =

Namti, Kachin State, Burma
- Location in Burma
- Coordinates: 24°34′N 97°7′E
- Country: Burma
- State: Kachin State
- District: Mohnyin District
- Township: Mogaung Township

Population
  - Religions: Buddhism Christian
- Time zone: UTC+6.30 (UTC + 6:30)

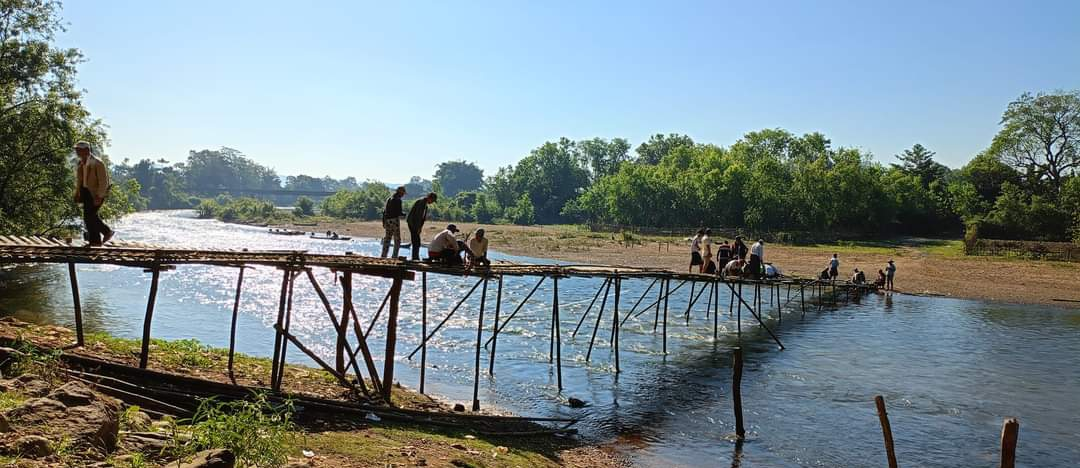
Namti Bamboo Bridge

Namti "နမ္မတီး" (also spelled "Nammati" and "Nanmati") is a town in Mogaung Township in Mohnyin District in the Kachin State of north-eastern Burma. Namti is 6 miles from Mogaung and 25 miles from Myitkyina.

The main ethnic groups living in the town are Kachin, Shan, Khamti, Burmese and Gurkhas(Gorkha). There are also a few Chinese and Indian residents.
