= Taungthonton Volcano =

Volcano in Myanmar

Taungthonton
- Location within Myanmar

Highest point
- Elevation: 1,680 m (5,510 ft)
- Coordinates: 24°58′N 95°48′E

Geography
- Country: Myanmar
- State: Kachin
- Region: Sagaing Region

Geology
- Mountain type: Stratovolcano
- Volcanic zone: Myanmar Central Basin
- Last eruption: Unknown

Taungthonton is a large inactive stratovolcano in the Sagaing Region and Kachin, northern Myanmar. There have been no recorded eruptions associated with this volcano although it is evidence of convergence between the Indian Plate and the Burma Plate.
