= Ywathit, Kachin State =

Ywathitgyi ရွာသစ်ကြီးမြို့
- Location in Burma (Myanmar)
- Coordinates: 25°0′0″N 96°28′0″E
- Country: Myanmar
- Division: Kachin State
- District: Mohnyin District
- Township: Mohnyin Township

Population
  - Religions: Buddhism Christianity
- Time zone: UTC+6.30 (MST)

Ywathitgyi (Burmese: ရွာသစ်ကြီးမြို့) is a town in Mohnyin Township in Kachin State of Myanmar. It is on the road between Hopin and Indawgyi Lake.
