= Ywathit =

Ywathit may refer to:

- Ywathit, Kachin State, Mohnyin Township, Kachin State, Burma
- Ywathit, Homalin, Homalin Township, Sagaing Region, Burma
- Ywathit, Kyain Seikgyi, Kyain Seikgyi Township, Kawkareik District
- Ywathit (18°5"N 95°46"E), Okpho Township, Bago Region, Burma
- Ywathit (18°4"N 95°38"E), Okpho Township, Bago Region, Burma
