= Indawgyi Lake Wildlife Sanctuary =

Biosphere reserve in Myanmar

- IUCN category IV (habitat/species management area)
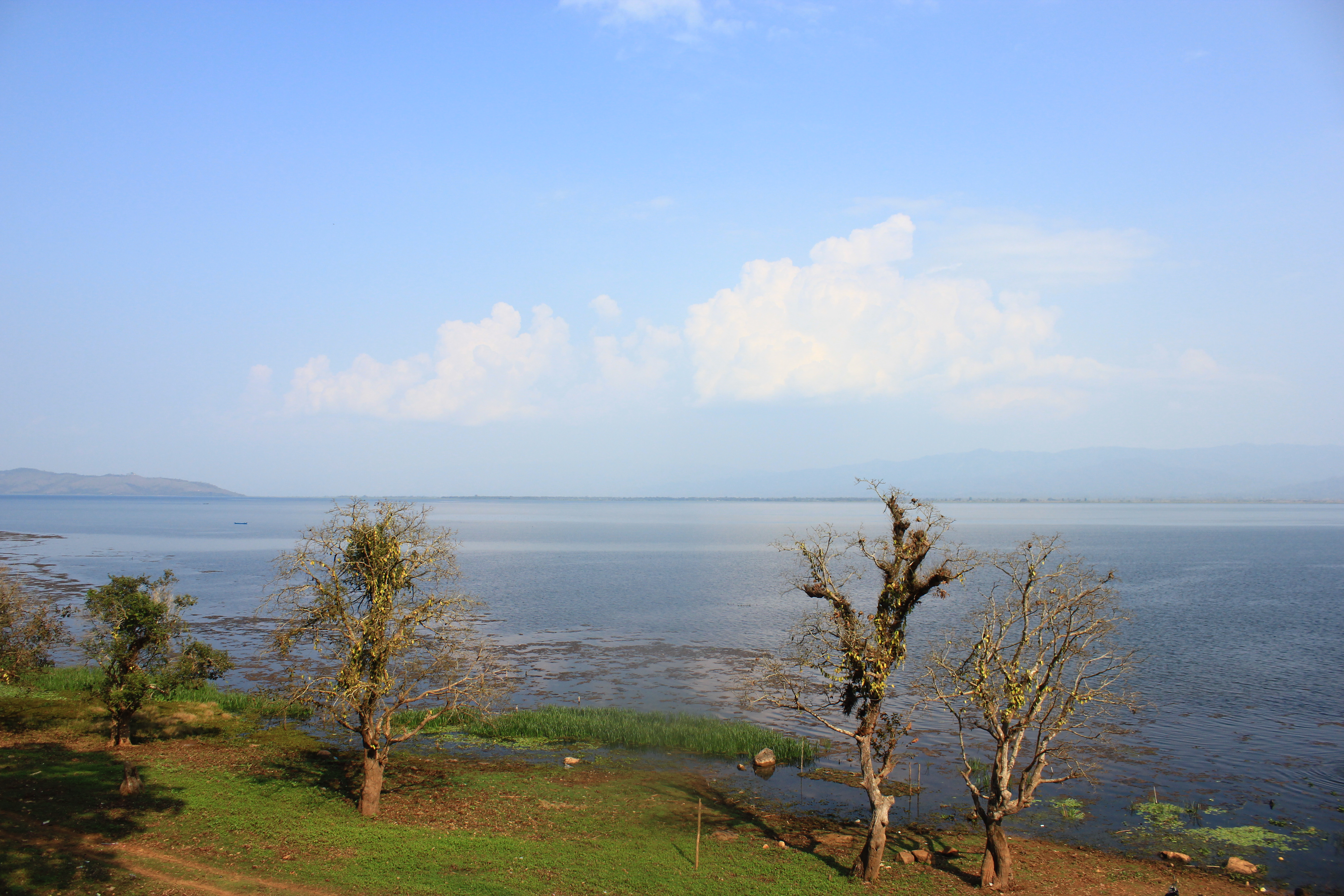

- Location within Myanmar
- Location: Mohnyin Township, Kachin State, Myanmar
- Coordinates: 25°07′N 96°22′E
- Area: 814.99 km^{2} (314.67 sq mi)
- Established: 2004

Ramsar Wetland
- Official name: Indawgyi Wildlife Sanctuary
- Designated: 2 February 2016
- Reference no.: 2256

Indawgyi Lake Wildlife Sanctuary is a biosphere reserve in Myanmar, covering 814.99 km^{2} (314.67 sq mi). It ranges in elevation from 105–1,400 m (344–4,593 ft) encompassing the surroundings of Indawgyi Lake in Mohnyin Township, Kachin State. It was gazetted in 2004, is recognized as an Important Bird Area and as one of the ASEAN Heritage Parks. An area of 478.84 km^{2} (184.88 sq mi) comprising the lake and the surrounding lowland is a Ramsar site since February 2016.

During a survey in the winter of 2004, both resident and migratory birds were sighted on the lake and along Indawgyi River, including white-rumped vulture (Gyps bengalensis), slender-billed vulture (G. tenuirostris), Himalayan vulture (G. himalayensis), lesser whistling duck (Dendrocygna javanica), tufted duck (Aythya fuligula), ferruginous pochard (A. nyroca), gadwall (Mareca strepera), ruddy shelduck (Tadorna ferruginea), Eurasian teal (Anas crecca), northern pintail (A. acuta), greylag goose (Anser anser), Eurasian coot (Fulica atra), little grebe (Tachybaptus ruficollis), great crested grebe (Podiceps cristatus), little cormorant (Microcarbo niger), purple heron (Ardea purpurea), brown-headed gull (Chroicocephalus brunnicephalus), black-headed gull (C. ridibundus), wood sandpiper (Tringa glareola), Temminck's stint (Calidris temminckii), black-winged stilt (Himantopus himantopus), grey-headed lapwing (Vanellus cinereus) and glossy ibis (Plegadis falcinellus).

In 2012, an Indian hog deer (Hyelaphus porcinus) population was discovered in a grassland northeast of the lake. Since 2013, Baer's pochard (Aythya baeri), rufous-necked hornbill (Aceros nipalensis), sarus crane (Antigone antigone), woolly-necked stork (Ciconia episcopus), lesser adjutant (Leptoptilos javanicus), spot-billed pelican (Pelecanus philippensis), greater spotted eagle (Clanga clanga), cinereous vulture (Aegypius monachus), Pallas's fish eagle (Haliaeetus leucoryphus), wood snipe (Gallinago nemoricola), black-bellied tern (Sterna acuticauda) and red-breasted parakeet (Psittacula alexandri) were sighted in the sanctuary. It also provides habitat for Burmese peacock softshell turtle (Nilssonia formosa), elongated tortoise (Indotestudo elongata), Asian forest tortoise (Manouria emys), Amboina box turtle (Cuora amboinensis), Asiatic softshell turtle (Amyda cartilaginea) and 93 fish species. During a herpetological survey, the Indawgyi bent-toed gecko (Cyrtodactylus mombergi) was discovered and described in 2019.
