= Mohnyin University =

Public university in Myanmar

- မိုးညှင်းတက္ကသိုလ် IPA: [móɲɪ́ɰ̃ tɛʔkəθò]
- Seal of Mohnyin University
- Former name: Mohnyin Degree College (2003–2020)
- Motto: ပညာရည်တိုးနိုင်ငံ့အကျိုး
- Motto in English: Increasing education benefits the country
- Type: Public
- Established: 2003 December 09; 22 years ago
- Rector: Dr. Myintzu Min
- Location: Mohnyin District, Mohnyin, Kachin State, Myanmar; 24°47′04.1″N 96°23′21.8″E

Mohnyin University; Burmese: မိုးညှင်းတက္ကသိုလ်, pronounced [móɲɪ́ɰ̃ tɛʔkəθò]; formerly Mohnyin Degree College is a public university located in Ywar Thit Kone quarter, near Htan Ta Pin Village, Mohnyin, Mohnyin Township, Mohnyin District, Kachin State, Myanmar.

== History ==
Main building of Mohnyin University

Construction of the university began on May 14, 2003, and it was initially established as "Mohnyin Degree College" in Mohnyin, Kachin State, on December 9, 2003. It was upgraded to "Mohnyin University" on August 31, 2020. In February 2023, Mohnyin University successfully held its first convocation.

Emphasizing international communication for students, out of the individual and team sports categories in the 32nd Southeast Asian Games held in Cambodia, a student won a third-place medal in Vovinam. Furthermore, three students were successfully selected and sent to participate in international programs: one student joined a youth network initiative focused on anti-narcotics efforts between China and Laos, and another served as a representative of Myanmar's Ministry of Education in the ASEAN-Japan Youth Exchange Program.

The second convocation was held on February 15, 2024, the third on February 5, 2025, and the fourth on February 5, 2026.

== Departments ==
The university comprises 12 departments.

- Department of Myanmar
- Department of English
- Department of Geography
- Department of History
- Department of Philosophy
- Department of Chemistry
- Department of Physics
- Department of Mathematics
- Department of Zoology
- Department of Botany
- Department of Environmental Studies
