= Cyrtodactylus mombergi =

Scientific classification
- Kingdom: Animalia
- Phylum: Chordata
- Class: Reptilia
- Order: Squamata
- Suborder: Gekkota
- Family: Gekkonidae
- Genus: Cyrtodactylus
- Species: C. mombergi

Binomial name
- Cyrtodactylus mombergi Grismer, Wood, Quah, Thura, Herr & Lin, 2019

Species of lizard

Cyrtodactylus mombergi, also known commonly as the Indawgyi bent-toed gecko, is a species of lizard in the family Gekkonidae. The species is endemic to Myanmar.

== Etymology ==
The specific name, mombergi, is in honor of zoologist Frank Momberg for his work in conservation biology and his support of herpetological research in Myanmar.

== Taxonomy ==
C. mombergi was described as a species new to science in 2019. It was discovered in Indawgyi Lake Wildlife Sanctuary.

== Geographic range ==
C. mombergi is found in northern Myanmar, in Kachin State.

== Habitat ==
The preferred natural habitat of C. mombergi is riverine evergreen forest.

== Description ==
Not a large species for its genus, C. mombergi may attain a snout-to-vent length (SVL) of 7.4 cm (2.9 in).

== Reproduction ==
The mode of reproduction of C. mombergi is unknown.
