= 1881 Nicobar Islands earthquake =

Seismic event

- Location within India
- Local date: 31 December 1881
- Local time: 07:49
- Magnitude: 7.9 M_{w}
- Epicenter: 9.25°N 92.70°E
- Areas affected: India, Andaman and Nicobar Islands
- Max. intensity: EMS-98 VII (Damaging)
- Tsunami: yes
- Casualties: none reported

The 1881 Nicobar Islands earthquake occurred at about 07:49 local time (01:49 UTC) on 31 December, with an epicentre beneath Car Nicobar. It occurred as two separate ruptures, the largest of which had an estimated magnitude of 7.9 on the moment magnitude scale and triggered a tsunami that was observed around the Bay of Bengal. It is probably the earliest earthquake for which rupture parameters have been estimated instrumentally.

== Tectonic setting ==
The Nicobar Islands are a series of volcanic islands that are part of an active volcanic arc, formed above the subduction zone where the Indo-Australian plate passes beneath the Burma plate. The convergence along this plate boundary is highly oblique, with the plate vector running at a low angle to the boundary. Most of the strike-slip component of the convergence is accommodated by the Great Sumatran fault, which passes northwards into the Andaman Sea spreading centre. This plate boundary has been the location of many historical megathrust earthquakes. The 1881 rupture area lies almost entirely within that for the M_{w} 9.2 2004 Indian Ocean earthquake, while rupturing less than a third of its down-dip width.

== Damage ==
The Andaman and Nicobar Islands suffered some damage, although the only masonry buildings affected were in Port Blair, including an infantry barrack and a chimney, both of which suffered severe cracking. On Car Nicobar, the coconut plantations and native huts were extensively damaged and sand volcanoes were observed. There were no reported casualties associated with either the earthquake or the subsequent tsunami.

== Characteristics ==
Selected EMS-98 intensities
Intensity	Locations
EMS-98 VII (Damaging)	Car Nicobar
EMS-98 VI (Slightly damaging)	Port Blair
EMS-98 V (Strong)	Chennai
EMS-98 IV (Largely observed)	Banda Aceh, Colombo
EMS-98 III (Weak)	Kolkata
EMS-98 II (Scarcely felt)	Kathmandu, Mangalore
Martin & Szeliga 2010

=== Earthquake ===
The earthquake was very widely felt with reports from many parts of mainland India, Burma and Sumatra, a total area of 2,000,000 square miles (5,200,000 km^{2}). The rupture area, and therefore the magnitude, has been calculated by modelling the observed tsunami arrival times and heights. Two rupture areas have been identified. The larger, and more southerly, measured 150 km x 60 km dipping about 20° to the east with a displacement of 2.7 metres (8.9 ft) and a smaller area to the north dipping 15° to the east with a displacement of 0.9 m (3.0 ft). The larger gives an estimated M_{w} 7.9 event and the smaller a M_{w} 7.0 event.

=== Tsunami ===
The tsunami was recorded by eleven of a series of continuous tide gauges around the Bay of Bengal that had recently been deployed by the Great Trigonometric Survey of India. The ten gauges on the Indian mainland were synchronised using a telegraph to Madras (Chennai) time, while that at Port Blair was set by a chronometer linked to local time. The maximum recorded wave height was 1.22 m (4.0 ft) at Nagapattinam.

== See also ==
- List of historical earthquakes
- List of tsunamis
