= Mogaung Township =

Mogaung Township မိုးကောင်းမြို့နယ်
- Township
- Location in Mohnyin district

- Location in Burma
- Coordinates: 25°18′N 96°56′E
- Country: Burma
- State: Kachin State
- District: Mohnyin District
- Time zone: UTC+6:30 (MST)

Mogaung Township (Burmese: မိုးကောင်းမြို့နယ်) is a township of Mohnyin District in the Kachin State in northern Myanmar. The principal town is Mogaung.
