= Kabaw Fault =

Geological feature in Myanmar

Kabaw Fault is a fault in Myanmar. It was among those that ruptured during the 1762 Arakan earthquake.

== Location ==
Kabaw Fault lies roughly parallel with the Indo-Burmese border near Mizoram at the foothills of the mountains separating the plains of central Myanmar with the Arakan Mountains, extending due south roughly 300 km.
