= Mohnyin =

Mohnyin မိုးညှင်း (မိူင်းယၢင်း)
- Town
- Location in Burma
- Coordinates: 24°47′0″N 96°22′0″E
- Country: Myanmar
- Division: Kachin State
- District: Mohnyin District
- Township: Mohnyin Township

Population (2014)
  - Total: 33,290
  - Religions: Buddhism Christianity Islam
- Time zone: UTC+6.30 (MST)

Mohnyin (Burmese: မိုးညှင်း, Burmese pronunciation: [móɲ̥ɪ́ɰ̃]; Shan: မိူင်းယၢင်း) is a town in Kachin State, Myanmar (Burma). It is the administrative center for both Mohnyin Township and Mohnyin District and it has a population of 33,290. Mohnyin means "land of the snipe" in Shan.

== History ==
The town of Mohnyin was the capital of Mongyang State, also known as Möngyang (Mohnyin), one of the outlying Shan States that was extinguished in 1604.

Shells of different sizes were found in mass on 19 September. Those were found in apple-pie order while rooting up a tree between Mohnyin District Court and the Township General Administration Department. From 19 to 24 October, 3,916 shells of 11 kinds have been dig out from about three feet deep in the ground.

The town has 1 university and 1 college; named Mohnyin University and Government Technical College, Mohnyin.
