= Depth of focus =

Lens optics concept

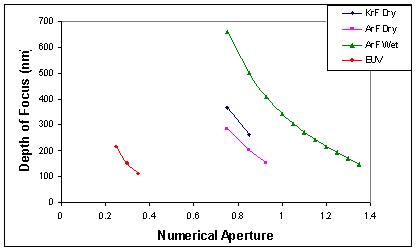
Depth of focus, measured in nanometers, as a function of numerical aperture,

Depth of focus is a lens optics concept that measures the tolerance of placement of the image-capturing plane (the plane of an image sensor or a film in a camera) in relation to the lens. In a camera, depth of focus indicates the tolerance of the film's displacement within the camera and is therefore sometimes referred to as "lens-to-film tolerance".

== Depth of focus versus depth of field ==
The phrase depth of focus is sometimes erroneously used to refer to depth of field (DOF), which is the object position range over which objects are acceptably focused on an image, whereas the depth of focus refers to the zone behind the lens wherein the film plane or image sensor is placed to produce an in-focus image. Depth of field depends on the focus distance, while depth of focus does not.

Depth of focus can have two slightly different meanings. The first is the distance over which the image-capturing plane can be displaced while a single object plane remains on it with acceptably sharp focus;[1][2] the second is the image-side conjugate of depth of field.[2] With the first meaning, the depth of focus is symmetrical about the image plane; with the second, the depth of focus is slightly greater on the far side of the image plane.

While depth of field is generally measured in macroscopic units such as meters and feet, depth of focus is typically measured in microscopic units such as fractions of a millimeter or thousandths of an inch. In optometry depth of focus is usually measured in dioptres.

The same factors that determine depth of field also determine depth of focus, but these factors can have different effects than they have in depth of field. Both depth of field and depth of focus increase with smaller apertures. For distant subjects (beyond macro range), depth of focus is relatively insensitive to focal length and subject distance, for a fixed f-number. In the macro region, depth of focus increases with longer focal length or closer subject distance, while depth of field decreases.

== Determining factors ==
In small-format cameras, the smaller circle of confusion limit yields a proportionately smaller depth of focus. In motion-picture cameras, different lens mount and camera gate combinations have exact flange focal distance measurements to which lenses are calibrated.

The choice to place gels or other filters behind the lens becomes a much more critical decision when dealing with smaller formats. Placement of items behind the lens will alter the optics pathway, shifting the focal plane. Therefore, often this insertion must be done in concert with stopping down the lens in order to compensate enough to make any shift negligible given a greater depth of focus. It is often advised in 35 mm motion-picture filmmaking not to use filters behind the lens if the lens is wider than 25 mm.

== Calculation ==
If the depth of focus relates to a single plane in object space, it can be calculated from

$$t = 2Nc \frac{v}{f},$$

where t is the total depth of focus, N is the lens f-number, c is the circle of confusion, v is the image distance, and f is the lens focal length. In most cases, the image distance (not to be confused with subject distance) is not easily determined; the depth of focus can also be given in terms of magnification m:

$$t = 2Nc (1 + m).$$

The magnification depends on the focal length and the subject distance, and sometimes it can be difficult to estimate. When the magnification is small, the formula simplifies to

$$t \approx 2Nc.$$

The simple formula is often used as a guideline, as it is much easier to calculate, and in many cases, the difference from the exact formula is insignificant. Moreover, the simple formula will always err on the conservative side (i.e., depth of focus will always be greater than calculated).

Following historical convention, the circle of confusion is sometimes taken as the lens focal length divided by 1000 (with the result in same units as the focal length); this formula makes most sense in the case of normal lens (as opposed to wide-angle or telephoto), where the focal length is a representation of the format size. This practice is now deprecated; it is more common to base the circle of confusion on the format size (for example, the diagonal divided by 1000 or 1500).

In astronomy, the depth of focus $\Delta f$ is the amount of defocus that introduces a $\pm \lambda/4$ wavefront error. It can be calculated as

$$\Delta f =  \pm 2 \lambda N^2$$.
