= Geology of Myanmar =

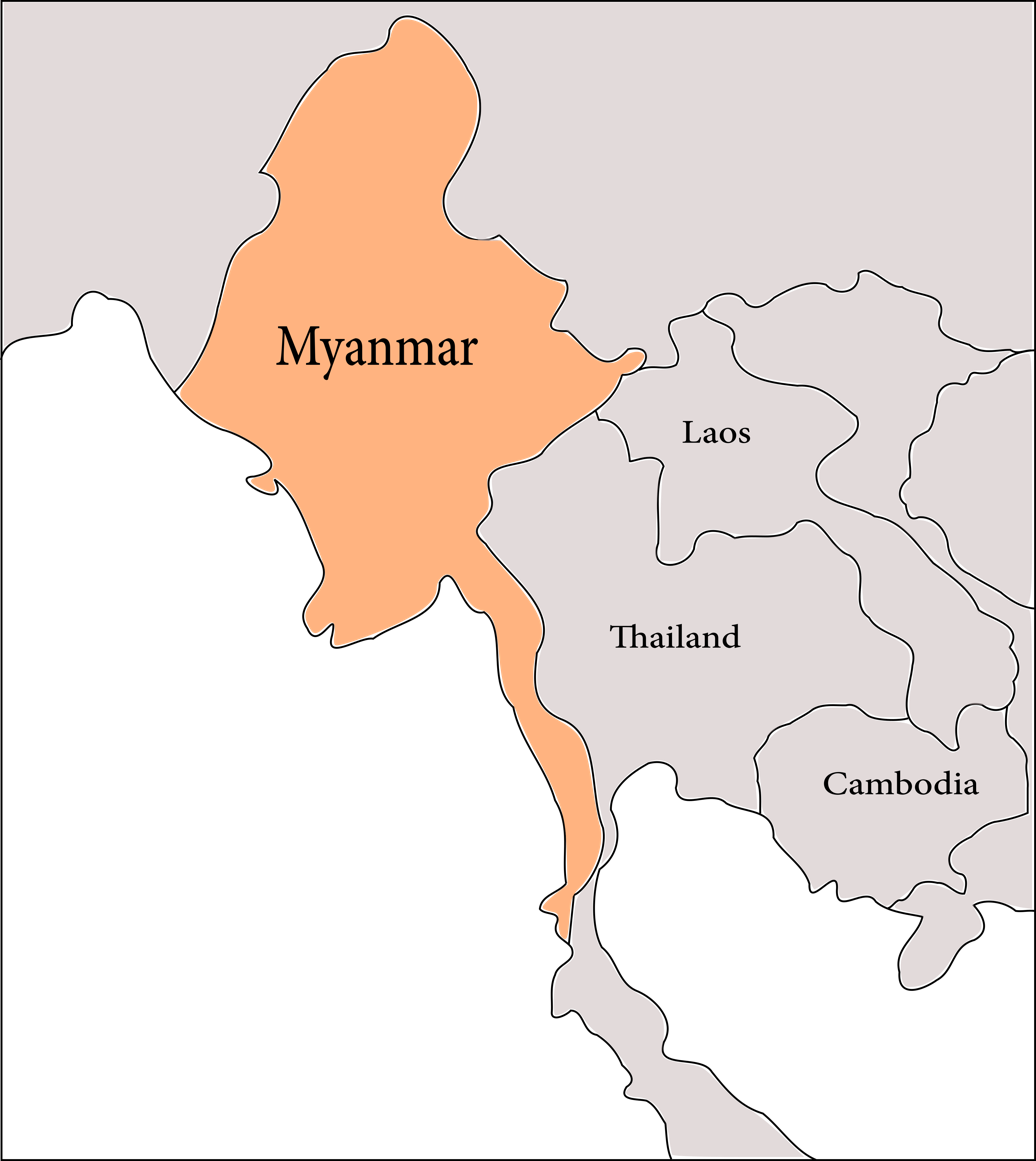
The picture shows the location of Myanmar in Southeast Asia.

The geology of Myanmar is shaped by dramatic, ongoing tectonic processes controlled by shifting tectonic components as the Indian Plate slides northwards and towards Southeast Asia. Myanmar spans across parts of three tectonic plates (the Indian Plate, Burma microplate and Shan Thai Block) separated by north-trending faults. To the west, a highly oblique subduction zone separates the offshore Indian Plate from the Burma microplate, which underlies most of the country. In the center-east of Myanmar, a right lateral strike slip fault extends from south to north across more than 1,000 km (620 mi). These tectonic zones are responsible for large earthquakes in the region. The India-Eurasia plate collision which initiated in the Eocene provides the last geological pieces of Myanmar, and thus Myanmar preserves a more extensive Cenozoic geological record as compared to records of the Mesozoic and Paleozoic eras. Myanmar is physiographically divided into three regions: the Indo-Burman Range, Myanmar Central Belt and the Shan Plateau; these all display an arcuate shape bulging westwards. The varying regional tectonic settings of Myanmar not only give rise to disparate regional features, but also foster the formation of petroleum basins and a diverse mix of mineral resources.

== Regional geology ==
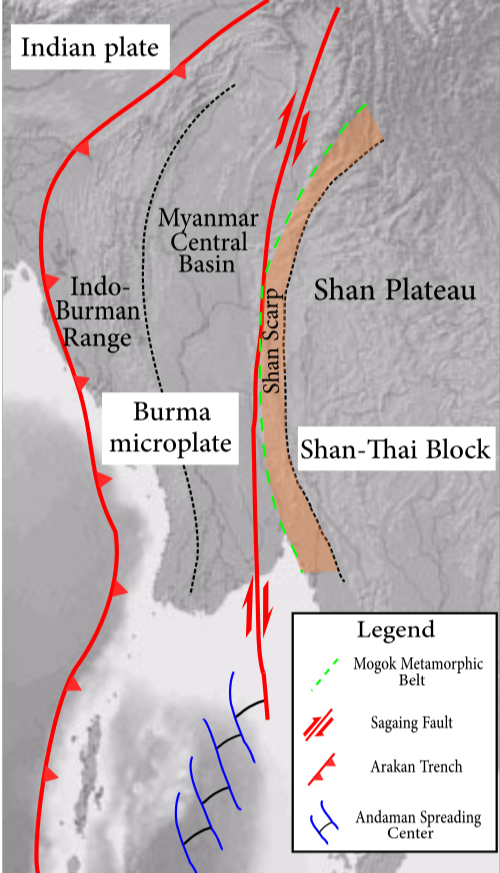
The figure shows a simplified version of the regional features in Myanmar. The three physiographical region from west to east: Indo-Burman Range, Myanmar Central Belt and Shan Plateau. The Mogok Metamorphic Belt (MMB) is expressed with dashed lines. Modified from Bender (1983).

Myanmar is classified into three physiographical regions, each region spans over Myanmar in near NS direction, from west to east is: the Indo-Burman folded mountain ranges, the Myanmar Central Belt (MCB) and the Shan Plateau. To the north of Myanmar, the eastern Himalaya syntaxis bounds the three physiographical region.

=== The arc-shaped structure of Myanmar ===
Myanmar has a complex arc-shaped deformation structure, which is probably due to the a combination of various forces. Aside from the subduction system on the west and the strike-slip fault system in the central Myanmar, another major contribution may be the crustal flow from the Tibet Plateau. The Tibet Plateau is located at the north of Myanmar and has been considerably thickened since the Eocene. A large amount of potential energy stored within the thickened Tibetan crust was released, and resulted in a crustal flow around the eastern Himalaya Syntaxis. The crustal flow runs towards west and into the central region of Myanmar. This crustal flow, along with the accretionary wedge in the subduction system, may have participated in the late Neogene uplift of Indo-Burman Range.

=== Indo-Burman Ranges ===
The Indo-Burman Range sits at the convergent boundary of the Indian and Burma-micro Plates in Myanmar. The subduction between the two plates resulted in the development of accretionary wedges, in order to accommodate the EW shortening along the convergent boundary. Later, thrusting, folding and uplifting formed the Indo-Burman Ranges. The mountain belt comprises various mountains: the Arakan-Yoma mountains and the Chin, Naga, Maniour, Lushai and Patkai hills. The Indo-Burman Range merged with Eastern Himalayan Syntaxis further north, submerged into the Andaman Sea, and resurfaced as Andaman Islands further south.

The Indo-Burman Range bulges towards the west at the center (about 22°N), forming an arc-shaped structure. This arc-shaped structure implies restriction on the convergent motion along the Indian-Burma boundary, therefore the collision intensity varies along the range.

The collision is at a maximum at the center of the Indo-Burman Range around 24°N, which is presented with a broad, high range (up to 20 km wide) and evolves to narrow, low hills in the south (16°N). The collision strikes in NW-SE at the northern part of the Indo-Burman Range (Naga Domain).

=== Myanmar Central Belt ===
The 1000 km Myanmar Central Belt consists of a series of Cenozoic sub-basins between the Indo-Burman Range (west) and Sagaing Fault (east). These basins are generally considered as forearc/back arc basin couplet of the Indo-Burma subduction system. The eight major tertiary sub-basins within the Myanmar Central Belt are Hukwang, Chindwin, Shwebo, Salin, Pyay Embayment, Irrawaddy Delta, Bago-Yoma, and Sittaung Basin.

A variety of structural features—such as oblique-reverse faults, strike slip faults and normal faults—can be found within the central belt. The abundant evidence of shear zones suggests the Myanmar Central Belt has undergone severe internal deformation. The exposed metamorphic lineation along the belt indicates different motions within the central belt: (1) dextral pull apart geometry trending in a north-northwest direction during Oligocene to early Miocene forming an "en-echelon" pull-apart basin: (2) fault-propagated folds cored in a west-dipping thrust fault in the basin center implies an east-west trending transpressional deformation from Pliocene-Pleistocene onwards.

=== Shan Eastern Plateau ===
The Shan Plateau, with an average elevation of 1 kilometre (0.62 mi), forms the eastern highlands of Myanmar. It provides the major topographic relief in Myanmar and it extends towards the southeast to Thailand. The plateau, unlike other regions Myanmar, comprises thick successions of Paleozoic, Mesozoic and even Precambrian sedimentary rocks. The folding, thrusting and uplifting of the Shan Plateau is probably coeval with the transpressional deformation along the Myanmar Central Belt during the commencement of the India-Eurasia collision.

=== Mogok Metamorphic Belt ===
Situated on the east of the Sagaing fault and the west of Shan plateau, the Mogok Metamorphic Belt (MMB) lies at the foothill of Shan Scarp. It runs in a near north-south direction and extends over 1500 km with an average width of 24–40 km. The meta-sedimentary and meta-intrusive belt is composed of marbles, schists, gneisses of upper amphibolite, with locally granulite facies intruded by a deformed granodiorite pluton and pegmatites. The belt also shows evidence for ductile stretching along the north-northwest-south-southeast direction, e.g. lineation, sheath folds and "pencil-like" mullions. Various radiometric dating confirms the age of Mogok Metamorphic Belt predates the Sagaing Fault, and the shear heating of Sagaing Fault has no contribution to the formation of Mogok Metamorphic Belt.

Searle (2007) suggested a five-phased metamorphism and magmatism along the Mogok Metamorphic Belt.

1. Jurassic-Early Cretaceous I-Type intrusion and metamorphism (171–120 Ma)
2. Paleocene-Early Eocene metamorphism of biotite granite sill injection (~59 Ma)
3. Late Eocene-Oligocene metamorphism of sillimanite (37–29 Ma)
4. Late Oligocene-Early Miocene granite magmatism (22–16 Ma)
5. Pliocene-Quaternary volcanism (0–6 Ma)

Note: Ma (mega-annum) is a million years

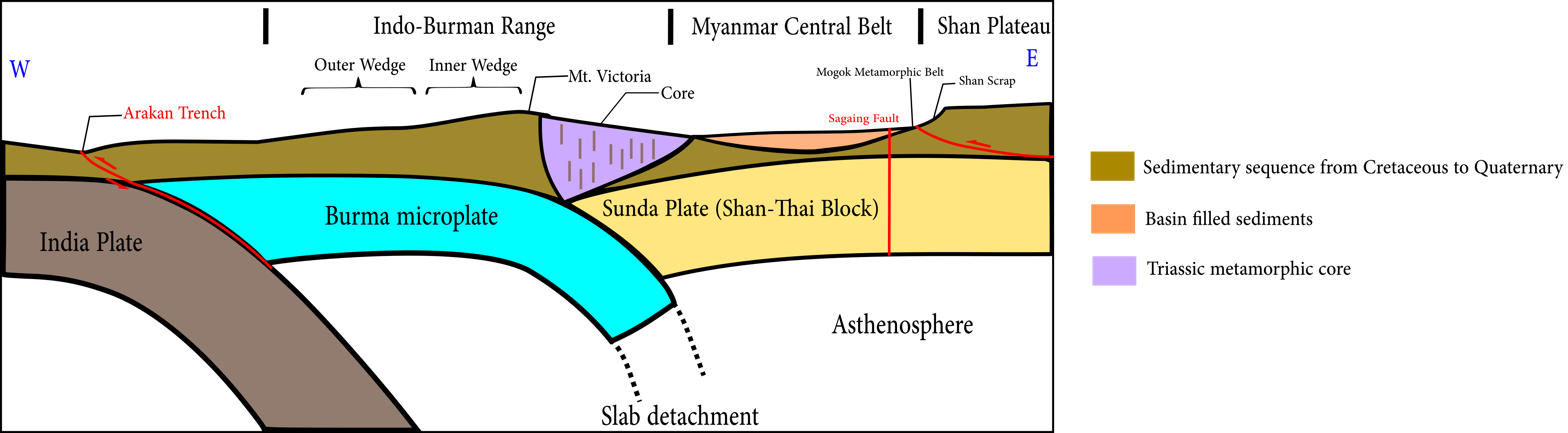
Simplified geological cross section of Myanmar at latitude 21°N. SG refers to Sagaing fault. Inspired and modified from Rangin et al. (2013) and Mitchell (1989).

== Lithology ==
=== Indo-Burman Range ===
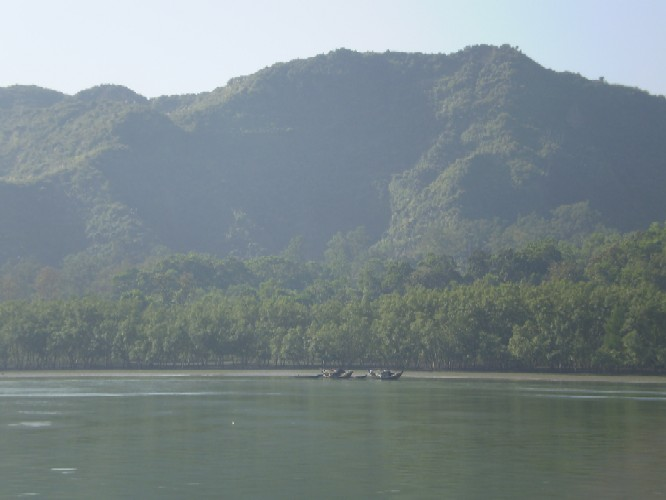
Arakan Mountains in Maungdaw district.

The Indo-Burman Range is a sedimentary belt mainly consisted of Cenozoic flysch sediments and a core of Mesozoic ophiolites dated back to late Jurassic overlain on a thick Mesozoic sequence. All the above unconformity lies on a metamorphic basement dated back to pre-Triassic.

The core Mesozoic ophiolites consists of serpentinite peridotites, pillow basalts and red cherts etc. The obduction of ophiolites is interpreted as the closure of several Neo-Tethys between the Shan-Thai block, Burma microplate and Indian Plate.

The sedimentary sequence overlain by the ophiolites ranges from Late Triassic to Orbitoides-bearing Late Cretaceous carbonates and shales, where part of the sedimentary sequence has undergone high pressure/low temperature blue-schist metamorphism.

The pre-Triassic metamorphic basement composed of Kampetlet schist and gneisses were exposed in the Mount Victoria area in Myanmar. The flysch type sediments in the western flank of the Indo-Burman Range are relatively younger than the folded and thrusted eastern flank.

=== Myanmar Central Belt ===
The Cenozoic pull-apart basins along the Myanmar Central Belt (MCB) are filled-up with 15 km thick Late Cretaceous and Eocene to Late Miocene sediments.

=== The Shan Plateau ===
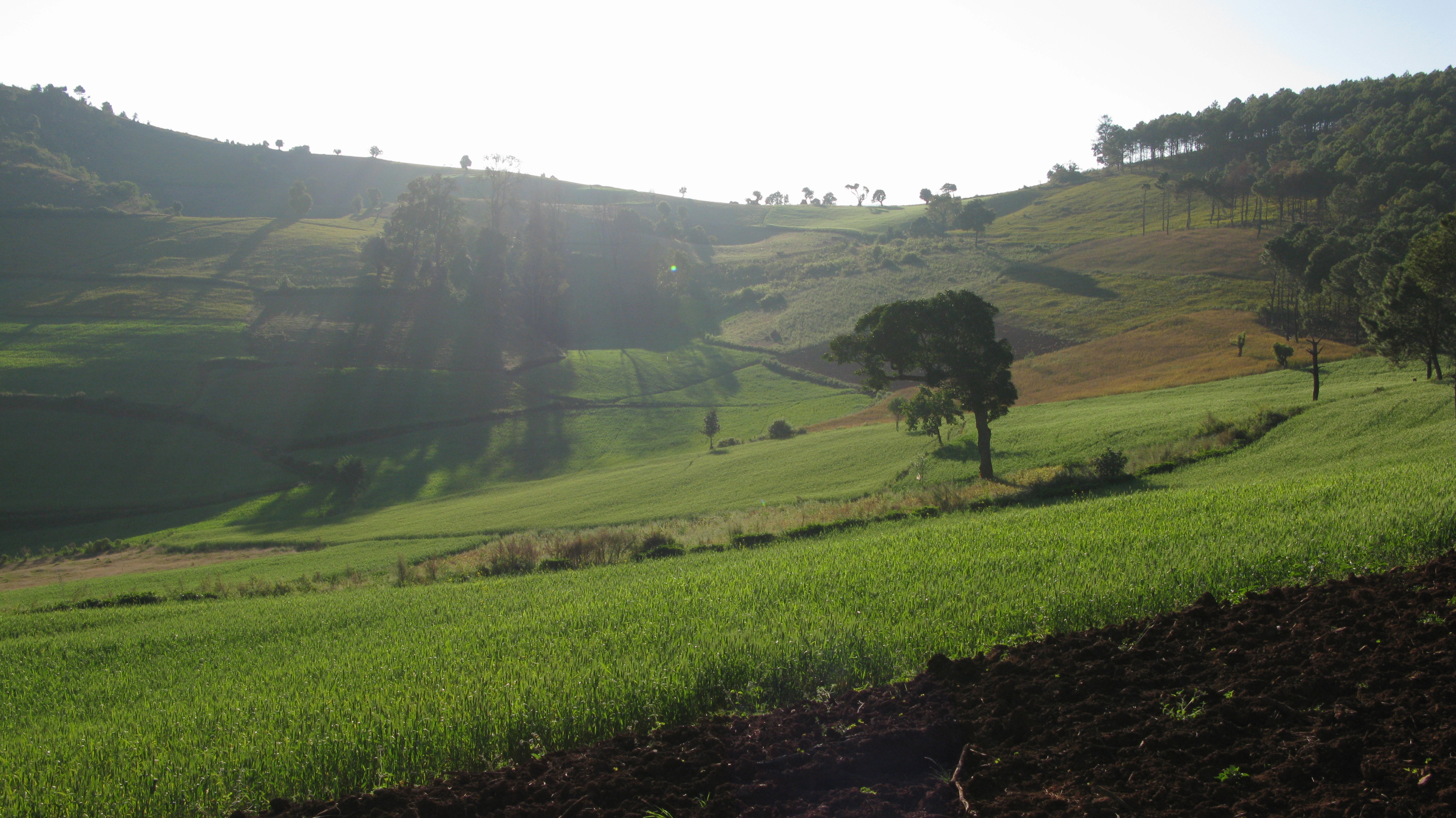
Hills, Kalaw area, Shan Plateau

Belonging to the rigid Shan-Thai block, the Shan Plateau is composed of consolidated partially low-grade metamorphic and Precambrian crystalline rocks overlain with a thick succession of Palaeozoic and Mesozoic sedimentary rocks.

== Tectonic settings ==
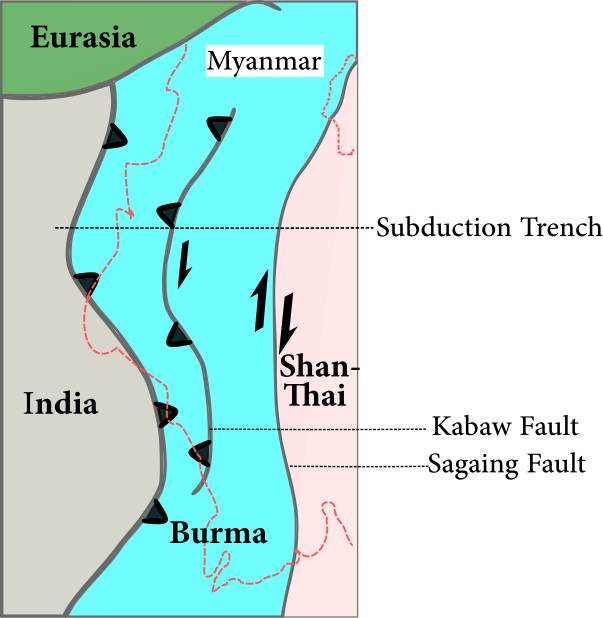
The figure shows the location of plates around Myanmar. Myanmar is traced in dotted red lines, where the strike slip fault is the Sagaing fault and the thrust fault is the Kabaw fault. Modified with Alam et al. (2003)

The tectonic setting of Myanmar consists of a highly oblique convergence on the western boundary, a dextral (right lateral) strike-slip fault in the centre of Myanmar defining the Burma-Sunda boundary and the spreading of Andaman Sea Ridge in the south.

=== Highly oblique Indo-Burma Boundary (Arakan Trench and Andaman Trench) ===
From the Eocene epoch onward, the northward movement of Indian Plate collided with the Eurasian Plate and generated the Himalaya Orogenic belt. The relative motion of the Indian plate against the Eurasian plate (Sunda) has two components (1) 36 mm/year right lateral strike-slip, trending in N10°E direction; (2) 7–9 mm/year east-west convergence. The convergent motion is absorbed by a highly oblique subduction zone between the Indian plate and Burma-micro plate and internal deformation in the centre of Myanmar on the Sagaing Fault.

The obliquity of the Indo-Burma convergent plate boundary (Arakan Trench and Andaman Trench) increases further northwards, with a minimum angle of 58° at 20°N latitude to 70° near 22°N latitude, and rapidly increases to 90° near 24°N latitude and over 90° to further North. The boundary between Indo-Burma region runs further southward into the Bay of Bengal and joins the Sumatra Trench.

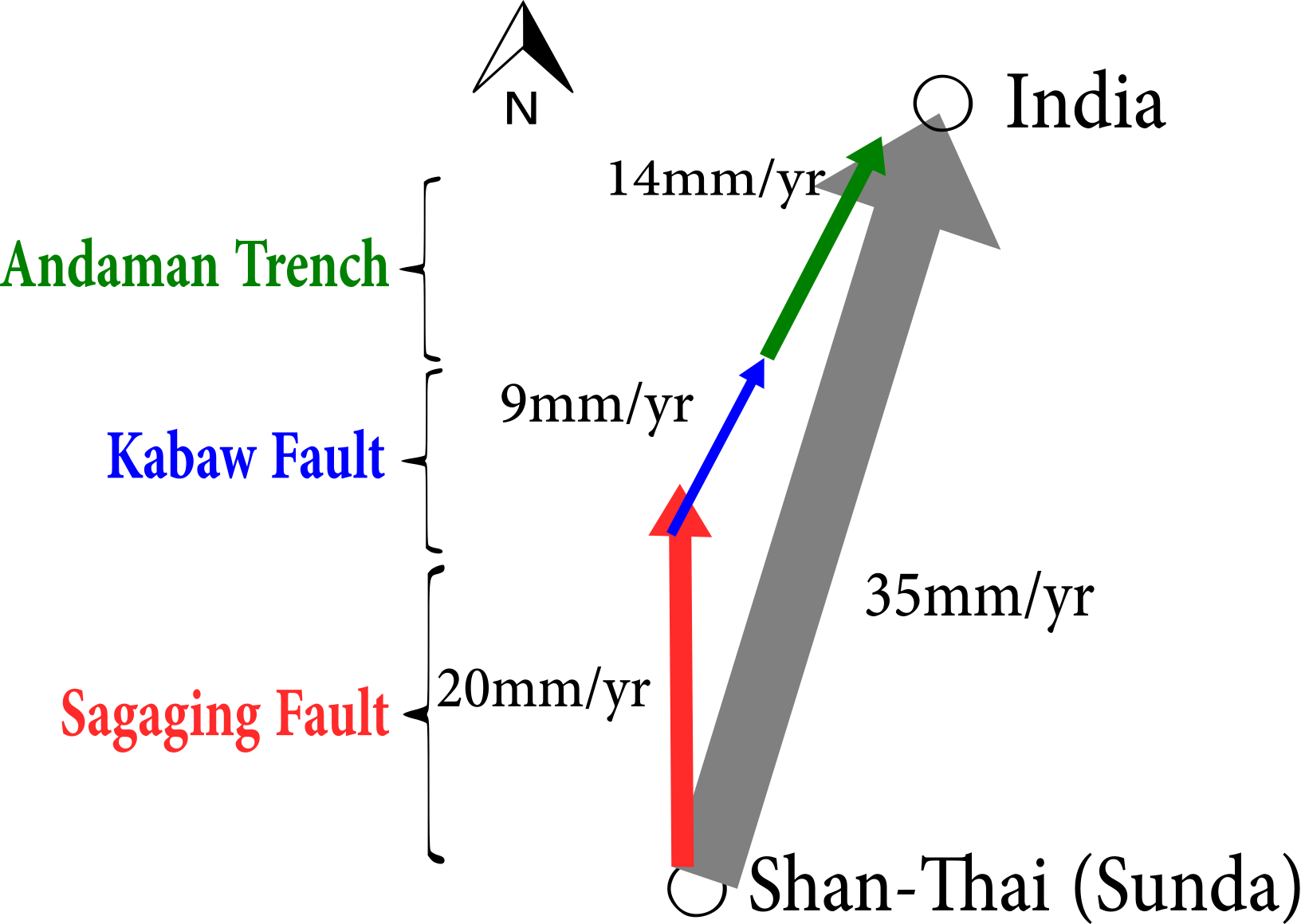
This figure shows the India plate motion with reference to the Shan Thai (Sunda) plate. The N10°E 35 mm/yr convergence is accommodated by the 20 mm/yr right lateral Sagaing strike slip fault, the 9 mm/yr convergent Kabaw thrust fault and 14 mm/yr subduction the Andaman Trench. Modified from Socquet et al. 2006.

=== Fault systems ===
In order to accommodate the India-Eurasia collision, extensive fault systems can be found in Myanmar. The following introduces two of the major fault systems.

==== The Sagaing Fault ====
The 20mm/yr dextral (right lateral) strike slip Sagaing Fault detaches the Burma microplate from the Sunda plate. The arc-parallel fault spans over 1400 km in a north-south direction, remarkably linear for the central 700 km (at 17°N to 23°N latitude) and forms a slight arc shape swinging N10°E and N170°E direction at the north and south ends of the fault respectively. Northward, the Sagaing fault terminates at the Jade Mine belt (~ 24.5°N) and splays into a 200 km width compressive horsetail structure. Southward, it is connected to the active Andaman spreading rift. The onset of seafloor spreading on the Andaman rift puts a minimum 4.5 Ma age constraint on the Sagaing Fault.

The total displacement of the right lateral strike slip fault remains controversial. Curray et al. (1979) suggested a total 460 km of displacement since Miocene; whereas Khin Zaw (1990) proposed 250 km since post Lower Miocene. Guillaume & Rangin (2003) deduced approximately 100 km by constraining a continuous 20mm/yr right lateral strike slip since 4-5Ma.

==== Shan Scarp ====
The topographic boundary separating the Myanmar Central Basin (MCB) and the Shan Plateau (or Eastern Highland) is referred as the Shan Scarp. The abrupt elevation over a short distance (up to 1.8 km over few km) harbors the trace of reverse faults and largely overturned folds. The Shan Scarp aligns parallel to the Sagaing fault on the east. The general trend of reverse fault strikes is N20°W and dips in the east-northeast direction; where some N20°E striking normal faults were identified along the fault scarp (at 21°N to 22°N latitude), north of Mandalay. Dextral (right lateral) strike slip motion is also observed along the fault scarp, this motion is reasonably expected due to the nearby right lateral Sagaing fault. Southward, the Shan Scarp ends at the junction with the Three Pagodas fault.

Along the foothills of the Shan Scarp, steady-state stretching ductile deformation trending in NNW-SSE direction was identified and is compatible with the extensive force that generates the en-echelon pull apart basin in Myanmar Central Belt (MCB).

The above evidence suggests ductile deformation along Myanmar Central Belt (MCB) should occur prior to the brittle deformation along Sagaing fault and the Shan Scarp fault.

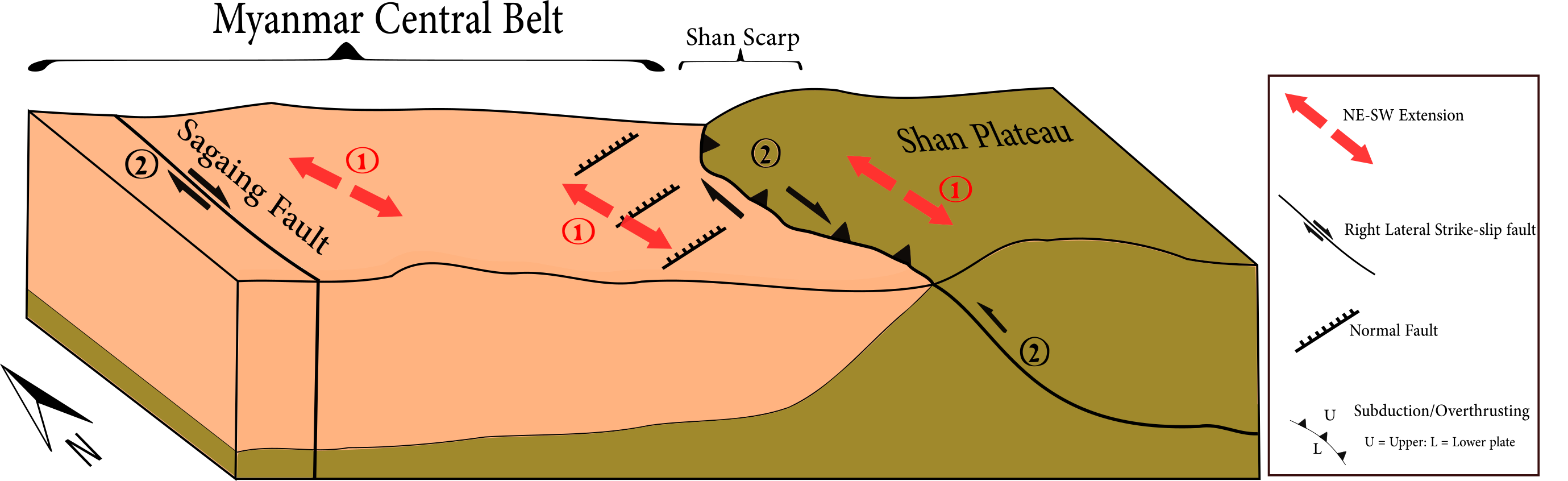
Simplified diagram showing the tectonic deformation along Shan Plateau and the Sagaing fault. 1) The NE-SW extensional ductile deformation along this region was dated prior to Late Miocene. 2) The brittle dextral strike slip fault and thrust fault along the Shan Scarp and the Sagaing fault is dated back to Plio-Pleistocene period. Modified from Bertrand et al. (2003)

== Geological evolution of Myanmar ==
Myanmar lies on the boundary of three tectonic plates (India, Burma-micro and Sunda Plate), thus its geological evolution is highly dependent on the plate tectonic events in this region. In the following, the geological evolution of Myanmar will be explained in the order of geological timescale. Only major tectonic events are recorded with some missing timescale where no major events occurred.

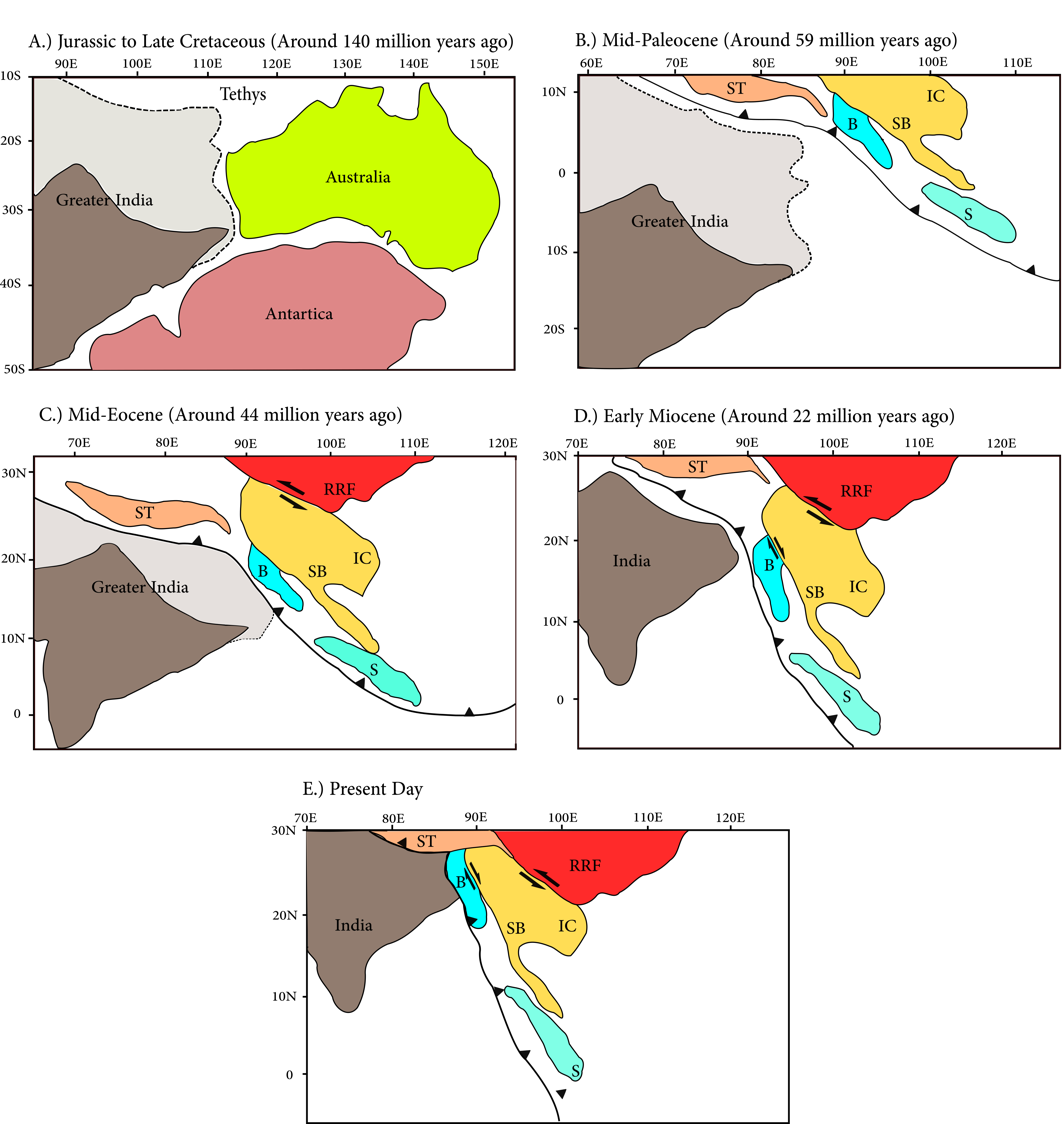
A simplified geological evolution of Myanmar. (ST=South Tibet; B= Burma; IC=Indochina; S=Sumatra; RRF=Red River Fault; SB= Shan-Thai Block). (a) The rifting of Gondwana (b) The start of "soft collision" between India and Southeast Asia. (c) The start of "hard collision" between India and South Asia. (d) The time for major collision between India, South Tibet and Burma; where Burma, Shan-Thai Block rotates clockwise to the present position. Modified from Alam et al. (2003).

=== Paleozoic Era ===
==== Permian (~ 300 million years ago) ====
In the early Permian, a continental block rifted from Gondwanaland. The continental plate has been variously termed: Shan-Thai, Sibumasu, or Sinoburmalaya. This continental block harbors features of glaciogenic marine diamictite unit, indicating its origin from Gondwanaland. The Shan-Thai block was probably located northwest of Australia plate during the Gondwanaland period.

=== Mesozoic Era ===
==== Late Triassic to Jurassic Period (~ 235 – 145 million years ago) ====
In the mid-late Triassic, the Shan-Thai block collided with the Indo-China block, and under-thrusted an ophiolite and associated arc system in the northeast. A foreland thrust belt developed along the collision of the two blocks and laid the foundation of the Shan Plateau.

A thick flysch unit with fossils and deltaic sediments were deposited along the northeastern Shan-Thai block (now Shan Plateau) with the closing of a shallow sea region between the two blocks prior to collision. Large-scale intrusion of granitoid plutons and batholiths were induced by oceanic subduction; and partial melting of metasedimentary rocks within the foreland thrust belt led to tin-tungsten mineralization (the Central Tin Belt).

==== Cretaceous Period (~ 145 – 66 million years ago) ====
The India Plate departed from the Gondwanaland and headed northwards at a rate of 10 cm/yr during the Cretaceous Period.

The rifted Burma-microplate from Gondwanaland also docked against Shan-Thai block and together formed part of the Sunda plate approximately in the period. There is a discrepancy for the time of the Burma-Shan-Thai collision: Mitchell (1989) says Early Cretaceous yet changes to Mid-Eocene in 1993; Hutchison (1989) says Late Cretaceous; and Acharyya (1998) says late Oligocene.

=== Cenozoic Era ===
==== Early Eocene to Miocene (~ 55 - 10 million years ago) ====
In early Eocene, the start of a hard continent-to-continent collision between India and the Eurasia Plate led to the formation of the Himalayan Orogeny. On the eastern margin of the India plate, high oblique subduction occurs between the boundary of India and the Burma-micro plate.

Between late Eocene to Miocene, the Burma and Shan-Thai block rotated 30° to 40° clockwise, to accommodate the major collision along the plate boundary. This resulted in the trend of arc shifting from east-west to the north-south direction.

The subduction boundary forms an accretionary prism and eventually with thrusting and folding forms the Indo-Burma Range.

==== Late Miocene onwards (~ 10 million years ago) ====
In late Miocene to Pliocene, the slab detachment of Burma-microplate beneath the Shan-Thai block induced in a mantle window into the slab and resulted in alkaline and calk-alkaline volcanism along the Myanmar Central Belt.

In the late Miocene (10 million years ago), the Myanmar Central Belt underwent a major regional plate kinematic reorganization transition. The tectonic regimes transform from northwest-southeast extensional force to basin inversion and was followed by a major uplift event caused by east-west compression during Plio-Pleistocene period.

== Geological resources ==
=== Mineral belts ===
Myanmar hosts a variety of ore-deposits with economic significance and global recognition. It is a global source of true jade and produces some of the world's finest rubies, with mines in the Mogok Valley providing the bulk of the world's supply for centuries.

Myanmar's mineral deposits into different distinct metallogenic provinces by various workers. The following outlines the nine major ones:

1. Magmatic-hydrothermal granite and pegmatite-hosted minerals: World-class tin and tungsten mineralization can be found in the southern Myanmar. These mineralizations are often associated with Late Cretaceous-Eocene intrusive granites. It is dated around 45-62 Ma.
2. Skarn: Found along the Mogok Metamorphic belt, the native gold and base metal sulfide is hosted within phlogopite-bearing amphibolite-grade marbles. The age of the granite is dated back to 17Ma with zircon U-Pb geochronology.
3. Porphyry: The base metal sulphide and Au deposits are associated with magmatic intrusions. The mineralization at Shangalon in Myanmar is related with fine-grained diorite intrusion into the hosting batholith at 40Ma.
4. Epithermal: The epithermal Au-Cu mineralization along with auriferous quartz veins are hosted by Cretaceous granodiorite and diorite magmatic rocks.
5. Ultramafic: The ultramafic-hosted deposits are discovered along with ophiolite fragments within the Myanmar. The Tagaung-Myitkyina Belt (TMB) comprises ophiolitic mantle peridotite and is a source of nickel laterite. In the Hpakant region, extensive pure jade can be found. The Indo-Burman Range (e.g. Chin and Naga Hills) also harbors many Chromite and nickel deposits.
6. Orogenic Au: Gold mineralization in Myanmar is inferred as Orogenic type and or Cretaceous–Paleogene fault zone related.
7. Sediment-hosted Pb-Zn: Several lead-zinc sulphide deposits hosted in carbonate rocks were found in the Upper Palaeozoic carbonate sequence of Shan Plateau.
8. Gemstone: The finest rubies are sourced from Mogok Metamorphic Belt derived from marbles. The gem-quality rubies are formed under an Eocene-Oligocene high temperature metamorphism.
9. Sediment hosted Epithermal Au: The Kyaukpahto Mine is the largest gold-producing mine located around the Sagaing Division in Myanmar. Gold mineralization here is formed during extensional faulting (probably due to Sagaing fault) and intense hydrothermal alteration and silicification in late Eocene.

=== Petroleum basin ===
The hydrocarbon basins in Myanmar are mostly situated in the Central Myanmar Belt, e.g. Salin Basin, Chindwin Basin and Hukawng Basin over 1000 km. The formations that compose the hydrocarbon basins are sedimentary rocks of Eocene through mid-Mioceneand sealed with interbedded Oligocene and Miocene shales and clays.
