= Mohnyin Township =

Mohnyin Township မိုးညှင်းမြို့နယ်
- Township
- Location in Mohnyin district

- Location in Burma
- Coordinates: 24°47′N 96°22′E
- Country: Myanmar (Burma)
- State: Kachin State
- District: Mohnyin District
- Capital: Mohnyin
- Time zone: UTC+6:30 (MST)

Mohnyin Township (Burmese: မိုးညှင်းမြို့နယ်; also Kamaing Township) is a township of Mohnyin District in the Kachin State of Burma (Myanmar). The principal town and administrative centre is Mohnyin. Jade and gem quality kyanite are produced in Mohnyin Township, as well as amber, gold, asafoetida, and jasper. Indawgyi Lake Wildlife Sanctuary is located in the central north of the township.

Hopin Sub-township is part of Mohnyin Township. Hopin Sub-township comprises one town, four wards, 8 village tracts and 27 villages in 2012. There are 8,315 households with a population of 49,160. The area of Hopin Sub-township is 642 square kilometres (247.9 sq mi). It is 35 kilometres (22 mi) from Mohnyin.

== Villages ==
- Lajayang

== See also ==
- Mohnyin District
- Mohnyin University
