= 2016 Chauk earthquake =

Earthquake in Myanmar

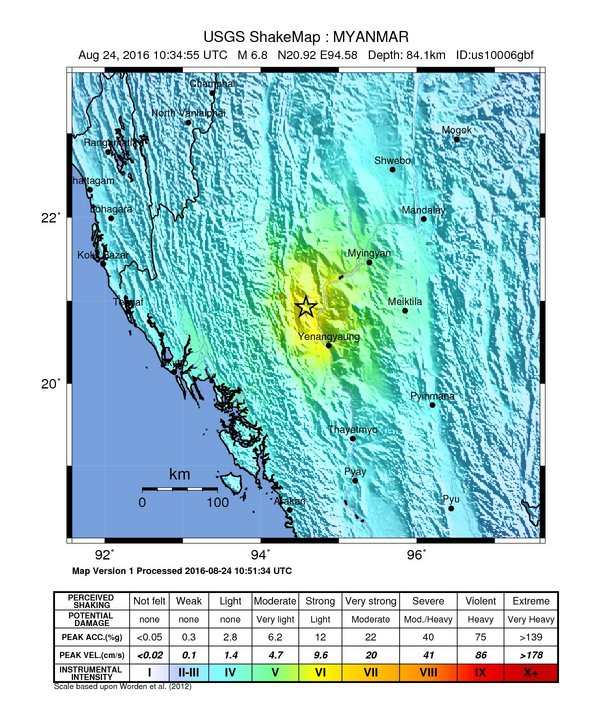

- Location within Myanmar
- UTC time: 2016-08-24 10:34:54
- ISC event: 611830425
- USGS-ANSS: ComCat
- Local date: 24 August 2016
- Local time: 17:04
- Magnitude: 6.8 M_{w}
- Depth: 84.1 km (52.3 mi)
- Epicenter: 20.923°N 94.569°E
- Areas affected: Bangladesh; India; Myanmar; Thailand
- Max. intensity: MMI VI (Strong)
- Casualties: 4 dead

A magnitude 6.8 earthquake struck Myanmar 25 km (16 mi) west of Chauk on 24 August 2016 with a maximum Mercalli intensity of VI (Strong). It struck at 5:04 pm local time (10:34 UTC), and was centered in an isolated area. The estimated depth was 84.1 km. Tremors from the earthquake were felt in Yangon, in the eastern cities of Patna, Guwahati, and Kolkata in India, in Bangkok in Thailand and in Dhaka, the capital of Bangladesh. According to reports, several temples in the nearby ancient city of Bagan were damaged and four people were reported dead.

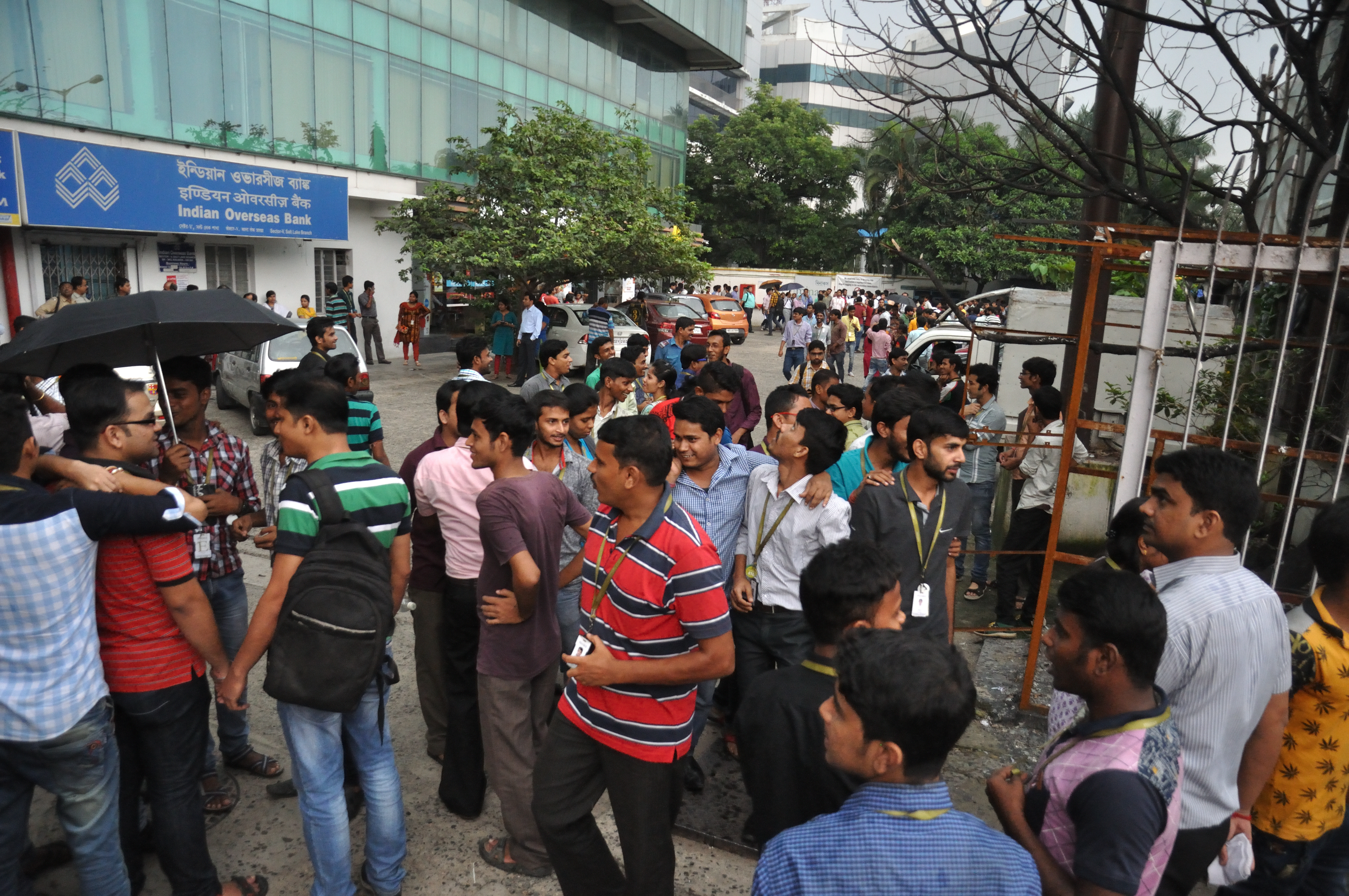
The earthquake led to an office evacuation in Kolkata.

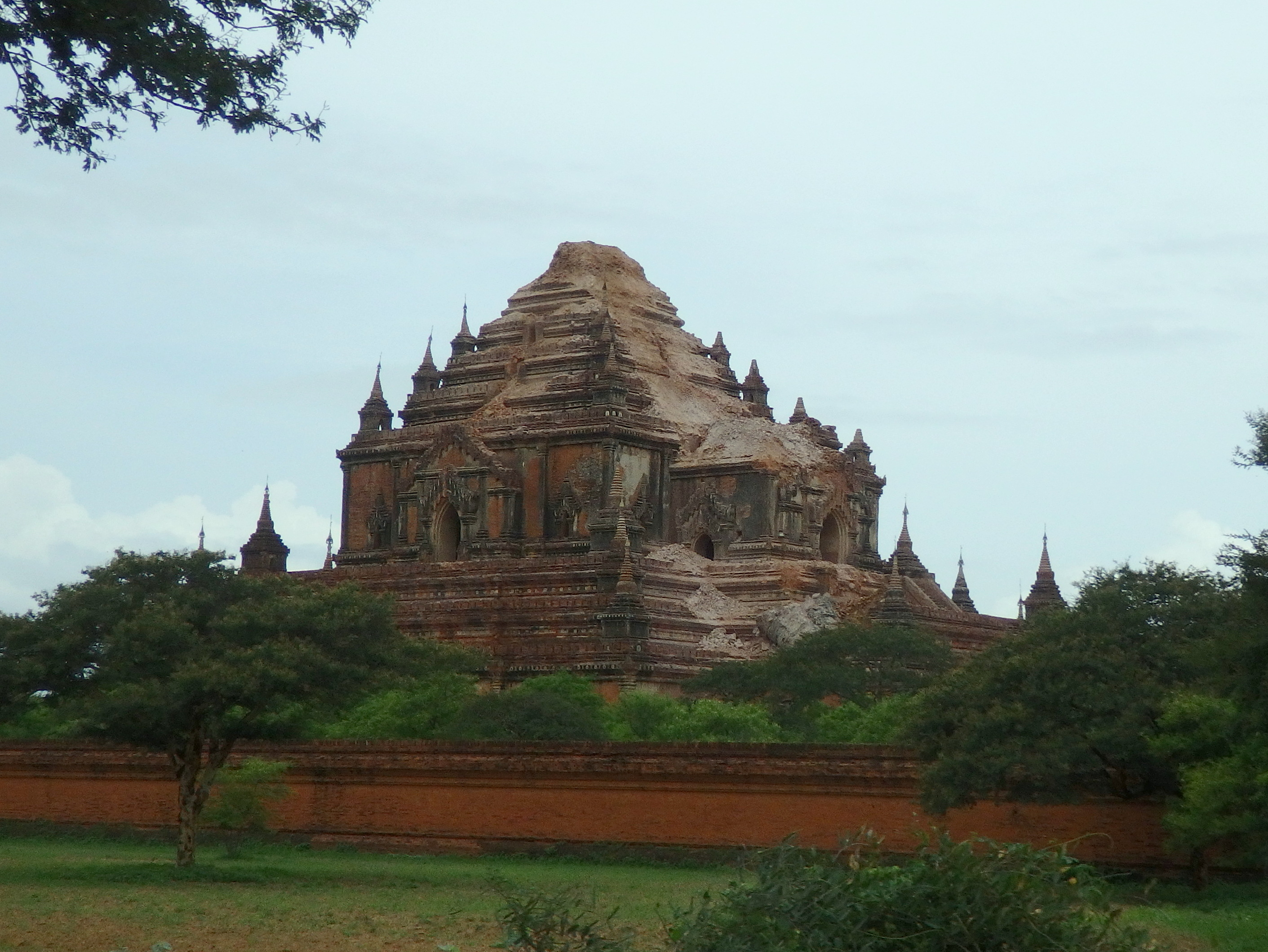
Damage to one of the temples at Bagan

== See also ==
- List of earthquakes in 2016
- List of earthquakes in Myanmar
