= 1762 Arakan earthquake =

Earthquake in Bangladesh and Myanmar

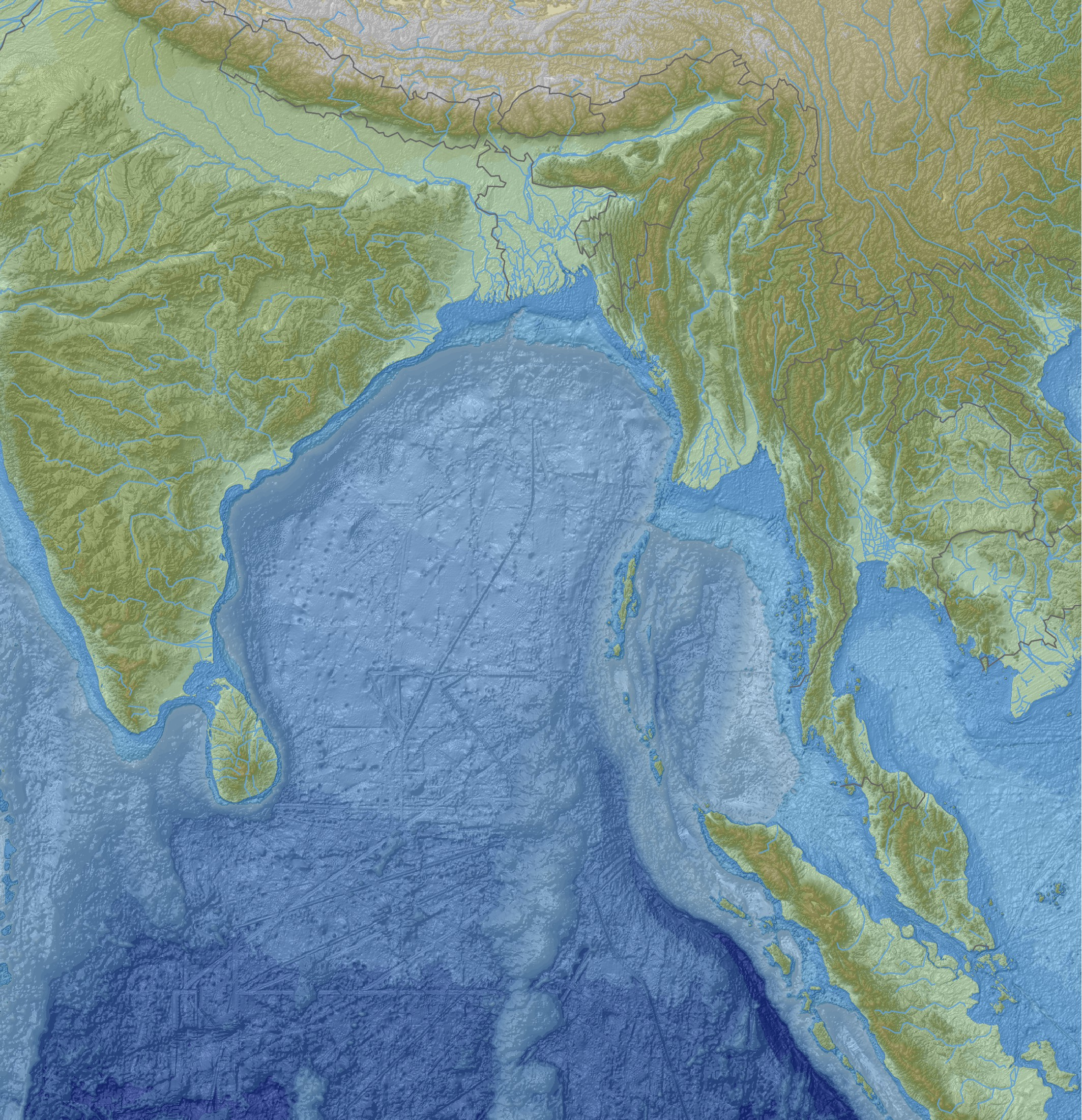
- Location within Bay of Bengal
- Local date: 2 April 1762
- Local time: 17:00
- Magnitude: 8.5–8.8 M_{w}
- Epicentre: 22.0°N 92.0°E
- Type: Megathrust
- Areas affected: Chittagong and Arakan
- Max. intensity: MMI XI (Extreme)
- Tsunami: Yes
- Casualties: 200+

The 1762 Arakan earthquake occurred at about 17:00 local time on 2 April, with an epicentre somewhere along the coast from Chittagong (modern Bangladesh) to Arakan in modern Myanmar. It had an estimated moment magnitude between 8.5 and 8.8 and a maximum estimated intensity of XI (Extreme). It triggered a local tsunami in the Bay of Bengal and caused at least 200 deaths. The earthquake was associated with major areas of both uplift and subsidence. It is also associated with a change in the course of the Brahmaputra River from east of Dhaka (Old Brahmaputra River) to 150 kilometres (93 mi) to the west via the Jamuna River.

== Tectonic setting ==
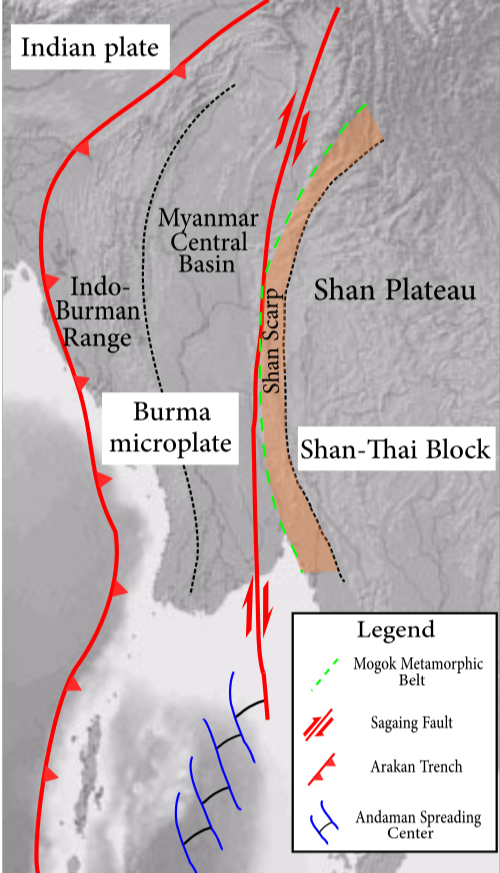
Tectonic map of Myanmar with the oblique convergent boundary, the Arakan Trench

The eastern part of Bangladesh and the southwestern part of Burma lie along the highly oblique convergent boundary between the Indian plate and the Eurasian plate. The degree to which this deformation is partitioned into zones of thrust tectonics (accommodating that part of the motion perpendicular to the boundary) and strike-slip tectonics (accommodating the northward movement of the Indian plate) varies along the boundary. A pure strike-slip boundary that strikes parallel to the plate vector runs along the Western Burma Scarp, which is replaced to the north by the Indo-Burmese Wedge fold and thrust belt, at the western edge of the boundary zone, and a series of major dextral (right lateral) strike-slip faults, particularly the Kabaw Fault and Sagaing Fault further to the east. The presence of active subduction along the eastern margin of the Bay of Bengal is disputed.

== Earthquake ==
The earthquake lasted for about four minutes at Chittagong. The epicentre is not well-constrained, and likely locations have varied from near Chittagong to along the Arakan coast. The extent of the rupture is uncertain but may have been as much as 700 km (430 mi) along the plate interface. This is based both on the extent of uplift, which was recorded along the coast of Burma from Foul Island to Ramree Island, and the area of subsidence around Chittagong, further north. The 700 km (430 mi) extent combined with an estimated displacement of ten metres gives a maximum estimated magnitude of 8.8 on the moment magnitude scale. More recent research suggested a shorter rupture measuring 500 km (310 mi), which combined with an estimated displacement of 9 to 16 meters gives an estimated magnitude of 8.5 on the moment magnitude scale. Other workers have pointed out that neither the subsidence, which could be due to lateral spreading, nor the uplift, which is not unequivocally linked to the 1762 earthquake, necessarily provide a reasonable estimate for the size of this event and prefer to regard this as a magnitude 7–8 earthquake.

Studies of uplifted marine terraces along the Burmese coast have found evidence for three uplifts, the most recent of which is interpreted to be from the 1762 earthquake. The St. Martin's Island has been uplifted by 2–2.5 m (6 ft 7 in – 8 ft 2 in) during that earthquake. A repeat period of about 500 to 700 years was suggested for earthquakes similar to that in 1762.

== Tsunami ==
A tsunami was reported along the northeastern coast of the Bay of Bengal and at Dhaka and Kolkata. This is regarded as a local tsunami, as no effects were recorded on the western side of the bay.

== Damage ==
In Chittagong, it was reported that no buildings or walls built of brick had escaped either destruction or serious damage. The East India Company's factory inside the fort was so badly damaged that it could no longer be safely used. An area of about 60 square miles (160 km^{2}) permanently subsided beneath the sea along the coast near Chittagong. At Bar Chara, just north of Cox's Bazar, the land sank and 200 people were killed. Chittagong was said to have "suffered severely" with soil liquefaction effects such as sand volcanoes and ground fissures.

== See also ==
- List of historical earthquakes
- List of earthquakes in Myanmar
- List of earthquakes in Bangladesh
