= 2016 Kani earthquake =

Earthquake in Myanmar

2016 Myanmar earthquake
- Location within Myanmar
- UTC time: 2016-04-13 13:55:17
- ISC event: 611829306
- USGS-ANSS: ComCat
- Local date: 13 April 2016
- Local time: 20:25
- Magnitude: 6.9 M_{w}
- Depth: 134.8 km (83.8 mi)
- Epicenter: 23.133°N 94.900°E
- Areas affected: Bangladesh; India; Myanmar; Nepal
- Max. intensity: MMI VI (Strong)
- Aftershocks: 1
- Casualties: 2 dead 120 injured

A magnitude 6.9 earthquake struck Myanmar 135 km (84 mi) north-west of Mandalay on April 13 with a maximum Mercalli intensity of VI (Strong). It struck at 8:25 pm local time (13:55 UTC), and was centered in an isolated area. The estimated depth was 134 km. It lasted for around one minute according to Xinhua reporters.

== Damage and casualties ==
=== Myanmar ===
Homes, buildings and schools were damaged or destroyed in villages near the epicenter in Myanmar. Three religious structures in Kani Township were severely damaged, while the rooftop of a community building collapsed.

=== India ===
In India, at least two people died and more than 107 were reported to have been injured. One of the deaths occurred in Guwahati, where a person was killed after being electrocuted by a fallen electric pole. Building damage and injuries occurred in the states of Arunachal Pradesh, Assam, Bihar, Manipur, Odisha, and West Bengal. In the city of Kolkata, some buildings were cracked.

=== Bangladesh ===
Across the country, more than 80 people were injured, including workers rushing out of Ready Made Garment factories. Many structures nationwide were damaged or destroyed. Nine buildings were tilted in Chittagong, including three which were deemed as "dangerous". Some fifty persons suffered injuries in the Bangladeshi capital Dhaka and north eastern city of Sylhet as they fled their homes and other buildings during the earthquake. Tremors were also felt in eastern and central Nepal.

== See also ==
- List of earthquakes in 2016
- List of earthquakes in Myanmar
- List of earthquakes in India
- List of earthquakes in Bangladesh
