= Mohnyin District =

District in Myanmar

Coordinates: 24°47′N 96°22′E

- District

Government
  - Body: Kachin State Government

Mohnyin District (Burmese: မိုးညှင်းခရိုင်) is a district of the Kachin State in northern Myanmar (Burma). The administrative center is Mohnyin.

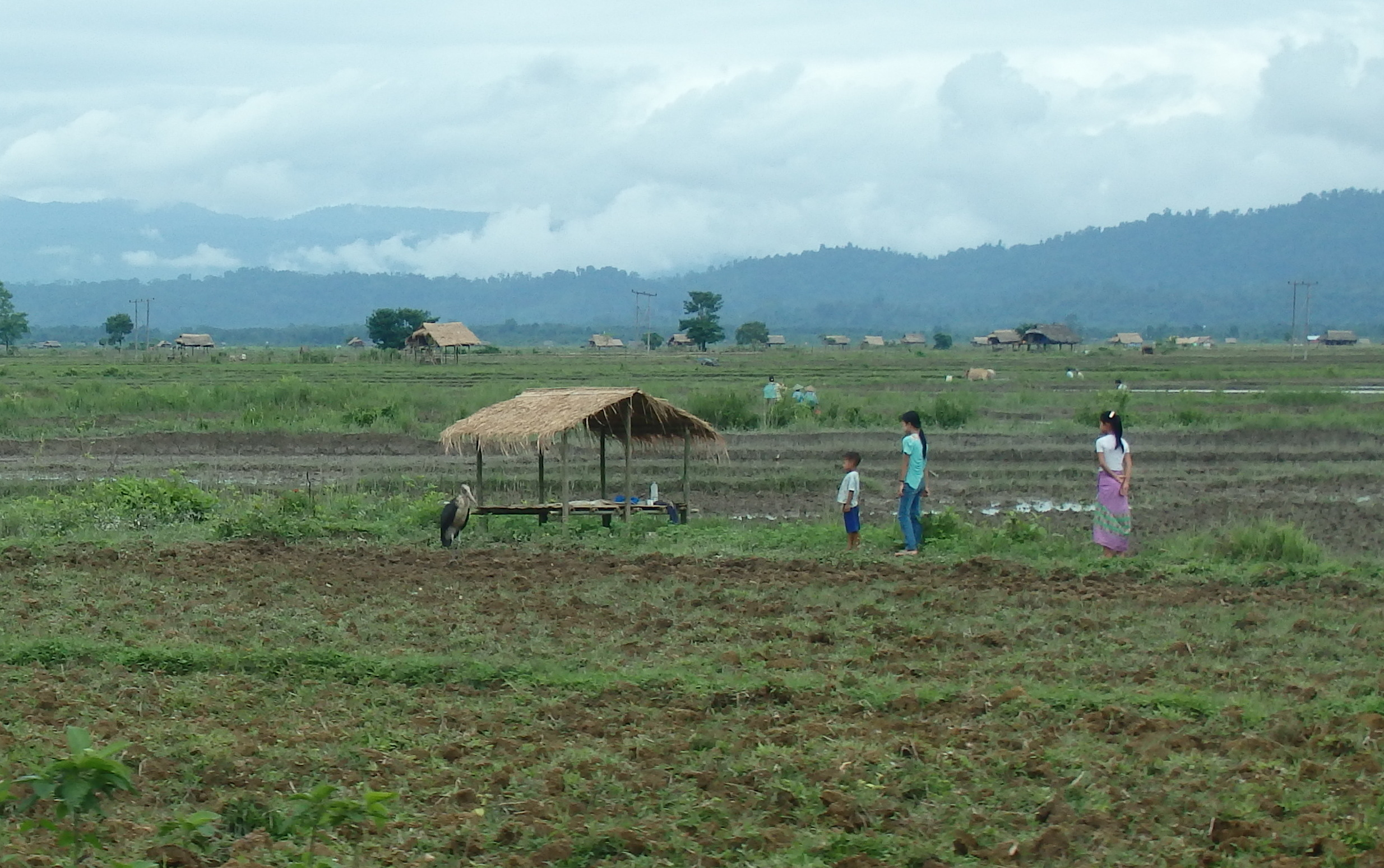
Countryside of Mohnyin District

== Townships ==
The district contains the following three townships:

- Mongyaung Township
- Mohnyin Township
- Hpakant Township (Kamaing Township)

== See also ==
- Mongyang State, a Shan state in what is today, Burma; the main town was Mohnyin.
- Mohnyin Township
- Mohnyin University
