= Burma plate =

Minor tectonic plate in Southeast Asia

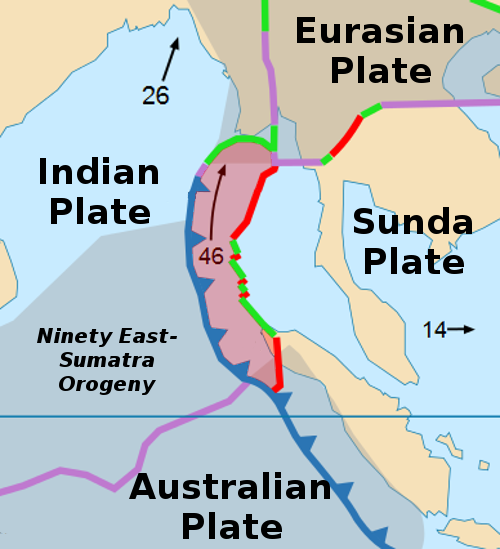
- Depicted at center, shaded in light red
- Type: Minor
- Approximate area: 1,100,000 km^{2} (420,000 sq mi)
- Movement^{1}: north
- Speed^{1}: 46 mm/year
- Features: Andaman Sea
- ^{1}Relative to the African plate

The Burma plate is a minor tectonic plate or microplate located in Southeast Asia, sometimes considered a part of the larger Eurasian plate. The Andaman Islands, Nicobar Islands, and northwestern Sumatra are located on the plate. This island arc separates the Andaman Sea from the main Indian Ocean to the west.

To its east lies the Sunda plate, from which it is separated along a transform boundary, running in a rough north–south line through the Andaman Sea. This boundary between the Burma and Sunda plates is a marginal seafloor spreading centre, which has led to the opening up of the Andaman Sea (from a southerly direction) by "pushing out" the Andaman-Nicobar-Sumatra island arc from mainland Asia, a process which began in earnest approximately 4 million years ago.

To the west is the much larger India plate, which is subducting beneath the western facet of the Burma plate. This extensive subduction zone has formed the Sunda Trench.

== Tectonic history ==
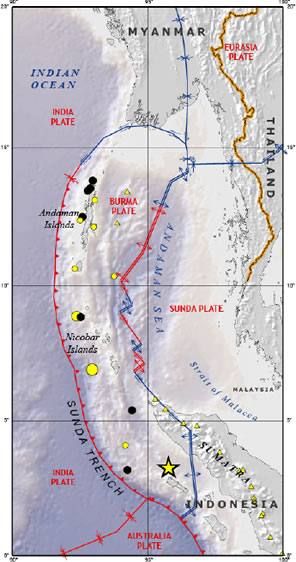
The Burma plate, showing boundaries with the India plate (the Sunda Trench) and the Sunda plate (through the Andaman Sea)

In models of the reconstructed tectonic history of the area, the generally northwards movement of the Indo-Australian plate resulted in its substantive collision with the Eurasian continent, which began during the Eocene epoch, approximately 50–55 million years ago (Ma). This collision with Asia began the orogenic uplift which has formed the Himalaya mountains, as well as the fracturing of the Indo-Australian plate into the modern Indian plate, Australian plate, and possibly Capricorn plate.

As the India plate drifted northwards at a relatively rapid rate of an average 16 cm/yr, it also rotated in a counterclockwise direction. As a result of this movement and rotation, the convergence along the plate's eastern boundary (the Burma–Andaman–Malay region) with Eurasia was at an oblique angle.

The transform forces along this subduction front started the clockwise bending of the Sunda arc; in the late Oligocene (ca. 32 Ma) further faulting developed and the Burma and Sunda microplates began to "break off" from the larger Eurasian plate.

After a further series of transform faulting, and the continuing subduction of the India plate beneath the Burma plate, backarc spreading saw the formation of the marginal basin and seafloor spreading centre which would become the Andaman Sea, a process well-underway by the mid-Pliocene (3–4 Ma).

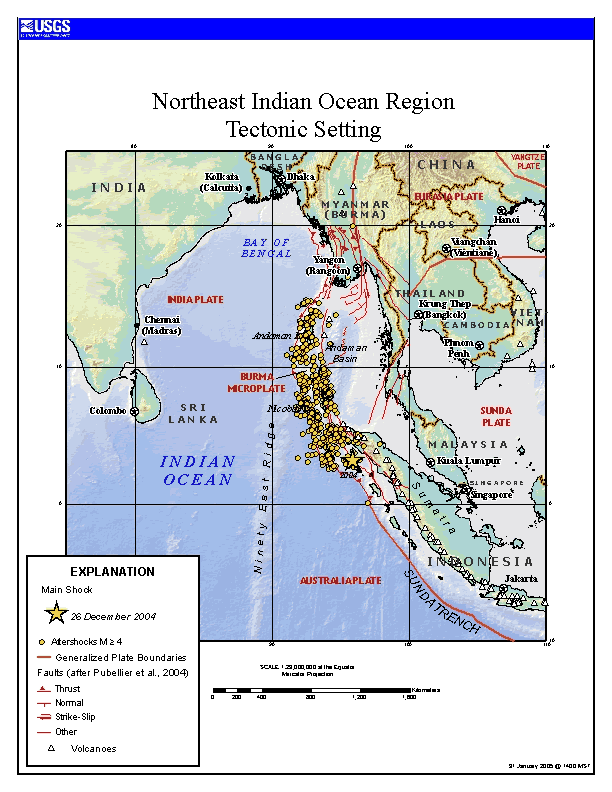
Western Sunda Arc and Trench showing tectonic and seismic activity.

== Recent tectonic activity ==
On December 26, 2004, a large portion of the boundary between the Burma plate and the Indian plate slipped, causing the 2004 Indian Ocean earthquake and tsunami. This megathrust earthquake had an estimated moment magnitude of 9.1–9.3 M_{w}. Over 1,600 kilometres (990 mi) of the boundary underwent thrust faulting and shifted up to 5 metres (16 ft) vertically and 11 metres (36 ft) horizontally. This rapid rise in the sea floor over such a short time (seven minutes) generated a massive tsunami that killed approximately 229,800 people along the coast of the Indian Ocean.
