= 2021 Assam earthquake =

Earthquake in India

- Location within Assam Location within India
- UTC time: 2021-04-28 02:21:26
- ISC event: 620343980
- USGS-ANSS: ComCat
- Local date: 28 April 2021
- Local time: 07:51 (IST)
- Magnitude: 6.0 M_{w}
- Depth: 34 km (21 mi)
- Epicenter: 26.781°N 92.457°E
- Fault: Kopili Fault
- Areas affected: Bangladesh, China, Myanmar, Bhutan, and India
- Max. intensity: MMI VI (Strong)
- Aftershocks: Several. The strongest so far is a M_{w} 4.7
- Casualties: 2 dead, 12 injured

The 2021 Assam earthquake struck 11 km (7 miles) away from Dhekiajuli, Assam, India at 07:51 (IST) on April 28, 2021 with a moment magnitude of 6.0 at 34.0 km (21.1 mi) depth. The quake struck with an epicenter 140 km (86 miles) north of the main city of Guwahati. It resulted in two fatalities and at least 12 injuries.

== Tectonic setting ==
The tectonics of the Assam region is dominated by convergence of the India, Burma and Eurasian plates. Major fault structures like the Main Frontal Thrust, Main Boundary Thrust and Main Central Thrust, all splay branches of the Main Himalayan Thrust, accommodate the shortening rate as India is pushing into Asia. The large 8.6 M_{w} Assam–Tibet earthquake in 1950 was a megathrust earthquake that resulted from a rupture along the Main Himalayan Thrust and Main Frontal Thrust.

== Earthquake ==
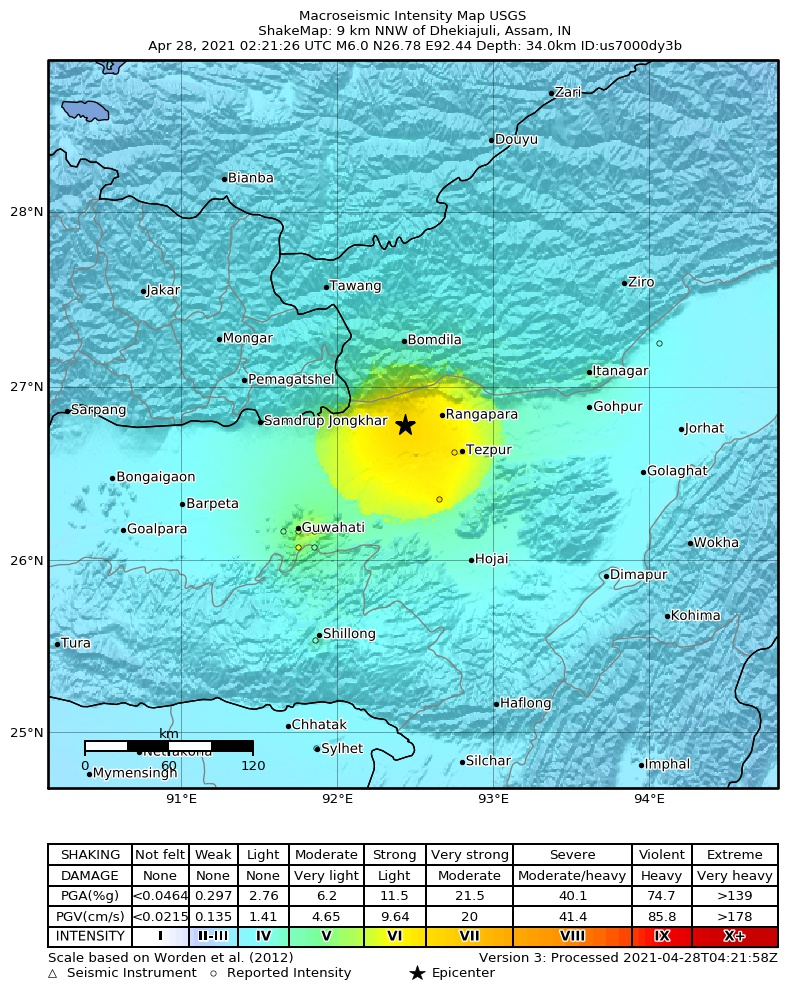
Earthquake Intensity Map

The earthquake occurred as a result of oblique-slip faulting at a shallow depth just at the foothills of the Himalayas. Analysis by India's National Centre for Seismology revealed that the earthquake involved slip along the Kopili Fault, near the Main Frontal Thrust. This is a northeast striking fault structure that runs from east of the Shillong Plateau, through the Assam Valley and into Bhutan for a total estimated length of 300 km, and a width of 30 km. Its predominant slip sense is right-lateral strike-slip.

The same fault is believed to have caused an M_{wb} 6.1 earthquake in Bhutan in 2009, killing 11 and injuring dozens. Two other M_{w} 7.0+ earthquakes rocked the Assam Valley in 1869 and 1943, is believed to have been on this fault, as well as the deadly 2016 Imphal earthquake on its southern termination.

== Impact ==
The earthquake caused moderate but widespread damage to nearby buildings, although no collapses were reported. It was assigned a maximum Modified Mercalli intensity of VI (Strong). Among the buildings affected was a multi-story structure in Nagaon which tilted to its side and leaned against an adjacent building. Cracks also appeared in the walls of homes and commercial buildings. A few vehicles were damaged when bricks fell on them. Landslides and liquefaction of the ground were reported in Assam. Damage to buildings were also reported in nearby Bhutan, and two individuals were injured. Two people in the Kamrup Metro and Nagaon districts died of heart attacks caused by the earthquake while 12 others suffered injuries.

== See also ==
- List of earthquakes in 2021
- List of earthquakes in India
