= 2016 Imphal earthquake =

Earthquake near India-Myanmar border

- Location within India
- UTC time: 2016-01-03 23:05:22
- ISC event: 612140990
- USGS-ANSS: ComCat
- Local date: 4 January 2016
- Local time: 4:35 a.m IST (UTC+5)
- Magnitude: 6.7 M_{w}
- Depth: 55.0 km (34.2 mi)
- Epicenter: 24.834°N 93.656°E
- Areas affected: Bangladesh; India; Myanmar; Nepal
- Total damage: $41.3 million (2016 USD)
- Max. intensity: MMI VII (Very strong)
- Casualties: 11 dead ~200 injured

The 2016 Imphal earthquake occurred on 4 January 2016 at 4:35 a.m. local time (23:05 UTC, 3 January) in Manipur, and had a magnitude of 6.7 Mw. The seismic wave radius travelled over 200 km and shaking was felt in numerous cities, including Imphal, Silchar and Guwahati. 13 people in India and Bangladesh were killed, and many buildings in the city of Imphal and surrounding areas were damaged.

== Earthquake ==
The Mw6.7 earthquake was caused by a strike slip fault in a plate boundary between the Indian and Eurasian plate along the Southern Asian region. The focal mechanism that resulted in the earthquake was the Indian plate colliding with the Eurasian plate at a speed of 48mm/yr. The depth of the epicenter of the earthquake was determined to be 55 km by the USGS. A subsequent Mw6.9 earthquake also occurred on 14 April 2016, 240 km southeast of epicenter of the Imphal earthquake, with a focal point depth of 134 km. Just like the Imphal earthquake, this later earthquake was caused by a reverse dextral fault. From this it can be deduced that there was an intraplate convergence where a slab subducted beneath another between the Indian and Eurasian plates that caused the Imphal quake.

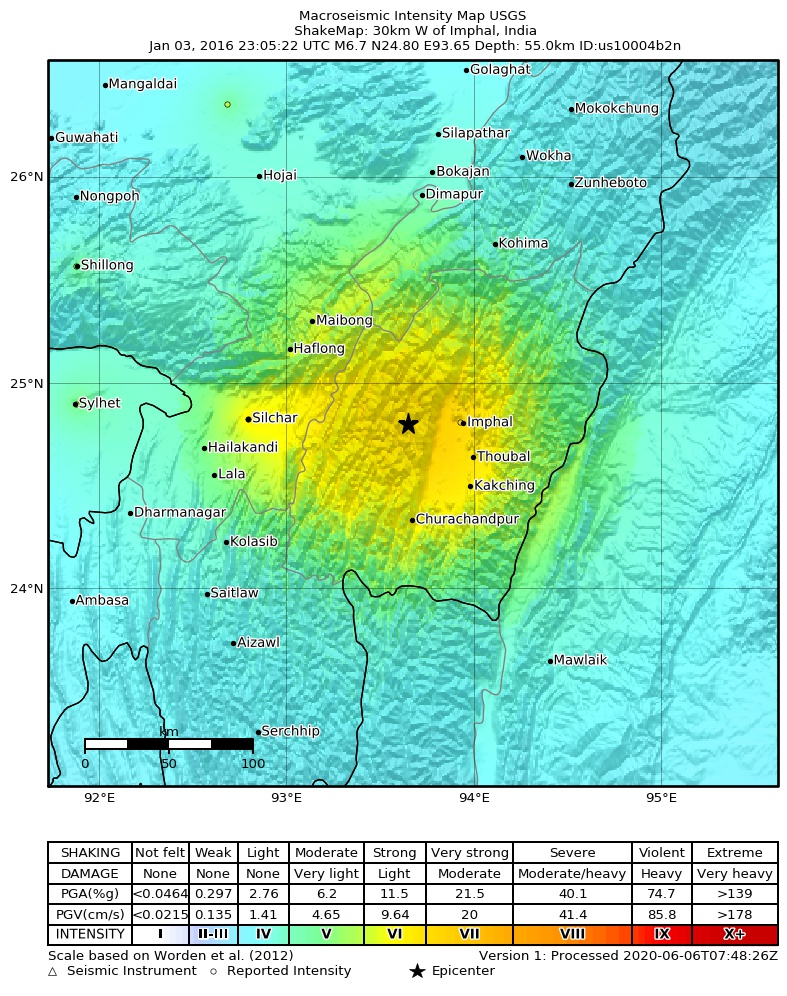
ShakeMap from USGS showing the intensity of the Imphal Earthquake

While the earthquake was a significant event, moderate-to-large earthquakes in this region have been fairly common in the past, although this was the largest earthquake to hit the state of Manipur since 1957. 20 earthquakes have occurred within 250 km of the 2016 event in the past 100 years. The largest was a 8.0 magnitude earthquake in 1946, 220 km to the southeast of the 2016 earthquake on the Sagaing Fault. Other significant events less than 200 km away from Imphal earthquake include a M 7.3 earthquake in August 1988, which caused several fatalities and dozens of injuries, and another M 6.0 earthquake in December 1984 that caused 20 fatalities and 100 injuries.

== Damage ==
Casualties by country
Country	Deaths	Injuries	Ref.
India	8	200	&
Bangladesh	5	200	&
Total	13	200	

Based on USGS data, the shake-map showed moderate shaking intensity around the region of Imphal. 13 people were killed, 8 in India and 5 in Bangladesh. Additionally, 200 others were injured and numerous buildings were damaged. In rural areas many buildings were damaged, walls of houses in areas like Kabuikhullen village appeared to be detached from the main frame, while some foundations shifted by 33 cm from their original position. In Imphal city the damage was restricted to buildings on the riverbank, such as the three women's markets, or on other marshy terrain, such as the Central Agricultural University. Additionally, a newly built 6 storey high-rise collapsed. The damage in Imphal is mostly attributable to poor, non-earthquake resistant construction. Additionally, some school buildings were damaged and power was initially knocked out in parts of the Senapati and Tamenglong districts. Total damage was about 2.75 billion rupee (US$41.3 million).

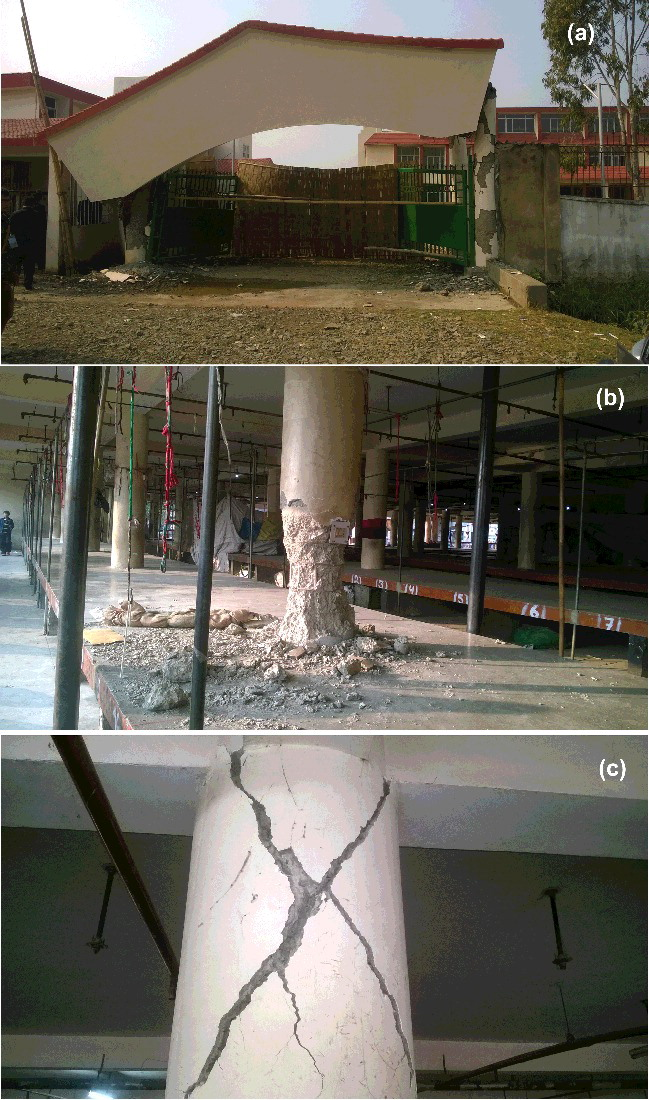
Damage caused at the Agricultural University and the Ima women's market

== Response ==
The National Disaster Response Force (NDRF) was deployed in Manipur, to clear off debris and locate possible survivors. Teams of experts were sent in to assess damaged buildings, and a medical team was dispatched to treat the wounded. Additionally, nonessential government offices were closed. Power supply was back up on 5 January 2016 4pm, just 36 hours after the earthquake struck.

However, government response efforts were critiqued for the immediate aftermath of the event, with some volunteer responders claiming that government teams were either absent or under-supplied. Prime Minister Narendra Modi tweeted that he was in contact with local authorities about the earthquake aftermath.

== Future implications ==
The earthquake damage was mainly a result of poorly constructed buildings built with reinforced concrete or masonry, which is reflected in the cracks and breakages of column joints in many structures. Many structures also experienced total collapse. This has been a recurring issue in the region, with similar building damage seen in the 6.4 magnitude Assam earthquake in 2021 and 5.7 magnitude Tripura earthquake in 2017, with similar effects and severity of damage as the Imphal quake. While both the 2017 Tripura earthquake and the 2021 Assam earthquake lead to slightly more than 10 injuries with 3 indirect deaths from the shock, building damage was significant. Thousands of buildings were damaged in both earthquakes and liquefaction occurred during the events. This resulted in almost 6 times increase in bank erosion during the Tripura earthquake.

The earthquake is also located along the Indo-Burma range (IBR) zone that experiences high seismicity. Data shows that 25 or more earthquake that are of 7 moment magnitude or greater have occurred in the past century. The area is also estimated to experience at least one 5.0 Magnitude earthquake annually, using past data and models. Some recent examples include the 5.6 magnitude 2020 Mizoram earthquake and the 5.4 magnitude earthquake at Mawlaik, Myanmar in 2024.

For the city of Imphal and the nearby areas, the National Disaster Management Authority of India (NERMP) and local governments are stepping up on mitigation projects to conduct seismic vulnerability assessment, improve infrastructure with more earthquake resistant buildings and increase general awareness to the public. Additionally, upgrading search and rescue capabilities, early warning and evacuation plans are also being developed to improve earthquake management in the area. These efforts are all part of the District Disaster Management Plan (DDMP).

== See also ==
- Indian plate
- List of earthquakes in 2016
- List of earthquakes in India
- Thrust tectonics
