= 1984 Cachar earthquake =

Earthquake in India

- Location within Assam Location within India
- UTC time: 1984-12-30 23:33:37
- ISC event: 537963
- USGS-ANSS: ComCat
- Local date: December 31, 1984
- Local time: 05:03:37 (IST)
- Magnitude: 5.6 mb 6.0 M_{w}
- Depth: 22.6 km (14.0 mi)
- Epicenter: 24.641°N 92.891°E
- Type: Oblique–reverse
- Areas affected: Assam, India
- Max. intensity: MMI VIII (Severe)
- Casualties: ~20 deaths ~100 injuries

The 1984 Cachar earthquake rattled much of Southern Assam on December 31, 1984, at 5:03 a.m. (UTC+5:30) with an epicenter 20 kilometers southwest of Lakhipur. The quake measured with a magnitude of 6.0 on the moment magnitude scale and an estimated intensity of VIII (Severe) on the Modified Mercalli intensity scale. About 20 people died and 100 others sustained mild to severe injuries.

== Geological setting ==
Cachar lies on the Shillong Plateau, in the northeast region of India. It is one of the most seismically active regions in the world, due to its being located between the boundary of the Indian Plate and the Eurasian Plate, thus creating the Himalayan arc. The continental Indian Plate collides with the Burma Plate (part of the Eurasian Plate) at an oblique angle. The continental collision zone is seismically active with the potential to generate large earthquakes.

The events following this earthquake (1984) are said to be the beginning of a re-activation of seismic activity in the area,. The area has been predicted to be home to another large earthquake with a magnitude of ≥6 in the near future. Cachar has also been hit by a much larger earthquake in the past with a magnitude of 7.4 in the same area in 1869.

== Earthquake ==
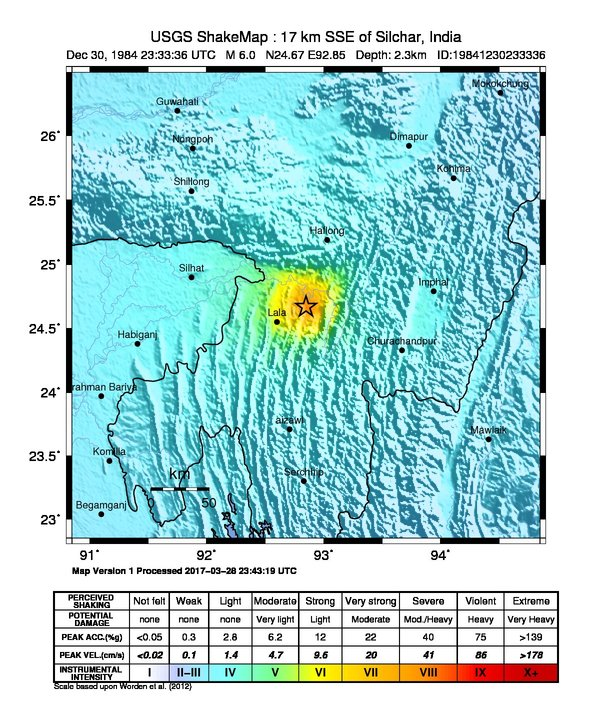
A USGS Shakemap of the 1984 Cachar earthquake

The earthquake happened in the early morning of December 31, 1984 local date or the last day of the year. There are two recorded magnitudes for this event, one being 6.0 on the moment magnitude scale and the other is a 5.6 on the body-wave magnitude scale. It was assigned a maximum intensity of VIII (Severe) on the Mercalli intensity scale. According to isoseismal maps. intensity VIII was felt in a narrow area near the epicenter. Isoseismal maps with intensity contours in the area also suggest the depth of focus is shallower than initially finalized; at 10 kilometers or less.

The tremor triggered numerous surface fissures on flat grounds spewing sand and water out of it. Multiple ground failures and liquefaction were observed, which was considered unusual due to it being too moderate in size to generate an effect similar to this normally seen in larger earthquakes. However, it was later realized that the region is filled with loose soil and a main component of liquefaction which is the flat land in the region being filled with sedimentary rock. The focal mechanism of the earthquake is a combination of a thrust and a strike-slip.

== Damage and casualties ==
Damage was concentrated in a meizoseismal area of 250 km^{2}. Places with weak infrastructural management, most notably homes made out of soft mud, clay and bricks were a contributing factor to the deaths reported. Two children died after their home collapsed. Many injured were sent to a medical college in nearby Silchar. An embankment in the Sonai river collapsed, flooding multiple villages and towns, and causing many to lose their homes. Multiple bridges also suffered considerable damage. In total, 20 people died about a hundred others sustaining injuries and over 10,000 were reported homeless. The earthquake is considered one of the deadliest in northeastern India since the 1950 Assam–Tibet earthquake.

== See also ==
- List of earthquakes in India
- Lists of 20th-century earthquakes
