= 1993 Latur earthquake =

Earthquake centered in Maharashtra State, India

- Location within Maharashtra Location within India
- UTC time: 1993-09-29 22:25:48
- ISC event: 210578
- USGS-ANSS: ComCat
- Local date: 30 September 1993
- Local time: 03:56
- Magnitude: 6.2 M_{w} 6.3 M_{s}
- Depth: 10 km (6.2 mi)
- Epicenter: 18.07°N 76.62°E
- Type: Reverse
- Areas affected: India
- Total damage: $280 million–1.3 billion
- Max. intensity: MMI VIII (Severe) MSK-64 VIII (Damaging)
- Casualties: 9,748 dead 30,000 injured 1,000,000 displaced

The 1993 Latur earthquake struck India at 3:56 am local time (UTC+05:30) on 30 September. The main area affected were the districts of Latur and Dharashiv, including the Ausa block of Latur and Omerga of Dharashiv in Maharashtra, Western India. Fifty-two villages were demolished in the intraplate earthquake. It measured 6.2 on the moment magnitude scale, and approximately 10,000 people died, whilst another 30,000 were injured. The earthquake's hypocenter was around 10 km deep – relatively shallow – allowing shock waves to cause more damage. It is considered the deadliest earthquake in the stable continental crust to have occurred in recorded history.

Because the location does not lie on a plate boundary, there was some debate as to what caused the earthquake. The Indian sub-continent crumples as it pushes against Asia and pressure is released. It is possible that this pressure is released along fault lines. Another argument is that reservoir construction along the Terna was responsible for increasing pressure on fault lines. Killari, where the epicenter of the quake is believed to have been, had a large crater, which remains in place to date.

== Background and geology ==
The Latur area, and indeed peninsular India where it is located, was previously considered having the least possibility of seismic activity. Prior to 1967 there had been only three recorded notable earthquakes in peninsular India. The Koyna earthquake, a few hundred miles west of Latur in 1967 was the most recent one. Latur area is near the eastern end of Deccan Traps formed by flood basalt. The basalt flows in the area are estimated to be 450 meters thick with the terrain generally flat.

== Impact ==
The earthquake struck at 03:56 AM local time, when many residents were still celebrating a religious holiday. In Latur District, 817 of its 936 villages were affected; 374 villages were damaged in Dharashiv District. Fifty-two villages were levelled. Estimates of the death toll range from 7,582 to over 11,000. In Killari, more than 1,200 people died and at least 2,847 homes were razed. Within the epicenter area, nearly all livestock were destroyed. The scale of death and destruction was considered disproportionately large for the moderate earthquake magnitude. Poor construction methods and rainy weather which preceded the earthquake contributed to the destruction.

== Relief efforts ==
Several foreign and local donors reacted immediately to the tragedy by sending relief teams and rescue workers. Physicians and staff from Railway Hospital, Solapur and V.M. Medical College, Solapur were amongst the first to reach the site and assisted with treatment of the injured over the next several weeks. The first convoy of over 120 trucks laden with relief material such as tents, blankets, food and clothing, medical supplies and temporary shelters given by international donors departed from Mumbai at around 10am on 2 October 1993. 42nd battalion of MIL, The Indian Army, State Reserve Police Force, Central Reserve Police Force and other law enforcement agencies and volunteer organizations like Rashtriya Swayamsevak Sangh (RSS) rushed their personnel almost immediately after the quake, assuming there would be a greater number of casualties.

== See also ==
- List of earthquakes in 1993
- List of earthquakes in India
- Geology of Maharashtra
- Nanded earthquakes
