= 1993 Finisterre earthquakes =

Earthquakes in Eastern Papua New Guinea

- Location within Papua New Guinea
- UTC time: 1993-10-13 02:06:00
- ISC event: 202346
- USGS-ANSS: ComCat
- Local date: 13 and 25 October 1993
- Local time: 12:06 PGT, 20:27 PGT
- Magnitude: M_{w} 6.9, M_{w} 6.7
- Depth: 21.4 km (13.3 mi), 21.0 km (13.0 mi)
- Epicenter: 5.889°S 146.020°E
- Type: Thrust
- Areas affected: Markham Valley, Papua New Guinea
- Max. intensity: MMI IX (Violent)
- Landslides: 4,700
- Casualties: 60–65 dead, 200 injured

Six magnitude 6.0 or larger earthquakes struck the Markham Valley region of Madang and Morobe provinces in Papua New Guinea of October 1993. The first and largest of the sequence measured M_{w} 6.9 and struck on 13 October; a M_{w} 6.7 shock occurred 12 days later. These earthquakes were centered beneath the Finisterre Range, north of the valley. They were caused by thrust faulting on the Ramu–Markham Fault, a major plate boundary between the Finisterre Terrane and Australian plate. At least 60 people were killed; many because of landslides and mudflows that destroyed villages downhill of the range.

== Tectonic setting ==
Papua New Guinea lies along a seismically active and fast-moving convergent plate boundary between the Australian and Pacific plates where the convergent rate is 10–11 cm (3.9–4.3 in) per year. The boundary is rather complex due to interactions with the Bismarck and Solomon Sea plates sandwiched between. The Solomon Sea plate subducts in particular, may be exhibiting double subduction along; northward along the Finisterre Terrane and New Britain Trench, and southward north of the Papuan Peninsula.

The Ramu–Markham Fault is a major thrust fault representing a plate boundary and suture zone between the Finisterre Terrane and Australian plate. This fault has an average dip of 30–40° to the north, and extends to a depth of 90 km (56 mi) beneath the Finisterre Range. The terrane comprise rocks of the Paleogene to early Neogene volcanic arc, and is overlain by Miocene to Plio-Pleistocene limestones. The Finisterre Terrane accreted onto mainland Papua New Guinea about 3 to 3.7 million years ago, thrusting the block to form the Finisterre Range. The range has a maximum elevation of 4,000 m (13,000 ft). Bedrock landsliding is frequent within the range, caused by rainfall and earthquakes on thrust faults. Historical earthquakes near the mountains date back to 1876; locals have described strong shaking in the region.

== Earthquakes ==
The earthquake sequence comprised six events of moment magnitude 6.0 to 6.9 with epicenters in the Finisterre Range. The first and largest occurred at 12:06 PGT on 13 October, measuring M_{w} 6.9. Its epicenter was 47 km (29 mi) north–northeast of Kainantu, and occurred at a depth of 21.4 km (13.3 mi). The second largest event occurred southwest of the first, on 25 October at 20:27 PGT. It measured M_{w} 6.7 and occurred at a depth of 21.0 km (13.0 mi).

These thrust-faulting events were the largest ever recorded around the Ramu–Markham Fault zone. Due to their close proximity, are considered a doublet earthquake. The causative fault was a north-dipping structure with the Finisterre Range representing the up-thrusted hanging wall.

Research into the source of these earthquakes are contradictory. Geoffrey A. Abers and Robert McCaffrey inferred that these earthquakes occurred on a fault lying underneath the down-dip extension of the Ramu–Markham Fault zone as their depth implies. They suspected that this fault reaches the surface about 100 km (62 mi) south of the surface trace of the Ramu–Markham Fault. G. Pegler and others contended that these earthquakes occurred on the Ramu–Markham Fault. Within the first several kilometers, the dip angle is steep, before flattening out at a depth of 20 km (12 mi) or less.

According to GPS data, these earthquakes caused horizontal surface deformation of up to 20 cm (7.9 in) across the 5 km (3.1 mi) wide valley. It led to inference that the Ramu–Markham Fault has a steep ramp-geometry near the surface but flattens out to a horizontal detachment at mid-crustal depth. Though most of the earthquakes in the sequence ruptured the detachment at 20–25 km (12–16 mi) depth, slip must have also occurred on the ramp and extend several hundred meters short of the surface to cause deformation. Seismic waveform modelling suggest that the two largest events likely accounted for the deformation.

== Impact ==
Modified Mercalli intensities in selected locations
MMI	Locations
MMI IX (Violent)	Getapa, Maraboi, Mataya
MMI VIII (Severe)	Lakuan, Qasam, Damaganum, Numbugu
MMI VII (Very strong)	Umsis, Gabensis, Zawan, Watut, Insi, Ramu Sugar, Aiyura, Atsunas, Ragitsumang, Wantoat, Yonki

About 60 to 65 people were killed and 200 were injured. These earthquakes triggered an estimated 4,700 landslides with a combined surface area of 55 km^{2} (21 sq mi). They caused most of the casualties, and were reported on the border of Morobe and Madang provinces, with some 2,000–2,500 ft (610–760 m) long and a half-mile wide. When they blocked channels such as the Ume River, earthquake-dammed lakes formed.

An initial report by the Associated Press stated 40 deaths while a local official said as many as 160 people were dead or missing after mudslides from the mountains flowed into the villages downhill. These mudslides buried villages and their residents, destroying more than 600 people's homes.

More than 1,100 homes were destroyed, 24 schools closed, and electrical services were disrupted immediately following the earthquake shaking. The United Nations Department of Humanitarian Affairs said many family gardens were destroyed, threatening local food resources and worsening a humanitarian crisis started by an earlier drought. The Papua New Guinea government said that about 60,000 people were affected and thousands were displaced. Many were relocated to shelters including about 9,600 people from the upper Markham Valley. Thousands who lived in the mountainous region were also evacuated due to the threat of further landslides and dammed lakes along blocked streams.

Aid was largely delivered by air transport because landslides destroyed most land routes. Seven commercial aircraft were also involved in deliveries. The government activated its National Disaster and Emergency Services for aerial and damage assessments, set aside K450,000 for emergency relief activities, and created a trust fund for donations. Some relief organisations and state government supported the relief work. The Australian government contributed supplies, US$57,000 in cash, and dispatched a Lockheed C-130 Hercules aircraft. The British and Japanese governments, and Caritas Germany, provided cash, supplies, or both. Education programs for the mountain residents helped raise awareness about the threat of landslides and dammed lakes.

== See also ==
- List of earthquakes in 1993
- List of earthquakes in Papua New Guinea
