= 1950 Calama earthquake =

Earthquake in Chile

- Location within South America
- UTC time: 1950-12-09 21:38:51
- ISC event: 896170
- USGS-ANSS: ComCat
- Local date: December 9, 1950
- Local time: 18:38:51 (UTC-3)
- Magnitude: M_{w} 8.2
- Depth: 113.9 km (70.8 mi)
- Epicenter: 23.977°S 67.912°W
- Type: Normal
- Areas affected: Chile
- Max. intensity: MMI VII (Very strong)
- Casualties: 1 dead, "several" injured

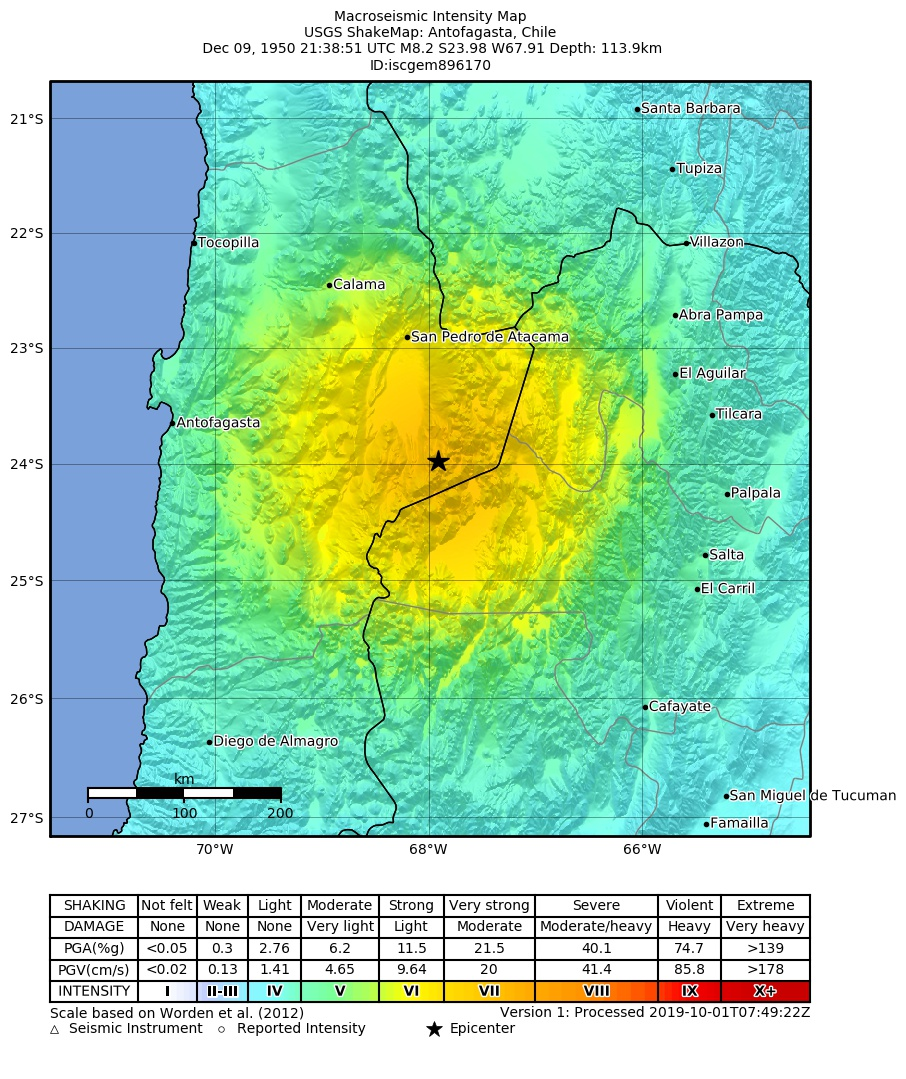
Macroseismic Intensity Map of the 1950 Calama earthquake

The 1950 Calama earthquake occurred near the Argentina–Chile border with an epicenter near Calama, Chile in the Atacama Desert on December 9. The event had a hypocenter depth of 113.9 km, beneath the Caichinque volcanic complex. It measured magnitude M_{w} 8.2 on the moment magnitude scale, making it the largest intermediate-depth earthquake ever recorded on Chilean soil. One person was killed and an unspecified number of people were injured in Calama.

== Tectonic setting ==
Earthquakes are frequent in Chile as it lies in the so-called Pacific Ring of Fire, where many of the world's active volcanoes and seismic activities are concentrated at. Off the coast of Chile, the Nazca Plate subducts beneath the South American Plate along the Peru–Chile or Atacama Megathrust, producing large earthquakes including the 1960 Chilean earthquake which had a magnitude of 9.5–9.6 on the moment magnitude scale.

In some cases, intraslab earthquakes occur. These earthquakes do not occur on the subduction interface; rather they happen as a result of faulting within the downgoing Nazca Plate. Intraslab earthquakes can occur anywhere within the slab, which may be deeper than 600 km.

== Earthquake ==
The quake was an intermediate-depth event which ruptured within the Nazca Plate. There, the plate dips at an angle of 20°–30° to the east, beneath the South American Plate. This was the result of extensional stress acting on the Nazca Plate at an intermediate depth. Based on its large seismic magnitude, the rupture area is estimated to be 6,000 km^{2}, breaking through the thickness of the Nazca Plate along a vertically dipping normal fault.

== See also ==
- List of earthquakes in 1950
- List of earthquakes in Chile
- List of earthquakes in Argentina
