= National Centre for Seismology =

The National Centre for Seismology (NCS) is an office of India's Ministry of Earth Sciences. The office monitors earthquakes and conducts seismological research. Specifically, it provides earthquake surveillance and hazard reports to governmental agencies. It consists of various divisions:

- Earthquake Monitoring & Services
- Earthquake Hazard & Risk Assessments
- Geophysical Observation Systems

The Seismology Division and Earthquake Risk Evaluation Centre of the India Meteorological Department merged with NCS in August 2014 to more effectively monitor and research seismological activity. The Centre's objective is to improve understanding of earthquake processes and their effects through seismological research and monitoring.

In July 2017, NCS released a mobile app, "IndiaQuake", that disseminates realtime earthquake information.

== Earthquake monitoring in India ==
Earthquakes in Indian subcontinent occur due to the north-eastward movement of the Indian Plate and its interaction with the neighboring Eurasian Plate in the north. Most of earthquakes occur in the plate boundary regions; however, a few damaging earthquakes have occurred in the plate interior regions as well. A few damaging earthquakes in the plate-boundary regions include the following: 1897 Shillong plateau, 1905 Kangra, 1934 Nepal-Bihar, 1950 Chayu-Upper Assam, 2004 Sumatra-Andaman, 2005 Kashmir and 2015 Gorkha earthquakes. In the plate interior regions, damaging earthquakes occurred in 1993 at Killari, Maharashtra, in 1997 at Jabalpur, Madhya Pradesh, and in 2001 in Kachchh, Gujarat.

Earthquake monitoring in India started as early as 1898, with the establishment of an earthquake observatory at Alipore, Kolkata (Calcutta). This followed the great Shillong Plateau earthquake in 1897. After independence, the number of observatories increased to 15, and after the worldwide seismograph station network in 1964, the number increased to 45. After the 1993 Killari earthquake, the arrival of digital instrumentation allowed NCS to develop observatories across India. There are currently 84 such observatories. Dense networks of observatories are present in the N.E. India and Delhi region because this area has been given special priority.

A dedicated Real Time Seismic Monitoring Network provides continuous data to the Tsunami Warning Centre at NCS. All observatories are equipped with a SAT communication facility for the transfer of data in realtime to the Operational Centre. Continuous seismic data of seismological observatories at Mimic, Port Blair and Shilling are shared globally. With the current network, earthquakes of a magnitude of 3.5 can be located within five to ten minutes with reliable accuracy. The information on earthquake guidelines are disseminated to all concerned state and central government departments through a short message service (SMS), fax, or e-mail. IndiaQuake is an application developed to provide this information to citizens in real time.

== Seismic Microzonation ==
A priority of NCS is to provide seismic microzonation of major urban areas in India lying in seismic hazard zones. This exercise has been initiated for 30 cities in India, including Delhi.

== Seismological Research ==
NCS is actively involved in seismological research related to estimating shallow and deep crustal structures in various tectonic domains of the India land mass. This research provides insight into earthquake occurrence processes in the Himalayas, the Burma plate, and the Sumatra trench, as well as crustal deformation measurements in the plate-boundary and plate-interior regions.

== IndiaQuake ==
IndiaQuake was a mobile app that provided realtime information about the parameters of earthquakes occurring in India. These parameters included location, time, and magnitude.It was last updated on 01/01/2018

== See also ==
- Institute of Seismological Research
