= Earthquake zones of India =

The Indian subcontinent has a history of devastating earthquakes. The major reason for the high frequency and intensity of the earthquakes is that the Indian plate is driving into Asia at a rate of approximately 47 mm/year. As per statistics published by Ministry of Earth Sciences of Government of India, almost 59% of land mass of India is vulnerable to earthquakes. A World Bank and United Nations report shows estimates that around 200 million city dwellers in India will be exposed to storms and earthquakes by 2050. The latest version of seismic zoning map of India given in the earthquake resistant design code of India [IS 1893 (Part 1) 2002] assigns four levels of seismicity for India in terms of zone factors. In other words, the earthquake zoning map of India divides India into 4 seismic zones (Zone 2, 3, 4 and 5) unlike its previous version, which consisted of five or six zones for the country. According to the present zoning map, Zone 5 expects the highest level of seismicity whereas Zone 2 is associated with the lowest level of seismicity.

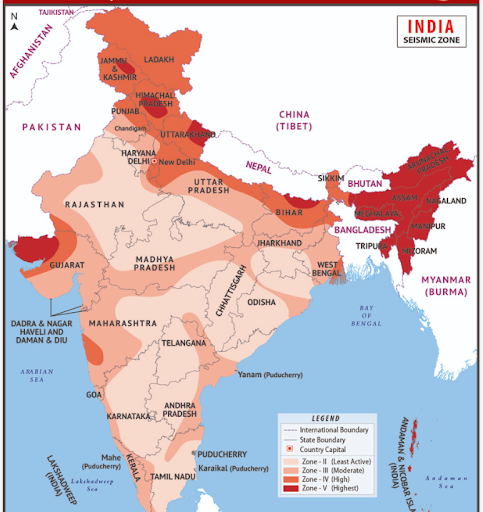
Revised earthquake hazard zone map of India

== National Center for Seismology ==
The National Center for Seismology Ministry of Earth Sciences is a nodal agency of the Government of India dealing with various activities in the fields of seismology and allied disciplines. The major activities currently being pursued by the National Center for Seismology include a) earthquake monitoring on a 24/7 basis, including real time seismic monitoring for early warning of tsunamis, b) operation and maintenance of national seismological network and local networks, c) seismological data centre and information services, d) seismic hazard and risk related studies, e) field studies for aftershock/swarm monitoring and site response studies and f) earthquake processes and modelling.

The MSK (Medvedev-Sponheuer-Karnik) intensity broadly associated with the various seismic zones is VI (or less), VII, VIII and IX (and above) for Zones 2, 3, 4 and 5, respectively, corresponding to Maximum Considered Earthquake (MCE). The IS code follows a dual design philosophy: (a) under low probability or extreme earthquake events (MCE) the structure damage should not result in total collapse, and (b) under more frequently occurring earthquake events, the structure should suffer only minor or moderate structural damage. The specifications given in the design code (IS 1893: 2002) are not based on detailed assessment of maximum ground acceleration in each zone using a deterministic or probabilistic approach. Instead, each zone factor represents the effective period peak ground accelerations that may be generated during the maximum considered earthquake ground motion in that zone.

Each zone indicates the effects of an earthquake at a particular place based on the observations of the affected areas and can also be described using a descriptive scale like the Modified Mercalli intensity scale or the Medvedev–Sponheuer–Karnik scale.

== Zone 5 ==
Zone 5 covers the areas with the highest risk of suffering earthquakes of intensity MSK IX or more significantly. The IS code assigns a zone factor of 0.36 for Zone 5. Structural designers use this factor for the earthquake-resistant design of structures in Zone 5. The zone factor of 0.36 (the maximum horizontal acceleration that a structure can experience) is indicative of effective (zero period) level earthquakes in this zone. It is referred to as the Very High Damage Risk Zone. The regions of Kashmir Valley, the Western and Garhwal Himalayas, North Bihar, the North-East India, the Rann of Kutch and the Andaman and Nicobar group of islands fall in this zone. Generally, the areas having trap rock or basaltic rock are prone to earthquakes.

== Zone 4 ==
This zone is called the High Damage Risk Zone and covers areas liable to MSK VIII. The IS code assigns a zone factor of 0.24 for Zone 4. Jammu and Kashmir, Ladakh, Himachal Pradesh, Uttarakhand, Sikkim, parts of the Indo-Gangetic plains (North Punjab, Chandigarh, Western Uttar Pradesh, Terai, a major portion of Bihar, North Bengal, the Sundarbans) and the capital of the country Delhi fall in Zone 4. In Maharashtra, the Patan area (Koynanagar) is also in Zone 4.

== Zone 3 ==
This zone is classified as a Moderate Damage Risk Zone which is liable to MSK VII. The IS code assigns a zone factor of 0.16 for Zone 3. Several megacities like Chennai, Mumbai, Pune, Kolkata, Bhubaneswar, Jamshedpur, Ahmedabad, Surat, Lucknow, Vadodara, Mangalore, Vijayawada, Coimbatore and the entire state of Kerala lie in this zone.

== Zone 2 ==
This region is liable to MSK VI or lower and is classified as the Low Damage Risk Zone. The IS code assigns a zone factor of 0.10 for Zone 2. It is the zone with low chances of having earthquakes. Cities like Bangalore, Hyderabad, Visakhapatnam, Nagpur, Raipur, Gwalior, Jaipur, Tiruchirappalli and Madurai are in this zone.

== Zone 1 ==
Since the current division of India into earthquake hazard zones does not use Zone 1, no area of India is classified as Zone 1. But it is said that some areas considered safe are from stable landmass covered under the deccan plateau, those considered as zone 1.

== See also ==
- List of earthquakes in India
- Geology of India
- Administrative divisions of India
- Cultural Zones of India, 7 in India
- Ecoregions in India, 46 in India
- Special economic zones in India
- Zonal Councils of India, 5 administrative zones in India
