= List of earthquakes in 1993 =

Earthquakes in 1993
Approximate epicenters of the earthquakes in 1993
- 4.0–5.9 magnitude
- 6.0–6.9 magnitude
- 7.0–7.9 magnitude
- 8.0+ magnitude
- Strongest magnitude: 7.8 M_{w} Guam
- Deadliest: 6.3 M_{w} (India) India; 9,748 deaths
- Total fatalities: 10,097

Number by magnitude
- 9.0+: 0

This is a list of earthquakes in 1993. Only earthquakes of magnitude 6 or above are included, unless they result in damage or casualties, or are notable for some other reason. All dates are listed according to UTC time.

== By death toll ==
Rank	Death toll	Magnitude	Location	MMI	Depth (km)	Date
1	9,748	6.3	India, Maharashtra	VIII (Severe)	10.0	September 30
2	230	7.7	Japan, Sea of Japan	VIII (Severe)	16.7	July 12
3	60	6.9	Papua New Guinea, Morobe	IX (Violent)	25.3	October 13

== By magnitude ==
Rank	Magnitude	Death toll	Location	MMI	Depth (km)	Date
1	7.8	0	Guam offshore	IX (Violent)	59.0	August 8
2	7.7	230	Japan, Hokkaido offshore	VIII (Severe)	16.7	July 12
3	7.6	2	Japan, Hokkaido	IX (Violent)	102.2	January 15
4	7.5	0	Russia, Kamchatka offshore	VII (Very strong)	70.6	June 8
5	7.2	1	Mexico, Chiapas offshore	VII (Very strong)	34.1	September 10
6	7.1	0	Solomon Islands, Temotu offshore	III (Weak)	20.4	March 6
7	7.0	0	Philippines, Mindanao offshore	VI (Strong)	58.7	May 11
7	7.0	0	Argentina, Jujuy	V (Moderate)	221.0	May 24
7	7.0	0	Afghanistan, Badakhshan	IV (Light)	214.5	August 9
7	7.0	0	New Zealand, Fiordland	VI (Strong)	28.1	August 10
7	7.0	0	Russia, Kamchatka offshore	VI (Strong)	34.0	November 13
7	7.0	0	Vanuatu, Tafea	VII (Very strong)	33.0	December 29

== By month ==
=== January ===
January
- Strongest magnitude: 7.6 M_{w} Japan
- Deadliest: 2.7 M_{w} South Africa; 6 deaths
- Total fatalities: 11

Number by magnitude
- 8.0–8.9: 0
- 7.0–7.9: 1
- 6.0–6.9: 8

Date	Country and location	M_{w}	Depth (km)	MMI	Notes	Casualties	
Date	Country and location	M_{w}	Depth (km)	MMI	Notes	Dead	Injured
5	Sweden, Västerbotten	4.2	33.0	V	Slight damage was caused in the central part of the county.	-	-
6	Iran, Fars	5.4	23.6	VI	Severe damage occurred in Firuzabad and Dadenjan.	-	-
8	South Africa, Free State	2.7	5.0	-	Six people were killed and seven others were injured in a mine near Welkom.	6	7
9	Yemen, Al Jawf	4.5	10.0	V	Some damage occurred in Sadah.	-	-
13	Jamaica, Saint Thomas	5.5	16.0	VII	One person died and damage occurred in Kingston.	1	-
15	Japan, Hokkaido	6.1	112.3	V	It is a foreshock of the 7.6 quake a few seconds later.	-	-
15	Japan, Hokkaido	7.6	102.2	IX	1993 Kushiro earthquake: 2 people were killed, 966 were injured and extensive damage was caused.	2	966
16	United States, California	4.9	7.2	VI	Minor damage occurred in Gilroy.	-	-
18	Northern Mariana Islands offshore	6.4	151.1	IV	-	-	-
19	Sea of Japan	6.6	448.3	I	-	-	-
20	Indonesia, Aceh	6.2	67.8	VI	-	-	-
23	Iran, Ilam	4.7	33.0	IV	Minor damage occurred to houses in Abdanan and Dehloran.	-	-
26	China, Yunnan	5.6	33.0	V	At least 66 people were injured, 6,972 houses collapsed and 21,444 others were damaged in southwestern Yunnan Province.	-	66
27	Iran, South Khorasan	5.1	33.0	IV	Three people were injured and 200 houses were severely damaged in Nehbandan.	-	3
31	China, Yunnan	4.9	33.0	IV	Two people were killed and slight damage to houses occurred in Dayao County.	2	-

=== February ===
February
- Strongest magnitude: 6.6 M_{w} Japan
- Total fatalities: 0

Number by magnitude
- 8.0–8.9: 0
- 7.0–7.9: 0
- 6.0–6.9: 3

Date	Country and location	M_{w}	Depth (km)	MMI	Notes	Casualties	
Date	Country and location	M_{w}	Depth (km)	MMI	Notes	Dead	Injured
2	China, Xinjiang	5.7	33.1	VI	Some damage occurred in Hejing County.	-	-
7	Japan, Ishikawa	6.6	10.6	VI	16 people were injured and some damage occurred in Ishikawa, Toyama, and Niigata prefectures. Landslides occurred in Suzu.	-	16
13	Ethiopia, Oromia	5.3	12.4	V	Several people were injured and damage occurred in Nazret.	-	Several
13	(France) Wallis and Futuna offshore	6.2	33.0	I	-	-	-
18	Central Mid-Atlantic Ridge	6.3	10.0	I	-	-	-

=== March ===
March
- Strongest magnitude: 7.1 M_{w} Solomon Islands
- Deadliest: 6.4 M_{w} (France) Wallis and Futuna; 5 deaths
- Total fatalities: 7

Number by magnitude
- 8.0–8.9: 0
- 7.0–7.9: 1
- 6.0–6.9: 15

Date	Country and location	M_{w}	Depth (km)	MMI	Notes	Casualties	
Date	Country and location	M_{w}	Depth (km)	MMI	Notes	Dead	Injured
1	Indonesia, Papua	6.2	88.8	V	-	-	-
5	Greece, Peloponnese offshore	5.2	38.8	IV	Minor damage occurred in Kalamata, Messini, and Methoni.	-	-
6	Solomon Islands, Santa Cruz Islands offshore	7.1	20.4	III	-	-	-
6	Tonga offshore, south of the Fiji Islands	6.6	18.2	I	-	-	-
7	South Georgia and the South Sandwich Islands offshore	6.3	33.0	I	This is a foreshock of the 6.5 quake five hours later.	-	-
7	South Georgia and the South Sandwich Islands offshore	6.5	33.0	I	–	-	-
12	(France) Futuna offshore	6.4	9.6	VII	Five people were killed, 20 were seriously injured, and damage occurred in Futuna.	5	20
15	Chile, Atacama offshore	6.7	28.9	VI	Some damage occurred in Chañaral, Copiapó and Taltal.	-	-
20	South Georgia and the South Sandwich Islands offshore	6.3	115.9	I	-	-	-
20	China, Tibet	6.2	12.2	VII	At least two people were killed, three others were seriously injured and damage was reported in Ngamring County.	2	3
21	Fiji, Eastern offshore	6.3	588.9	I	-	-	-
25	Japan, Hokkaido offshore	6.0	33.9	V	-	-	-
25	United States, Oregon	5.6	19.6	VII	1993 Scotts Mills earthquake: Six people were injured and many structures were damaged throughout the state, especially in Portland. It was the largest earthquake to hit the area since 1981.	-	6
26	Greece, West Greece	5.4	10.0	VII	Two people were injured and damage in Pirgos and Amalias.	-	2
26	Iran, Kohgiluyeh and Buyer Ahmad	5.1	29.6	IV	Considerable damage was caused.	-	-
29	Iran, Fars	5.2	26.6	VI	Some damage occurred in Khonj.	-	-
31	United States, Nebraska	2.9	5.0	V	Minor damage at Peru State College in Peru, Nebraska.	-	-

=== April ===
April
- Strongest magnitude: 6.9 M_{w} Fiji
- Deadliest: 6.3 M_{w} Peru; 6 deaths
- Total fatalities: 6

Number by magnitude
- 8.0–8.9: 0
- 7.0–7.9: 0
- 6.0–6.9: 9

Date	Country and location	M_{w}	Depth (km)	MMI	Notes	Casualties	
Date	Country and location	M_{w}	Depth (km)	MMI	Notes	Dead	Injured
5	South Georgia and the South Sandwich Islands offshore	6.3	33.0	I	-	-	-
8	Iran, Ardabil	4.7	10.0	V	Several people were injured in Sarab and Ardabil.	-	Several
9	United States, Texas	4.1	5.0	V	Slight damage occurred in Campbellton and Fashing.	-	-
16	Fiji, Eastern offshore	6.9	565.1	I	-	-	-
18	Peru, Lima	6.3	106.3	VI	Six people were killed (three of them due to landslides), and 30 houses were destroyed in Lima.	6	-
18	Pacific-Antarctic Ridge	6.3	10.0	I	-	-	-
19	Guatemala, Jutiapa	4.4	33.0	IV	50 houses were slightly damaged in Santa Rosa Department.	-	-
19	Indonesia, Halmahera offshore	6.8	23.6	I	-	-	-
24	Fiji, Eastern offshore	6.3	599.3	I	-	-	-
25	United States, Arizona	5.0	10.0	V	Some minor damage at Tusayan, Valle and Pipe Spring National Monument. It is a foreshock of the 5.3 quake four days later.	-	-
29	United States, Arizona	5.3	10.0	V	Additional damage occurred to buildings previously damaged by the 5.0 quake in the Pipe Spring National Monument and some damage occurred in Big Water, Utah and Flagstaff. Power outages occurred in Grand Canyon Village, Tusayan and Valle.	-	-

=== May ===
May
- Strongest magnitude: 7.0 M_{w} Philippines; 7.0 M_{w} Argentina
- Deadliest: 3.8 M_{w} South Africa; 7 deaths
- Total fatalities: 7

Number by magnitude
- 8.0–8.9: 0
- 7.0–7.9: 2
- 6.0–6.9: 14

Date	Country and location	M_{w}	Depth (km)	MMI	Notes	Casualties	
Date	Country and location	M_{w}	Depth (km)	MMI	Notes	Dead	Injured
2	South Georgia and the South Sandwich Islands offshore	6.4	12.9	I	-	-	-
6	Brazil, Acre	6.1	572.8	I	-	-	-
9	Iran, Razavi Khorasan	4.9	10.0	VI	Several houses were damaged at Torbat-e Heydarieh.	-	-
10	United States, Pennsylvania	2.8	5.0	IV	One person was injured in Reading after he lost his balance during the quake and fell off his bicycle. This is believed to be one of the smallest earthquakes in the United States for which confirmed casualty reports have been received.	-	1
11	Philippines, Mindanao	7.0	58.7	VI	-	-	-
13	United States, Alaska offshore	6.9	32.3	VI	Items were knocked off shelves in Sand Point and King Cove.	-	-
14	South Africa, North West	3.8	5.0	-	The earthquake may have been a mine explosion which killed seven people.	7	-
15	Mexico, Guerrero	6.0	19.7	VI	This earthquake, together with the 6.1 event three minutes later, can be considered a doublet earthquake.	-	-
15	Mexico, Guerrero	6.1	20.8	VI	Some damage occurred in Mexico City.	-	-
15	United States, Alaska offshore, Andreanof Islands	6.9	32.0	V	-	-	-
16	Tonga offshore	6.6	21.3	I	-	-	-
17	Papua New Guinea, East New Britain	6.4	17.3	VI	-	-	-
17	United States, California	6.1	9.6	V	Minor damage occurred in Independence and Lone Pine. A large rockslide occurred about 7 kilometers east of Eureka Valley Sand Dunes.	-	-
18	Philippines, Batan Islands offshore	6.8	168.6	IV	-	-	-
24	Argentina, Jujuy	6.2	221.0	V	It is a foreshock of the 7.0 quake eight seconds later.	-	-
24	Argentina, Jujuy	7.0	221.0	V	-	-	-
25	United States, Alaska offshore	6.2	36.8	VI	Slight damage occurred in Sand Point.	-	-
28	United States, California	5.2	20.6	VI	Slight damage occurred in Pumpkin Center.	-	-
29	Cabo Verde, São Vicente offshore	6.4	12.0	I	-	-	-
30	Indonesia, Halmahera offshore	6.1	80.9	V	-	-	-

=== June ===
June
- Strongest magnitude: 7.5 M_{w} Russia
- Total fatalities: 0

Number by magnitude
- 8.0–8.9: 0
- 7.0–7.9: 1
- 6.0–6.9: 13

Date	Country and location	M_{w}	Depth (km)	MMI	Notes	Casualties	
Date	Country and location	M_{w}	Depth (km)	MMI	Notes	Dead	Injured
1	Croatia, Varaždin	4.9	30.1	VII	Some damage occurred in Ludbreg.	-	-
3	Vanuatu, Sanma offshore	6.1	151.8	IV	-	-	-
5	United States, Minnesota	4.1	10.0	VI	Slight damage occurred in Wheaton.	-	-
6	Northern Mariana Islands offshore	6.5	13.5	I	-	-	-
8	United States, Hawaii	4.8	8.8	VI	Slight damage occurred in Naalehu.	-	-
8	Russia, Kamchatka offshore	7.5	70.6	VII	Damage was observed in Severo-Kurilsk. A tsunami was observed with maximum wave heights of 12 cm at Hilo, Hawaii.	-	-
8	Argentina, San Juan	6.3	112.7	VI	-	-	-
12	Russia, Kamchatka	6.3	44.2	V	It is an aftershock of the 7.5 quake four days prior.	-	-
15	Papua New Guinea, Madang	6.2	227.2	IV	-	-	-
18	New Zealand, Kermadec Islands offshore	6.6	15.6	I	This two similar-sized earthquakes occurring six hours apart can be considered a doublet earthquake.	-	-
18	New Zealand, Kermadec Islands offshore	6.7	10.7	I	This two similar-sized earthquakes occurring six hours apart can be considered a doublet earthquake.	-	-
18	New Zealand, Kermadec Islands offshore	6.0	28.9	I	It is an aftershock of the 6.6 and 6.7 quakes a few hours prior.	-	-
22	Iran, Fars	5.4	33.0	V	Several people were injured and at least 70 homes were destroyed in Bovir Ahmadi va Kohkiluyeh Province. Landslides blocked roads in the epicentral area.	-	Several
29	Australia, Macquarie Island offshore	6.4	10.0	I	–	-	-
30	Vanuatu region offshore	6.7	12.6	I	–	-	-

=== July ===
July
- Strongest magnitude: 7.7 M_{w} Japan
- Deadliest: 7.7 M_{w} Japan; 230 deaths
- Total fatalities: 234

Number by magnitude
- 8.0–8.9: 0
- 7.0–7.9: 1
- 6.0–6.9: 10

Date	Country and location	M_{w}	Depth (km)	MMI	Notes	Casualties	
Date	Country and location	M_{w}	Depth (km)	MMI	Notes	Dead	Injured
6	Chile, Easter Island offshore	6.4	10.0	I	-	-	-
8	Vanuatu region offshore	6.0	33.0	I	-	-	-
9	Tonga offshore	6.0	398.2	I	-	-	-
10	Costa Rica, Cartago	5.8	19.5	VI	One person was killed, another died of a heart attack and at least nine people were injured in the Turrialba area. Houses were damaged in Cartago and Turrialba and landslides occurred in the epicentral area.	2	9
11	Chile, Antofagasta	6.6	47.5	VI	Slight damage occurred in Taltal. Landslides occurred in the epicentral area.	-	-
12	Japan, Hokkaido offshore	7.7	16.7	VIII	The 1993 Okushiri earthquake caused major damage in the island of Hokkaido and the neighboring small island of Okushiri mostly due to a destructive tsunami with a maximum height of 32 meters that hit both islands a few minutes after the quake. 230 people were killed. The tsunami also affected southeastern Russia and South Korea.	230	-
12	Japan, Hokkaido offshore	6.0	28.5	V	Those were aftershocks of the 7.7 quake a few hours prior.	-	-
12	Japan, Hokkaido offshore	6.3	33.0	I	Those were aftershocks of the 7.7 quake a few hours prior.	-	-
14	Greece, West Greece	5.6	22.6	VII	At least five people were injured and 200 buildings were damaged at Patras.	-	5
22	Colombia, Arauca	6.1	20.3	VIII	Two people were killed, some were injured and many houses were destroyed at Puerto Rondon, Puerto Colombia.	2	Some
28	Papua New Guinea, Bougainville offshore	6.2	25.9	IV	-	-	-

=== August ===
August
- Strongest magnitude: 7.8 M_{w} Guam
- Deadliest: 5.5 M_{w} Sudan; 3 deaths
- Total fatalities: 3

Number by magnitude
- 8.0–8.9: 0
- 7.0–7.9: 3
- 6.0–6.9: 17

Date	Country and location	M_{w}	Depth (km)	MMI	Notes	Casualties	
Date	Country and location	M_{w}	Depth (km)	MMI	Notes	Dead	Injured
1	Sudan, North Kordofan	5.5	12.5	VII	Three people were killed, 10-20 others were injured, and damage occurred in Khartoum.	3	10–20
3	Egypt, Sinai Peninsula	6.1	10.0	VII	Some damage occurred in neighboring Saudi Arabia.	-	-
4	Indonesia, West Sumatra offshore	6.5	31.6	VI	-	-	-
7	Japan, Okinawa offshore	6.4	155.0	II	-	-	-
7	Japan, Hokkaido offshore	6.7	13.9	VI	Aftershock of the magnitude 7.7 earthquake in July.	-	-
8	Guam offshore	7.8	59.3	IX	Largest event of 1993. The 1993 Guam earthquake caused $250 million worth of damage as well as 71 injuries.	-	71
8	Tonga offshore, south of the Fiji Islands	6.7	523.1	I	-	-	-
9	Afghanistan, Badakhshan	6.4	204.2	IV	It is a foreshock of the 7.0 quake an hour later.	-	-
9	Afghanistan, Badakhshan	7.0	214.5	IV	-	-	-
10	New Zealand, Fiordland	7.0	28.1	VI	Power outages occurred in Te Anau.	-	-
10	New Zealand, Gisborne	6.4	14.4	VII	Some damage occurred in Gisborne.	-	-
11	Guam offshore	6.2	21.6	I	Aftershock of August 8 event.	-	-
13	New Zealand, Bay of Plenty offshore	6.3	95.2	I	-	-	-
16	Guam offshore	6.0	18.3	V	Aftershock of August 8 event.	-	-
20	Papua New Guinea, Hela	6.2	14.6	VII	Five people were injured and damage occurred in Tari.	-	5
25	Chile, Aysén offshore	6.2	10.0	I	-	-	-
31	Azerbaijan, Caspian Sea offshore	5.3	84.6	V	Some damage occurred in Derbent.	-	-

=== September ===
September
- Strongest magnitude: 7.2 M_{w} Mexico
- Deadliest: 6.2 M_{w} India; 9,748 deaths
- Total fatalities: 9,751

Number by magnitude
- 8.0–8.9: 0
- 7.0–7.9: 1
- 6.0–6.9: 20

Date	Country and location	M_{w}	Depth (km)	MMI	Notes	Casualties	
Date	Country and location	M_{w}	Depth (km)	MMI	Notes	Dead	Injured
1	Indonesia, Simeulue offshore	6.3	34.0	V	-	-	-
3	Mexico, Chiapas offshore	6.8	26.5	VI	This is a foreshock of the 7.2 quake one week later.	-	-
4	Afghanistan, Badakhshan	6.0	194.5	IV	-	-	-
4	Indonesia, Flores offshore	6.2	32.5	I	-	-	-
6	Papua New Guinea, New Ireland offshore	6.6	49.0	VI	-	-	-
7	New Zealand, Kermadec Islands offshore	6.5	10.0	I	-	-	-
10	Mexico, Chiapas offshore	6.0	63.3	IV	It is a foreshock of the 7.2 quake an hour later.	-	-
10	Mexico, Chiapas offshore	7.2	34.1	VII	Some damage occurred in Chiapas. In neighboring Guatemala, one person was killed, three were injured, landslides, and considerable damage was caused.	1	3
12	Guatemala, Santa Rosa offshore	6.0	68.2	V	Two old houses were destroyed in Mejicanos, in neighboring El Salvador.	-	-
15	New Zealand, Kermadec Islands offshore	6.3	19.7	IV	-	-	-
18	Afghanistan, Badakhshan	6.3	112.6	V	-	-	-
19	Mexico, Chiapas offshore	6.4	18.0	IV		-	-
20	Central Mid-Atlantic Ridge	6.3	10.0	I	-	-	-
21	United States, Oregon	5.9	8.6	VII	1993 Klamath Falls earthquakes: These two earthquakes caused structural damage and rockslides in the epicentral area, most especially in Klamath Falls for which the event is named. Two people were killed, one due to rockslides at U.S. Route 97, and another from a heart attack.	2	-
21	United States, Oregon	6.0	8.5	VII	1993 Klamath Falls earthquakes: These two earthquakes caused structural damage and rockslides in the epicentral area, most especially in Klamath Falls for which the event is named. Two people were killed, one due to rockslides at U.S. Route 97, and another from a heart attack.	2	-
23	Papua New Guinea, Bougainville offshore	6.1	27.5	V	-	-	-
26	Micronesia, Yap offshore	6.3	10.0	I	-	-	-
27	Falkland Islands offshore, south Atlantic Ocean	6.6	33.0	I	-	-	-
29	Indonesia, Gorontalo	6.4	96.6	VI	-	-	-
29	India, Maharashtra	6.2	10.0	VIII	Deadliest earthquake of 1993. The 1993 Latur earthquake caused extreme destruction in the Latur-Osmanabad areas. 52 villages were destroyed. 9,748 people perished and 30,000 were injured. 1 million people were displaced.	9,748	30,000
30	Mexico, Oaxaca offshore	6.5	19.2	IV	-	-	-

=== October ===
October
- Strongest magnitude: 6.9 M_{w} Japan; 6.9 M_{w} Papua New Guinea
- Deadliest: 6.9 M_{w} Papua New Guinea; 60 deaths
- Total fatalities: 64

Number by magnitude
- 8.0–8.9: 0
- 7.0–7.9: 0
- 6.0–6.9: 15

Date	Country and location	M_{w}	Depth (km)	MMI	Notes	Casualties	
Date	Country and location	M_{w}	Depth (km)	MMI	Notes	Dead	Injured
2	China, Xinjiang	6.1	14.1	I	-	-	-
5	Indonesia, Banda Sea offshore	6.6	13.1	I	-	-	-
10	Peru, Ica	5.1	48.8	V	Minor damage occurred in Ica.	-	-
10	Japan, Wakayama offshore	6.9	350.7	IV	One person died of a heart attack and four others were injured in Tokyo.	1	4
12	Colombia, Chocó offshore	5.2	102.6	IV	Some houses were damaged in southwestern Chocó department.	-	-
13	Papua New Guinea, Madang	6.9	25.3	IX	1993 Finisterre earthquakes: This earthquake was the first and the largest in an earthquake sequence that affected the Ramu-Markham Valley that affected the area over the month of October. 60 people were killed and 200 were injured, mostly due to landslides triggered by the shocks. Many villages near the epicenter were severely damaged.	60	200
13	Papua New Guinea, Madang	6.5	33.0	VI	Both earthquakes were part of the 1993 Finisterre earthquakes sequence.	-	-
13	Papua New Guinea, Madang	6.0	33.0	VI	Both earthquakes were part of the 1993 Finisterre earthquakes sequence.	-	-
16	Papua New Guinea, Madang	6.3	33.0	VI	This was another part of the 1993 Finisterre earthquakes sequence. Additional damage was caused, and three people were killed.	3	-
20	Nepal, Mid-Western	5.1	37.4	IV	At least 55 people were injured and 46 houses were severely damaged.	-	55
24	Mexico, Guerrero	6.7	20.7	VII	-	-	-
25	Papua New Guinea, Madang	6.7	30.4	VII	Part of the 1993 Finisterre earthquakes sequence.	-	-
25	Papua New Guinea, Madang	6.1	26.5	VI	Part of the 1993 Finisterre earthquakes sequence.	-	-

=== November ===
November
- Strongest magnitude: 7.0 M_{w} Russia
- Deadliest: 5.9 M_{w} Nicaragua; 1 death
- Total fatalities: 1

Number by magnitude
- 8.0–8.9: 0
- 7.0–7.9: 1
- 6.0–6.9: 8

Date	Country and location	M_{w}	Depth (km)	MMI	Notes	Casualties	
Date	Country and location	M_{w}	Depth (km)	MMI	Notes	Dead	Injured
5	Papua New Guinea, Bismarck Sea offshore	6.2	14.4	I	-	-	-
11	Papua New Guinea, New Britain offshore	6.0	45.8	V	-	-	-
12	India, Maharashtra	4.6	10.0	VI	25 people were injured and 100 houses were damaged in Latur. It is an aftershock of the 1993 Latur earthquake.	-	25
12	Lebanon, Mount Lebanon	4.2	10.0	IV	Slight damage occurred in Lebanon.	-	-
13	Mexico, Guerrero offshore	6.0	19.6	VI	-	-	-
13	Russia, Kamchatka offshore	7.0	34.0	VI	-	-	-
16	Pakistan, Balochistan	5.6	26.5	VI	100 houses were destroyed in Pishin.	-	-
17	Russia, Kamchatka offshore	6.0	33.2	V	Aftershock of the 7.0 quake four days prior.	-	-
18	United States, Alaska offshore	6.5	30.3	VI	Slight damage occurred at False Pass where items were overturned and a television was knocked onto the floor.	-	-
22	Nicaragua, Carazo	5.9	108.1	V	One person died of a heart attack.	1	-
26	Solomon Islands, Western offshore	6.2	17.1	I	-	-	-
30	China, Xinjiang	5.6	18.2	VI	Four people were injured and 100 houses were destroyed in Shufu.	-	4

=== December ===
December
- Strongest magnitude: 7.0 M_{w} Vanuatu
- Total fatalities: 0

Number by magnitude
- 8.0–8.9: 0
- 7.0–7.9: 1
- 6.0–6.9: 7

Date	Country and location	M_{w}	Depth (km)	MMI	Notes	Casualties	
Date	Country and location	M_{w}	Depth (km)	MMI	Notes	Dead	Injured
1	France, Mayotte offshore	5.2	10.0	VIII	Numerous buildings were damaged throughout Mayotte. It is the largest earthquake to hit the Comorian archipelago in almost 60 years.	-	-
4	United States, Oregon	5.1	4.8	VII	It is an aftershock of the 1993 Klamath Falls earthquake. This quake caused additional damage in Klamath Falls and slight damage on Tulelake, California.	-	-
8	India, Maharashtra	5.1	25.0	VI	Around 500 houses were damaged in western Maharashtra.	-	-
9	Indonesia, Molucca Sea offshore	6.9	14.5	IV	These two earthquakes of similar size occurring 7 hours apart can be considered a doublet earthquake.	-	-
9	Indonesia, Molucca Sea offshore	6.8	15.9	III	These two earthquakes of similar size occurring 7 hours apart can be considered a doublet earthquake.	-	-
10	Philippines, Batan Islands offshore	6.1	12.0	I	-	-	-
15	Taiwan, Tainan	5.4	17.0	VI	Some damage occurred in Dapu, Chiayi County.	-	-
20	Indonesia, Maluku	6.3	7.7	VI	-	-	-
23	Spain, Andalusia	5.3	27.4	VII	Some damage occurred in Adra.	-	-
29	Vanuatu, Tafea	7.0	33.0	VII	-	-	-
29	Vanuatu, Tafea	6.5	33.0	VI	Aftershock of the 7.0 event a few hours prior.	-	-
29	United States, Alaska	4.6	8.4	VI	Slight damage occurred in Salcha.	-	-
