= Institute of Seismological Research =

Earthquake research centre in Gandhinagar, India

- Established: 2003
- Director-General: Sumer Chopra
- Location: Gandhinagar, Gujarat, India
- Coordinates: 23°09′34.085″N 72°40′4.606″E
- Website: isr.gujarat.gov.in

Institute of Seismological Research (ISR) is an earthquake engineering and research center in Gandhinagar, India. In the aftermath of 2001 Gujarat earthquake, the institute was established by the Department of Science and Technology of Government of Gujarat in 2003.

== History ==
In 2003, Dr. J. G. Negi formulated the framework for Institute of Seismological Research (ISR) and established the centre with the funding from Asian Development Bank. He resigned in 2004 due to differences arising between him and the state government. Later, Prof. Naveenchandra N. Srivastava was deputed by Gujarat government to lead the institute. Formal research activities were commenced in 2006.

ISR is the nodal agency in the western state of Gujarat to deploy and maintain a sub-network of 22 broadband seismograph stations and 40 strong-motion accelerographs. The sub-network is the part of the larger network called Indian National Strong-Motion Instrumentation Network, operated by Department of Earthquake Engineering, Indian Institute of Technology Roorkee.

== See also ==
- National Centre for Seismology
