= List of earthquakes in India =

The Indian subcontinent has a history of earthquakes. The reason for the intensity and high frequency of earthquakes is the Indian plate driving into Asia at a rate of approximately 47 mm/year. The following is a list of major earthquakes which have occurred in India, including those with epicentres outside India that caused significant damage or casualties in the country.

== Earthquakes ==
The list pertains to the Republic of India since 1947, and the Indian subcontinent before that.

| Date | Location | Mag. | MMI | Deaths | Injuries | Total damage / notes | Ref |
|---|---|---|---|---|---|---|---|
| 2026-10-04 | Uttarakhand | 5.1 M_{w} | V | 5 | 8 | One building collapsed in Delhi | |
| 2026-02-27 | Bangladesh, West Bengal | 5.3 M_{w} | VI | | | | |
| 2025-11-21 | Bangladesh, West Bengal | 5.4 M_{w} | VI | | | | |
| 2025-09-14 | Assam | 5.5 M_{w} | VII | | 2 | Many buildings damaged in Central and North Assam division. | |
| 2023-11-03 | North India, Nepal | 5.7 M_{w} | VIII | 153 | 375 | Buildings damaged, all casualties in Nepal | |
| 2022-07-28 | Baikunthpur, Chhattisgarh | 4.6 M_{w} | IV | | 5 | Minor | |
| 2021-04-28 | Assam | 6.0 M_{w} | VII | 2 | 12 | Moderate damage | |
| 2019-07-24 | Maharashtra | 4.1 M_{w} | IV | 1 | 1 | Minor | |
| 2018-09-12 | Assam | 5.3 M_{w} | VI | 1 | 25 | | |
| 2017-01-03 | India, Bangladesh | 5.7 M_{w} | V | 3 | 8 | | |
| 2016-01-04 | India, Myanmar, Bangladesh | 6.7 M_{w} | VII | 11 | 200 | | |
| 2015-10-26 | Afghanistan, India, Pakistan | 7.7 M_{w} | VII | 399 | 2,536 | | |
| 2015-05-12 | Nepal, India | 7.3 M_{w} | VIII | 218 | 3,500+ | | |
| 2015-04-25 | Nepal, India | 7.8 M_{w} | X | 8,964 | 21,952 | $10 billion | |
| 2014-05-21 | offshore Odisha | 6.0 M_{w} | IV | 2 | 250 | Buildings damaged / Power outages | |
| 2013-05-01 | Kashmir | 5.7 M_{w} | | 3 | 90 | $19.5 million | |
| 2012-03-05 | Delhi | 5.2 M_{w} | V | | 5 | | |
| 2011-10-29 | Sikkim | 3.5 M_{w} | III | 2 | | | |
| 2011-09-18 | Gangtok, Sikkim | 6.9 M_{w} | VII | 111+ | | | |
| 2011-09-07 | Delhi | 4.3 M_{w} | V | | 1 | Minor damage | |
| 2010-03-30 | Diglipur, Andaman and Nicobar Islands | 6.6 M_{w} | VI | | 10 | Buildings damaged | |
| 2009-08-10 | Andaman Islands | 7.5 M_{w} | VIII | | | Tsunami warning issued | |
| 2009-03-26 | Jharkhand | 4.1 M_{w} | V | | 5 | Buildings damaged | |
| 2008-09-16 | Satara district, Maharashtra | 5.0 M_{w} | VI | 1 | 20 | 1,500 buildings damaged. | |
| 2008-02-06 | West Bengal | 4.3 M_{b} | | 1 | 50 | Buildings damaged | |
| 2007-11-06 | Gujarat | 5.1 M_{w} | V | 1 | 5 | Buildings damaged | |
| 2006-11-29 | Alwar district, Rajasthan | 4.0 M_{w} | | 1 | 2 | Minor damage to property | |
| 2006-03-07 | Gujarat | 5.5 M_{w} | VI | | 7 | Buildings damaged | |
| 2006-02-14 | Sikkim | 5.3 M_{w} | V | 2 | 2 | Landslide | |
| 2005-12-14 | Uttarakhand | 5.1 M_{w} | VI | 1 | 3 | Building destroyed | |
| 2005-10-08 | Kashmir | 7.6 M_{w} | VIII | 86,000–87,351 | 69,000–75,266 | 2.8 million displaced | |
| 2002-09-13 | Andaman Islands | 6.5 M_{w} | | 2 | | Destructive tsunami | |
| 2001-09-25 | offshore Tamil Nadu | 5.2 M_{w} | V | 3 | | Minor damage | |
| 2001-01-26 | Gujarat | 7.7 M_{w} | X | 13,805–20,023 | ~166,800 | $10 billion | |
| 1999-03-29 | Chamoli district-Uttarakhand | 6.8 M_{w} | VIII | ~103 | | | |
| 1997-11-21 | Bangladesh, India | 6.1 M_{w} | | 23 | 200 | | |
| 1997-05-22 | Jabalpur, Madhya Pradesh | 5.8 M_{w} | VIII | 38–56 | 1,000–1,500 | $37–143 million | |
| 1993-09-30 | Latur, Maharashtra | 6.2 M_{w} | VIII | 9,748 | 30,000 | | |
| 1991-10-20 | Uttarkashi, Uttarakhand | 6.8 M_{w} | IX | 768–2,000 | 1,383–1,800 | | |
| 1988-08-21 | Udayapur, Nepal | 6.9 M_{w} | VIII | 709–1,450 | | | |
| 1988-08-06 | Myanmar, India | 7.3 M_{w} | VII | 3 | 12 | | |
| 1988-02-06 | Bangladesh, India | 5.9 M_{w} | | 2 | 100 | | |
| 1986-04-26 | India, Pakistan | 5.3 M_{s} | | 6 | 30 | Severe damage | |
| 1984-12-30 | Cachar district | 5.6 M_{b} | | 20 | 100 | Severe damage | |
| 1982-01-20 | Little Nicobar | 6.3 M_{s} | | | Some | Moderate damage | |
| 1980-08-23 | Kashmir | 4.8 M_{s} | | Few | | Limited damage / doublet | |
| 1980-08-23 | Kashmir | 4.9 M_{s} | | 15 | 40 | Moderate damage / doublet | |
| 1980-07-29 | Pithoragarh district (Nepal) | 6.5 M_{s} | | 200 | Many | $245 million | |
| 1975-01-19 | Himachal Pradesh | 6.8 M_{s} | IX | 47 | | | |
| 1970-03-23 | Bharuch district | 5.4 M_{b} | | 26 | 200 | Moderate damage | |
| 1967-12-11 | Maharashtra | 6.6 M_{w} | VIII | 177–180 | 2,272 | $400,000 | |
| 1966-08-15 | North India | 5.6 | | 15 | | Limited damage | |
| 1966-06-27 | Nepal, India | 5.3 M_{s} | VIII | 80 | 100 | $1 million | |
| 1963-09-02 | Kashmir | 5.3 | | 80 | | Moderate damage | |
| 1960-08-27 | North India | | | | | Moderate damage | |
| 1956-07-21 | Gujarat | 6.1 M_{s} | IX | 115 | 254 | | |
| 1954-03-21 | India, Myanmar | 7.4 M_{s} | | | | Moderate damage | |
| 1950-08-15 | Assam, Tibet | 8.6 M_{w} | XI | 1,500–3,300 | | | |
| 1947-07-29 | India, China | 7.3 M_{w} | | | | | |
| 1941-06-26 | Andaman Islands | 7.7–8.1 M_{w} | | 8,000 | | Destructive tsunami | |
| 1935-05-31 | Quetta, Baluchistan | 7.7 M_{w} | X | 30,000–60,000 | | | |
| 1934-01-15 | Bihar-Nepal | 8.0 M_{w} | XI | 6,000–10,700 | | | |
| 1932-08-14 | Assam, Myanmar | 7.0 M_{s} | | | | Moderate damage | |
| 1930-07-02 | Assam | 7.1 M_{w} | IX | | | | |
| 1905-04-04 | Kangra | 7.8 M_{s} | IX | 20,000+ | | | |
| 1897-06-12 | Shillong, India | 8.0 M_{w} | X | 1,542 | | | |
| 1885-06-06 | Kashmir | | | | | Severe damage | |
| 1885-05-30 | Srinagar | | | 3,000 | | Extreme damage | |
| 1881-12-31 | Andaman Islands | 7.9 M_{w} | VII | | | Significant in seismology | |
| 1869-01-10 | Assam, Cachar | 7.4 M_{w} | VII | 2 | | Severe damage | |
| 1845-06-19 | Rann of Kutch | 6.3 M_{s} | VIII | Few | | Limited damage / tsunami | |
| 1843-04-01 | Deccan Plateau | | | | | Moderate damage | |
| 1833-08-26 | Bihar, Kathmandu | 8.0 M_{s} | | | | Severe damage | |
| 1828-06-06 | Kashmir | | | 1,000 | | Severe damage | |
| 1819-06-16 | Gujarat | 7.7–8.2 M_{w} | XI | 1,543+ | | Formed the Allah Bund | |
| 1803-09-01 | Uttarakhand | 7.8 M_{w} | IX | 300 | | Severe damage | |
| 1618-05-26 | Bombay | | IX | 2,000 | | Severe damage | |
| 1555-09-?? | Kashmir Valley, Kashmir | 7.6–8.0 | | 600–60,000 | | | |
| 1505-06-06 | Saldang, Karnali zone | 8.2–8.8 | | 6,000 | | | |
Note: The inclusion criteria for adding events are based on WikiProject Earthquakes' notability guideline that was developed for stand-alone articles. The principles described also apply to lists. In summary, only damaging, detrimental, or deadly events should be recorded.

== See also ==
- Earthquake zones of India
- Geology of India
