= Nanded earthquakes =

Earthquake cluster in Nanded, India

The Nanded earthquakes were an earthquake swarm of over 500 events that has affected the town of Nanded in Maharashtra, India, that began in 2006. They were natural explosive sounds that were sometimes accompanied by mild tremors. The strongest events were felt on 31 March 2007, 12 November 2007, 14 December 2007, and on 3 March 2011. Each event caused widespread panic. Residents in the northern parts of Nanded that has been affected the most by the tremors moved to safer areas or stayed outdoors in temporary shelters in front of their homes.

== Earthquakes ==
Nanded is in seismic zone 2. The exact cause of the tremors & explosive sounds is not yet known, but the city is within 150 km (93 mi) of where the 1993 Latur earthquake took place. At that time minor tremors were experienced in Nanded.

Residents in Nanded panicked and ran out of their homes at 3:17 am on Thursday, 3 March 2011, when they felt earthquake tremors near magnitude 3. People were forced to abandon their homes to come out on the streets and open spaces as there were at least 39 aftershocks within the next 2 hours. These shocks were felt by the residents in Srinagar, Viveknagar, Kailashnagar, Snehnagar, Purna road, and Bhagyanagar. Though no casualties or damage were reported, the residents were terrorized by the tremors. The Nanded district collector called for an urgent meeting of the municipal council's section of disaster management and scientists from the National Geophysical Research Institute (NGRI), Hyderabad and Geological Survey of India (GSI), Nagpur were studying the shocks.

On Wednesday 31 August 2011, two shocks were experienced, the larger of the two being at 3:06 am local time. The second shock was accompanied with an explosive sound in the ground. Government officials and the media did not comment or publish any news on these shocks. Minor explosive sounds were heard in the ground on 7 September 2011 at around 9:00 am and again at 4:00 pm. The scientists from the NGRI, Hyderabad and GSI, Nagpur did not announce any of their observations or update their research results.

== Cause ==
The epicentres of the earthquakes define a northwest–southeast trending fault plane, parallel to most of the mapped faults in the area. The focal mechanism derived from all of the minor earthquakes is consistent with high-angle reverse faulting.
