= List of earthquakes in 1950 =

Earthquakes in 1950
Approximate epicenters of the earthquakes in 1950
- 4.0–5.9 magnitude
- 6.0–6.9 magnitude
- 7.0–7.9 magnitude
- 8.0+ magnitude
- Strongest: India, Arunachal Pradesh (Magnitude 8.6) August 15
- Deadliest: India, Arunachal Pradesh (Magnitude 8.6) August 15 1,530 deaths
- Total fatalities: 1,756

Number by magnitude
- 9.0+: 0

This is a list of earthquakes in 1950. Only magnitude 6.0 or greater earthquakes appear on the list. Lower magnitude events are included if they have caused death, injury or damage. Events which occurred in remote areas will be excluded from the list as they wouldn't have generated significant media interest. All dates are listed according to UTC time. The main event which dominated the year in terms of magnitude and deaths was the earthquake which struck India in August. With a magnitude of 8.6, it was one of the largest earthquakes of all time, and affected the eastern part of the country. There were 1,530 deaths, which was around three quarters of the yearly total. A number of other deadly events struck Venezuela and Peru. There were 21 magnitude 7.0+ quakes. Aside from India, Chile was hit by a magnitude 8.2 event in December that left one person dead. Aftershock sequences contributed to a large number of magnitude 6.0–6.9 events, especially in India and New Hebrides (which also saw four magnitude 7.0+ quakes).

== Overall ==
=== By death toll ===
Rank	Death toll	Magnitude	Location	MMI	Depth (km)	Date
1	1,530	8.6	India, Arunachal Pradesh	XI (Extreme)	15.0	August 15
2	100	6.4	Venezuela, Lara (state)	VII (Very strong)	15.0	August 3
3	83	6.0	Peru, Cusco Region	( )	100.0	May 21
4	20	5.7	Iran, Hormozgan Province	VII (Very strong)	15.0	January 19
5	16	6.6	Indonesia, Java	VII (Very strong)	45.0	June 19

- Note: At least 10 casualties

=== By magnitude ===
Rank	Magnitude	Death toll	Location	MMI	Depth (km)	Date
1	8.6	1,530	India, Arunachal Pradesh	XI (Extreme)	15.0	August 15
2	8.2	1	Chile, Antofagasta Region	VII (Very strong)	113.9	December 9
3	7.9	0	New Hebrides, Vanuatu	VI (Strong)	30.0	December 2
4	7.8	0	Tonga	VI (Strong)	215.9	December 14
= 5	7.7	0	Russian Soviet Federative Socialist Republic, Sea of Okhotsk	V (Moderate)	329.0	February 28
= 5	7.7	0	Indonesia, Banda Sea	VI (Strong)	199.7	November 2
= 6	7.5	0	Afghanistan, Badakhshan Province	( )	215.4	July 9
= 6	7.5	0	Costa Rica, Guanacaste Province	VII (Very strong)	97.9	October 5
7	7.3	1	Indonesia, Banda Sea	VI (Strong)	20.0	October 8
= 8	7.2	0	Indonesia, Papua (province)	VII (Very strong)	30.0	September 19
= 8	7.2	0	Guatemala, near Champerico, Retalhuleu Department	VII (Very strong)	65.3	October 23
= 8	7.2	0	New Hebrides, Vanuatu	( )	60.0	December 2
= 8	7.2	0	Australia, southeast of New Ireland (island), Papua and New Guinea	( )	78.3	December 4
= 8	7.2	0	New Zealand, Kermadec Islands	( )	298.4	December 10
= 9	7.1	0	New Hebrides, southwest of Aneityum, Vanuatu	VII (Very strong)	50.0	May 26
= 9	7.1	0	Argentina, Santiago del Estero Province	( )	610.0	August 14
= 9	7.1	0	New Hebrides, Vanuatu	( )	141.3	September 10
= 9	7.1	0	Mexico, Guerrero	VII (Very strong)	35.0	December 14
= 10	7.0	0	United States, southwest of Guam	( )	77.3	May 25
= 10	7.0	0	Brazil, Acre (state)	( )	646.2	July 9
= 10	7.0	0	Philippines, southeast of Mindanao	( )	120.0	August 31

- Note: At least 7.0 magnitude

== Notable events ==
=== January ===
January
- Strongest: 6.8 M_{w} 2 events
- Deadliest: 5.7 M_{w} Iran; 20 deaths
- Total fatalities: 21+

Number by magnitude
- 8.0–8.9: 0
- 7.0–7.9: 0
- 6.0–6.9: 6
- 5.0–5.9: 1

Date	Country and location	M_{w}	Depth (km)	MMI	Notes	Casualties	
Date	Country and location	M_{w}	Depth (km)	MMI	Notes	Dead	Injured
3	Philippines, northern Luzon	6.5	30.0	VI			
3	Chile, off the coast of Aisen Region	6.3	15.0				
12	Fiji	6.8	539.9				
13	Australia, southeast of New Ireland (island), Papua and New Guinea	6.5	69.9				
19	Iran, Hormozgan Province	5.7	15.0	VII	20 people were killed and major damage was caused.	20	
24	New Hebrides, Vanuatu	6.5	165.0				
30	Chile, Magallanes y la Antartica Chilena Region	6.8	15.0	VII	At least 1 person was killed. Aftershock of events in the area from December 1949.	1+	

=== February ===
February
- Strongest: 7.7 M_{w}, Russian Soviet Federative Socialist Republic
- Total fatalities: 0

Number by magnitude
- 8.0–8.9: 0
- 7.0–7.9: 1
- 6.0–6.9: 7

Date	Country and location	M_{w}	Depth (km)	MMI	Notes	Casualties	
Date	Country and location	M_{w}	Depth (km)	MMI	Notes	Dead	Injured
2	Burma, Shan State	6.9	35.0	rowspan="2"| Some damage was caused. Doublet earthquake.			
3	Burma, Shan State	6.7	35.0	VI			
11	Tonga	6.5	254.4				
12	Fiji	6.3	20.0	VII			
23	Fiji	6.5	210.0				
25	Mongolia, Bayankhongor Province	6.1	15.0	VII			
25	Japan, Ryukyu Islands	6.3	25.0				
28	Russian Soviet Federative Socialist Republic, Sea of Okhotsk	7.7	329.0	V			

=== March ===
March
- Strongest: 6.8 M_{w}, Peru
- Total fatalities: 0

Number by magnitude
- 8.0–8.9: 0
- 7.0–7.9: 0
- 6.0–6.9: 4

Date	Country and location	M_{w}	Depth (km)	MMI	Notes	Casualties	
Date	Country and location	M_{w}	Depth (km)	MMI	Notes	Dead	Injured
7	Philippines, west of Guimaras Island	6.7	25.0	VII			
14	Peru, Ucayali Region	6.8	150.0				
27	Indonesia, off the west coast of southern Sumatra	6.4	35.0				
29	Indonesia, Papua (province)	6.5	83.7				

=== April ===
April
- Strongest: 6.9 M_{w}, Russian Soviet Federative Socialist Republic
- Total fatalities: 0

Number by magnitude
- 8.0–8.9: 0
- 7.0–7.9: 0
- 6.0–6.9: 4

Date	Country and location	M_{w}	Depth (km)	MMI	Notes	Casualties	
Date	Country and location	M_{w}	Depth (km)	MMI	Notes	Dead	Injured
4	Japan, Ryukyu Islands	6.0	55.0				
4	Russian Soviet Federative Socialist Republic, Buryatia	6.9	35.0	VII			
15	Guatemala, off the west coast	6.0	35.0	V			
26	Japan, Wakayama Prefecture, Honshu	6.3	48.6	VI			

=== May ===
May
- Strongest: 7.1 M_{w}, New Hebrides
- Deadliest: 6.0 M_{w}, Peru; 83 deaths
- Total fatalities: 83

Number by magnitude
- 8.0–8.9: 0
- 7.0–7.9: 2
- 6.0–6.9: 11

Date	Country and location	M_{w}	Depth (km)	MMI	Notes	Casualties	
Date	Country and location	M_{w}	Depth (km)	MMI	Notes	Dead	Injured
9	Turkmen Soviet Socialist Republic, Ahal Region	6.1	15.0	VII			
10	Mozambique Channel	6.2	15.0				
17	Sea of Japan	6.7	579.3				
17	New Hebrides, Vanuatu	6.7	35.0				
21	Peru, Cusco Region	6.0	100.0		83 people were killed and major damage was caused.	83	
25	United States, northern Alaska	6.0	0.0		Unknown depth.		
25	United States, southwest of Guam	7.0	77.3				
26	New Hebrides, southwest of Aneityum, Vanuatu	7.1	50.0	rowspan="2"| Doublet earthquake. The second event was only 14 seconds after the first.			
26	New Hebrides, Vanuatu	6.9	35.0	V			
27	Fiji	6.8	588.3				
30	United States, Hawaii (island), Hawaii	6.3	15.0	VII			
30	Fiji	6.4	590.0				
31	Japan, Ryukyu Islands	6.2	46.0	IV			

=== June ===
June
- Strongest: 6.9 M_{w}, New Hebrides
- Deadliest: 6.6 M_{w}, Indonesia; 16 deaths
- Total fatalities: 16

Number by magnitude
- 8.0–8.9: 0
- 7.0–7.9: 0
- 6.0–6.9: 10

Date	Country and location	M_{w}	Depth (km)	MMI	Notes	Casualties	
Date	Country and location	M_{w}	Depth (km)	MMI	Notes	Dead	Injured
4	Philippines, southeast of Mindanao	6.0	15.0	VI			
7	Peru, Loreto Region	6.8	115.5				
17	New Zealand, Manawatu-Whanganui, North Island	6.0	192.0				
17	Japan, off the east coast of Honshu	6.0	35.0	IV			
19	Indonesia, Java	6.6	45.0	VII	16 people were killed and another 50 were hurt. 50 homes were destroyed.	16	50
21	New Hebrides, Vanuatu	6.7	35.0				
21	Australia, off the north coast of Papua and New Guinea	6.3	20.0				
24	New Hebrides, Vanuatu	6.9	35.0	VI			
25	Philippines, southeast of Mindanao	6.2	57.6	IV			
27	Japan, off the west coast of Hokkaido	6.3	15.0	V			

=== July ===
July
- Strongest: 7.5 M_{w}, Afghanistan
- Total fatalities: 0

Number by magnitude
- 8.0–8.9: 0
- 7.0–7.9: 2
- 6.0–6.9: 9

Date	Country and location	M_{w}	Depth (km)	MMI	Notes	Casualties	
Date	Country and location	M_{w}	Depth (km)	MMI	Notes	Dead	Injured
9	Brazil, Acre (state)	6.8	646.0	rowspan="2"| Doublet earthquake.			
9	Brazil, Acre (state)	7.0	646.2				
9	Brazil, Acre (state)	6.4	633.8		Aftershock.		
9	Afghanistan, Badakhshan Province	7.5	215.4				
13	Japan, Bonin Islands	6.9	511.6				
18	Philippines, northern Mindanao	6.1	15.0	VII			
20	Fiji	6.5	35.0				
21	New Zealand, Kermadec Islands	6.8	20.0				
21	New Hebrides, Vanuatu	6.4	15.0	VI			
29	Indonesia, northern Molucca Sea	6.3	30.0	IV			
29	Australia, southwest of Bougainville Island, Papua and New Guinea	6.7	65.0	VI			

=== August ===
August
- Strongest: 8.6 M_{w}, India
- Deadliest: 8.6 M_{w}, India; 1,530 deaths
- Total fatalities: 1,630

Number by magnitude
- 8.0–8.9: 1
- 7.0–7.9: 2
- 6.0–6.9: 23

Date	Country and location	M_{w}	Depth (km)	MMI	Notes	Casualties	
Date	Country and location	M_{w}	Depth (km)	MMI	Notes	Dead	Injured
3	Mexico, Guerrero	6.1	80.5				
3	United States, southwest of Guam	6.5	20.0				
3	Japan, off the east coast of Honshu	6.5	96.0				
3	Venezuela, Lara (state)	6.4	15.0	VII	100 people were killed.	100	
7	Philippines, southern Mindanao	6.8	135.5				
14	Argentina, Santiago del Estero Province	7.1	610.0				
15	India, Arunachal Pradesh	8.6	15.0	XI	The 1950 Assam–Tibet earthquake was one of the largest of all time. 1,530 people were killed and major property damage was caused. Costs were around $20 million (1950 rate). Many large aftershocks followed. These events have been plotted on the map but are not listed to prevent cluttering.	1,530	
17	Fiji, south of	6.9	609.8				
21	China, southern Qinghai Province	6.0	15.0	VII			
22	Russian Soviet Federative Socialist Republic, eastern Kamchatka Krai	6.0	64.4	V			
26	United States, northern Alaska	6.0	15.0				
29	Indonesia, off the west coast of Sumatra	6.3	55.0	VI			
30	Indonesia, northeast Banda Sea	6.1	20.0	IV			
31	Philippines, southeast of Mindanao	7.0	120.0				

=== September ===
September
- Strongest: 7.2 M_{w}, Indonesia
- Total fatalities: 0

Number by magnitude
- 8.0–8.9: 0
- 7.0–7.9: 2
- 6.0–6.9: 13

Date	Country and location	M_{w}	Depth (km)	MMI	Notes	Casualties	
Date	Country and location	M_{w}	Depth (km)	MMI	Notes	Dead	Injured
7	New Zealand, south of the Kermadec Islands	6.5	50.0				
9	Australia, New Ireland (island), Papua and New Guinea	6.3	25.0	VI			
10	Japan, off the southeast coast of Honshu	6.1	35.0	V			
10	New Hebrides, Vanuatu	7.1	141.3				
13	China, Yunnan Province	6.0	15.0	VIII	320 homes were destroyed.		
14	Indonesia, Molucca Sea	6.2	35.0				
16	United States, Rat Islands, Alaska	6.6	100.0				
18	Brazil, Acre (state)	6.0	635.3				
19	Indonesia, Papua (province)	7.2	30.0	VII			
22	Fiji	6.8	400.4				
25	Philippines, northeast of Mindanao	6.0	25.0	VI			
28	Taiwan, off the east coast of	6.1	15.0	VI			
29	Mexico, off the coast of Jalisco	6.6	15.0				

=== October ===
October
- Strongest: 7.5 M_{w}, Costa Rica
- Deadliest: 7.3 M_{w}, Indonesia; 1 death
- Total fatalities: 1

Number by magnitude
- 8.0–8.9: 0
- 7.0–7.9: 3
- 6.0–6.9: 14

Date	Country and location	M_{w}	Depth (km)	MMI	Notes	Casualties	
Date	Country and location	M_{w}	Depth (km)	MMI	Notes	Dead	Injured
5	Costa Rica, Guanacaste Province	7.5	97.9	VII	At least 101 people were injured and some damage was reported.		101+
8	Indonesia, Banda Sea	7.3	20.0	VI	A tsunami swept across Ambon Island causing 1 death and major damage.	1	
8	Australia, southeast of New Britain, Papua and New Guinea	6.2	15.0				
10	New Zealand, Southland, New Zealand	6.0	15.0				
15	United Kingdom, Guadalcanal, Solomon Islands	6.2	35.0	VI			
21	Tonga, Vava'u	6.3	45.0				
23	Guatemala, Champerico	7.2	65.3	VII	Many homes were destroyed or damaged. Several large aftershocks followed but are not listed to prevent cluttering.		

=== November ===
November
- Strongest: 7.7 M_{w}, Indonesia
- Total fatalities: 0

Number by magnitude
- 8.0–8.9: 0
- 7.0–7.9: 1
- 6.0–6.9: 4

Date	Country and location	M_{w}	Depth (km)	MMI	Notes	Casualties	
Date	Country and location	M_{w}	Depth (km)	MMI	Notes	Dead	Injured
2	Indonesia, Banda Sea	7.7	199.7	VI			
5	Japan, southeast of Shikoku	6.7	25.0	VI			
8	United Kingdom, Guadalcanal, Solomon Islands	6.6	15.0	VII			
14	United Kingdom, Makira, Solomon Islands	6.0	35.0	VI			
17	Mexico, off the coast of Guerrero	6.1	20.0	XI	Some damage was reported.		

=== December ===
December
- Strongest: 8.2 M_{w}, Chile
- Deadliest: 6.3 M_{w}, Peru; 4 deaths
- Total fatalities: 5

Number by magnitude
- 8.0–8.9: 1
- 7.0–7.9: 6
- 6.0–6.9: 8

Date	Country and location	M_{w}	Depth (km)	MMI	Notes	Casualties	
Date	Country and location	M_{w}	Depth (km)	MMI	Notes	Dead	Injured
2	Brazil, Acre (state)	6.8	643.3				
2	New Hebrides, Vanuatu	7.9	30.0	VI			
2	New Hebrides, Vanuatu	7.2	60.0		This large aftershock came only 4 minutes after the mainshock.		
4	Australia, southeast of New Ireland (island), Papua and New Guinea	7.2	78.3				
5	Japan, southeast of the Ryukyu Islands	6.0	25.0				
9	Chile, Antofagasta Region	8.2	113.9	VII	1 person was killed and at least 51 were injured in the 1950 Calama earthquake.	1	51+
10	Peru, Ica Region	6.3	61.5	VI	4 people were killed and 12 were injured. Some homes were destroyed.	4	12
10	New Zealand, Kermadec Islands	7.2	298.4				
11	Brazil, Acre (state)	6.2	644.5		Aftershock.		
14	New Hebrides, Vanuatu	6.5	65.0				
14	Tonga	7.8	215.9	VI			
14	Mexico, Guerrero	7.1	35.0	VII	Some damage was reported.		
18	Indonesia, Ambon Island	6.3	35.0	VI			
28	Brazil, Acre (state)	6.2	635.0		Aftershock.		
29	China, western Xizang Province	6.1	15.0	VII			
