= 1993 Scotts Mills earthquake =

Earthquake in Oregon

- Location within Oregon
- UTC time: 1993-03-25 13:34:37
- ISC event: 244845
- USGS-ANSS: ComCat
- Local date: March 25, 1993
- Local time: 05:34:37
- Magnitude: 5.6 M_{w}
- Depth: 16.2 km (10 mi)
- Epicenter: 45.06°N 122.55°W
- Type: Oblique-slip
- Areas affected: Western Oregon; United States
- Total damage: $28 million
- Max. intensity: MMI VII (Very strong)
- Peak acceleration: 0.06 g
- Casualties: Six injured

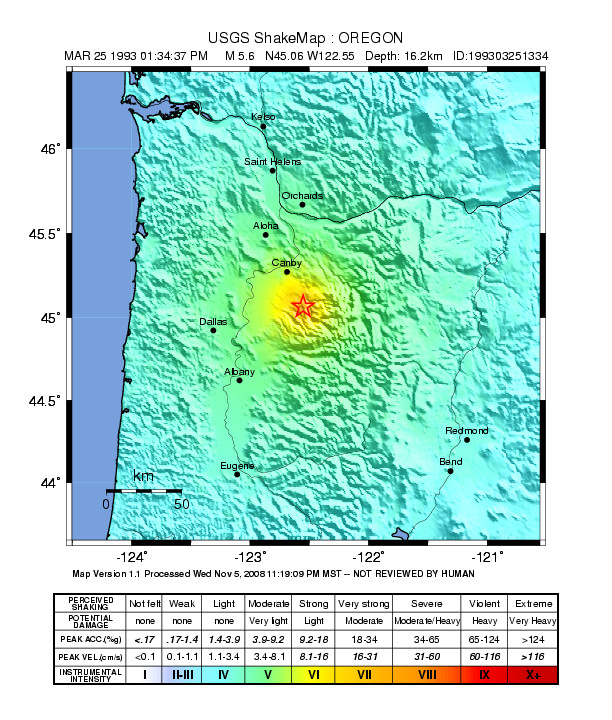
USGS ShakeMap

The 1993 Scotts Mills earthquake, also known as the "Spring break quake", occurred in the U.S. state of Oregon on March 25 at 5:34 AM Pacific Standard Time. With a moment magnitude of 5.6 and a maximum perceived intensity of VII (Very strong) on the Mercalli intensity scale, it was the largest earthquake in the Pacific Northwest since the Elk Lake and Goat Rocks earthquakes of 1981. Ground motion was widely felt in Oregon's Willamette Valley, the Portland metropolitan area, and as far north as the Puget Sound area near Seattle, Washington.

== Earthquake ==
The Scotts Mills mainshock epicenter was located about 5 kilometers (3.1 mi) east of the town of Scotts Mills in Marion County, and about 54 kilometers (34 mi) south of Portland. The United States Geological Survey reported that strong motion instruments recorded peak ground accelerations of 0.06 g at Detroit Dam, 44 kilometers (27 mi) to the southeast, and also give an extensive review of damage reports and ground motion intensities.

Reports of the earthquake came from as far as Roseburg in southern Oregon, 165 miles (266 km) south of the epicenter, to the coastal town of Lincoln City, east to Bend, and north to Seattle. The seismology lab from the University of Washington in Seattle reported the Richter magnitude to be 5.4, but stated that the initial figure could change. An aftershock measuring 3.2 happened within the first hour of the main shock.

== Damage ==
Most structural damage consisted of toppled chimneys and failure of walls of unreinforced masonry. Buildings with damage include Molalla High School, the State Capitol in Salem, and the St. Paul Church in Saint Paul. The damage at the capitol occurred in the old wing and that section of the facility was closed after the morning earthquake, and two walls at the high school were partially collapsed. Additional damage to some homes occurred in Molalla in the form of broken windows and brick planters at some homes there. No damage was reported in Portland, but residents did see books knocked off shelves and some car alarms were set off. Several people were treated at the Salem Hospital for injuries related to falling glass.

== Previous events ==
A similar sized earthquake occurred in 1877 and Portland was struck by a magnitude 5.5 quake in 1962, but geophysicists say the area is vulnerable to even larger earthquakes, such as the 1872 North Cascades earthquake.

== See also ==
- List of earthquakes in 1993
- List of earthquakes in the United States
- 1993 Klamath Falls earthquakes
