= 2017 Tripura earthquake =

Earthquake in India and Bangladesh

- Location within Tripura Location within India
- UTC time: 2017-01-03 09:09:02
- ISC event: 611831467
- USGS-ANSS: ComCat
- Local date: 3 January 2017
- Local time: 02:39 p.m IST
- Magnitude: 5.7 M_{w}
- Depth: 32.0 km (19.9 mi)
- Epicenter: 24.015°N 92.018°E
- Areas affected: Bangladesh; India
- Max. intensity: MMI VI (Strong)
- Casualties: 3 dead, 8 injured

A magnitude 5.7 earthquake struck India 20 km (12 mi) east north-east of Ambassa in the state of Tripura on 3 January 2017 with a maximum observed intensity of 6-7 EMS. It struck at 2:39 pm local time (09:09 UTC), and was centered in an isolated area. The estimated depth was 32.0 km.

One person died and five others were injured in India. At least 50 houses were damaged due to landslides that occurred in Dhalai district, while roads were blocked after trees were uprooted. According to the Tripura State Disaster Management Authority, at least 6,727 buildings were damaged in Tripura in the districts of Dhalai and Unakoti. Shaking was felt in many parts of north-eastern India including as far as Kolkata. The tremor was also felt in neighboring Bangladesh, where two people died and three others were injured. The earthquake caused liquefaction on the banks of the Manu river in Tripura and along the Dhalai river in adjacent parts of Bangladesh, in particular in the Kamalganj area.

== See also ==
- List of earthquakes in 2017
- List of earthquakes in India
- List of earthquakes in Bangladesh
