= Body wave magnitude =

Body-waves consist of P waves that are the first to arrive (see seismogram), or S waves, or reflections of either. Body-waves travel through rock directly.

== mB scale ==
The original "body-wave magnitude" – mB or m_{B} (uppercase "B") – was developed by Gutenberg (1945b, 1945c) and Gutenberg & Richter (1956) to overcome the distance and magnitude limitations of the M_{L} scale inherent in the use of surface waves. mB is based on the P- and S-waves, measured over a longer period, and does not saturate until around M 8. However, it is not sensitive to events smaller than about M 5.5. Use of mB as originally defined has been largely abandoned, now replaced by the standardized mB_{BB} scale.

== mb scale ==
The mb or m_{b} scale (lowercase "m" and "b") is similar to mB, but uses only P-waves measured in the first few seconds on a specific model of short-period seismograph. It was introduced in the 1960s with the establishment of the World-Wide Standardized Seismograph Network (WWSSN); the short period improves detection of smaller events, and better discriminates between tectonic earthquakes and underground nuclear explosions.

Measurement of mb has changed several times. As originally defined by Gutenberg (1945c) m_{b} was based on the maximum amplitude of waves in the first 10 seconds or more. However, the length of the period influences the magnitude obtained. Early USGS/NEIC practice was to measure mb on the first second (just the first few P-waves), but since 1978 they measure the first twenty seconds. The modern practice is to measure short-period mb scale at less than three seconds, while the broadband mB_{BB} scale is measured at periods of up to 30 seconds.

== mb_{Lg} scale ==
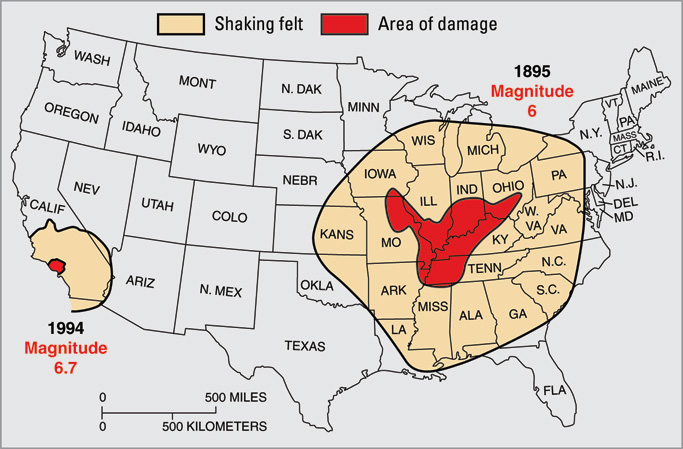
Differences in the crust underlying North America east of the Rocky Mountains makes that area more sensitive to earthquakes. Shown here: the 1895 New Madrid earthquake, M ~6, was felt through most of the central U.S., while the 1994 Northridge quake, though almost ten times stronger at M 6.7, was felt only in southern California. From USGS Fact Sheet 017–03.

The regional mb_{Lg} scale – also denoted mb_Lg, mbLg, MLg (USGS), Mn, and m_{N} – was developed by Nuttli (1973) for a problem the original M_{L} scale could not handle: all of North America east of the Rocky Mountains. The M_{L} scale was developed in southern California, which lies on blocks of oceanic crust, typically basalt or sedimentary rock, which have been accreted to the continent. East of the Rockies the continent is a craton, a thick and largely stable mass of continental crust that is largely granite, a harder rock with different seismic characteristics. In this area the M_{L} scale gives anomalous results for earthquakes which by other measures seemed equivalent to quakes in California.

Nuttli resolved this by measuring the amplitude of short-period (~1 sec.) Lg waves, a complex form of the Love wave which, although a surface wave, he found provided a result more closely related to the mb scale than the M_{s} scale. Lg waves attenuate quickly along any oceanic path, but propagate well through the granitic continental crust, and Mb_{Lg} is often used in areas of stable continental crust; it is especially useful for detecting underground nuclear explosions.

== Sources ==
- Abe, K. (April 1979), "Size of great earthquakes of 1837 – 1874 inferred from tsunami data", Journal of Geophysical Research, 84 (B4): 1561–1568, Bibcode:1979JGR....84.1561A, doi:10.1029/JB084iB04p01561.
- Abe, K. (October 1981), "Magnitudes of large shallow earthquakes from 1904 to 1980", Physics of the Earth and Planetary Interiors, 27 (1): 72–92, Bibcode:1981PEPI...27...72A, doi:10.1016/0031-9201(81)90088-1.
- Abe, K. (September 1989), "Quantification of tsunamigenic earthquakes by the M_{t} scale", Tectonophysics, 166 (1–3): 27–34, Bibcode:1989Tectp.166...27A, doi:10.1016/0040-1951(89)90202-3.
- Abe, K; Noguchi, S. (August 1983), "Revision of magnitudes of large shallow earthquakes, 1897-1912", Physics of the Earth and Planetary Interiors, 33 (1): 1–11, Bibcode:1983PEPI...33....1A, doi:10.1016/0031-9201(83)90002-X.
- Anderson, J. G. (2003), "Chapter 57: Strong-Motion Seismology", International Handbook of Earthquake & Engineering Seismology, Part B, Elsevier, pp. 937–966, ISBN 0-12-440658-0.
- Bindi, D.; Parolai, S.; Oth, K.; Abdrakhmatov, A.; Muraliev, A.; Zschau, J. (October 2011), "Intensity prediction equations for Central Asia", Geophysical Journal International, 187 (1): 327–337, Bibcode:2011GeoJI.187..327B, doi:10.1111/j.1365-246X.2011.05142.x.
- Blackford, M. E. (1984), "Use of the Abe magnitude scale by the Tsunami Warning System." (PDF), Science of Tsunami Hazards, 2 (1): 27–30.
- Bolt, B. A. (1993), Earthquakes and geological discovery, Scientific American Library, ISBN 0-7167-5040-6.
- Bormann, Peter (2012), Bormann, P. (ed.), New Manual of Seismological Observatory Practice 2 (NMSOP-2), Potsdam: IASPEI/GFZ German Research Centre for Geosciences, doi:10.2312/GFZ.NMSOP-2.
- Bormann, P. (2012), "Data Sheet 3.1: Magnitude calibration formulas and tables, comments on their use and complementary data.", in Bormann (ed.), New Manual of Seismological Observatory Practice 2 (NMSOP-2), doi:10.2312/GFZ.NMSOP-2_DS_3.1, archived from the original (PDF) on 2019-08-04.
- Bormann, P. (2012), "Exercise 3.1: Magnitude determinations", in Bormann (ed.), New Manual of Seismological Observatory Practice 2 (NMSOP-2), doi:10.2312/GFZ.NMSOP-2_EX_3.1, archived from the original (PDF) on 2019-08-04.
- Bormann, P. (2013), "Information Sheet 3.2: Proposal for unique magnitude and amplitude nomenclature", in Bormann (ed.), New Manual of Seismological Observatory Practice 2 (NMSOP-2), doi:10.2312/GFZ.NMSOP-2_IS_3.3, archived from the original (PDF) on 2019-08-04.
- Bormann, P.; Dewey, J. W. (2014), "Information Sheet 3.3: The new IASPEI standards for determining magnitudes from digital data and their relation to classical magnitudes.", in Bormann (ed.), New Manual of Seismological Observatory Practice 2 (NMSOP-2), doi:10.2312/GFZ.NMSOP-2_IS_3.3, archived from the original (PDF) on 2019-08-04.
- Bormann, P.; Fugita, K.; MacKey, K. G.; Gusev, A. (July 2012), "Information Sheet 3.7: The Russian K-class system, its relationships to magnitudes and its potential for future development and application", in Bormann (ed.), New Manual of Seismological Observatory Practice 2 (NMSOP-2), doi:10.2312/GFZ.NMSOP-2_IS_3.7, archived from the original (PDF) on 2019-08-04.
- Bormann, P.; Saul, J. (2009), "Earthquake Magnitude" (PDF), Encyclopedia of Complexity and Applied Systems Science, vol. 3, pp. 2473–2496.
- Bormann, P.; Wendt, S.; Di Giacomo, D. (2013), "Chapter 3: Seismic Sources and Source Parameters", in Bormann (ed.), New Manual of Seismological Observatory Practice 2 (NMSOP-2), doi:10.2312/GFZ.NMSOP-2_ch3, archived from the original (PDF) on 2019-08-04.
- Chen, T. C.; Pomeroy, P. W. (1980), Regional Seismic Wave Propagation.
- Choy, G. L.; Boatwright, J. L. (2012), "Information Sheet 3.6: Radiated seismic energy and energy magnitude", in Bormann (ed.), New Manual of Seismological Observatory Practice 2 (NMSOP-2), doi:10.2312/GFZ.NMSOP-2_IS_3.6, archived from the original (PDF) on 2019-08-04.
- Choy, G. L.; Boatwright, J. L.; Kirby, S. (2001), "The Radiated Seismic Energy and Apparent Stress of Interplate and Intraslab Earthquakes at Subduction Zone Environments: Implications for Seismic Hazard Estimation" (PDF), U.S. Geological Survey, Open-File Report 01-0005.
- Chung, D. H.; Bernreuter, D. L. (1980), Regional Relationships Among Earthquake Magnitude Scales., doi:10.2172/5073993, OSTI 5073993, NUREG/CR-1457.
- Doi, K. (2010), "Operational Procedures of Contributing Agencies" (PDF), Bulletin of the International Seismological Centre, 47 (7–12): 25, ISSN 2309-236X, archived from the original (PDF) on 2022-01-20. Also available here (sections renumbered).
- Engdahl, E. R.; Villaseñor, A. (2002), "Chapter 41: Global Seismicity: 1900–1999" (PDF), in Lee, W.H.K.; Kanamori, H.; Jennings, P.C.; Kisslinger, C. (eds.), International Handbook of Earthquake and Engineering Seismology, vol. Part A, Academic Press, pp. 665–690, ISBN 0-12-440652-1.
- Frankel, A. (1994), "Implications of felt area-magnitude relations for earthquake scaling and the average frequency of perceptible ground motion", Bulletin of the Seismological Society of America, 84 (2): 462–465.
- Grünthal, G. (2011), "Earthquakes, Intensity", in Gupta, H. (ed.), Encyclopedia of Solid Earth Geophysics, pp. 237–242, ISBN 978-90-481-8701-0.
- Gutenberg, B. (January 1945a), "Amplitudes of surface Waves and magnitudes of shallow earthquakes" (PDF), Bulletin of the Seismological Society of America, 35 (1): 3–12, Bibcode:1945BuSSA..35....3G, doi:10.1785/BSSA0350010003.
- Gutenberg, B. (1 April 1945c), "Magnitude determination for deep-focus earthquakes" (PDF), Bulletin of the Seismological Society of America, 35 (3): 117–130, Bibcode:1945BuSSA..35..117G, doi:10.1785/BSSA0350030117
- Gutenberg, B.; Richter, C. F. (1936), "On seismic waves (third paper)", Gerlands Beiträge zur Geophysik, 47: 73–131.
- Gutenberg, B.; Richter, C. F. (1942), "Earthquake magnitude, intensity, energy, and acceleration", Bulletin of the Seismological Society of America, 32 (3): 163–191, Bibcode:1942BuSSA..32..163G, doi:10.1785/BSSA0320030163, ISSN 0037-1106.
- Gutenberg, B.; Richter, C. F. (1954), Seismicity of the Earth and Associated Phenomena (2nd ed.), Princeton University Press, 310p.
- Gutenberg, B.; Richter, C. F. (1956), "Magnitude and energy of earthquakes" (PDF), Annali di Geofisica, 9: 1–15
- Havskov, J.; Ottemöller, L. (October 2009). "Processing Earthquake Data" (PDF). FTP server (FTP). (To view documents see Help:FTP).
- Hough, S.E. (2007), Richter's scale: measure of an earthquake, measure of a man, Princeton University Press, ISBN 978-0-691-12807-8.
- Hutton, L. K.; Boore, David M. (December 1987), "The M_{L} scale in Southern California" (PDF), Nature, 271 (5644): 411–414, Bibcode:1978Natur.271..411K, doi:10.1038/271411a0, S2CID 4185100.
- Hutton, Kate; Woessner, Jochen; Haukson, Egill (April 2010), "Earthquake Monitoring in Southern California for Seventy-Seven Years (1932—2008)" (PDF), Bulletin of the Seismological Society of America, 100 (1): 423–446, Bibcode:2010BuSSA.100..423H, doi:10.1785/0120090130
- Johnston, A. (1996), "Seismic moment assessment of earthquakes in stable continental regions – II. Historical seismicity", Geophysical Journal International, 125 (3): 639–678, Bibcode:1996GeoJI.125..639J, doi:10.1111/j.1365-246x.1996.tb06015.x.
- Kanamori, H. (July 10, 1977), "The energy release in great earthquakes" (PDF), Journal of Geophysical Research, 82 (20): 2981–2987, Bibcode:1977JGR....82.2981K, doi:10.1029/JB082i020p02981.
- Kanamori, H. (April 1983), "Magnitude Scale and Quantification of Earthquake" (PDF), Tectonophysics, 93 (3–4): 185–199, Bibcode:1983Tectp..93..185K, doi:10.1016/0040-1951(83)90273-1.
- Katsumata, A. (June 1996), "Comparison of magnitudes estimated by the Japan Meteorological Agency with moment magnitudes for intermediate and deep earthquakes.", Bulletin of the Seismological Society of America, 86 (3): 832–842, Bibcode:1996BuSSA..86..832K, doi:10.1785/BSSA0860030832, S2CID 130279928.
- Makris, N.; Black, C. J. (September 2004), "Evaluation of Peak Ground Velocity as a "Good" Intensity Measure for Near-Source Ground Motions", Journal of Engineering Mechanics, 130 (9): 1032–1044, doi:10.1061/(asce)0733-9399(2004)130:9(1032).
- Musson, R. M.; Cecić, I. (2012), "Chapter 12: Intensity and Intensity Scales", in Bormann (ed.), New Manual of Seismological Observatory Practice 2 (NMSOP-2), doi:10.2312/GFZ.NMSOP-2_ch12, archived from the original (PDF) on 2019-08-04.
- Nuttli, O. W. (10 February 1973), "Seismic wave attenuation and magnitude relations for eastern North America", Journal of Geophysical Research, 78 (5): 876–885, Bibcode:1973JGR....78..876N, doi:10.1029/JB078i005p00876.
- Nuttli, O. W. (April 1983), "Average seismic source-parameter relations for mid-plate earthquakes", Bulletin of the Seismological Society of America, 73 (2): 519–535.
- Rautian, T. G.; Khalturin, V. I.; Fujita, K.; Mackey, K. G.; Kendall, A. D. (November–December 2007), "Origins and Methodology of the Russian Energy K-Class System and Its Relationship to Magnitude Scales" (PDF), Seismological Research Letters, 78 (6): 579–590, Bibcode:2007SeiRL..78..579R, doi:10.1785/gssrl.78.6.579.
- Rautian, T.; Leith, W. S. (September 2002), "Developing Composite Regional Catalogs of the Seismicity of the Former Soviet Union." (PDF), 24th Seismic Research Review – Nuclear Explosion Monitoring: Innovation and Integration, Ponte Vedra Beach, Florida.
- Richter, C. F. (January 1935), "An Instrumental Earthquake Magnitude Scale" (PDF), Bulletin of the Seismological Society of America, 25 (1): 1–32, Bibcode:1935BuSSA..25....1R, doi:10.1785/BSSA0250010001, archived from the original (PDF) on 2018-07-10.
- Spence, W.; Sipkin, S. A.; Choy, G. L. (1989), "Measuring the size of an Earthquake" (PDF), Earthquakes and Volcanoes, 21 (1): 58–63.
- Stover, C. W.; Coffman, J. L. (1993), Seismicity of the United States, 1568–1989 (Revised) (PDF), U.S. Geological Survey Professional Paper 1527.
