= 1950 Assam–Tibet earthquake =

1950 earthquake centered on border between Tibet, China and Assam, India

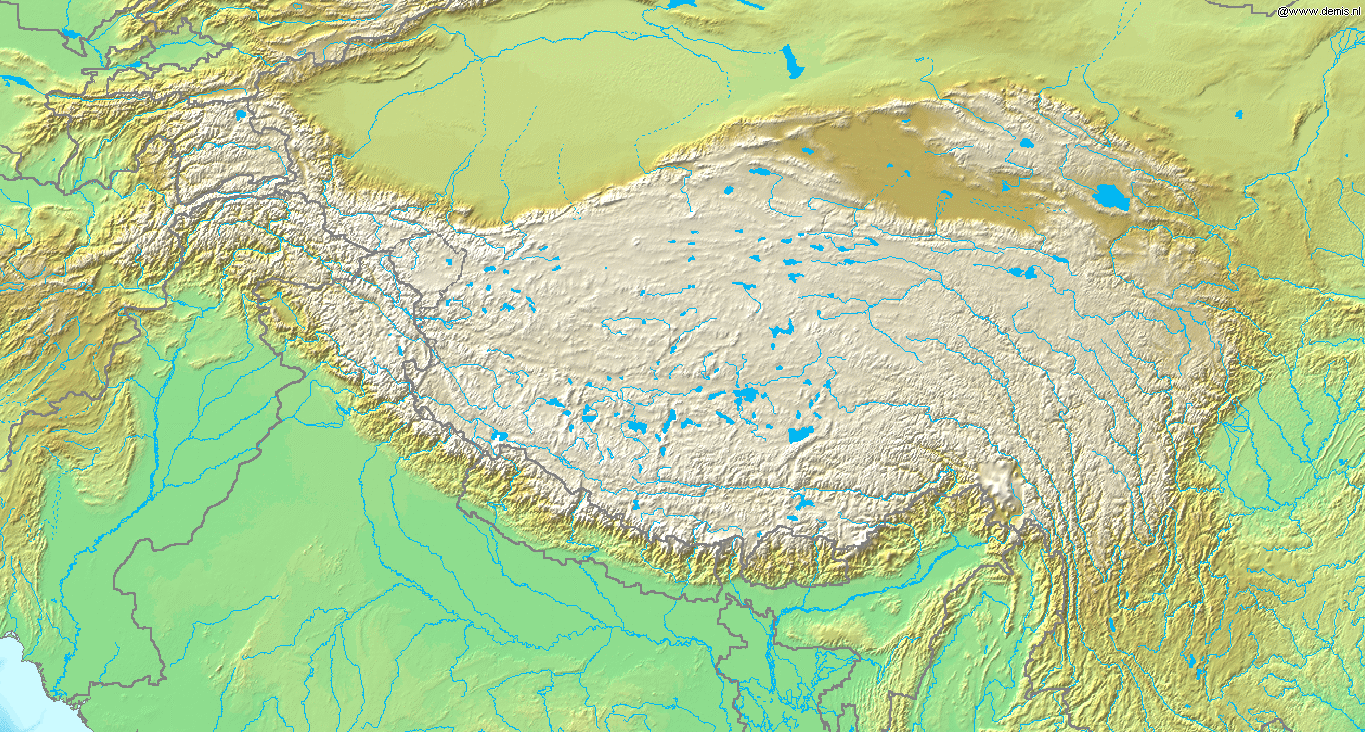
- Location within Tibetan Plateau
- UTC time: 1950-08-15 14:09:34
- ISC event: 895681
- USGS-ANSS: ComCat
- Local date: August 15, 1950
- Local time: 19:39:34 IST
- Magnitude: M_{w} 8.7
- Depth: 15 km (9.3 mi)
- Epicenter: 28.36°N 96.45°E
- Fault: Main Himalayan Thrust
- Type: Oblique-slip
- Areas affected: Assam, India; Tibet, China
- Max. intensity: MMI XI (Extreme)
- Casualties: 4,800 dead

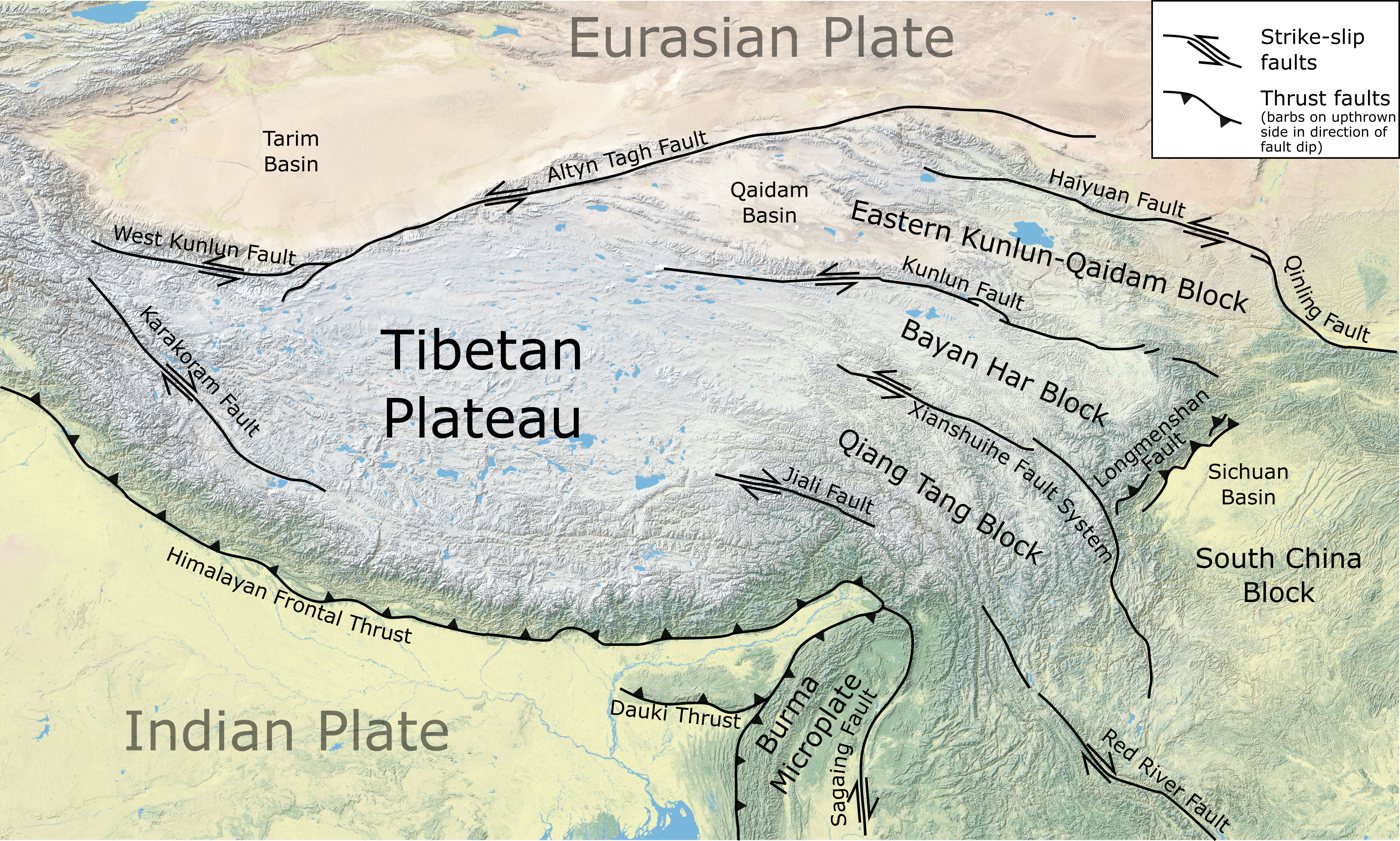
Main faults of the Himalayas/Tibetan Plateau

The 1950 Assam–Tibet earthquake, also known as the Assam earthquake, occurred on 15 August and had a moment magnitude of 8.7. The epicentre was located in the Mishmi Hills. It is one of the strongest earthquakes ever recorded on land.

Occurring on a Tuesday at 7:39 PM Indian Standard Time, the earthquake was destructive in both Assam (India) and Tibet (China), and approximately 4,800 people were killed. The earthquake is notable as being the largest recorded quake caused by continental collision rather than subduction, and is also notable for the loud noises produced by the quake and reported throughout the region.

== Tectonic setting ==
Northeastern India and southern Tibet lie in the frontal part of the zone of collision between the northward moving Indian plate and Eurasia. The thrust belt that marks this plate boundary zone is formed of a series of sub-parallel thrust faults. The thrust faults in this part of the Himalayas show a rapid lateral change in orientation from SW-NE trending to NW-SE trending in the area of the Namche–Barwa syntaxis. To the west the main active part of the thrust belt is the Himalayan (or Main) Frontal Thrust, which joins the Main Himalayan Thrust at depth. To the east the active frontal structure is the Mishmi Thrust, which connects to the south with the Naga Thrust and the left-lateral strike-slip Sagaing Fault that together bound the Burma Microplate.

=== Past seismicity ===
In an attempt to further uncover the seismic history of Northeast India, field studies were conducted by scientists with the National Geophysical Research Institute and Institute of Physics, Bhubaneswar. The study discovered signs of soil liquefaction including sills and sand volcanoes inside at least twelve trenches in alluvial fans and on the Burhi Dihing River Valley that were formed by past seismic activity. Radiocarbon dating identified the deposits at roughly 500 years old, which would correspond with a recorded earthquake in 1548.

== Earthquake ==
The earthquake had an epicenter in the Mishmi Hills to the northeast of the surface trace of the Mishmi Thrust Fault. Magnitudes calculated for the earthquake range from M_{w} 8.6–8.8, making it the largest onshore earthquake ever recorded and the largest not associated with subduction. It was the sixth largest earthquake of the 20th century.

Aftershocks were numerous; many of them were of magnitude 6 and over and well enough recorded at distant stations for reasonably good epicentre location. The aftershock epicenters covered a very large area over the Abor and Mishmi Hills of about 30,000 km^{2}, which matches well with the area of maximum shaking as determined from the location of landslides from satellite imagery. This is interpreted to define the rupture area.

Evidence for surface rupture was discovered at multiple locations along the trace of the Abor Hills section of the Main Frontal Thrust (MFT) and along the Mishmi Thrust (MT). The total observed surface rupture length along both faults is ≥ 200 km.

Published focal mechanisms for this earthquake are contradictory with both thrust and strike-slip mechanisms supported. It has been proposed that the earthquake ruptured both the northwest-dipping MFT and the northeast-dipping MT. This combined source, being oblique thrust in nature, provides a good fit with observations of seismic arrivals. The average slip values on MT and MFT are 17 ± 1 m and 11 ± 1 m respectively, with an amount as high as 34 ± 2.5 m implied to have happened underneath Wakro in the former fault. Together with the calculated rupture area of 330 × 90 km and a reasonable estimate for the crustal rigidity, this gives a moment magnitude of 8.7.

== Impact ==
The 1950 Assam–Tibet earthquake had devastating effects on both Assam and Tibet. In Assam, 1,526 fatalities were recorded and another 3,300 were reported in Tibet for a total of approximately 4,800 deaths.

Alterations of relief were brought about by many rock falls in the Mishmi Hills and surrounding forested regions. In the Abor Hills, 70 villages were destroyed with 156 casualties due to landslides. Landslides blocked the tributaries of the Brahmaputra. In the Dibang Valley, a landslide lake burst without causing damage, but another at Subansiri River opened after an interval of 8 days and the wave, 7 m (23 ft) high, submerged several villages and killed 532 people.

The shock was more damaging in Assam, in terms of property loss, than the earthquake of 1897. In addition to the extreme shaking, there were floods when the rivers rose high after the earthquake bringing down sand, mud, trees, and all kinds of debris. Pilots flying over the meizoseismal area reported great changes in topography. This was largely due to enormous landslides, some of which were photographed.

In Tibet, Heinrich Harrer reported strong shaking in Lhasa and loud cracking noises from the earth. Aftershocks were felt in Lhasa for days. In Rima, Tibet (modern-day Zayü Town), Frank Kingdon-Ward, noted violent shaking, extensive slides, and the rise of the streams. Helen Myers Morse, an American missionary living in Putao, northern Burma at the time, wrote letters home describing the main shake, the numerous aftershocks, and of the noise coming out of the earth.

One of the more westerly aftershocks, a few days later, was felt more extensively in Assam than the main shock. This led certain journalists to the belief that the later shock was 'bigger' and must be the greatest earthquake of all time. This is a typical example of the confusion between the essential concepts of magnitude and intensity. The extraordinary sounds heard by Kingdon-Ward and many others at the times of the main earthquake have been specially investigated. Seiches were observed as far away as Norway and England.

== Future threat ==
An article in Science, published in response to the 2001 Bhuj earthquake, calculated that 70 percent of the Himalayas could experience an extremely powerful earthquake. The prediction came from research of the historical records from the area as well as the presumption that since the 1950 Medog earthquake enough slippage has taken place for a large earthquake to occur. In 2015, the Himalayas were hit by a 7.8-magnitude earthquake with an epicenter further west in Nepal.

== See also ==
- 1897 Assam earthquake
- 2009 Bhutan earthquake
- April 2015 Nepal earthquake
- List of earthquakes in 1950
- List of earthquakes in India
- List of earthquakes in China
