= 1869 Cachar earthquake =

Earthquake in India

- Location within India
- Local date: January 10, 1869
- Magnitude: 7.4 M_{w}
- Epicenter: 25.5°N 93.0°E
- Areas affected: India
- Total damage: Severe
- Max. intensity: EMS-98 VII (Damaging)
- Casualties: 2

The 1869 Cachar earthquake occurred on 10 January with an estimated moment magnitude of 7.4 and a maximum EMS-98 intensity of VII (Damaging). Two people were killed and damage was considered severe. The earthquake was felt in Upper Burma, Bihar, Jharkhand, Bengal and Northeast India.

== Earthquake ==
The cause is said to have been from a 32 kilometres (20 mi) long fissure below the Jaintia Hills, situated north of the Sylhet region.

Selected EMS-98 intensities
Intensity	Locations
VII (Damaging)	Silchar, Imphal
VI (Slightly damaging)	Golaghat, Sylhet
V (Strong)	Dhaka
IV (Largely observed)	Kolkata
III (Weak)	Hazaribagh
II (Scarcely felt)	Midnapore
Martin & Szeliga 2010

== See also ==
- List of historical earthquakes
- List of earthquakes in India
