= 2025 Myanmar earthquake =

Earthquake impacting Myanmar and Thailand

- ၂၀၂၅ မြန်မာ ငလျင်
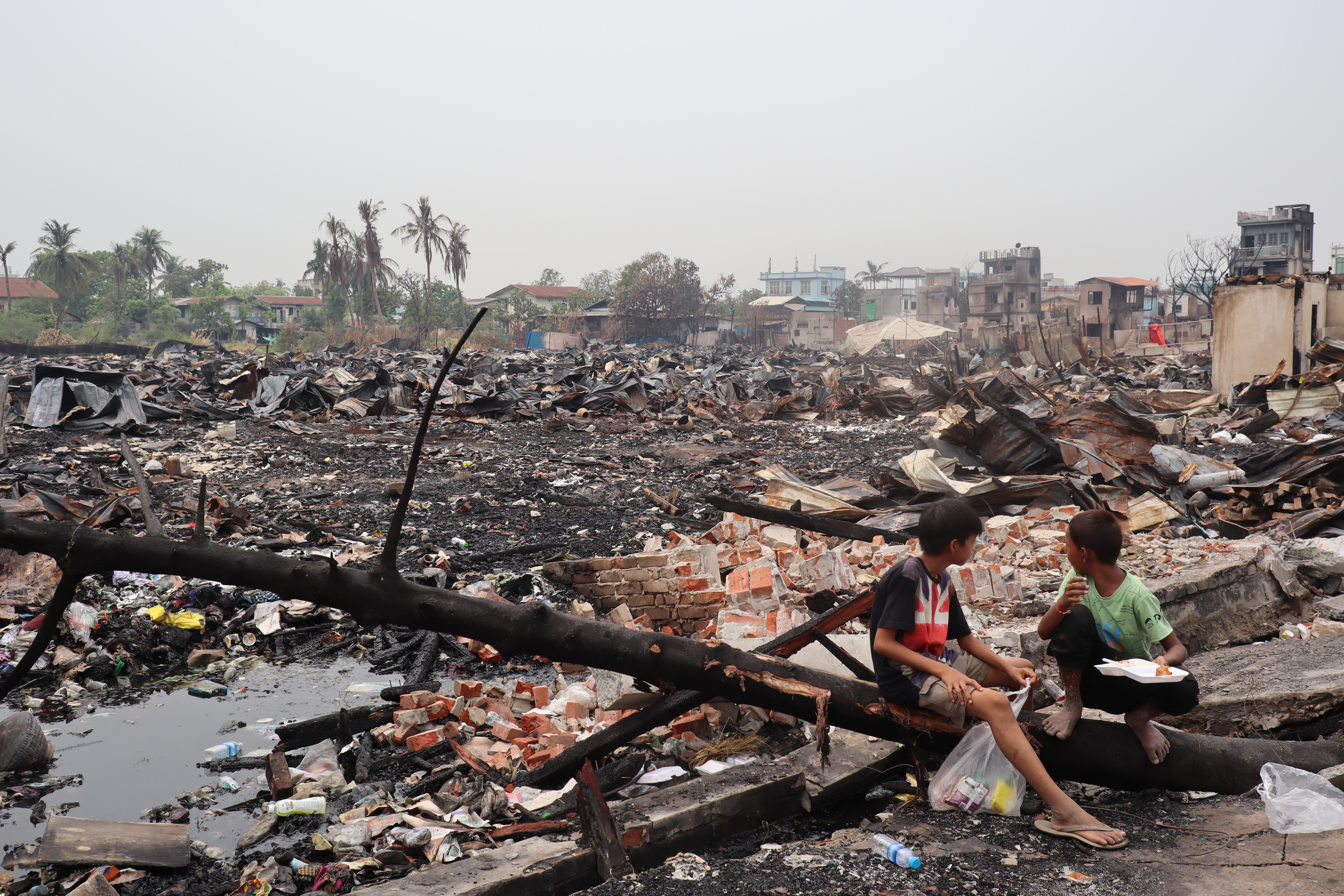
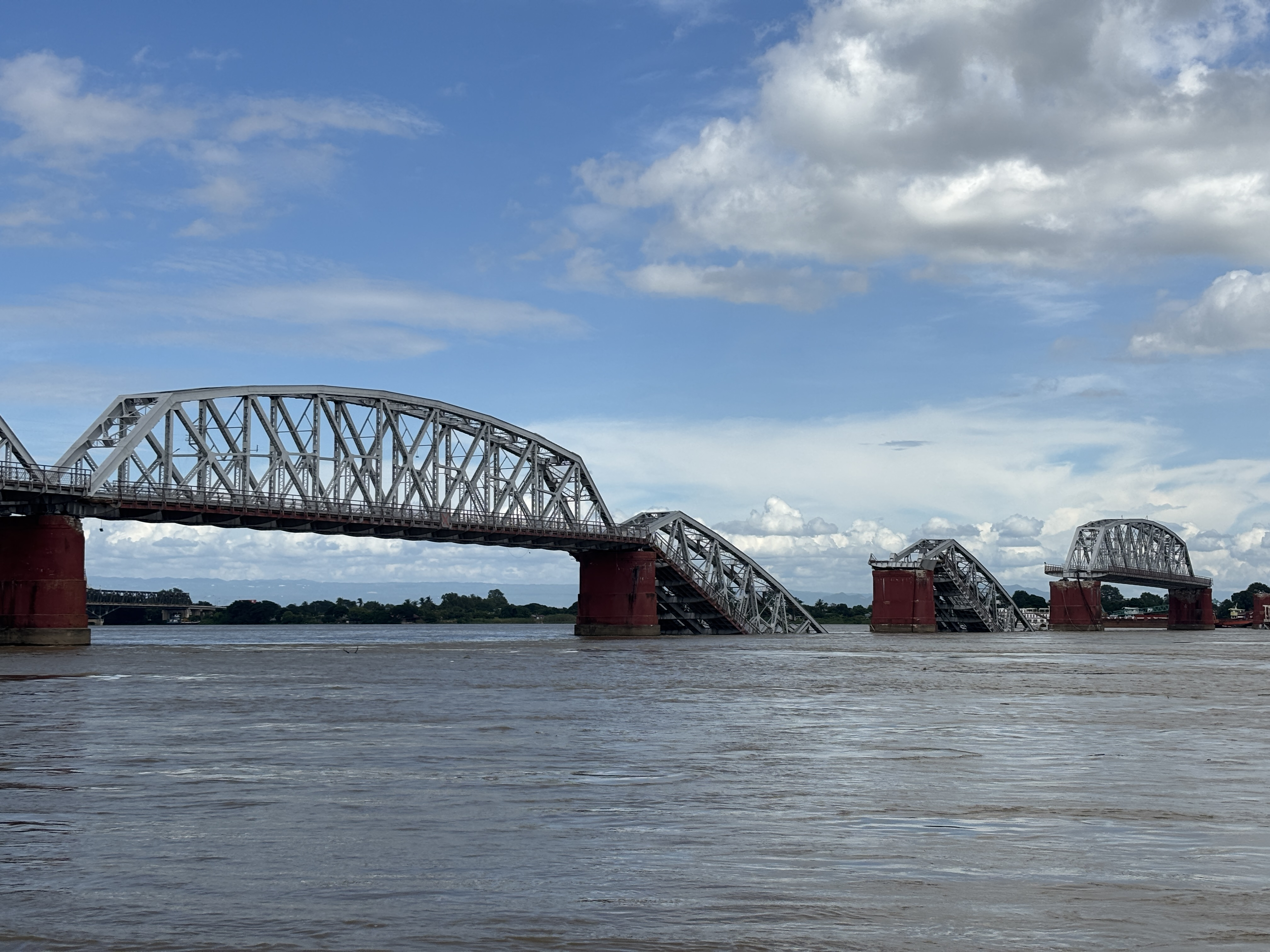
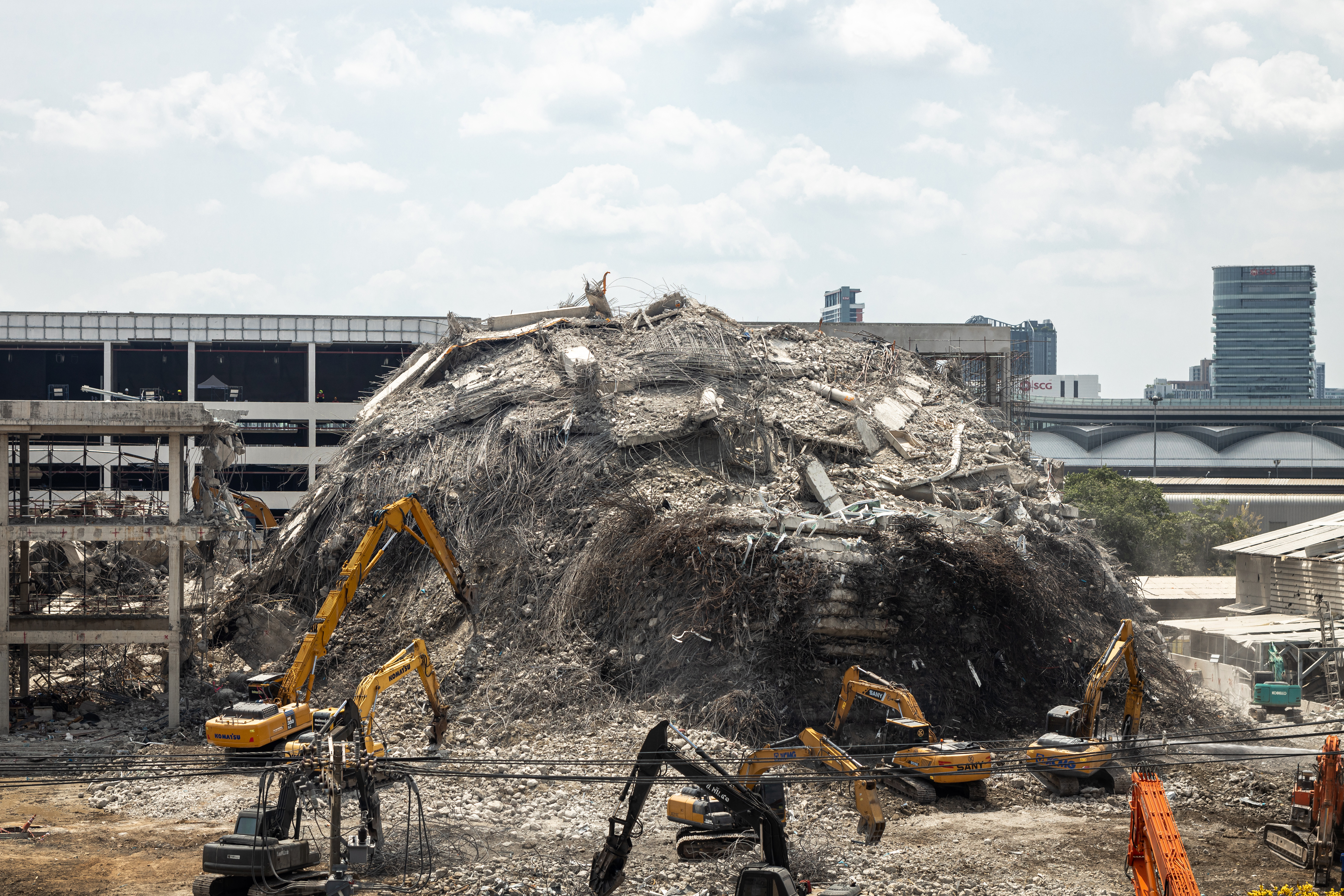
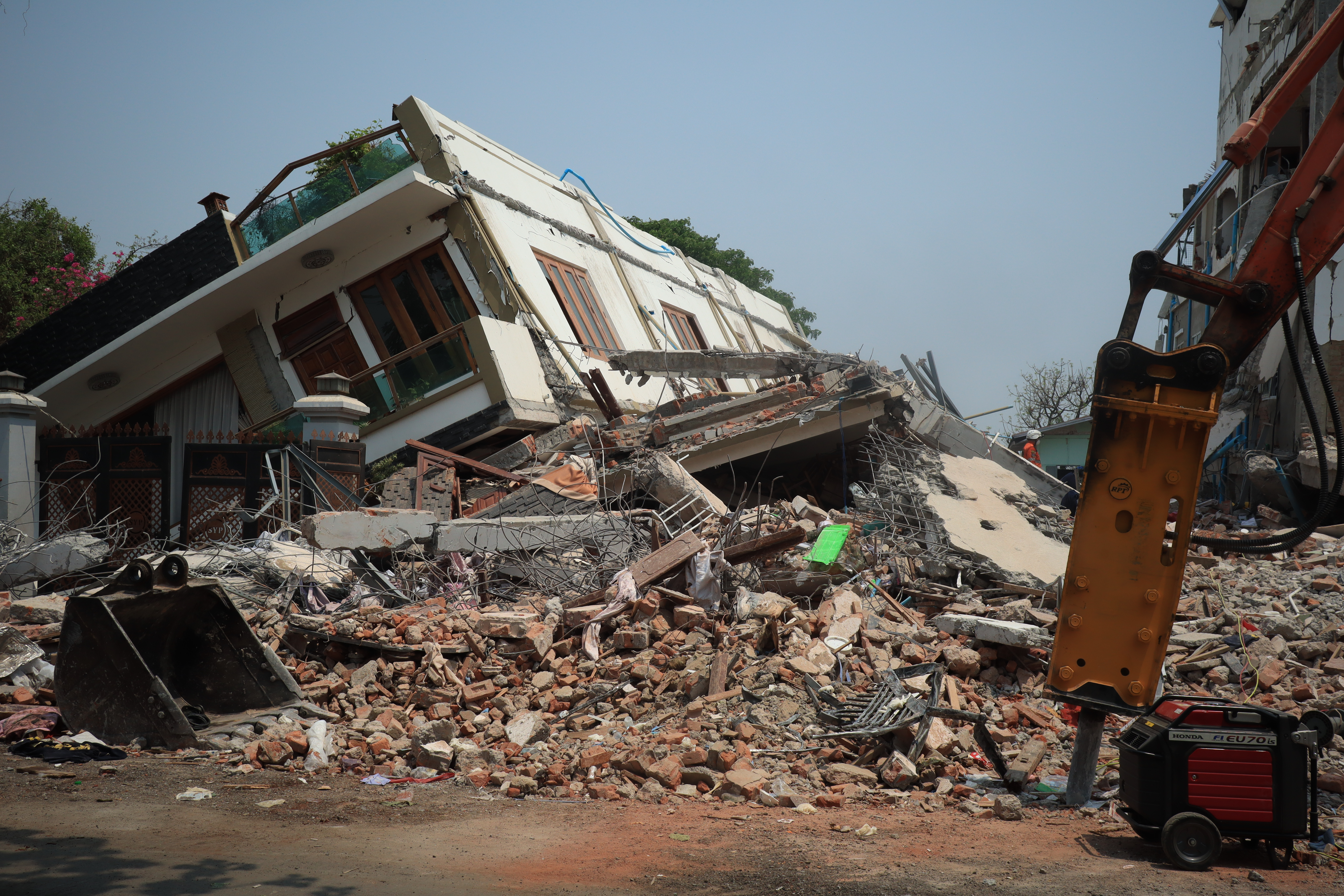
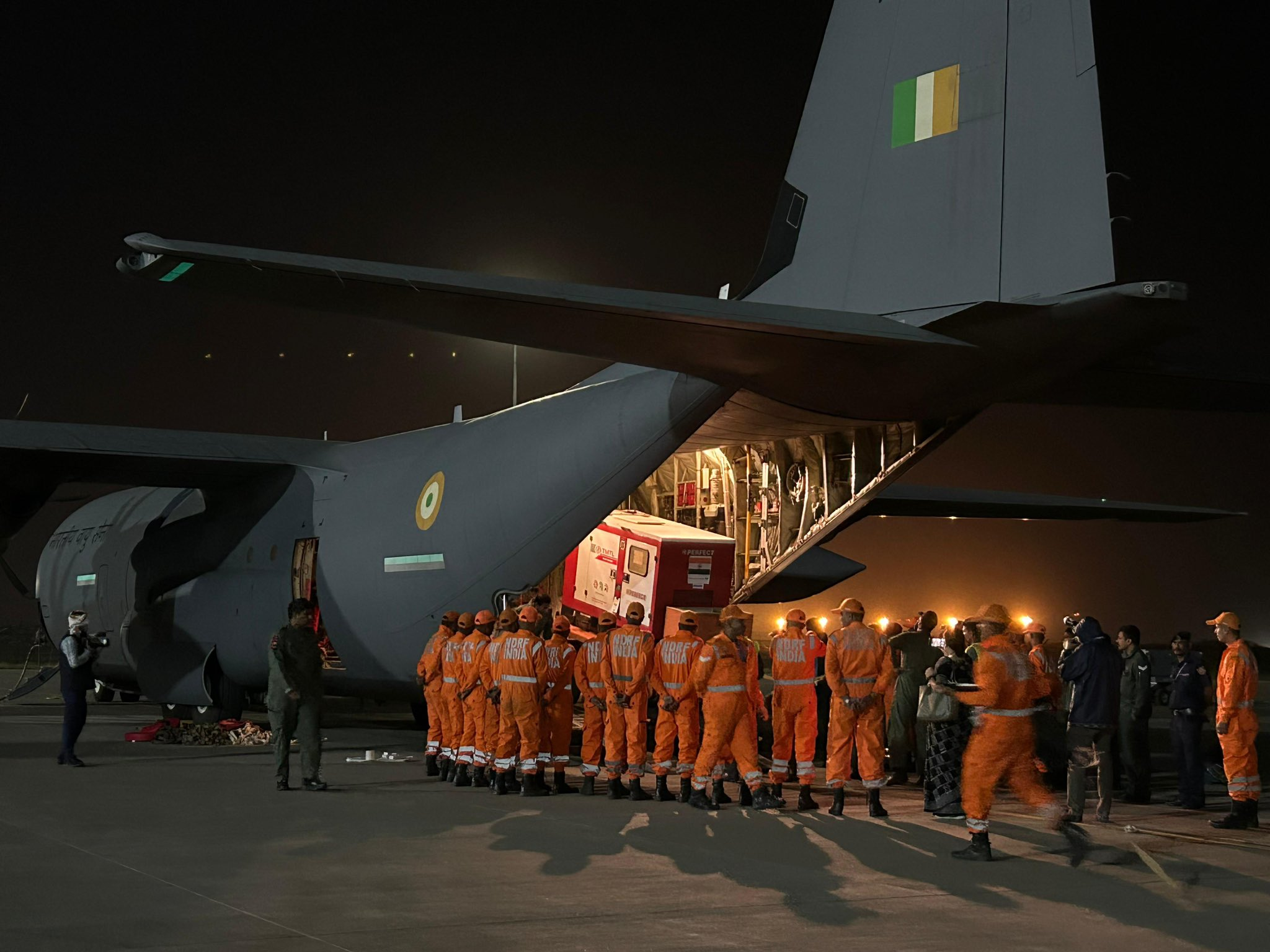
- From top, left to right: Neighbourhood in Mandalay ravaged by a fire; Collapsed Ava Bridge in Sagaing; The collapsed State Audit Office building in Bangkok; A collapsed building in Mandalay; Indian Air Force aircraft delivering aid, under Operation Brahma
- USGS ShakeMap
- UTC time: 2025-03-28 06:20:52
- ISC event: 643071319
- USGS-ANSS: ComCat
- Local date: 28 March 2025
- Local time: 12:50:52 MMT (UTC+6:30)
- Duration: 80 seconds (rupture process)
- Magnitude: M_{w} 7.7–7.9 M_{s} 7.9 M_{L} 8.2
- Depth: 10 km (6 mi)
- Epicenter: 22.001°N 95.925°E
- Fault: Sagaing Fault
- Type: Strike-slip, supershear
- Areas affected: Myanmar, Thailand, Southwestern China, Vietnam
- Total damage: US $11 billion
- Max. intensity: MMI X (Extreme)
- Peak acceleration: 1.07 g
- Peak velocity: 161.42 cm (63.55 in)/s
- Aftershocks: 500+ recorded (by July 2025); M_{w} 6.7 on 28 March 2025 (Strongest)
- Casualties: 5,456 fatalities 11,404 injured 538 missing

On 28 March 2025, at 12:50:52 MMT (06:20:52 UTC), a moment magnitude (M_{w}) 7.7–7.9 earthquake struck the Sagaing Region of Myanmar, with an epicenter close to Mandalay, the country's second-largest city. The shaking caused by this strike-slip shock reached a maximum Modified Mercalli intensity of X (Extreme). It was the most powerful earthquake to strike Myanmar since 1912, and the second deadliest in Myanmar's modern history, surpassed only by upper estimates of the 1930 Bago earthquake. The earthquake caused extensive damage in Myanmar, particularly in areas near the rupture, and significant damage in neighboring Thailand. Hundreds of homes were also damaged in Yunnan, China, while more than 400 apartments were affected in Ho Chi Minh City, Vietnam.

The earthquake directly killed up to 5,352 people in Myanmar and 103 in Thailand, while one person died from shock in Vietnam. Up to 11,404 people were injured and hundreds more were reported missing. Most of the fatalities in Thailand occurred at a collapsed construction site in Bangkok, whose shallow geology makes it more vulnerable to seismic waves from far away. Authorities in both Myanmar and Thailand declared a state of emergency. As the earthquake struck during Friday prayer hours, collapsing mosques resulted in the deaths of hundreds of Muslims. In addition, more than 8,300 monasteries, nunneries and pagodas were destroyed. The ongoing civil war in Myanmar exacerbated the difficulty of disaster relief and info exposure.

== Tectonic setting ==
The Sagaing Fault can be divided into segments

Myanmar is wedged between four tectonic plates (the Indian, Eurasian, Sunda, and Burma plates) that interact in active geological processes. Along the west coast of the Coco Islands, off the Rakhine coast, and into Bangladesh, is a highly oblique convergent boundary known as the Sunda megathrust. This large fault marks the boundary between the Indian and Burma plates. The megathrust emerges from the seafloor in Bangladesh, where it runs parallel and east of the Chin Hills. This boundary continues to the north of Myanmar where it ends at the eastern Himalayas.

A 1,400-kilometre (870 mi) transform fault runs through Myanmar and connects the Andaman spreading center to a collision zone in the north. Called the Sagaing Fault, it is a boundary between the Burma and Sunda plates as they slide past each other at 18–49 mm (0.71–1.93 in) per year. It is Myanmar's largest and most active source of earthquakes, running through or close to major cities including Yangon, Naypyidaw, and Mandalay. Large and damaging earthquakes occurred along the fault in May and December 1930 (M_{s} 7.3 & 7.5), 1931 (M_{s} 7.5), 1946 (M_{w} 7.3 & 7.7), 1956 (M_{w} 7.1), 1991 (M_{w} 6.8) and 2012 (M_{w} 6.9). The magnitudes of earthquakes on the Sagaing Fault vary across the fault zone from M_{w} 7.0 to 8.0. The recurrence interval also varies depending on the location along the fault; its southern segments, which ruptured in 1930, have return periods of 100–150 years based on paleoseismological studies.

Destructive earthquakes have affected the area for centuries, but academic research has been limited. Most earthquakes in Myanmar, including large surface rupturing events, are thus not well understood. A large M_{w} 8.5–8.8 earthquake in 1762 ruptured a section of the Sunda megathrust off the Rakhine coast. That earthquake may have been caused by the Indian plate subducting beneath the Burma plate along the megathrust. Remnants of the subducted Indian plate beneath central Myanmar also cause intraslab earthquakes; one example is the 1975 Bagan earthquake (M_{w} 7.0) which occurred at a depth of 120 km (75 mi).

According to a study published in Journal of Geophysical Research: Solid Earth, the Sagaing Fault can be divided into two regions: the northern and southern sections. The Sagaing Fault between 16.5 and 23.5 degrees north latitude is defined as the southern section. It is further divided into five segments from south to north: the Bago, Pyu, Naypyidaw, Meiktila, and Sagaing segments. The Naypyidaw segment is characterised by two parallel faults running for 70 km (43 mi) with parts of them located beneath the capital city, Naypyidaw. The last recorded earthquake was in 1929 with a magnitude smaller than 7.0. The 220 km (140 mi) long Meiktila segment extends between Mandalay and Naypyidaw and is characterised as a linear feature. The nearly flat topography across this segment suggest the slip component is entirely horizontal. This segment has not experienced any major earthquakes, although it possibly ruptured during the 1839 Ava earthquake. The Sagaing segment is also another linear segment that runs parallel to the Irrawaddy River. The northern part of this segment ruptured during one of the mainshocks in the 1946 Sagaing earthquakes, while the 1956 Sagaing earthquake ruptured the southern strand.

This earthquake also affected Thailand, with damage primarily concentrated in the Bangkok region, about 1,000 km (620 mi) away from the epicenter. Bangkok's geology, characterised by a top layer of soft marine clay, renders its emerging high-rises vulnerable to distant, powerful earthquakes, as the ubiquitous clay layer contributes to local site effects amplifying long-period ground motion which in turn can match the resonant frequency of tall buildings. Occupants in Bangkok have often felt effects from earthquakes centered many hundreds or even thousands of kilometres away. Research headed by Pennung Warnitchai of the Asian Institute of Technology had previously identified the Sagaing Fault as a potential risk, if a magnitude-8.0 earthquake were to occur in the Andaman Sea, 400 km (250 mi) from the city, resulting in a future disaster. For preventing catastrophic effects in skyscrapers, elementary seismic considerations were only added to the building code in 2007, with older structures being particularly dangerous.

== Earthquake ==
M_{w}7.7 finite fault

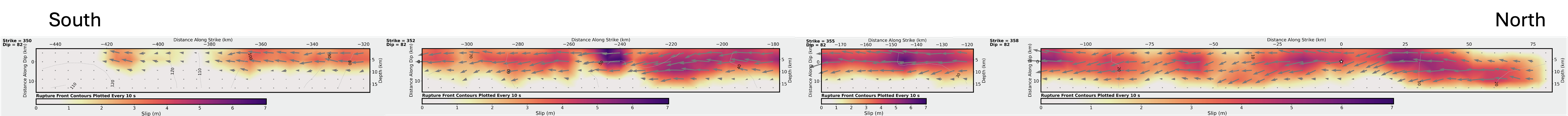
Distribution of slip across the rupture

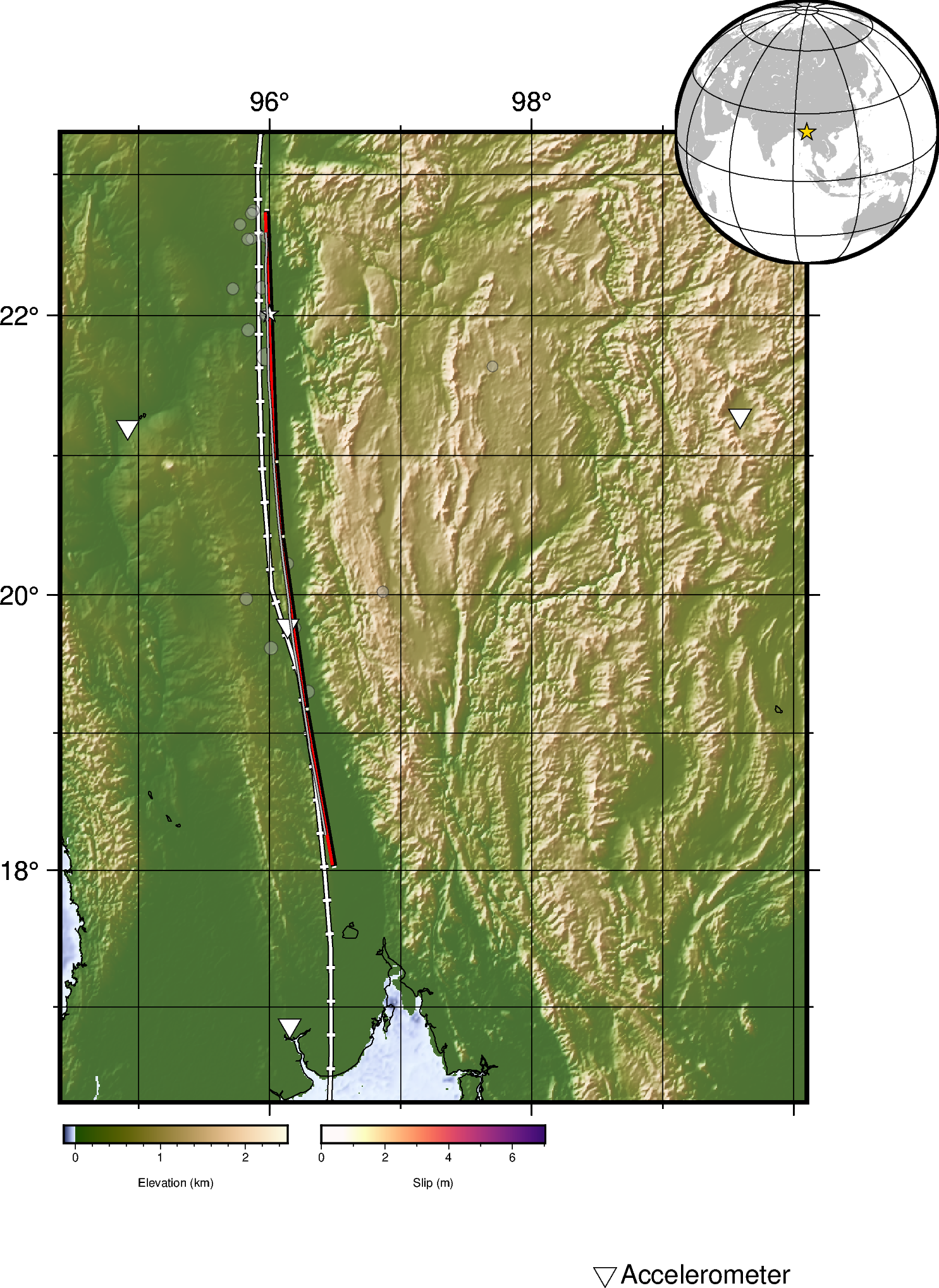
Surface projection of finite fault model

Main shock and aftershocks (map data)

The earthquake occurred at 12:50:52 MMT, with its epicenter located in Sagaing Township near the Sagaing–Mandalay border region, 14 km (8.7 mi) north-northwest of Sagaing city and 16 km (9.9 mi) west of Mandalay, Myanmar's second largest city. It measured 7.7 on the moment magnitude scale according to the United States Geological Survey (USGS), while the Thai Meteorological Department put the local magnitude (M_{L}) at 8.2. Institut de Physique du Globe de Paris placed the earthquake's moment magnitude at 7.9. The China Earthquake Administration recorded the earthquake at 7.9 on the surface-wave magnitude. It is the largest earthquake with an epicenter in Myanmar since the 1912 Maymyo earthquake (which had an M_{w} of 7.9). The focal mechanism solution indicated it occurred due to strike-slip faulting at a depth of 10 km (6.2 mi). The type of faulting is consistent with rupture on the Sagaing Fault.

The earthquake was followed by more than 468 aftershocks by 12 April, according to the Thai Meteorological Department. These aftershocks were recorded in Myanmar and nearby regions including 13 events between magnitude 5.0 and 5.9. There were also 21 aftershocks recorded in Mae Hong Son with magnitudes of 1.4 to 3.9. These aftershocks in Myanmar were distributed along a 400 km (250 mi) zone of the Sagaing Fault, though they were sparse along the central portion of the rupture. The largest aftershock measured M_{ww} 6.7 and occurred 12 minutes after the mainshock with a hypocenter beneath Mandalay International Airport. This aftershock also had a focal mechanism corresponding to strike-slip faulting.

=== Rupture process ===
Security camera footage of the rupture shifting the ground near Thazi, Myanmar

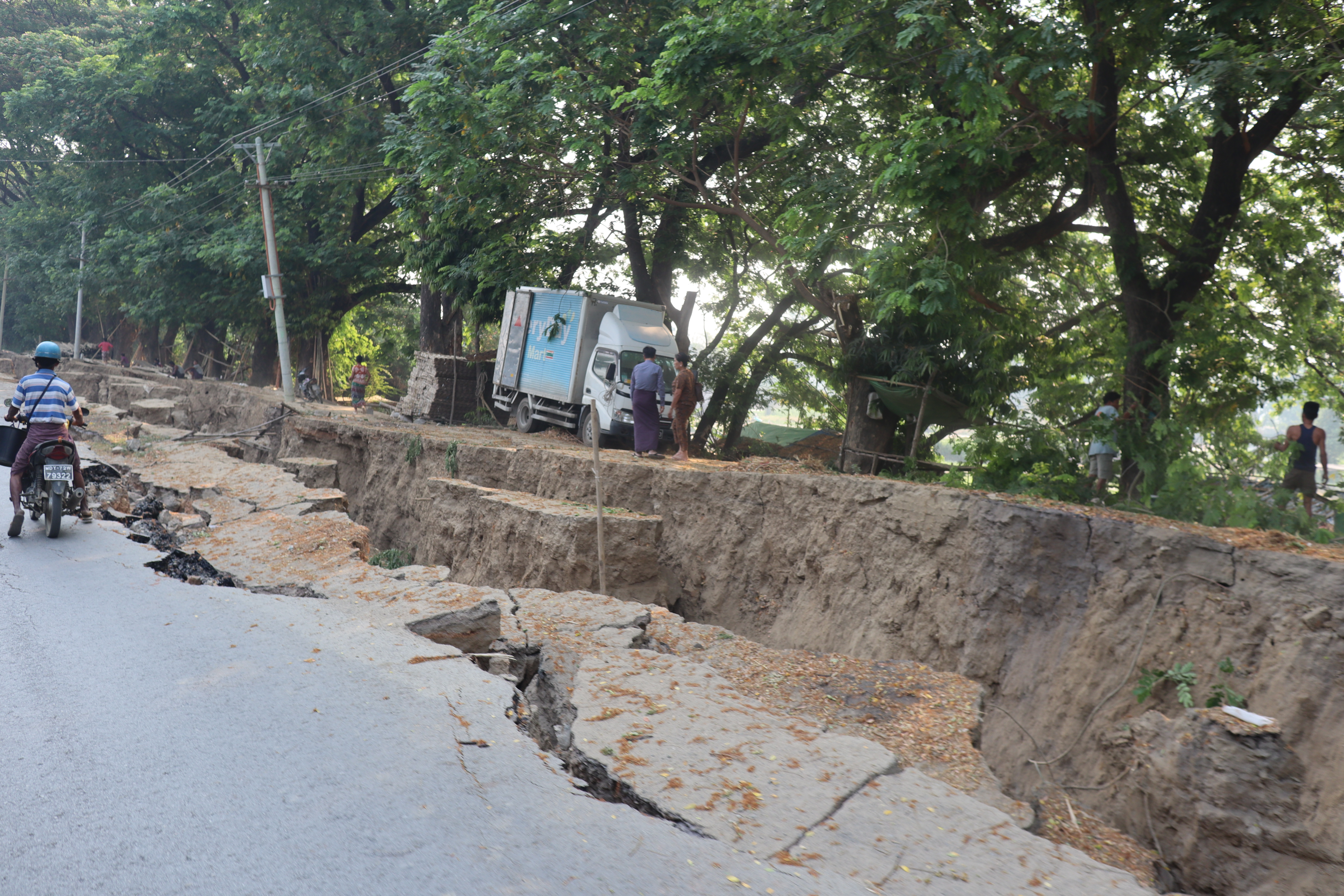
Lateral spreading in Sagaing

According to a finite fault model released by the USGS, the earthquake rupture extended about 500 km (310 mi) by 15 km (9.3 mi) from Singu in Mandalay to Kyauktaga in Bago. From the epicenter the rupture propagated more than 75 km (47 mi) to the north and terminated just north of Singu. More than 420 km (260 mi) of the rupture occurred to the south where it terminated near Kyauktaga. Slip of more than 1 m (3 ft 3 in) occurred non-uniformly across the entire rupture. Slip on the fault between Singu and Sagaing peaked at 5.7453 m (18.849 ft), while between Sagaing and Naypyidaw, generally exceeded 3 m (9.8 ft). Parts of the fault exhibit as much as 5–7 m (16–23 ft) of slip from Wundwin to Naypyidaw with the latter location experiencing the highest slip. South of Naypyidaw, the slip generally does not exceed 4 m (13 ft) and tapers off by Kyauktaga. The entire rupture process took about 85 seconds with the greatest phase of seismic moment release occurring 20 seconds after initiation. The rupture is thought to have propagated at speeds in excess of the shear wave velocity, making this an example of a supershear earthquake.

Italy's National Institute of Geophysics and Volcanology published their finite fault model comprising three north–south trending segments. They proposed that each segment produced a magnitude 7.5 and ruptured for a total length of 500 km (310 mi). The three segment ruptures corresponded in a cumulative moment magnitude of 7.8. According to their model, the earthquake produced a maximum slip of 7.4 m (24 ft) at a depth of 1.9 km (1.2 mi) along the central segment north of Naypyidaw. The earthquake produced one of the longest ruptures observed in the world, surpassing the lengths recorded by other large strike-slip events such as the 2002 Denali, 2009 Swan Islands, 2023 Turkey–Syria and 2013 Balochistan earthquakes.

=== Supershear rupture ===
The rupture associated with the mainshock is one of the longest sustained supershear event and fastest ever recorded, and longest fault rupture ever known (450–500 km (280–310 mi)). Based on empirical scaling relationships, the maximum expected rupture length for a strike-slip event of comparable magnitude is about 250 km (160 mi) only. Supershear rupture was inferred along the southern segment, although the extent along the fault where it occurred remains debated. Estimates range from 450 km (280 mi) based on back-projection imaging techniques to intermittent episodic supershear phases. The estimated rupture velocity also were as high as 6 km (3.7 mi) per second along the supershear segments.

=== Seismic gap ===
A 2011 study by Nobuo Hurukawa and Phyo Maung Maung in Geophysical Research Letters identified two seismic gaps along the Sagaing Fault. One of these gaps is located in central Myanmar between 19.2 degrees north and 21.5 degrees north, corresponding to the Meiktila segment. The pair concluded that this 260 km (160 mi) gap could produce a magnitude 7.9 earthquake if it completely ruptures. The Meiktila and Sagaing segment (to the north) may have been the source of the 1839 Ava earthquake. It is believed to have ruptured 285–325 km (177–202 mi) of the fault on both segments. A study of the seismic intensity distribution suggest the estimated moment magnitude of the 1839 event was 7.9.

The 2025 earthquake ruptured the entire length of the Meiktila seismic gap, but also 160 km (99 mi) beyond to achieve its exceptionally long rupture length. The rupture propagated along the seismic gap, breaching its southern margin and overlapping the rupture areas of the 1929 event on the Naypyidaw segment and into the Pyu segment which produced the second earthquake of 1930 before terminating. In the north, the rupture extended about 60 km (37 mi) northwards from the hypocenter along the Sagaing segment. Here, it overlaps the 1956 and 1946 rupture zones before terminating at the southern extent of the 2012 earthquake. The 1929 rupture was reactivated in its entirety and the rupture continued about 50 to 100 km (31 to 62 mi) into the 1930 rupture zone in the south. The 1956 rupture zone was also reactivated along its full length together with about 30 km (19 mi) of the southern rupture extent of the 1946 earthquake.

=== Surface rupture ===
The earthquake generated an exceptionally long surface rupture measuring 500 km (310 mi) as confirmed by satellite observations. It extended from Kyaukmyaung, Sagaing to Penwegon, Bago. Throughout most of the rupture, slip at the surface exceeded 3 m (9.8 ft) while around the epicenter area, reached 4–5 m (13–16 ft). A study of satellite data at the Geospatial Information Authority of Japan revealed that up to 6 m (20 ft) of horizontal displacement occurred along the fault.

Geological teams from Myanmar conducted field surveys between 29 March and 23 April 2025 along several sections of the surface rupture zone. Further observations and measurements could not be made due to limited instruments available and security concerns amid the ongoing civil war. Field observations and high-resolution optical satellite (HRS) imagery indicated that ground displacements exceeded 3 m (9.8 ft) along the fault except along segments between Inwa and Mandalay International Airport, and south of Taungoo. Overall, the field measurements of ground displacement was smaller than measurements using high-resolution optical satellite, with each method obtaining a peak value of 4.6 m (15 ft) and 6.2 m (20 ft), respectively. A likely explanation is that a large portion of fault deformation was accommodated across a narrow region within the surrounding unconsolidated alluvial deposits at very shallow depth rather than entirely along the fault.

The section with the largest dextral offset was between Singu and Sagaing City, or south of Yelemaw village beginning at 22.15 degrees north latitude. There, measured offsets exceeded 5 m (16 ft), a dramatic increase from 2 m (6 ft 7 in) in the village immediately north. HRS imagery further suggested slip may have been more than 6 m (20 ft) along this section. The rupture zone was confined to a very narrow area no more than 5 m (16 ft) across and cuts along the western margin of the Sagaing Hills. From Yae Khar Lake to Sagaing City, the rupture appears on the western edge of a long valley between these locations. In Naypyidaw, slip was generally measured to be 1.2 to 2.9 m (3 ft 11 in to 9 ft 6 in) with 0.3–0.4 m (1 ft 0 in – 1 ft 4 in) of vertical displacement along a primary west-facing scarp. At nearby Myohla, the primary rupture is accompanied by a secondary one 200 m (660 ft) away and propagated beneath Chaung Ma Gyi Reservoir Dam near Naypyidaw, but damage to the structure was mainly due to liquefaction.

In urbanised areas, the rupture cuts beneath and offsets roads and buildings. The surface rupture zone is less visible between Inwa and Mandalay International Airport because visible offsets were limited suggesting the fault deformation was accommodated across a broad zone. Satellite data suggest a maximum of 3 m (9.8 ft) or more in fault deformation though it did not exceed that of the northern sections. There was limited offset but where visible, did not exceed 1.7 m (5 ft 7 in) and featured ground warping across a 10 m (33 ft) wide zone. The ruptures there had a en‐échelon Riedel shear pattern along a north‐northeast–south‐southwest‐trend.

The first video recording of fault slip at the surface was from a CCTV at a solar energy farm in Thazi, 120 km (75 mi) south of the epicenter between the Wundwin and Naypyidaw section. Motion on the fault lasted for about 1.3 ± 0.2 seconds and produced a dextral mole track rupture. An analysis of the video revealed 2.5 ± 0.5 m (8 ft 2 in ± 1 ft 8 in) of dextral slip and peak velocity of 3.2 ± 1.0 m (10.5 ± 3.3 ft) per second. Another analysis found that the western fault block slipped substantially by 2.2 m (7 ft 3 in), causing intense ground shaking on its corresponding side of the fault. The eastern block only slipped for a few centimeters, but the total offset relative to both blocks were 2.8 m (9 ft 2 in). Fault deformation was highly localized as it was restricted to within the 20 m (66 ft) wide fault zone. Additionally, the main slip during the rupture was slightly larger than its eventual final position as immediately following the slip pulse. After achieving temporary peak displacement, the fault blocks jumped back slightly to settle into a permanent position.

South of Taungoo, the rupture was also less pronounced as it runs along the eastern flank of the Bago‐Yoma Range. Around Baw Di Gone (18.8 degrees north latitude), slip was 1.2 m (3 ft 11 in) whereas 4.7 km (2.9 mi) south, the slip dropped to 0.3 m (1 ft 0 in). Further south along the rupture, the amount of slip reduced until southeast of Kun Chaung Reservoir, it cannot be measured. Despite the absence of measurable surface offset, Sentinel‐2 observations indicate the rupture could be traced another 23 km (14 mi) south, and west of Pyu, about 1 m (3 ft 3 in) offset was inferred. This was 0.7–0.8 m (2 ft 4 in – 2 ft 7 in) larger than the measured offset suggesting broad surface warping and diffusive deformation near the rupture. Also west of the city, ground fissures and tension cracks appeared in rice fields without any displacement. Although no ruptures were observed beyond 18.15 degrees north latitude, there was liquefaction effects such as sand blows and cracks.

=== Intensity ===
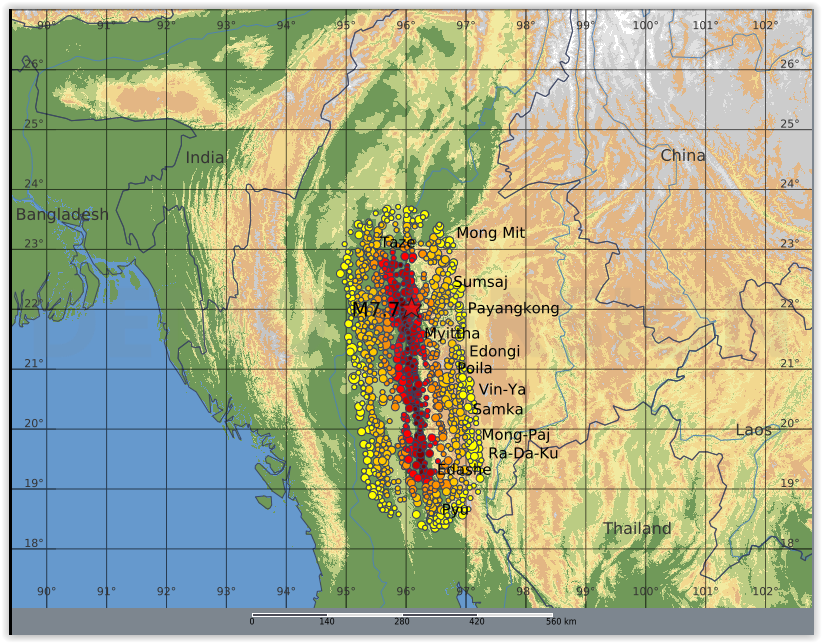
Map showing estimated degree of damage (black to yellow) in settlements marked as dots.

A GFZ seismic station in Naypyidaw recorded a vertical peak ground acceleration (pga) of 1.0656 g. The seismic installation recorded 0.6231 g in ground acceleration and 161.42 cm (63.55 in) per second in ground velocity; which corresponded to a Modified Mercalli intensity of X (Extreme). Subsequent analysis of a CCTV video which captured formation of surface rupture revealed that the western fault block experienced stronger shaking relative to the eastern block because the former experienced greater slip. Violent near-fault ground motion was observed with a peak ground acceleration of 1.41 g and acceleration of 3.8 m (12 ft) per second calculated from the video. The shaking in the video lasted several seconds with the largest ground motion pulse having a duration of only three seconds while the surface rupturing event lasted about two seconds.

The USGS' PAGER service estimated at least 415,000 people in areas of Mandalay, Bago, Naypyidaw and Sagaing were exposed to MMI X. Additionally, shaking corresponding to MMI IX (Violent) was exposed to an estimated 5.8 million people in the four regions. Another 3.6 million people were subjected to MMI VIII (Severe) shaking, the maximum intensity recorded in Magway Region, Shan and Kayin States. MMI VII (Very Strong) was also recorded in Kayah, Mon, Ayeyarwady, Yangon, and VI (Strong) in Rakhine, Chin, Kachins and Ruili in China. MMI V (Moderate) was recorded in Bangkok and Chiang Mai in Thailand, Dehong Dai and Jingpo Autonomous Prefecture in China, Imphal in India, and Yangon City. Overall, 38.92 million people, more than 70% of Myanmar's population, were estimated to have been exposed to shaking levels exceeding MMI VI in 14 of the 15 administrative divisions. (Note: Not counting the Wa Self-Administered Division or the five Self-Administered Zones of the country) In Thailand, shaking was felt in 63 of the country's 77 provinces.

The China Earthquake Administration estimated a maximum intensity of X on the China seismic intensity scale along the 400 km (250 mi) rupture, or an area of about 11,596 km^{2} (4,477 sq mi). Intensity IX surrounded the zone of maximum intensity, encompassing a 30,364 km^{2} (11,724 sq mi) area. This zone was surrounded by a 64,003 km^{2} (24,712 sq mi) area that experienced intensity VIII. Intensities VII and VI formed the inner and outer isoseismal bands according to the agency's assessment with areas of 16,254 km^{2} (6,276 sq mi) and 149,829 km^{2} (57,849 sq mi), respectively. In Nongdao, Yunnan, a seismic instrument recorded a maximum intensity of VIII, ground acceleration of 76.8 cm/s^{2} (2.52 ft/s^{2}) and velocity of 22.9 cm/s (9.0 in/s).

The earthquake was recorded by 27 accelerometers across northern and western Thailand including 5 in the Bangkok basin. It produced seismic waves that although weakened by the time it had travelled the distance between its source and Bangkok, was amplified in the basin by three to five times relative to nearby surrounding areas which were on bedrock. High-rise buildings swayed which was attributed to long-period ground motion generated by the earthquake propagating beneath Bangkok. In some buildings with 60 floors, the swaying was most extreme with movement as large as 1.6 m (5 ft 3 in) and the shaking lasting five minutes. This was due to the geology of Bangkok which is situated atop a basin with sediments as thick as 0.9 to 1 km (0.56 to 0.62 mi) with central Bangkok above the thickest part of the basin, which amplified ground motions as the seismic waves propagated through it, and allowed ground motions to persist for more than two minutes; much longer than outside the basin. Shaking was characterised as a long period in tall buildings as the ground exhibited velocities of up to 11 cm (4.3 in), 14 cm (5.5 in), and 4 cm (1.6 in) per second in the north-south, east-west, and up-down components, respectively. These motions were sufficient to cause tall buildings to sway and damage them. A peak ground acceleration of 0.02 g in Bangkok was recorded and is the strongest ever observed in the city. On the Modified Mercalli intensity and Japan Meteorological Agency long period ground motion scales, the ground motion in Bangkok was assigned V and Class-3, respectively.

== Impact ==
Casualties by country
Country	Deaths	Injuries	Missing
Myanmar	5,352	11,366	538
Thailand	103	36	0
China	0	2	0
Vietnam	1	0	0
Total	5,456	11,404	538

=== In Myanmar ===
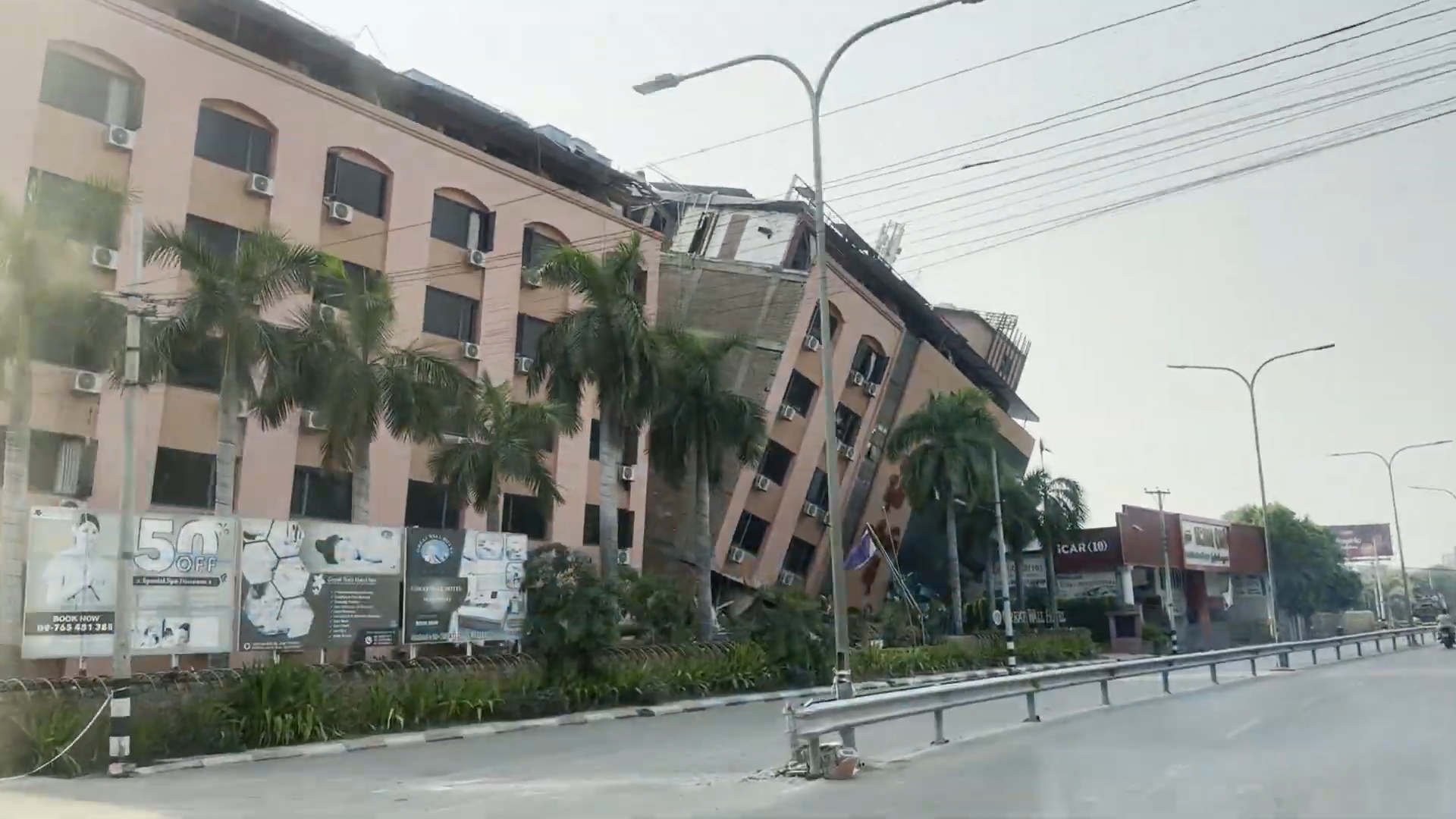
Damage to the Great Wall Hotel, Mandalay

The number of casualties in Myanmar varies across different sources. Mizzima News reported 5,352 fatalities, 7,108 injuries and 538 missing persons. According to data compiled by the Democratic Voice of Burma, 4,549 people died and 11,366 more were injured. The military-led State Administration Council (SAC) said 3,770 people died, 106 were missing and 5,106 others were injured. Due to the SAC only reporting casualties from government-controlled areas, censorship and the lack of transparency from many Burmese sources, it is believed that the true death toll is likely far higher. Deaths occurred in the administrative areas of Mandalay, Naypyidaw, Sagaing, Shan, Bago, Magway and Kayin. The United Nations High Commissioner for Refugees estimated that more than 17 million Burmese were affected across 57 of the 330 townships of Myanmar. By 10 April, rescuers said that thousands of unclaimed bodies were likely still trapped beneath collapsed structures, raising concerns of potential cholera and dengue outbreaks.

Phone and internet infrastructure was disrupted nationwide. Casualty estimates in rural areas remained scarce. More than 120,000 homes were damaged across the country, of which 48,834 collapsed, along with over 1,000 government buildings. The All Myanmar Islamic Religious Organization estimated at least 250 people died when over 50 mosques collapsed during Friday prayer time. The Spring Revolution Myanmar Muslim Network estimated that 700 Muslim worshippers were killed in Mandalay and Sagaing across at least 60 damaged mosques. The junta put the number of Muslims killed at 500, while the Democratic Voice of Burma estimated that thousands of Muslims may have died across the country, including 1,000 in Mandalay. The junta said that 65,096 houses and buildings, 2,514 schools, 4,317 Buddhist monasterial living quarters, 6,027 pagodas and temples, 350 hospitals and clinics, 170 bridges, 586 dams and 203 sections of the Yangon–Mandalay Expressway, the country's main highway, had been damaged or destroyed.

According to a May 2025 report from the World Bank, structural damage from the earthquake in Myanmar was estimated at US$11 billion, or 14% of Myanmar's GDP; losses were estimated at $5.47 billion in Mandalay, $2.26 billion in Sagaing, $1.27 billion in Bago, $1.04 billion in Naypyidaw, $401 million in Magway, $241 million in Shan, $121 million in Ayeyarwady, $86 million in Yangon, $30 million in Kayin, $25 million in Mon and $17 million in Kayah.

In Mandalay Region, 3,325 died and 2,642 were injured across Tada-U, Mattara, Meiktila, Pyawbwe, Yamethin, Thazi, Wundwin, Kyaukse, Singu and Sintgaing townships. A National Unity Government ministry estimated that 17,637 homes were damaged across the region. At least 1,870 people were killed in Mandalay District, where half of all buildings were thought to have been severely damaged or destroyed. At Mandalay International Airport, ceilings collapsed and some damage occurred in the basement. Buildings at the campus of Mandalay University collapsed or caught fire with many trapped inside. The Dokhtawaddy Bridge crossing the Myitnge River on the Yangon–Mandalay Expressway near Inwa also collapsed with supporting pylons falling down. Some vehicles were reportedly on the bridge at the time of the earthquake and fell into the river, though no casualties were confirmed. In Inwa itself, 75% of the historical structures in the former royal capital were damaged, including pagodas and temples. The earthquake also unearthed a water palace used for royal ceremonies. The Ministry of Religious Affairs and Culture plans to excavate and preserve the structure.

All 40 mosques in Mandalay were damaged, 10 of which collapsed, resulting in more than 400 deaths. Some mosques affected were over a century old and had not been allowed to be repaired since 1962. Several monks were killed and injured when a monastery collapsed in the city. Over 600 monks were trapped beneath the collapsed U Hla Thein Temple while they were taking examinations, 80 of whom died. Amarapura also recorded 250 deaths, including 150 from a collapsing mosque. The 12-storey Sky Villa condominium building in Aungmyethazan Township progressively collapsed, killing 207 people. Roads in Mandalay were left "in complete darkness" at night, with residents unable to access utilities such as power and running water. Some people reportedly found shelter from the almost 40 °C heat in the shade of trees in lieu of staying indoors for fear of aftershocks. At the collapsed Masoyein Monastery, at least 30 monks died and 50 were injured. At the Mandalay Central Prison, 12 civilians and military personnel were killed in building collapses.

In Maha Aungmye Township, a two-story tea shop collapsed, trapping around 70 people. Additionally, a three-story car accessories store also collapsed in Pyigyidagun Township, trapping more than 10 employees, and in the same township, a building under construction was razed, killing eight and trapping many others. A massive blaze in Sein Pan neighborhood of Maha Aungmye Township nearly reduced the entire place to the ground. Later assessments revealed more than 800 homes were burnt and 3,000 residents were affected. More than 400 people were killed and 1,000 more were injured in Pyawbwe Township, where most buildings were destroyed. In the township, a five-story Kanbawza Bank building collapsed, killing all 40 people inside. The Maha Aungmye Bonzan Monastery was also destroyed. Mandalay Palace and the Mahamuni Pagoda also suffered significant structural damage. A dam was also reported to have collapsed in Mandalay, causing flooding, while sections of the Mandalay-Yangon highway were damaged. In Yamethin, 216 deaths and many missing persons were reported. More than a dozen children were killed when a 100-year-old school collapsed in the township.

In Meiktila, houses and religious buildings suffered structural collapse. At least 44 deaths and 166 injuries were recorded in the city. Search and rescue teams reported 100 fatalities in the village of Bone Oe. In Wundwin Township, 65 deaths were reported and at least 30 died in Singu Township when a mine collapsed. Homes and pagodas were also razed in Madaya Township. At least 129 people died in Kyaukse Township, including 40 students and nine teachers who died in Kyaukse town after a school collapsed. At least 209 were also killed in Tada-U Township, while 50 deaths were recorded within three villages of Patheingyi Township.

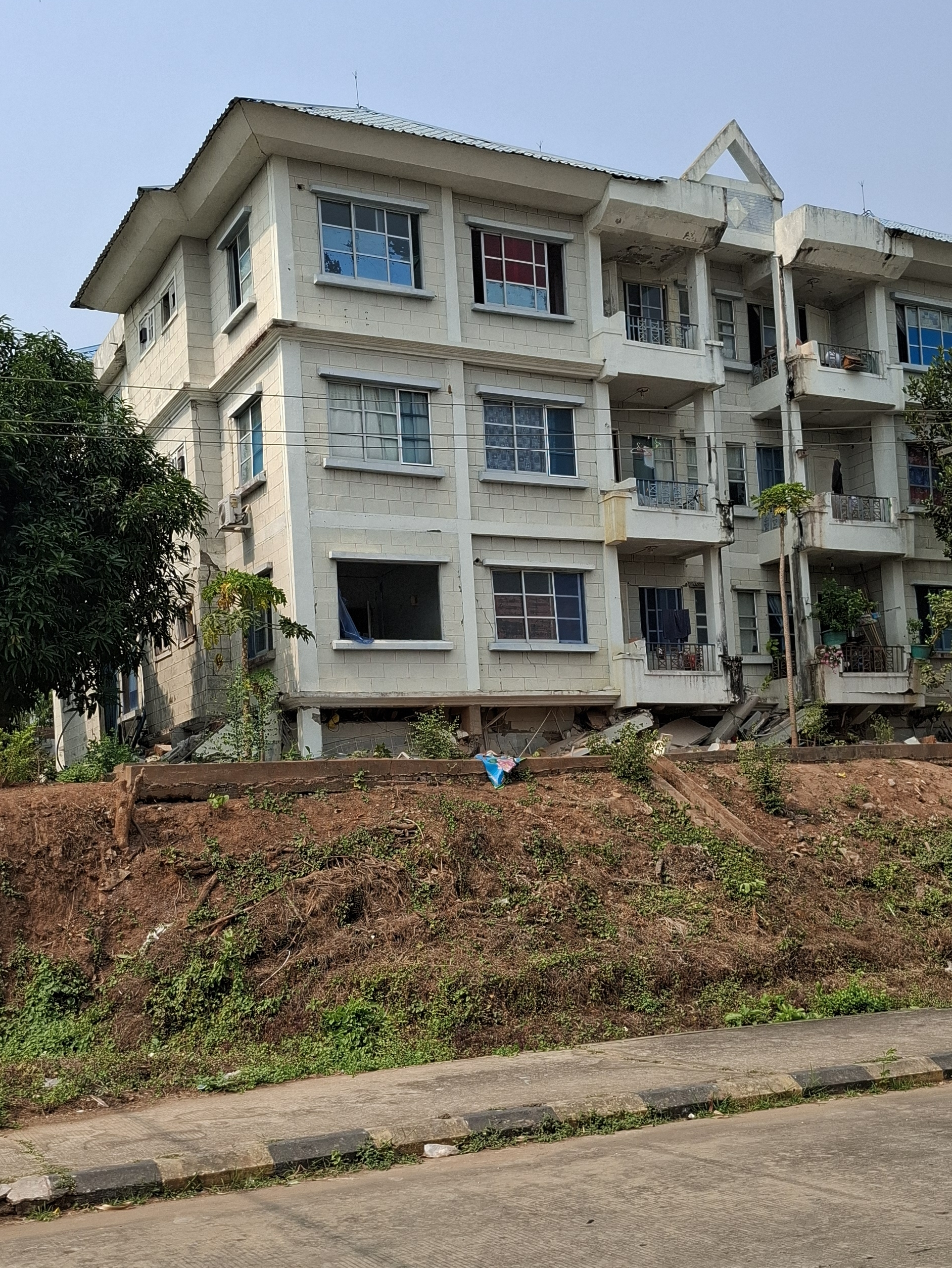
Partially-collapsed building in Naypyidaw

In Sagaing City, Sagaing Region, an estimated 1,000 fatalities were reported and 90% of structures were destroyed. An estimated 40 or 50 Muslim worshippers in the city died across three collapsed mosques. Much of the Ava Bridge and the city's fire station also collapsed, hampering relief efforts and trapping many. Out of the five mosques in Sagaing, four collapsed due to the earthquake. The Min Street Mosque is feared to have collapsed with over 100 people inside. Several monastic schools and a nunnery in the city were also damaged, likely killing people in the hundreds and trapping over 900 monks across four schools. Historic temples in resistance-held Chaung-U Township, southwest Sagaing Region were damaged by the earthquake. In Mingun, 20 people were killed by a collapsing military bunker and the nearby Hsinbyume Pagoda was also largely destroyed. Many deaths were also reported in Shwebo, Wetlet, Yinmabin, Kani and Pale townships; Shwebo recorded four fatalities.

Across the Naypyidaw Union Territory, 665 deaths were officially confirmed, although thousands more were believed dead. In Zabuthiri Township, 204 deaths were reported; a number of the people killed were civil servants who died when their apartments collapsed in several complexes. In many of these housing complexes, the ground floor collapsed, killing their inhabitants. Offices of the rescue, information, home affairs, labour, foreign affairs, defense, and agriculture and irrigation ministries were also severely damaged and 20 bodies were found among the ruins. Numerous military buildings collapsed, killing 100 soldiers. In Pyinmana, 245 deaths were reported across the town. Eighty-six bodies were discovered beneath the rubble of several collapsed buildings and monasteries. The air traffic control tower of Nay Pyi Taw International Airport collapsed, killing six people and reportedly leaving no survivors in the aftermath. Roads buckled while ceilings partially collapsed in the city. Several homes and religious shrines were also damaged. Officials at a 1,000-bed hospital said hundreds of injured people arrived, including 20 who died. The roof of that hospital's emergency room had collapsed. The military headquarters, parliament buildings and official housing buildings were heavily damaged; several government buildings collapsed and the permanent secretary of the labour ministry and several other senior foreign officials died. The Defence Services Museum and the National Museum in Naypyidaw also sustained damage.

At least 167 people were killed in Shan, including 135 in Nyaungshwe Township; many were reported in the 19 villages built on the shores of Inle Lake and 2,790 houses were damaged. In Kayla, a village with more than 1,000 households, at least 75% of it was destroyed and 42 residents died. The villages of Zayatgyi and Sheywagyi also reported major destruction. A local charity group said many people died from home collapses or electrocution. Fifty-one bodies were taken to a hospital but some could not be recovered as they were trapped underwater. In Aungban, 11 people were killed and 25 others were rescued after a six-storey hotel collapsed; six members of the same family were among the dead.

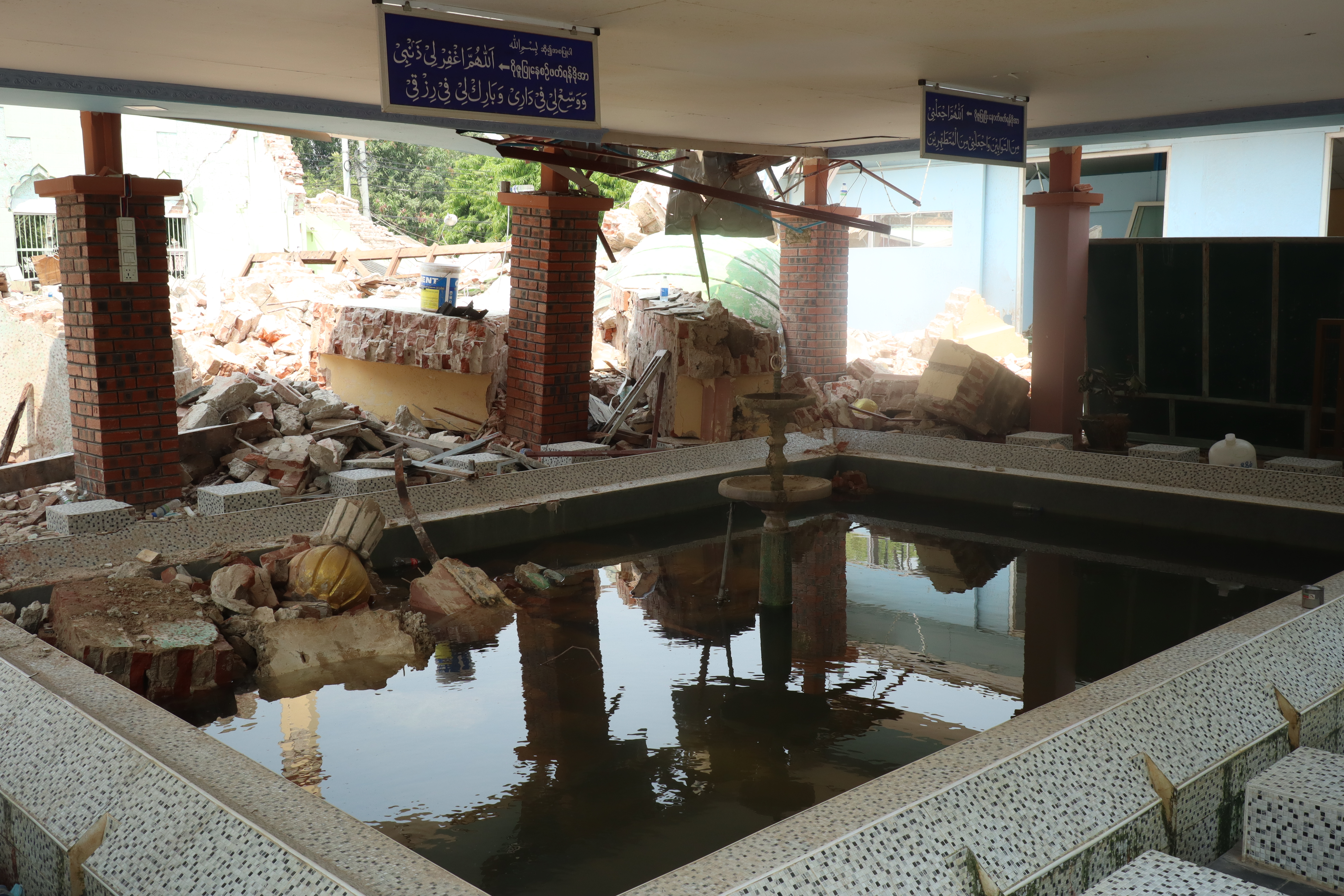
Ruins of a mosque in Sagaing

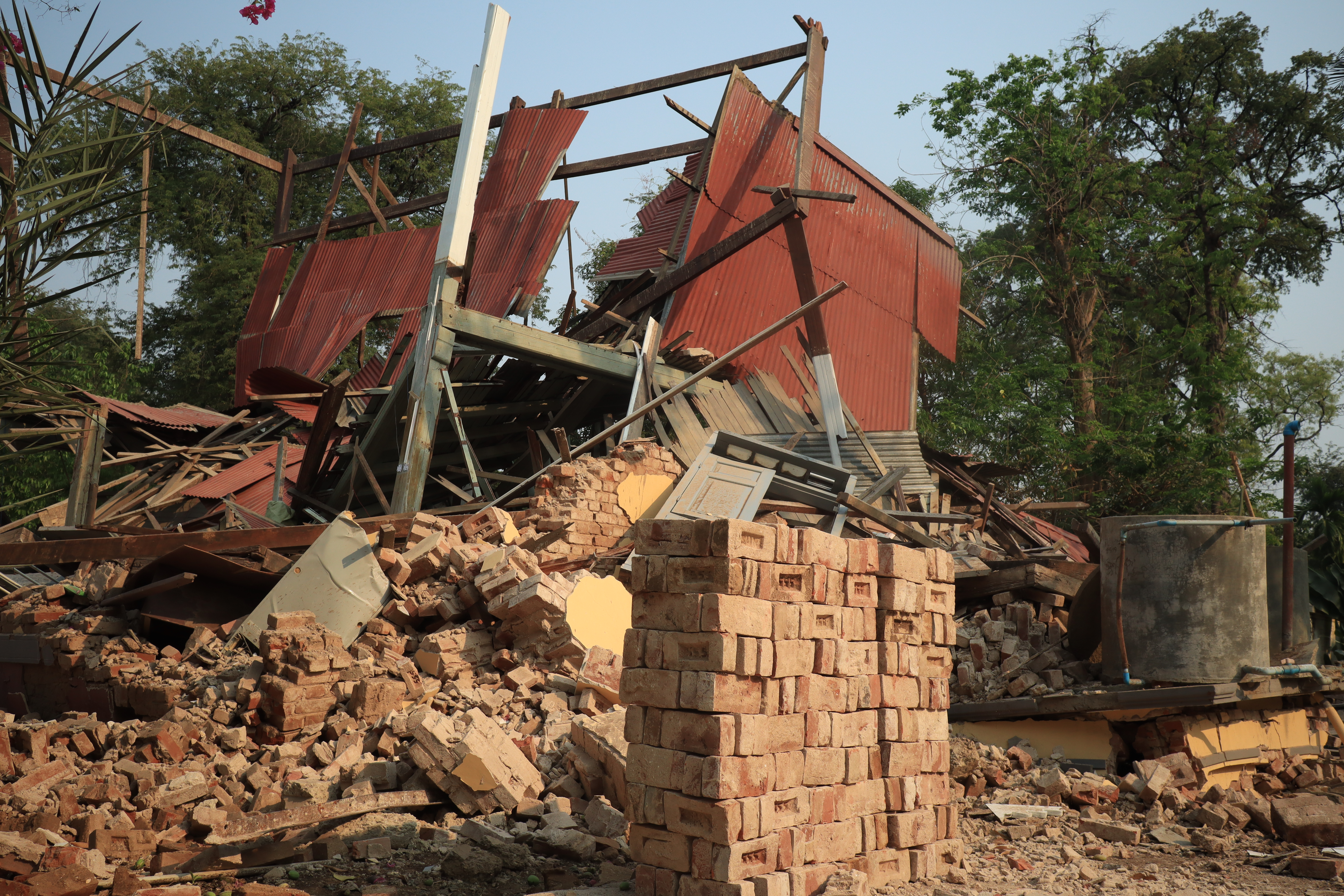
Debris of a religious building after the earthquake

In Bago, the death toll stood at 119 and 50 were injured in Taungoo, Pyu, Kyaukkyi, Kyauktaga, Oktwin, Yedashe and Htantabin townships. In Taungoo Township, 40 miners were killed by a collapsing mine. A school collapse in the township killed five children while 14 more were killed by a collapsing mosque. Another school serving as a shelter for displaced people collapsed, trapping more than 20 people. At least 161 people were killed in Pyay Township. In Pyu, 17 people died, including four members of a family when a wall of their home toppled. A local resident reported one death, 10 injuries and more than 50 damaged houses in the village of Ywa Ma Pai in Oktwin Township. One person was also killed in Pakokku, Magway.

Two deaths and building damage were reported in Karen National Union-controlled villages in Kyaukki and Shwegyin townships. In Yangon, minor damage occurred, some buildings were tilted and phone lines were downed. Damage in the city was estimated at US$86 million. Power outages occurred, with the electricity supply in Yangon being limited to four hours daily. Damage to cultural sites was also reported in Rakhine State.

Several foreign nationals were also killed, injured or reported missing following the earthquake in Myanmar. The Chinese embassy said at least six citizens were among the dead while 13 others were injured. A French couple travelling in Mandalay were also killed by falling debris. One Taiwanese national was among the victims, killed in the collapse of the Great Wall Hotel in Mandalay. South African officials also reported one of its citizens died. Two Filipino nationals also died, while two others went missing, all of whom were trapped in the Sky Villa condominium in Mandalay. A Japanese national died and two were injured in Mandalay.

=== In Thailand ===
All 102 fatalities in Thailand occurred in the Bangkok area. Most of the dead were reported in Chatuchak district while seven deaths occurred in other parts of the city. The earthquake was felt in 63 of Thailand's 77 provinces and damage was reported in 18 provinces, mostly in the north and around Bangkok.

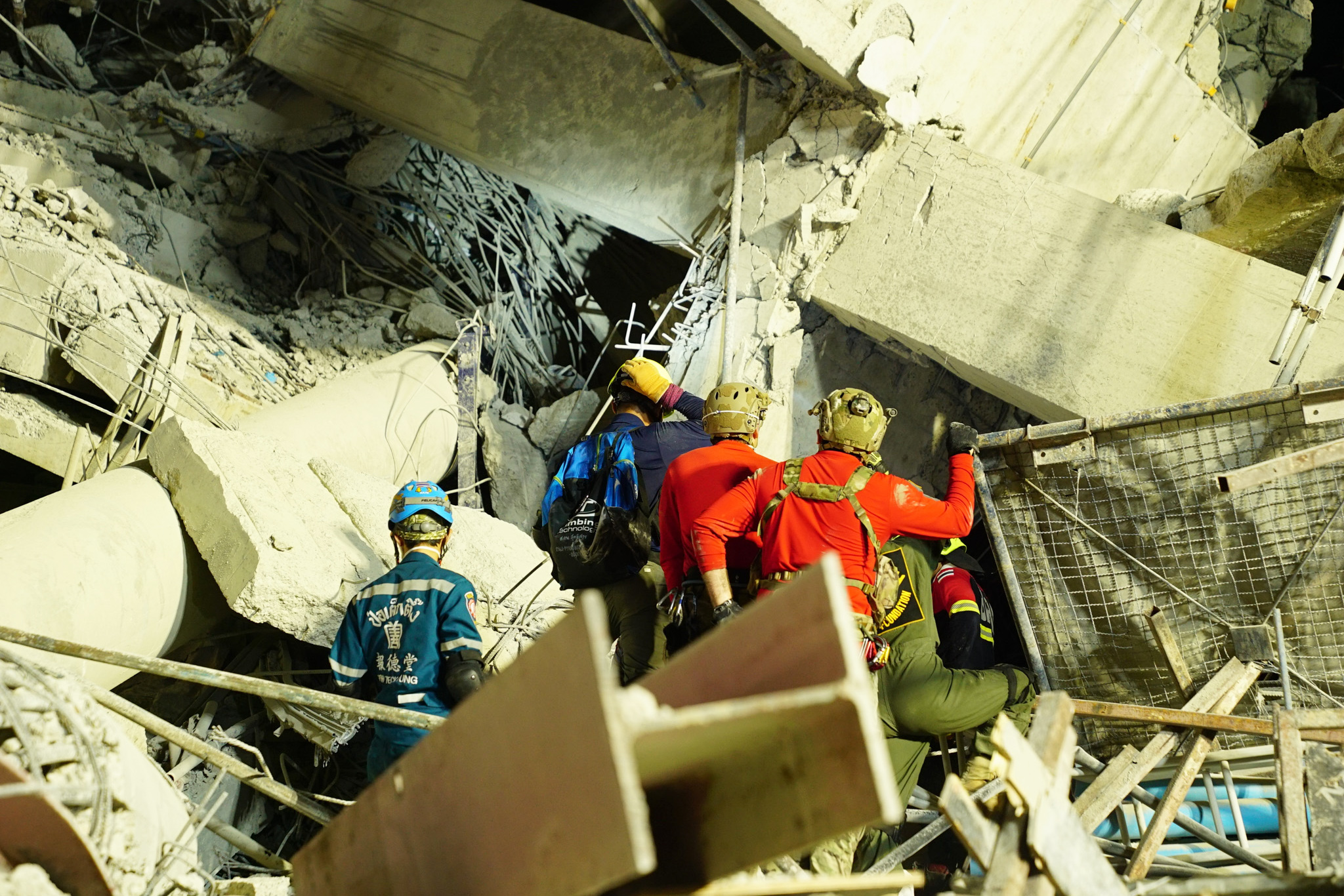
Rescue efforts at the collapsed State Audit Office building

At least 95 people died when an under-construction skyscraper collapsed. The collapsed building was a 33-story office tower being built for the State Audit Office in Chatuchak district. Early reports noted 68 who received medical attention. Among the dead were 10 migrant workers from Myanmar and one Cambodian national.

A crane operator died and four people were injured when a crane collapsed at a construction site in the Bang Pho area, one construction worker was crushed by a falling concrete slab in Khan Na Yao District, and five people died trying to evacuate from tall buildings, including two later in hospital. Three people were injured when an elevator failed, and another crane collapse in Din Daeng injured four and damaged the Chaloem Maha Nakhon Expressway's Din Daeng toll plaza, forcing its closure. At least 35 were injured around Bangkok and one person was injured in Nonthaburi province. Two sudden deaths, possibly from heart attacks, were also reported, in Nonthaburi and Samut Prakan provinces, though these have not been officially confirmed to be related to the earthquake.

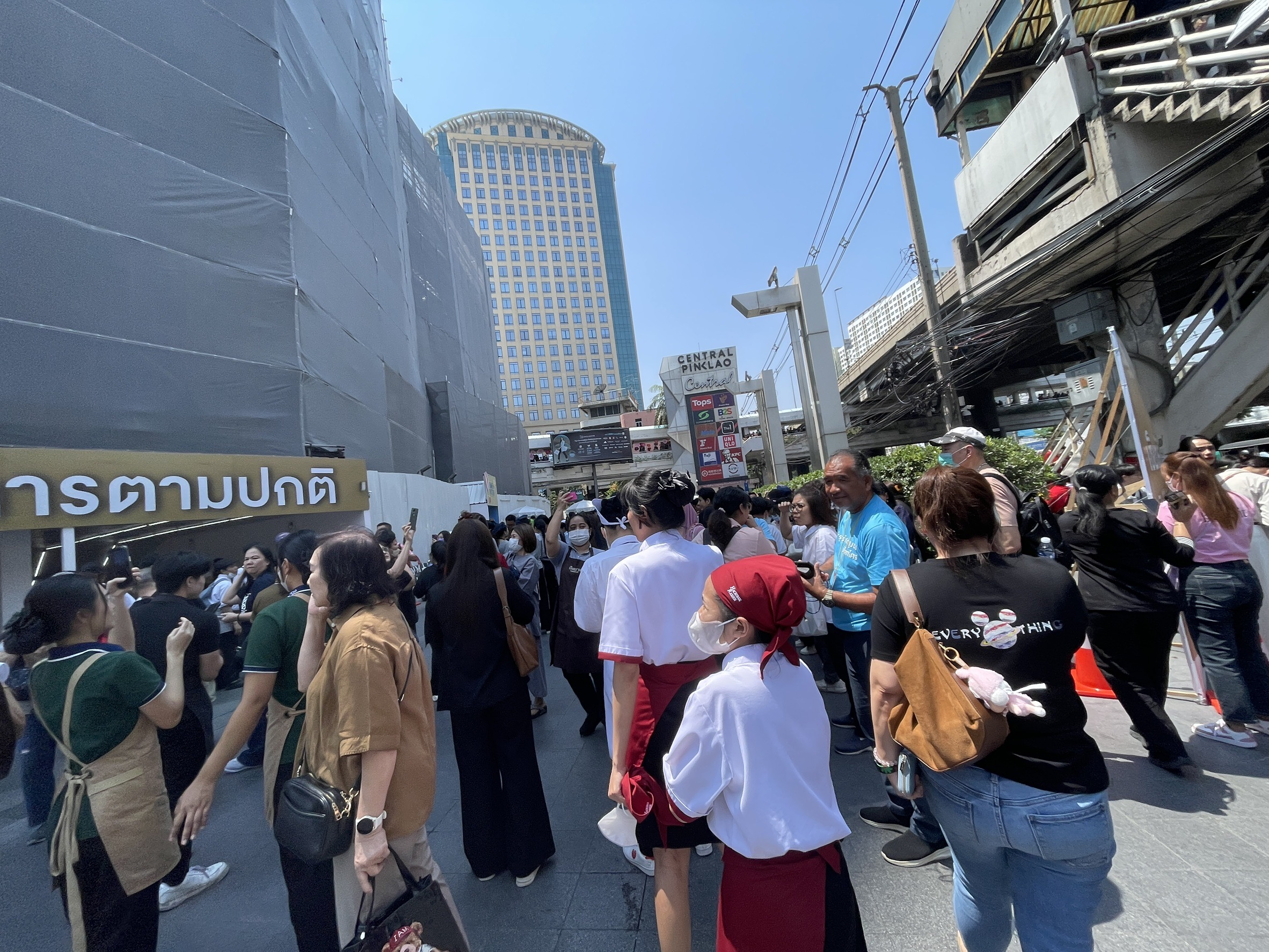
Evacuation in Khet Bangkok Noi, Bangkok

Deputy Prime Minister Phumtham Wechayachai described the shaking as unprecedented in Bangkok in the past 100 years. It caused marked swaying in high-rise buildings, triggering widespread panic among occupants, many of whom rushed to exit into the streets. Most buildings were evacuated, and public venues were closed down. All rapid transit lines were suspended, and some roads were closed. Road traffic came to a standstill, and remained severely congested into the night. After all other rapid transit lines reopened, the MRT Pink Line remained suspended as its power rail was dislocated in Min Buri district, Bangkok.

A skyscraper sways during the earthquake

Many high-rise buildings developed visible damage as a result of the earthquake both inside and outside. Sky bridges connecting three luxury high-rise apartment towers were severed by the tremor, causing debris to fall off while water spilled from the rooftop pools of the buildings, as well as many others. One fire incident was also reported, which was caused by a stove left unattended by fleeing residents. Bangkok governor Chadchart Sittipunt stated that the Bangkok Metropolitan Administration's reporting platform received over 14,430 reports of building damage, while it planned to inspect 700 structures across the city. He later urged the owners of 11,000 buildings across the capital to assess their property's safety. The interior ministry said that 3,375 government buildings had been affected by the earthquake nationwide, with 221 of them in sustaining moderate damage and 34 others in severe condition. The Bangkok Metropolitan Administration also said 70 schools in the capital sustained slight damage.

Throughout the country, the Ministry of Public Health reported that 63 of its hospitals in 17 provinces were affected by the earthquake, with many temporarily evacuating patients. Several sustained damage, mostly in the form of wall cracks. Rajavithi Hospital in Bangkok moved patients out of its 25-storey building, housing them in a sports hall while the main building, which exhibited multiple cracks, awaited inspection. It later transferred 162 patients to other hospitals.

In Chiang Mai, cracks appeared in several condominium buildings. Across the country, damage was reported from 591 houses, 55 temples, 86 hospitals, nine buildings, 52 schools and 25 government buildings in Chiang Mai, Chiang Rai, Phayao, Lamphun, Lampang, Mae Hong Son, Phrae, Nan, Phetchabun, Phitsanulok, Sukhothai, Ang Thong, Phra Nakhon Si Ayutthaya, Pathum Thani, Nonthaburi, Samut Prakan, Samut Sakhon and Chai Nat provinces. Damage to religious and cultural sites was recorded in Lampang, Nan, and Chiang Mai provinces. Twenty 10-tonne (11-ton) concrete beams being installed for an elevated section of the new Den Chai–Chiang Rai–Chiang Khong railway also collapsed and crushed six vehicles in Chiang Rai province, without causing injuries. Six sinkholes were reported in Ban Mae Surin, a village in the Khun Yuam district of Mae Hong Son.

=== Elsewhere ===
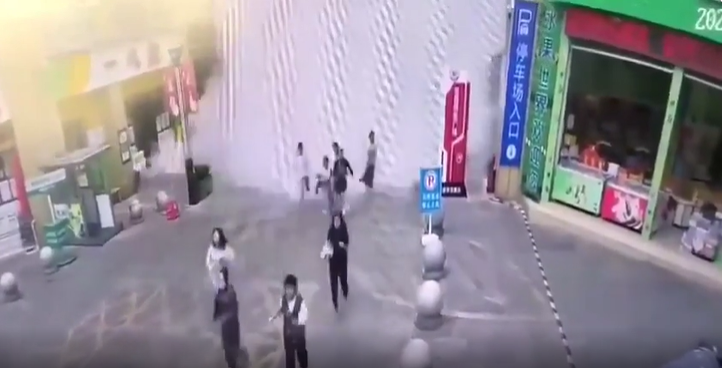
A CCTV still of a rooftop infinity pool collapse sweeping away a crowd of people in Yunnan Province, China

In Yunnan, China, the earthquake was strongly felt across the province. Two people were injured in the border city of Ruili, while nine others were rescued after being trapped in an elevator. In Ruili, sections of brick and walls on a high rise building collapsed. At least 847 homes were damaged in the city, affecting 2,840 people. In Longchuan and Lianghe counties, two walls and an abandoned house collapsed and several schools and three homes were damaged. Other provinces including Guizhou, Guangxi and Sichuan also felt the tremors.

Tremors were felt in Hanoi and Ho Chi Minh City, Vietnam, and in Vientiane, Laos, causing people to evacuate buildings. In Ho Chi Minh City, 400 apartments were damaged, and in District 8, one person died from shock during evacuation.

In India, shaking was experienced in the Delhi-National Capital Region. Tremors were also felt in Kolkata and Imphal, and in the states of Tripura, Mizoram and Meghalya. In Basirhat, residents reported the shaking of natural water bodies. The Bengali newspaper agency Aajkaal reported that residents of Basirhat felt the earthquake for as long as 30 minutes, as water bodies shook for a similar duration. Tremors were also felt in parts of Assam including Guwahati.

In Bangladesh, the shaking was widely felt including reports from Dhaka, Sylhet, Rajshahi and Chittagong. The earthquake was also felt in Cambodia and the northern Malaysian states of Penang, Kedah and Kelantan.

=== Estimations of losses ===
The USGS Prompt Assessment of Global Earthquakes for Response (PAGER) service estimated a 40% probability of economic losses exceeding US$100 billion and a 35% probability of economic losses between US$10 billion and US$100 billion; upper estimates of economic losses exceed Myanmar's GDP of $64.2 billion. The service also estimated a 44% probability of deaths exceeding 100,000 and a 34% probability of deaths between 10,000 and 100,000. The Thai Hotels Association said that it expected international tourist arrivals to decrease by at least 10–15% in the two weeks following the earthquake, adding that 10% of foreign tourists had checked out following the earthquake. Tourism minister Sorawong Thienthong noted that there had been over 1,000 hotel room bookings in the two days following the earthquake, while there was a shift in destination preferences from Bangkok to other places such as Pattaya.

== Myanmar civil war impact ==
Jet fighters en route for an aerial bombing campaign against Danu People's Liberation Army positions during the earthquake dropped bombs at 12:55 MMT in Nawnghkio Township causing further damage to affected villages and killing seven fighters. From 28 March to 5 April, military airstrikes killed at least 68 civilians and members of rebel forces. The airbase in Monywa continued operations against resistance-held Chaung-U Township, deploying a paradrop attack at 19:00 MMT on the day of the earthquake. The following day, the junta resumed aerial bombardment on territories held by resistance forces in Karen, northern Shan, Bago and Sagaing regions. The People's Defence Force, a rebel force, said they would observe a partial ceasefire for two weeks beginning on 30 March. Despite this, the junta conducted a bombing campaign in Pauk Township, Sagaing Region. An airstrike in Singu Township, Mandalay, on 31 March injured several residents and burnt down their homes. The junta also continued bombing campaigns in Rakhine State, destroying parts of the hospital in Arakan Army-controlled Ponnagyun on 28 March with Arakan Army continuing offensive operations in Kyaukphyu Township.

The Three Brotherhood Alliance similarly announced a partial ceasefire on 1 April. Junta leader Min Aung Hlaing announced that evening on Myawaddy TV that he would continue military operations against the PDF and anti-junta EAOs; he claimed that they were preparing for future attacks.

On 2 April, troops from the regime fired warning shots at nine trucks carrying Chinese relief items in Nawnghkio Township, Shan. That same day, the regime announced a 20-day ceasefire, but dozens of attacks were reported since then. Since 13 April, the regime has conducted at least 72 airstrikes and killed more than 100 across Sagaing, Magway, Bago, Mandalay, Karenni, Shan, Chin, Ayeyarwady, Kachin, Karen, Mon, and Rakhine. The ceasefire breach was condemned by the United Nations, which also demanded for the release of Aung San Suu Kyi who was detained by the regime.

== Aftermath ==
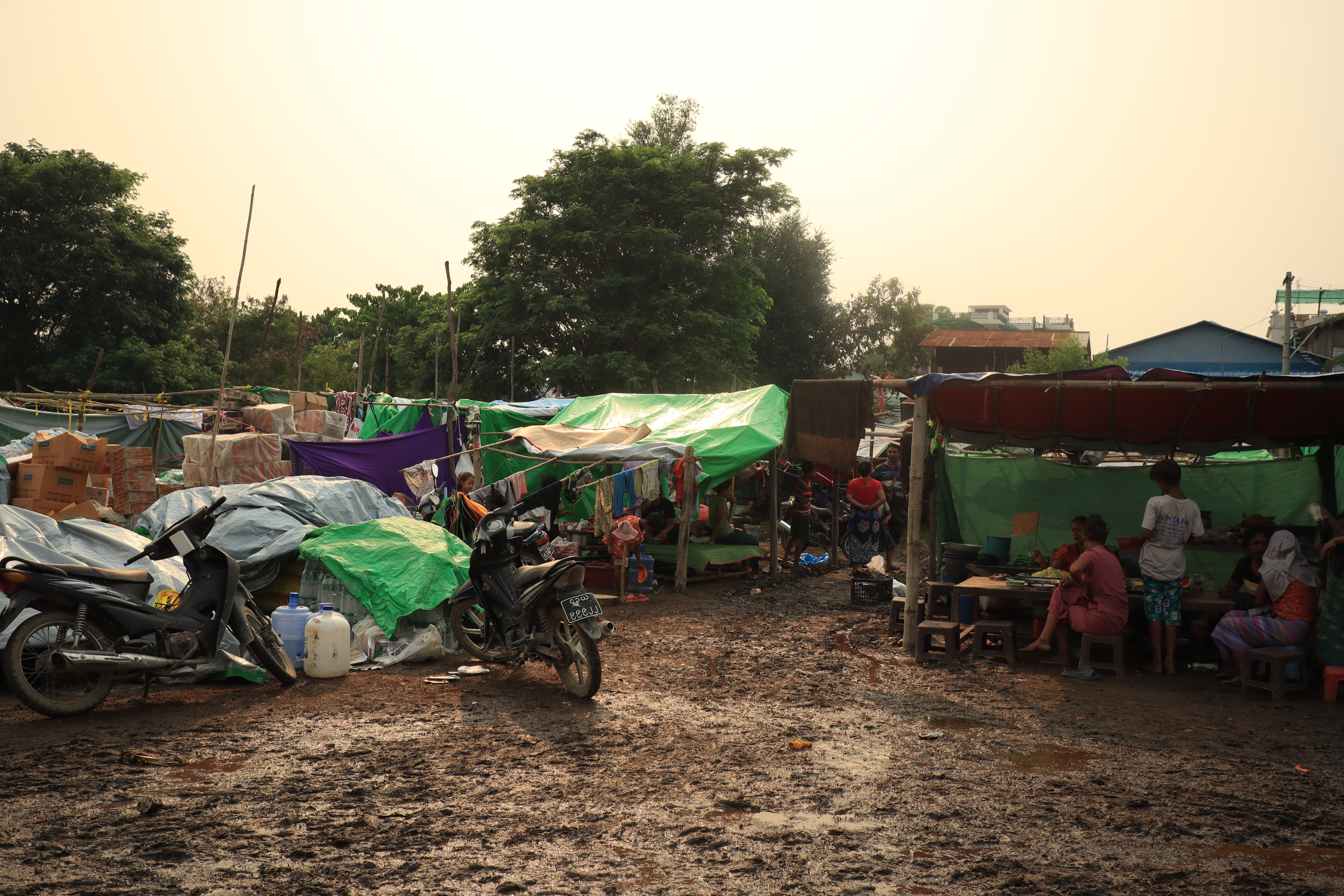
People in earthquake shelters

In a statement by the United Nations Office for the Coordination of Humanitarian Affairs (OCHA) on 1 April, shelter, clean water and medicine were running low in Myanmar. Additionally, due to the lack of clean water, the United Nations warned about the possibility of a cholera outbreak. The World Health Organization said that many hospitals in the region were also running beyond their intended capacity. Damaged roads and bridges also hampered rescue missions. OCHA added that it took their team 13 hours to reach Mandalay from Yangon instead of the typical eight-hour travel time. In many parts of Myanmar, the first responders were volunteer groups who, without special equipment, tried to pull survivors from the rubble.

Although the military regime appealed for international aid, several human rights organisations said there is a selective allocation of assistance. Some affected regions such as Sagaing and Shan were receiving less aid whereas most resources were directed at Mandalay and Naypyidaw. Some groups said the regime may be falsely claiming logistical challenges to rationalise restricting aid in resistance-controlled areas. Amnesty International also shared a similar statement. United Nations rapporter Tom Andrews said there were many reports of the military preventing aid and workers from accessing some areas.

Many residents in Mandalay slept in the streets during the first night after the earthquake due to persistent aftershocks. Due to limited equipment and emergency specialists, the city's residents conducted their own rescue activities. On 29 March, rescuers were still working to retrieve at least 90 people trapped in one of the condominiums that collapsed. According to a Red Cross member, nine bodies and 44 survivors were pulled from the wreckage. The Mandalay General Hospital reached its capacity and dozens of injured patients received treatment outside the building. Fires also spread through Thannauk, Sein Pan and Maha Aungthan West wards with the latter being entirely reduced to ashes, according to Mandalay residents. Road closures and fuel shortages in Mandalay continued to hinder rescue efforts. By 31 March, the Myanmar Fire Services Department said it rescued 403 people and recovered 259 bodies in the city. While most residents left their apartments, reports emerged of lootings at night in some parts of the city. More than 40 injured inmates at the Mandalay Central Prison were denied treatment at main hospitals despite their pleas.

In Sagaing, a resident said many bodies were buried in mass graves, but due to the lack of space, others were sent to nearby Mandalay for cremation. Even so, there was a lack of cremators to accommodate the overwhelming number of dead which began to decompose in the days after the earthquake. Officials were short on body bags, food and dress. Rescue efforts in the city were minimal, in part due to a collapsed fire station trapping emergency personnel and lack of safe bridge access from Mandalay. Many bodies remained buried beneath the rubble while much of the city was abandoned. Residents also reported a strong stench emanating from residential areas due to unrecovered bodies. As the Muslim cemetery in Sagaing had been closed due to fighting between the military and rebels, the remains of Muslim fatalities were transported to Mandalay for burial.

In Naypyidaw, many people were buried beneath collapsed structures. The junta leader initially did not disclose the extent of damage in the capital but later said the scale was "massive". The city morgue was overwhelmed by the number of bodies and the lack of power meant they were rotting. Decomposing bodies were also found along the road outside the facility. Workers of the junta regime continued to work in the open lawn beside the ruins of their ministry buildings. The National Disaster Management Committee office was severely damaged thus workers held meetings at the Ministry of Social Welfare, Relief, and Resettlement. Although the regime sent teams to the collapsed housing complex areas, they did not assist in the rescue. The regime announced in April that they would revise the city's urban planning and new office buildings would be earthquake-resistant.

Nearly a week after the earthquake, rescue efforts were still ongoing in Taungoo, Bago. A resident said there was no international assistance, so residents carried out rescue efforts themselves while a social worker said their equipment was inadequate. Telecommunication services in Yangon were disabled from the time of the earthquake until past 22:00 MMT. Electricity was only available intermittently, and in townships further afield not available at all. In Pathein, Ayeyarwady Region, the earthquake knocked out electrical services and disabled the generators used for water pumping for several days. By 7 April, the rescue teams from several countries left Myanmar after completing rescue efforts and few teams remained in Naypyidaw. In Sagaing city, rescue works ended on 6 April as clean-up and restoration was underway.

In Bangkok, trading on the Stock Exchange of Thailand was suspended. The finance ministry did not report any major losses on the economy, fiscal infrastructure or financial system.

Thai Air Traffic Control issued a nationwide no-fly order for all airports, while train services between Bangkok and north and northeastern Thailand were also suspended. Services on the BTS Skytrain and "long-distance" routes were resumed by the evening of 28 March. The MRT Blue Line and Purple Line resumed operations on the morning of 29 March, followed by the Yellow Line on 30 March. The Pink Line partially reopened on 31 March; Min Buri station remained closed until 16 April due to a dislocated power rail. Inspectors were deployed across Bangkok to check the safety of buildings.

On 29 March, rescuers said at least 15 people were found alive but trapped within the rubble of the State Audit Office building site in Chatuchak district. Many of the workers trapped were believed to be migrants from Myanmar. Rescuers used drones, sniffer dogs and cranes to carry out their operations. The family members of those trapped also visited the site of the collapse.

On 31 March, a mb 4.2 aftershock caused additional buildings to collapse in Mandalay. By 5 April, power outages continued to affect the vast majority of residents in Yangon, Mandalay and Naypyidaw. On 13 April, a M_{w} 5.3 aftershock collapsed a dam in Tatkon Township, and an apartment building in Mandalay. More buildings collapsed in Mandalay due to heavy rains on 10 May. On 17 May, a M_{w} 5.2 aftershock near Myittha caused a tree to fall onto a temporary tent in Maha Aungmye Township, killing a father and his son.

== Domestic responses ==
=== Myanmar ===
The State Administration Council junta (SAC) declared a state of emergency in six regions, including Sagaing, Mandalay, Bago, Magway, Shan State, and Naypyidaw, following the earthquake. SAC Chairman Min Aung Hlaing visited a hospital in Naypyidaw to assess the treatment of the injured. The junta also requested international humanitarian aid to assist with the aftermath of the disaster. General Zaw Min Tun said many hospitals in Mandalay, Naypyidaw, and Sagaing received a large number of injured patients and needed blood donors. In Sagaing city, junta soldiers conducted security checks and prevented unpermitted rescue operations from being carried out. Military checkpoints also hampered efforts to bury bodies as they blocked off the Islamic cemetery in the city. Emergency response teams from Ayeyarwady Region and Yangon were dispatched to Naypyidaw to help with search and rescue efforts. Reporters in Mandalay described rescue operations as slow with a shortage of personnel. Many collapsed buildings remain unsearched and few survivors have been found in searched buildings.

The National Unity Government of Myanmar (NUG) met to coordinate emergency relief efforts and called for international aid. US$1 million was allocated for emergency rescue with PDF forces deployed to aid affected resistance-controlled regions in Sagaing, Mandalay and Magway Regions. The government offered assistance in bringing aid into their territories if the junta would guarantee the safety of medical personnel. The day after the earthquake, the NUG announced a two-week pause on offensives to coordinate humanitarian efforts with the UN and non-governmental groups. Despite this, the military continued airstrikes against rebel-held villages, prompting condemnation from United Nations Special Rapporteur on Human Rights in Myanmar Tom Andrews. Min Aung Hlaing announced on 1 April that he would continue military operations against rebels. That same day, the Three Brotherhood Alliance announced a month-long ceasefire to facilitate relief efforts, followed on 2 April by the junta, which said it would observe a ceasefire until 22 April. However, the following day, the junta conducted an aerial bombing campaign in Indaw, Sagaing Region and continued shelling in Bhamo, Kachin State, which occurred despite a ceasefire declared on 2 April by the Kachin Independence Army.

On 31 March 2025, the junta declared a period of national mourning that would last until 6 April 2025. A minute of silence was held at 12:51:02 MMT, the exact time the earthquake occurred, on 1 April. The junta also said that Thingyan celebrations scheduled in April were to be observed without singing, dancing, or festive entertainment. On 5 April, Min Aung Hlaing announced that 10 million kyats would be given for every person killed in the earthquake.

On 19 April 2025, Min Aung Hlaing announced a redrawing of Naypyidaw's layout due to damage caused by the earthquake, while the offices of the foreign and labour ministries were transferred to the previous capital, Yangon.

Some local aid groups were involved in distributing living tents among survivors. The junta was also accused of stockpiling aid meant for immediate distribution. ABC News said they received photos of relief supplies with the ASEAN logo at a warehouse in Naypyidaw and an anonymous claim that there were still unused nearly a month after the earthquake. A National Unity Government representative suspected that many aid from ASEAN did not reach the worse-affected areas which were controlled by the junta, and urged ASEAN to investigate the matter.

=== Thailand ===
Prime Minister Paetongtarn Shinawatra cut short her attendance at a tourism conference in Phuket to return to Bangkok and held an emergency meeting on the disaster. She later visited the collapsed State Audit Office building site in Chatuchak and ordered the formation of a committee of experts to investigate the collapse within a week. She also announced that the royal family would place those injured by the earthquake under its patronage. The Ministry of Labour announced that it would provide up to two million baht in compensation for relatives of those who died in the State Audit Office building collapse and cover the treatment of those injured. At a meeting with Min Aung Hlaing on the sidelines of the Sixth BIMSTEC Summit in Bangkok on 4 April, Paetongtarn offered the use of Don Mueang Airport to transport international aid heading for Myanmar.

Governor of Bangkok Chadchart Sittipunt declared a level 2 disaster area for the city, which was lifted on 31 March. He also ordered Lumphini, Benchasiri, Benjakitti and Chatuchak Parks to remain open overnight on 28 March to accommodate stranded and displaced people. Around 400 people took shelter in city parks overnight. The Ministry of Transport deployed additional public buses, while the management of Suvarnabhumi Airport implemented a temporary shuttle bus service to mitigate a shortage of taxis traveling to and from the airport. The Ministry of Education ordered a nationwide closure of schools. Mental health hotlines maintained by the Ministry of Health expanded its hotline services and received at least 1,598 following the earthquake. Pathum Thani and Phrae provinces were also declared as emergency disaster assistance zones. Criticism arose in Thailand over a delay in the dissemination of SMS warnings regarding the earthquake.

On 30 March, Interior Minister Anutin Charnvirakul said an investigation into the audit office building collapse was to be completed within a week. Anutin also added that Chinese disaster specialists would assist in the enquiry. The Anti-Corruption Organisation of Thailand, a government watchdog, found substandard steel rebars after gathering debris samples and performing an initial test. On 31 March 2025, reports of cracks and tremors prompted the evacuation of multiple buildings across Bangkok. While initially reported by some outlets as being due to aftershocks, the Department of Disaster Prevention and Mitigation confirmed that the aftershocks on 31 March were too weak to affect Thailand. Authorities later dismissed the scare as a false alarm, with city engineers stating that the reported cracks were not new and had appeared since 28 March. The Ministry of Health also warned against what it called "earthquake drunk" syndrome, a condition attributed to disruptions to balance that resulted in people having swaying or moving feelings following an earthquake.

On 31 March, a minute of silence was held in the Senate of Thailand for the victims of the earthquake.

=== China ===
Authorities in Yunnan deployed 646 rescuers and 14 search dogs for rescue operations in the province.

== International humanitarian efforts ==
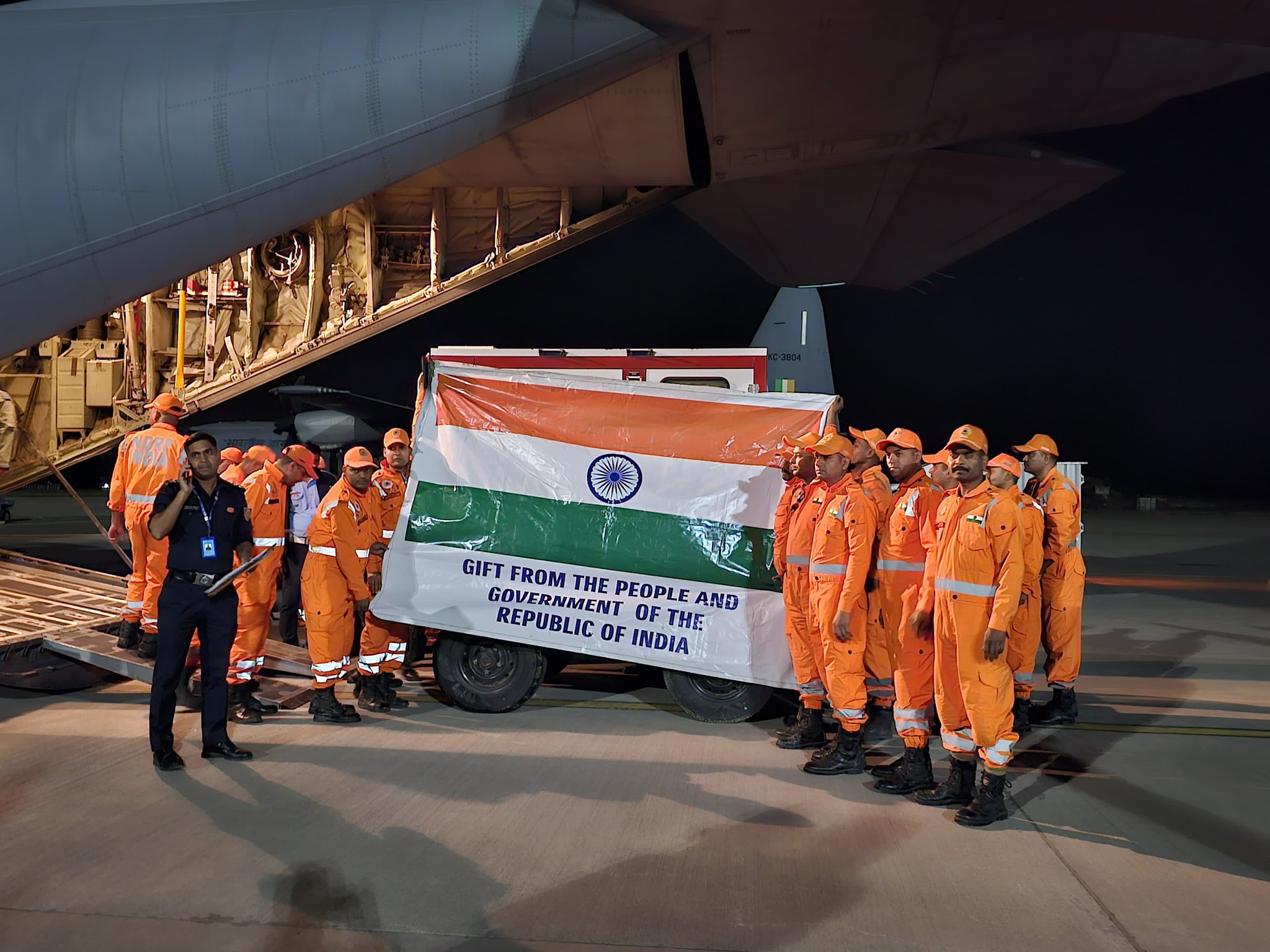
Airlift by IAF consisting of NDRF volunteers and equipment for rescue operations

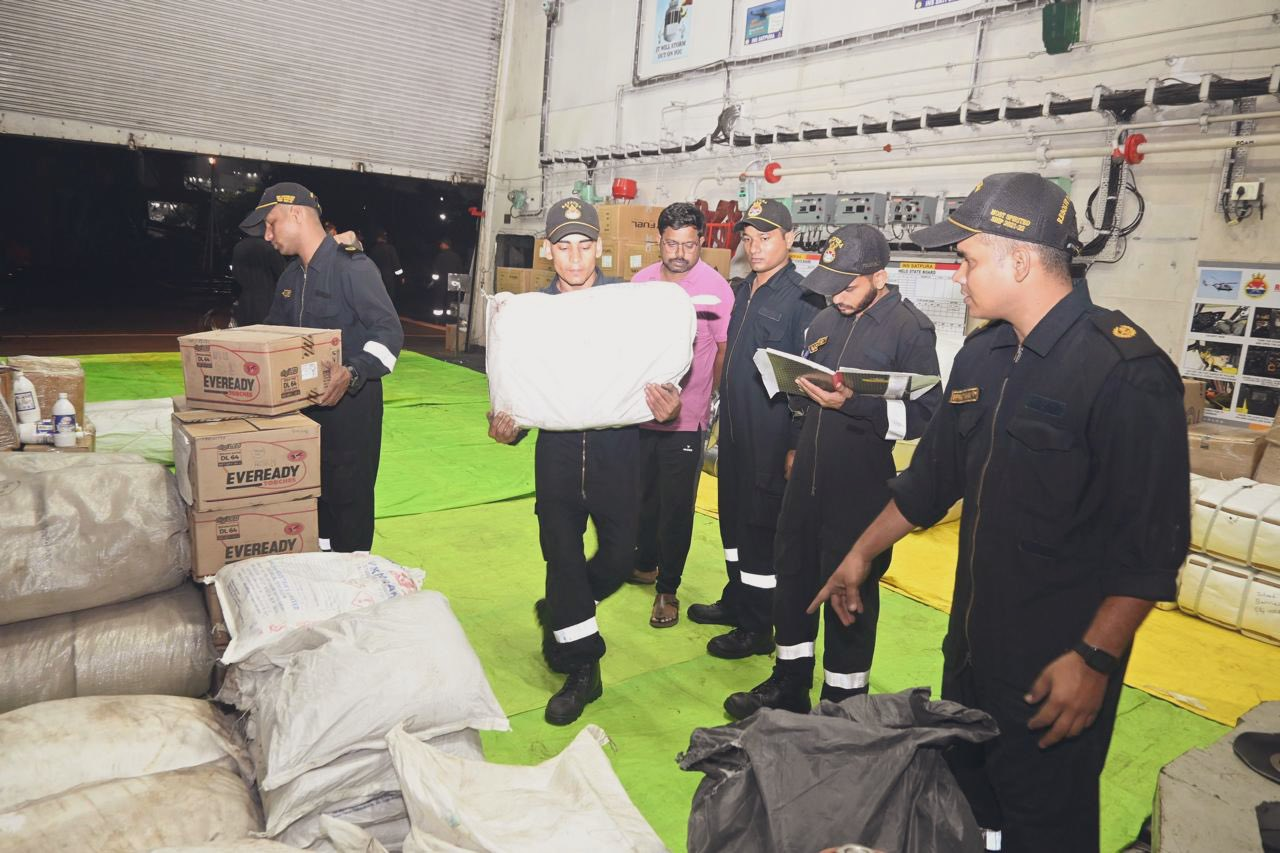
Indian Navy officials loading INS Satpura and INS Savitri with 40 tonnes of humanitarian aid under Operation Brahma, heading for the Port of Yangon

=== International organisations ===
Various countries pledged support in the form of humanitarian aid. Myanmar accepted aid from India and the AHA Centre while the United Nations and its Central Emergency Response Fund provided US$93 and US$5 million, respectively. The International Charter Space and Major Disasters was activated by the United Nations Satellite Centre (UNOSAT) on behalf of the United Nations Office for the Coordination of Humanitarian Affairs (OCHA) at 10:21 UTC on 28 March, thus providing for widespread humanitarian satellite coverage. The International Federation of Red Cross and Red Crescent Societies launched an emergency appeal on 30 March for more than US$100 million to help earthquake victims. The World Health Organization announced a dispatch of 60 tonnes of critical medical supplies, including mobile medical tents, surgical kits and medicines.

The European Union (EU) provided a total of €2.5 million in initial emergency assistance to Myanmar, along with a humanitarian airlift operation to convey 80 tons of emergency supplies to Mandalay, with a first flight from Copenhagen, Denmark bringing tents, health, water, child protection kits and sanitation kits to the United Nations Children's Fund (UNICEF) and distributed by EU partners. The Association of Southeast Asian Nations (ASEAN) Coordinating Centre for Humanitarian Assistance on Disaster Management (AHA Centre) deployed the ASEAN Emergency Response and Assessment Team (ASEAN-ERAT) to conduct rapid needs assessment in affected areas with the association member states responding individually with search and rescue operations, the deployment of relief teams with assessment experts, humanitarian assistance support such as food and medical supplies, financial aid, logistics, and equipment.

=== State actors ===
Summary of international aid
Country/Region	Cash value	Humanitarian aid and supplies
Australia	A$7 million	Monetary donation through the International Committee of the Red Cross (ICRC). Australia Assists activated a rapid response team and another A$3.5 million allocated to NGOs and their local partners for food, water, sanitation, emergency health and education. Another A$500 thousand for the Emergency Action Alliance, and another A$3 million for emergency relief supplies for the ASEAN Coordinating Centre for Humanitarian Assistance on Disaster Management.
Bangladesh		Chief Adviser Muhammad Yunus ordered the Bangladesh Armed Forces to deploy rescue and medical teams to Myanmar with relief supplies, including medicine, tents, dry food, and medical services. These supplies and medicines were delivered in two phases using three planes from the Bangladesh Army and Bangladesh Air Force.
Belarus		Twenty tonnes of items, including tents, blankets and food.
Belgium	€100,000	
Brunei		Sent three members of the ASEAN-ERAT team to Myanmar on 31 March.
Cambodia	US$100,000	
Canada	CA$9.75 million	Funds for emergency medical services and the supply of shelter, food and other essential items. Allocated to multiple organisations; CA$4 million to the Canadian Red Cross to support the International Federation of Red Cross and Red Crescent Societies (IFRC) Societies, CA$2 million to the World Food Programme, CA$2 million million to OCHA to support the Myanmar Humanitarian Fund and up to CA$1.75 million to the Humanitarian Coalition and its members through the Canadian Humanitarian Assistance Fund.
China	US$150.77 million	Initial US$13.77 million for supplies including tents, blankets, medical kits, sustenance and other items. Thirty-seven members of a search and rescue team from Yunnan, China, arrived in Yangon. The team, along with over 100 rescue equipment, travelled to Naypyidaw to participate in rescue missions. On 30 March, China sent 17 trucks loaded with shelter and medical supplies to Mandalay. Beijing pledged another US$137 million in food, medicine, prefabricated homes, medical expenses, epidemic prevention and hazard evaluation groups on 10 April.
Finland	€1 million	Donation granted to the IFRC to assist internally displaced persons, especially women and girls, and people with disabilities.
France		France coordinated with international partners to deliver aid to Myanmar.
Germany		Germany coordinated with international partners to deliver aid to Myanmar.
Hong Kong		Sent a group of 51 search-and-rescue personnel and two rescue dogs. The team also carried nine tons of life detecting devices and an automatic satellite tracking antenna system among other critical items.
India		Operation Brahma: the Indian Air Force carried 15 tonnes of relief material containing essential shelter and medical supplies to Myanmar. India also established a field hospital in Mandalay with a capacity of 200 patients. The staff treated more than 100 patients and performed two critical surgeries within the first day.
Indonesia		Twelve tonnes of humanitarian relief and 39 military personnel were flown to Naypyidaw to assist medical needs, construct shelters and search for the missing. The National Alms Agency sent 100 generators, 50 tents, 10,000 sarongs, and 5,000 packages of women and children essentials. A search and rescue team consisting of 53 personnel was also dispatched by Indonesia. Three batches of humanitarian aid were delivered on 31 March, 1 April, and 3 April.
Ireland	€6 million	
Israel		A search and rescue team, led by Colonel Yossi Pinto, assisted local authorities in Thailand. The Israeli embassy sent a scanning device that was used to search for survivors at the State Audit Office building, while IsraAid deployed an emergency team.
Italy	€3.3 million	Italy allocated €3.3 million for emergency aid to Myanmar, providing support to the IFRC, Italian civil society organisations and NGOs. Italian Chamber of Deputies Minister Edmondo Cirielli approved an emergency contribution of €2 million to the IFRC with additional €1.3 million to various Italian civil society organisations for the crisis respond.
Japan	US$6 million	Deployed 450 tents, 240 waterproof sheets and a group of medical personnel to Myanmar.
Jersey	£300,000	
Laos		The defense ministry sent an emergency response team of 33 firefighters, 11 soldiers and other supporting staff to Myanmar.
Malaysia	US$2.3 million	Sent 50 members of Special Malaysia Disaster Assistance and Rescue Team relief personnel in Myanmar.
Netherlands		Sent two experts as part of a European team that will support aid to Myanmar through Thailand.
New Zealand	NZ$2 million	
Norway		Sent two experts as part of a European team that will support aid to Myanmar through Thailand.
Pakistan		The National Disaster Management Authority supplied 70 tons of relief materials. A second aid consignment consisting of 35 tons of essential goods was delivered by the Pakistani Embassy in Myanmar to the Yangon Region Government at Yangon International Airport on 6 April.
Philippines		Sent a 91-member Inter-Agency Humanitarian Contingent that consists of personnel from the Office of Civil Defense, Department of Health, Philippine Army, Philippine Air Force, Bureau of Fire Protection, Metropolitan Manila Development Authority, and the private sector.
Russia		The Ministry of Emergency Situations of the Russian Federation sent two aircraft with 120 doctors and rescue personnel to Myanmar. A mobile air hospital was established in Mandalay.
Singapore		Singapore Civil Defence Force sent an 80-member team to assist the rescue efforts in Myanmar.
South Korea	US$4 million	
Spain	€2 million	Sent €500,000 to the IFRC and €1.5 million to the Disaster Response Emergency Fund of IFRC.
Sri Lanka	US$1 million	Funds for humanitarian aid to assist with ongoing relief and recovery efforts and prepared medical teams and health sector assistance for deployment to Myanmar. The Temple of the Tooth announced LKR15 million in financial aid to Myanmar.
Sweden	158 kr million	
Switzerland	SFr 6 million	
Taiwan	US$50,000	The National Fire Agency offered 120 personnel and six dogs. The offer was declined and the team was disbanded.
Thailand		The Royal Thai Armed Forces said it would deploy a 49-member search and rescue team to Myanmar.
Timor-Leste	US$500,000	
United Arab Emirates		UAE President Sheikh Mohamed bin Zayed Al Nahyan directed a search and rescue team that made up of members of Abu Dhabi Police, the UAE National Guard and Joint Operations Command to help earthquake survivors in Myanmar.
United Kingdom	£10 million	
United States	US$9 million	United States President Donald Trump said the country will be sending aid to Myanmar, despite recent cuts on foreign aid. The embassy pledged up to US$2 million through local organizations. A team of three was sent to Myanmar for recovery efforts but they experienced difficulties with visa processing. While in Myanmar, they were informed of their job terminations which would occur in several months as part of the Trump administration's efforts to reduce foreign aid. According to Marcia Wong, a former USAID deputy administrator, these workers were sleeping in the open street. On 4 April, the United States pledged another US$7 million in shelter, food and water. In Thailand, the US Indo-Pacific Command deployed personnel to assist in rescue operations at the State Audit Office.
Vatican		Pope Francis sent humanitarian aid to victims of the earthquake in Myanmar via his employees despite the Pope's deteriorating health.
Vietnam	US$300,000	The Vietnam People's Army deployed an 80-member earthquake relief team. Twenty-six members of the Public Security Ministry began search and rescue operations in Sagaing on 31 March.

== See also ==
- Lists of earthquakes
- Lists of 21st-century earthquakes
- List of earthquakes in 2025
- List of earthquakes in Myanmar
- List of earthquakes in Thailand
