= Yedashe =

- Town
- Location in Burma
- Coordinates: 19°09′16″N 96°20′46″E
- Country: Myanmar
- Region: Bago
- District: Taungoo
- Township: Yedashe
- Time zone: UTC+6.30 (MST)

Yedashe is a town in Taungoo District, Bago Region in Myanmar. It is the administrative seat of Yedashe Township.Technological University Toungoo is located near this township.

== History ==
Yedashe was the site of the battle of Yedashe in the larger Battle of the Yunnan-Burma Road, on 5-8 April 1942.
