= Htantabin, Bago =

Town in Bago Region, Myanmar

Htantabin ထန်းတပင်မြို့
- Town
- Interactive map of Htantabin
- Coordinates: 18.843°N 96.488°E
- Country: Myanmar
- Region: Bago Region
- District: Taungoo District
- Township: Htantabin Township

Area
  - Total: 0.50 sq mi (1.3 km^{2})

Population (2019)
  - Total: 9,885
  - Density: 20,000/sq mi (7,600/km^{2})
- Time zone: UTC+6:30 (MMT)

Htantabin (Burmese: ထန်းတပင်မြို့) is a town in eastern Bago Region, central Myanmar. It is the seat of the Htantabin Township in the Taungoo District. The town is located on the eastern bank of the Sittaung River. The town was established in 1954 and its current borders were defined by an expansion in 2007. The town is currently subdivided 6 urban wards- Aung Mingala, Aung Chanthar, Thiri Yadanar, Aung Thukha and the newest Seikkyi wards.

The town's middle school hosted an anti-human trafficking information session in 2022.
