= Oktwin =

- Town
- Location in Myanmar
- Coordinates: 18°49′51″N 96°24′37″E
- Country: Myanmar
- Region: Bago Region
- District: Taungoo
- Township: Oktwin
- Time zone: UTC+6.30 (MST)

Oktwin is the principal town and administrative seat of Oktwin Township, in the Taungoo District in the Bago Region of Myanmar.
