= ASEAN Regional Forum Disaster Relief Exercise =

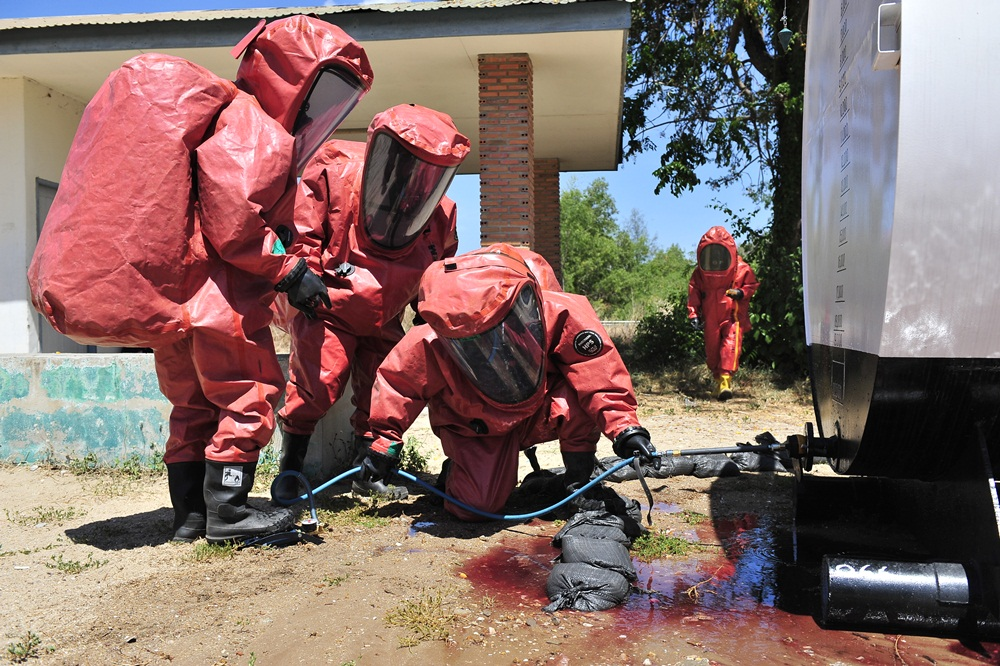
2013 ARF DiReX

The Asean Regional Forum Disaster Relief Exercise(ARF DiREx) is an international disaster drill designed to promote cooperation in the field of disaster relief between ASEAN Regional Forum 27 member countries of the ASEAN. It assumes large-scale disasters such as earthquakes and tsunamis, and conducts on-the-job and icon-based drills, such as exploration and medical support, by mobilizing national military assets.

== History ==
=== 1st ===
In May 2009, the Philippines and the United States jointly held in the Philippines

=== 2nd ===
In March 2011, Indonesia and Japan jointly held in Manado, North Sulawesi, Indonesia.

=== 3rd ===
Korea and Thailand jointly held training sessions at Phetchaburi Cha-am, Thailand, from May 7 to 11, 2013. [3] [4] About 1,200 civilian, military, and firefighting personnel from ARF Member States and Australia, Canada, China, India, Japan, New Zealand, Russia, the United States, Bangladesh, Sri Lanka, East Timor, and the European Union participated. The Regional and Humanitarian Secretariat (UNOCHA), including the ASEAN Secretariat, ASEAN Coordinating Centre for Humanitarian Assistance (AHA Centre), the World Health Organization, the International Red Cross Red Crescent (IFRC) and the Trilateral Cooperation Secretariat (TCS) attended as observers. Using a scenario of 8.9-magnitude earthquake and typhoon, disaster management agencies and emergency responders from civil and military institutions of ARF members exercised their coordination and disaster relief mechanisms.
