= Yedashe Township =

Township in Bago region, Myanmar

Coordinates: 19°09′22″N 96°20′45″E

- Township
- Location in Taungoo district
- Country: Myanmar
- Region: Bago Region
- District: Taungoo District
- Capital: Yedashe

Population (2014)
  - Total: 213,593
- Time zone: UTC+6.30 (MMT)

Yedashe Township is a township of Taungoo District in Bago Region, Myanmar. The principal town is Yedashe.
