= Pyu Township =

- Township
- Location in Taungoo district

- Location in Myanmar
- Coordinates: 18°29′N 96°19′E
- Country: Myanmar
- Region: Bago Region
- District: Taungoo
- Capital: Pyu
- Elevation: 156 m (512 ft)

Population (268868)
  - Total: 268,868
- Time zone: UTC+6:30 (MST)

Pyu Township is a township in Taungoo District in the Bago Region of Myanmar. The principal town and administrative seat is Pyu.
