= Pyu =

Phyu Phyuu
- Town
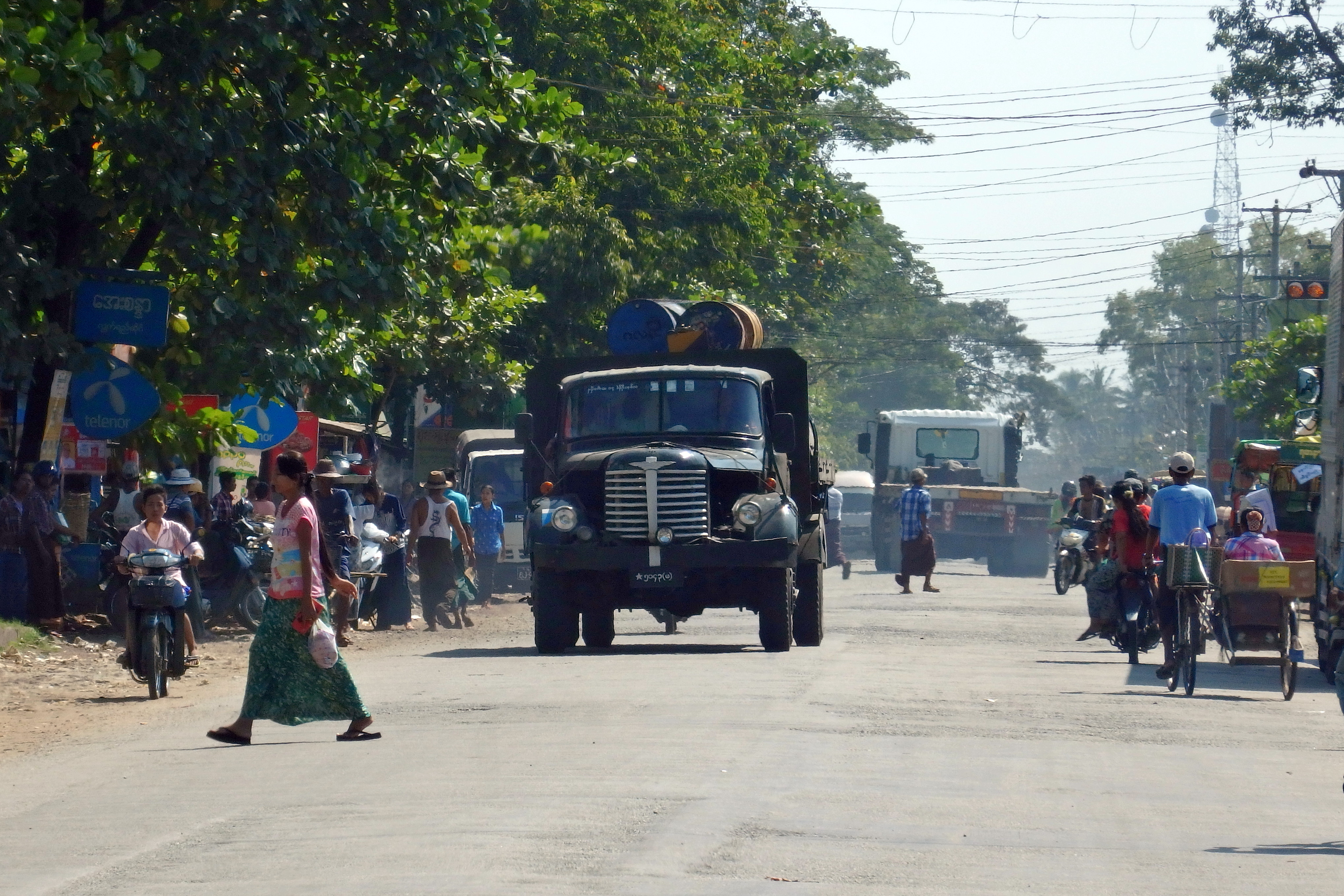

- Location in Burma
- Coordinates: 18°28′55″N 96°26′13″E
- Country: Myanmar
- Region: Bago Region
- District: Taungoo
- Township: Phyu

Population (2010)
  - Total: 44,642
- Time zone: UTC+6.30 (MST)
- Area code: 54

Pyu, also spelled Phyu or Phyuu, is a town in Taungoo District, Bago Region in Myanmar. It is the administrative seat of Phyu Township.The old Yangon-Mandalay highway passes through Phyu Township. In addition, the Phyu-Oakpyat-Mong-(Kyauk Gyi)-Htantabin-Taungoo road was built and Phyu became more prosperous. The new Yangon-Mandalay Expressway (AH-1) is also about 3 miles west of Phyu. The Yangon-Mandalay railway also runs through Phyu Township. Phyu is surrounded by the Sittaung River to the east and Bago Yoma to the west. Phyu Stream passes through the center of the city, and Kwin Stream is the southern boundary of Kyauktadakha Township. Phyu is located 156 feet above sea level.
