= Oktwin Township =

Township in Bago Region, Myanmar

- Township
- Location in Taungoo district
- Coordinates: 18°49′51″N 96°24′37″E
- Country: Myanmar
- Region: Bago Region
- District: Taungoo District
- Capital: Oktwin
- Time zone: UTC+6.30 (MST)

Oktwin Township is a township in Taungoo District in the Bago Region of Myanmar. The principal town is Oktwin.
