= Taungoo Township =

Township in Bago Region, Myanmar

Coordinates: 18°57′11″N 96°25′19″E

- Township
- Location in Taungoo district
- Country: Myanmar
- Region: Bago Region
- District: Taungoo District
- Capital: Taungoo
- Time zone: UTC+6.30 (MST)

Taungoo Township or Toungoo Township is a township in Taungoo District in the Bago Region of Myanmar. The principal town is Taungoo.
