= Htantabin Township, Bago =

Htantabin Township ထန်းတပင်မြို့နယ
- Township
- Location in Taungoo district

- Location in Myanmar
- Coordinates: 18°43′N 96°32′E
- Country: Myanmar
- Region: Bago Region
- District: Taungoo
- Capital: Htantabin
- Capital: Htantabin

Area
  - Total: 207.98 sq mi (538.7 km^{2})
- Elevation: 185 ft (56 m)

Population (2019)
  - Total: 122,774
  - Density: 590.32/sq mi (227.92/km^{2})
- Time zone: UTC+6.30 (MMT)

Htantabin Township is a township in Taungoo District in the Bago Region of Myanmar. The principal town and administrative seat is Htantabin in the far northwest part of the township, which comprises six urban wards. There are 29 village tracts and 107 villages in the township. The township is 67.3% Bamar with a sizeable Shan and Karen minority
