= ASEAN Coordinating Centre for Humanitarian Assistance =

AHA Centre
- ASEAN Coordinating Centre for Humanitarian Assistance
- Formation: 17 November 2011; 14 years ago
- Headquarters: East Jakarta, Indonesia
- Coordinates: 6.192724417639123°S 106.86861415663164°E
- Executive Director: Lee Yam Ming
- Parent organization: ASEAN
- Revenue: $4.3 million USD (2020)
- Website: ahacentre.org

The ASEAN Coordinating Centre for Humanitarian Assistance (AHA Centre) is an intergovernmental organisation, established by the ten ASEAN Member States to facilitate cooperation and coordination of disaster management amongst ASEAN member states. AHA Centre was established on 17 November 2011, and its headquarters are based in Jakarta, Indonesia. As of 2020, AHA Centre is led by Lee Yam Ming, the Singapore Civil Defence Force Assistant Commissioner. In 2020, AHA Centre had an annual revenue inflow of US$4.3 million.
