= Taungoo District =

Coordinates: 18°38′N 96°25′E

Taungoo District (also Taungngu, Toungoo, Burmese: တောင်ငူခရိုင်) is a district of the Bago Division in central Burma (Myanmar). The capital lies at Taungoo. This district covers an area of around 10,627 square kilometers (4,103 square miles).

location in Bago region

== History ==
Taungoo District was created by the Pagan Dynasty in the 1280s, and was much larger. It was ruled by appointed governors through succeeding dynasties. In 1510, Taungoo District briefly became the small, independent kingdom of Taunggyi. But within twenty years that kingdom soon controlled most of Burma, the capital was moved to Pegu, and Taungoo became a district again. By the mid-19th century, Taungoo was governed by a local governor appointed by the Konbaung kings. The Taungoo District consisted of 52 wards, including today's Pyinmana and Naypyidaw regions. The Taungoo District was cut in half after the Second Anglo-Burmese War. The British annexed the southern half, including the city of Taungoo while the northern portion, including Pyinmana and Ela, remained Burmese.

== Townships ==
Townships in Taungoo District Taungoo Township Oktwin Township Pyu Township Yedashe Township Tantabin Township

The district contains the following townships

- Oktwin
- Pyu
- Tantabin
- Taungoo
- Yedashe
