= 2022 Guatemala earthquake =

Earthquake in Guatemala

- Location within Escuintla Department Location within Guatemala
- UTC time: 2022-02-16 07:12:25
- ISC event: 622036563
- USGS-ANSS: ComCat
- Local date: February 16, 2022
- Local time: 01:12:25 UTC-6
- Magnitude: 6.2 M_{w}
- Depth: 83.6 km (52 mi)
- Epicenter: 14.193°N 91.297°W
- Areas affected: Guatemala
- Max. intensity: MMI VI (Strong)
- Landslides: Yes
- Casualties: 3 dead, 2 injured

The 2022 Guatemala earthquake occurred on the early morning of February 16, 2022 in the southern regions of Guatemala. The quake measured a moment magnitude of 6.2 and reached a peak intensity of VI (Strong) on the Modified Mercalli Intensity scale. Damage was widespread but light in and around the capital, Guatemala City, resulting mostly in cracked walls and rockslides.

== Tectonic setting ==
The coastline of Guatemala lies above the convergent boundary where the Cocos Plate is being subducted beneath the North American Plate or Caribbean Plate along the line of the Middle America Trench. Earthquakes associated with this plate boundary include the 7.4 M_{w} 2012 Guatemala earthquake that ruptured the plate interface, and the 6.9 M_{w} 2014 Mexico–Guatemala earthquake caused by faulting within the subducting Cocos Plate. The northern part of the country hosts the Motagua Fault and Chixoy-Polochic Fault, accommodating left-lateral strike-slip movement on the transform boundary between the North American and Caribbean plates. The Motagua Fault was the source of many destructive earthquakes in Northern Guatemala, most notably the 1976 Guatemala earthquake with a magnitude of 7.5 M_{w}.

== Earthquake ==
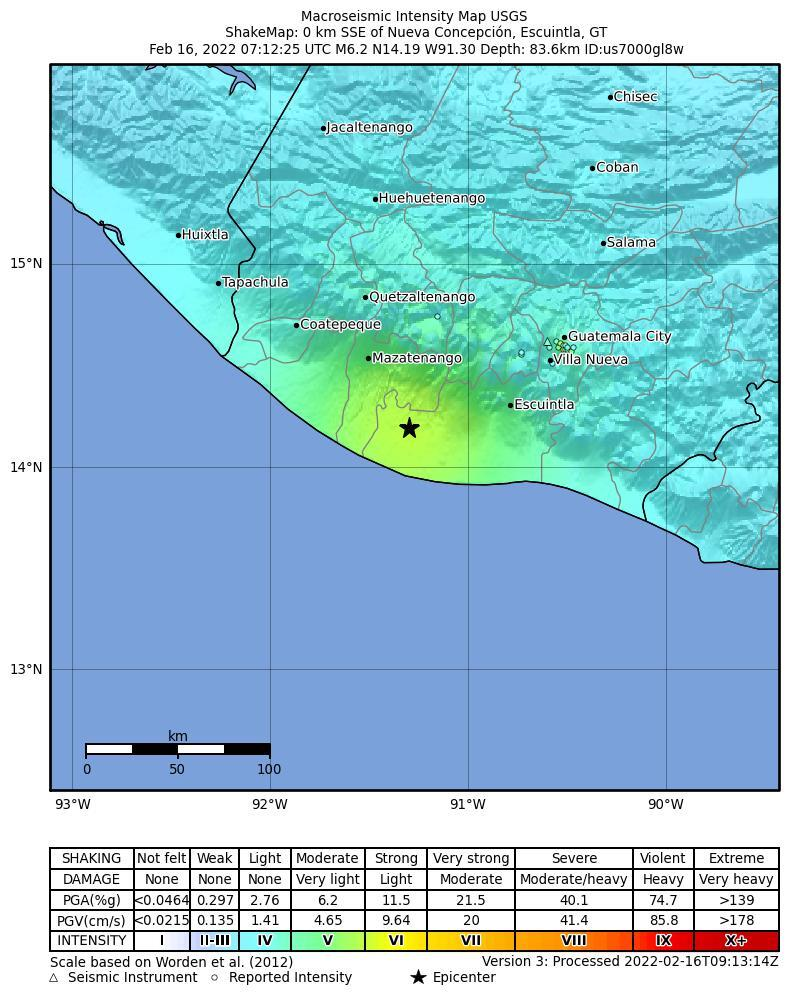
USGS ShakeMap of the event

The earthquake had a preliminary magnitude of 6.8 according to local seismological agencies but was later revised to 6.2 in the moment magnitude scale by the United States Geological Survey (USGS). The quake, at a depth of 83.6 km (52 mi), reached a peak intensity of VI (Strong) on the Modified Mercalli intensity scale.

Modified Mercalli intensities in selected locations
MMI	Locations	Population exposure
MMI VI (Strong)	Nueva Concepción	441,000
MMI V (Moderate)	Quetzaltenango, Guatemala City, Escuintla	4.62 million
MMI IV (Light)	Chimaltenango, Santa Ana	13.4 million

== Damage and casualties ==
The earthquake caused damage in seven departments of the country. It damaged or destroyed 39 houses and buildings in and around the capital, Guatemala City, and caused multiple landslides blocking roads near the mountains. Three people suffered fatal heart attacks, one each in Mixco, Quetzaltenango, and Baja Verapaz, while two people, including a minor, suffered injuries.

== See also ==
- List of earthquakes in 2022
- List of earthquakes in Guatemala
