= 2025 Guatemala earthquakes =

Earthquake in Guatemala

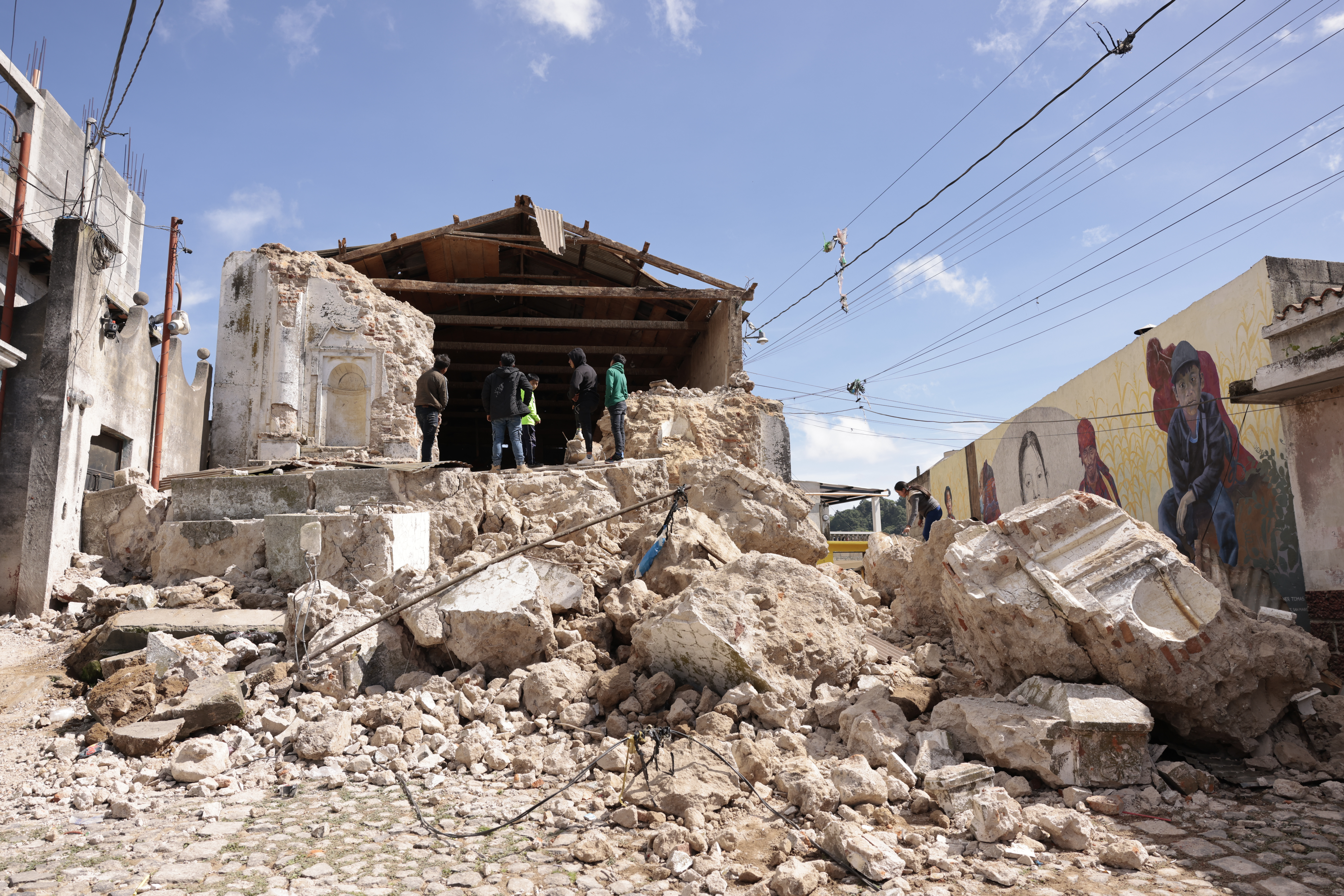
- A collapsed church in Santa María de Jesús

- Location within Guatemala
- UTC time: 2025-07-08 21:41:30
- ISC event: 643658001
- USGS-ANSS: ComCat
- Local date: 8 July 2025
- Local time: 15:41:30 CST (UTC-6)
- Duration: 30 seconds
- Magnitude: M_{w} 5.7
- Depth: 10 km (6 mi)
- Epicenter: 14.440°N 90.655°W
- Fault: Jalpatagua Fault
- Type: Strike-slip
- Areas affected: Guatemala
- Max. intensity: MMI VII (Very strong)
- Landslides: Yes
- Foreshocks: M_{w} 4.8 on 8 July 2025
- Aftershocks: 37+ recorded mb 4.8 on 8 July 2025 (Strongest)
- Casualties: 7 fatalities, 300 injuries

On 8 July 2025, a swarm of earthquakes struck Guatemala, with the largest having a magnitude of 5.7 M_{w} and located 3 km (1.9 mi) from the town of Amatitlán, and 20 km (12 mi) from the capital Guatemala City. The earthquake led to at least 7 deaths and 300 injuries, in addition to causing severe damage to buildings across six departments in the south of the country.

== Tectonic setting ==
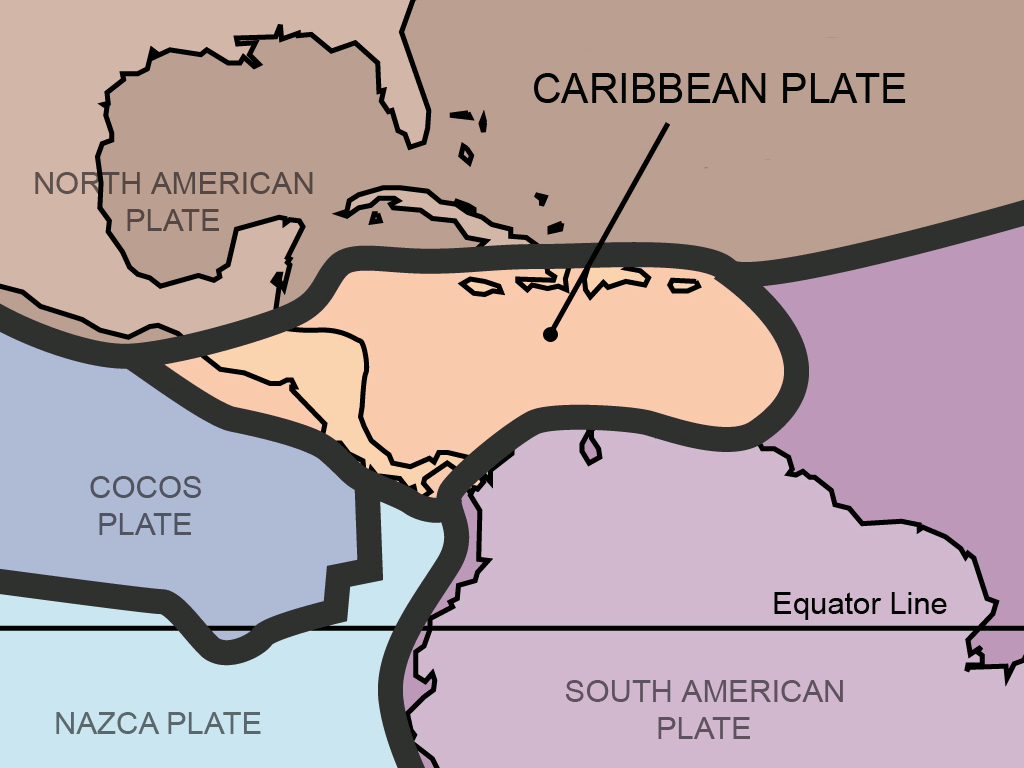
Map of different faults in the Caribbean

The coastline of Guatemala lies above the convergent boundary where the Cocos Plate is being subducted beneath the North American Plate or Caribbean Plate along the line of the Middle America Trench. Earthquakes associated with this plate boundary include a M_{w} 7.4 quake that ruptured the plate interface in 2012, and a M_{w} 6.9 earthquake caused by faulting within the subducting Cocos Plate in 2014. The northern part of the country hosts the Motagua Fault and Chixoy-Polochic Fault, accommodating left-lateral strike-slip movement on the transform boundary between the North American and Caribbean plates. The Motagua Fault was the source of many destructive earthquakes in Northern Guatemala, most notably a magnitude 7.5 event in 1976.

== Earthquakes ==
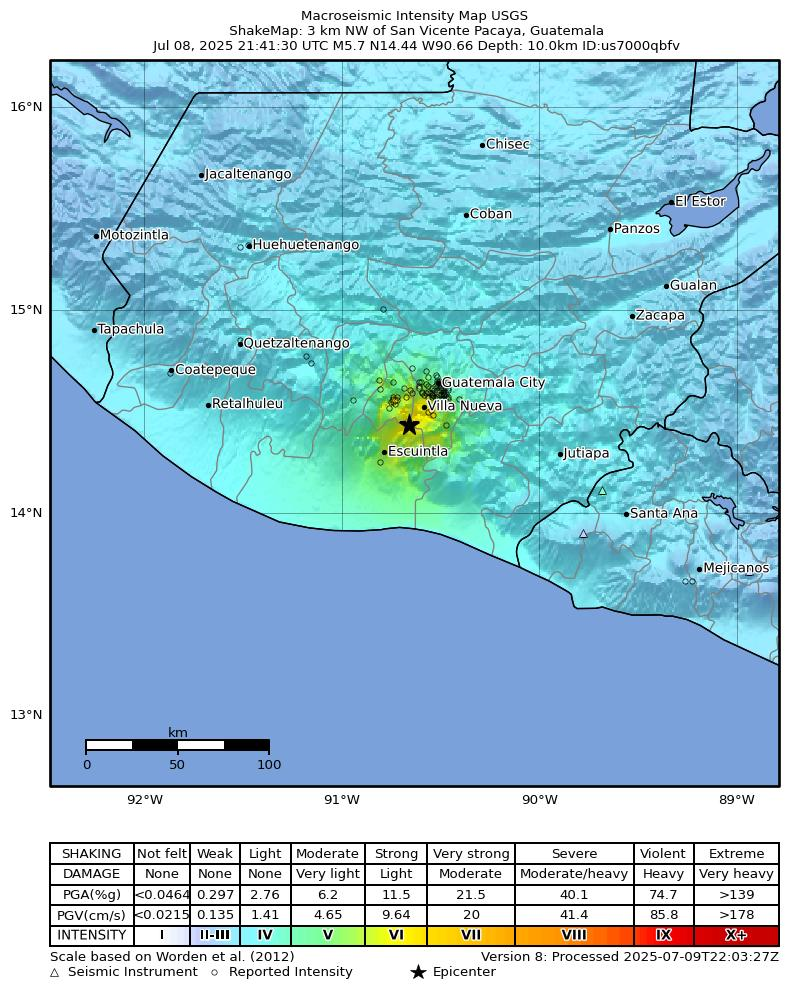
USGS ShakeMap

The mainshock of the sequence measured 5.7 on the moment magnitude scale, and had an epicenter located in Escuintla Department, 3 km (1.9 mi) from the town of Amatitlan. It struck 10.0 km (6.2 mi) below the surface, and had a maximum Modified Mercalli intensity of VII (Very Strong) in San Vicente Pacaya, Amatitlán and Palín, VI (Strong) in Santa María de Jesús, Escuintla, Antigua, Petapa, and Ciudad Vieja, V (Moderate) in Guatemala City and Chimaltenango, IV (Light) in Quetzaltenango, and III (Weak) in Santa Ana and Santa Tecla, El Salvador. The quake was preceded by a M_{w} 4.8 foreshock about 30 minutes before and was followed by more than 37 aftershocks, including one that struck 13 minutes later that also measured 4.8 mb. As of 15 July, a total of 1,001 earthquakes have been recorded since the start of the sequence, with 36 of them being felt.

== Damage and casualties ==
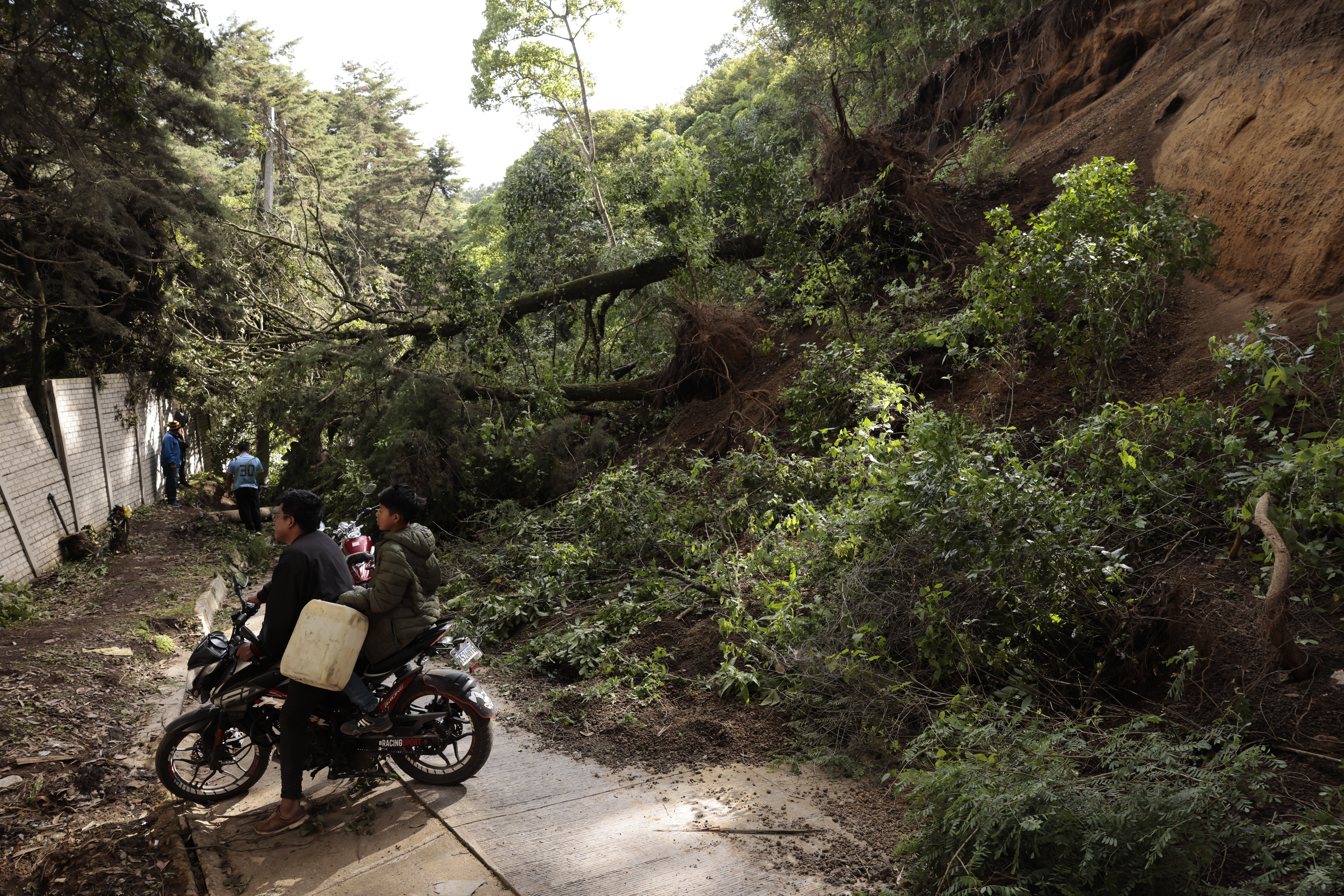
Large landslides caused by the earthquake in Santa María de Jesús

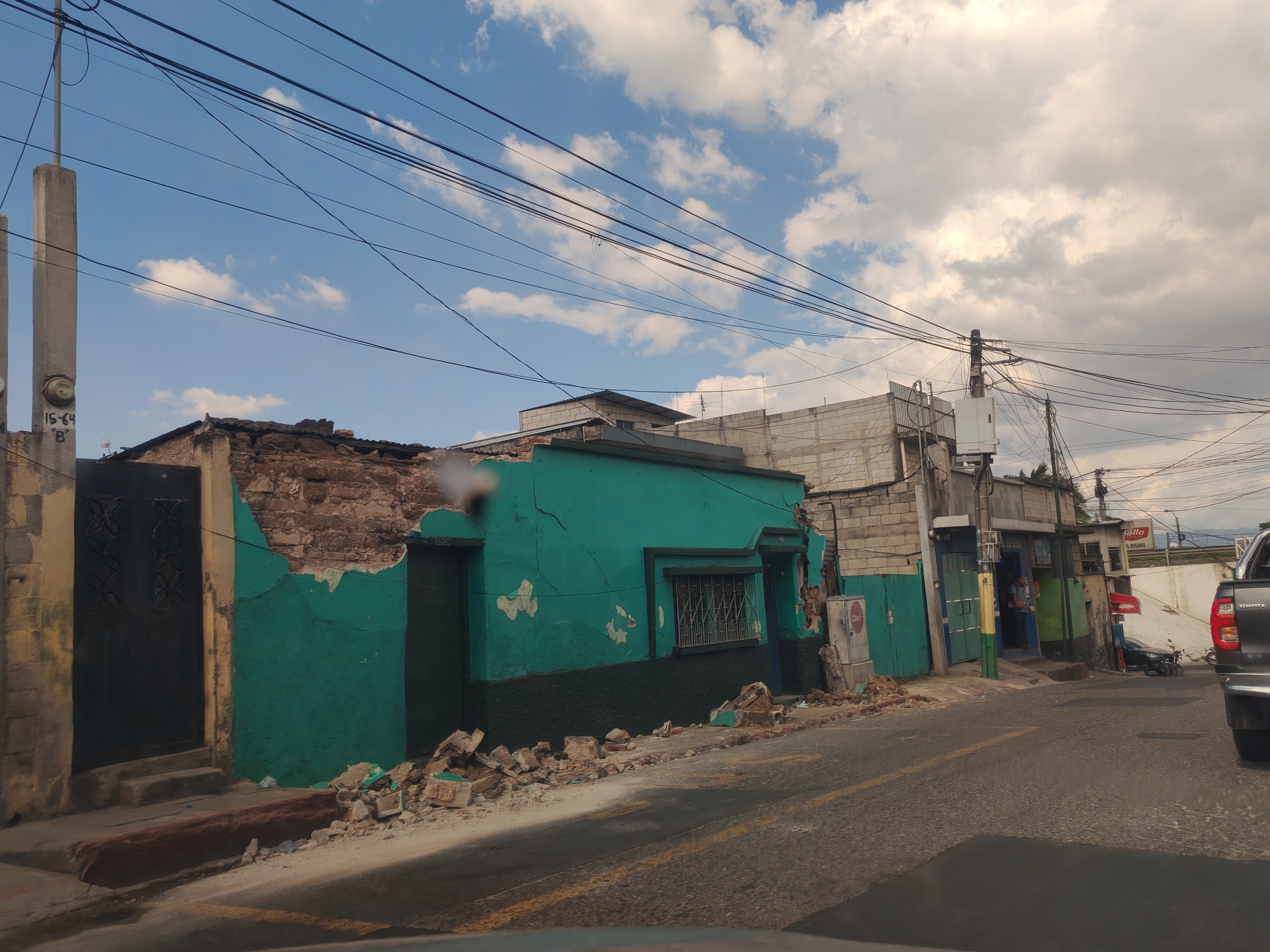
Damage to a home in Amatitlán

At least seven fatalities were reported due to the earthquake, most of them in Santa María de Jesús, Sacatepéquez Department, while 300 people were injured. About 50% of the town's homes were thought to have been damaged or destroyed, with the town's mayor saying that most of the affected buildings were old and made of adobe. A father and his son traveling from Palín to Santa María de Jesús, Sacatepéquez died when their pickup truck was struck by a rockslide. A man in Santa María de Jesús was rescued after being buried by a landslide while riding on his motorcycle, and a woman in Villa Nueva died after being buried by another landslide along with her dog. One person also died from a heart attack in his residence in Santa Inés, near Antigua Guatemala.

More than 2,145 homes were reportedly affected, of which 201 were severely damaged and 25 were in risk of collapse. Additionally, nine health centers, 13 public buildings, 62 schools, 31 roads, a highway and a bridge were impacted. At least 1,953 people were affected, of which 323 were left homeless. In Amatitlán and Antigua Guatemala, several homes were damaged or destroyed and a church at Santa María de Jesús was severely damaged. Santa María de Jesús was isolated following a landslide on the RD-SAC-01 highway. Water and electricity outages also occurred. In Palín, more than 300 homes, the old municipal building, and a church were damaged and a landslide occurred. In San Vicente Pacaya, more than 300 homes were damaged and the main access road to the municipality was blocked by a landslide. In the capital Guatemala City, one house collapsed and a building was severely damaged. A health center was damaged in Joyabaj, Quiche. Some damage was also reported from the departments of Baja Verapaz and Chimaltenango. Power, telephone, and internet services were disrupted in towns near the epicenter, with electric services fully restored in Santa María de Jesús two days after the quake. The National Hospital of Amatitlán suspended operations due to earthquake damage, while its patients were evacuated to Villa Nueva. A building within the complex was subsequently recommended for demolition.

== Response and aftermath ==
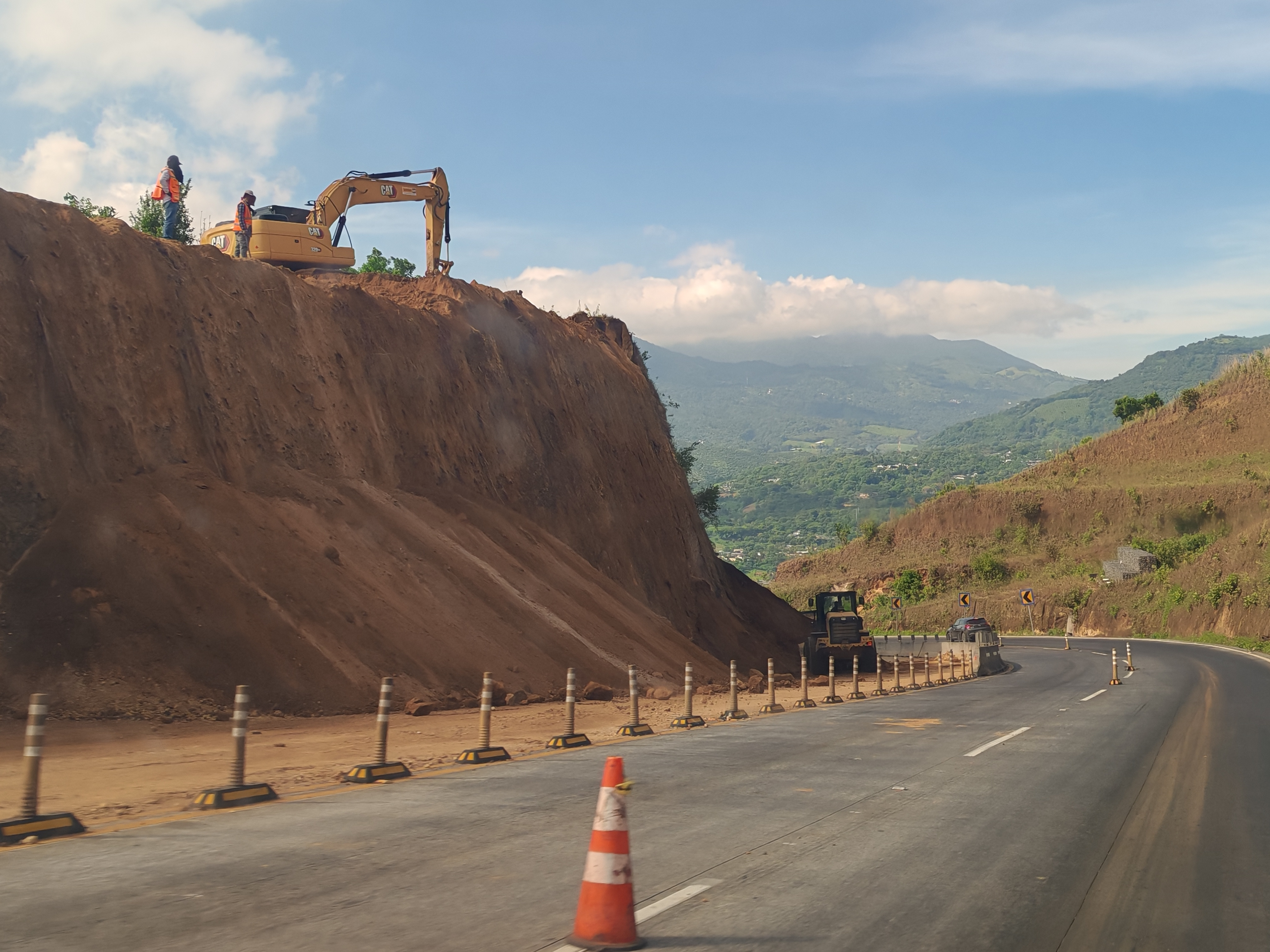
People respond to landslides in Villa Nueva.

Following the earthquake, the National Coordinator for Disaster Reduction (CONRED) declared an orange alert, the second-highest on Guatemala's emergency scale. The Guatemala International Book Fair suspended operations on 9 July. Schools and some offices in Guatemala, Escuintla and Sacatepéquez Departments were also closed on 9 July. President Bernardo Arévalo also went to Santa María de Jesús to inspect the damage and met with affected residents. CONRED and the Guatemalan Army were deployed in creating alternate access routes to the town, while supplies were delivered by air.

On the night of 10 July, gunshots and fires broke out in Santa María de Jesús as residents pursued suspected looters targeting neighborhoods whose inhabitants were displaced by the earthquake. Five of those suspected were detained and lynched by local residents, with one of them reportedly set on fire.

== See also ==
- List of earthquakes in 2025
- List of earthquakes in Guatemala
