= 1942 Guatemala earthquake =

Earthquake off southern coast of Guatemala

- Location within Central America
- UTC time: 1942-08-06 23:37:02
- ISC event: 900408
- USGS-ANSS: ComCat
- Local date: August 6, 1942
- Local time: 17:37
- Magnitude: M_{w} 7.7; M_{s} 7.9
- Depth: 35 km (22 mi)
- Epicenter: 13.78°N 90.91°W
- Areas affected: Guatemala, Mexico, El Salvador
- Casualties: 38 killed

The 1942 Guatemala earthquake occurred at 17:37 local time on August 6 and had ratings of 7.7 on the moment magnitude scale and 7.9 on the surface-wave magnitude scale. The epicenter was located off the southern coast of Guatemala, and it was one of the strongest earthquakes ever recorded there.

The earthquake caused widespread damage in the west-central highlands of Guatemala. Thirty-eight people died in the earthquake. Landslides caused by the combination of the earthquake and the heavy seasonal rains destroyed roads, the Inter-American Highway, and telegraph lines. In Tecpán, in the department of Chimaltenango, more than 60% of the houses were demolished. Damage was reported in some buildings in Antigua Guatemala, including the Palacio de Los Capitanes Generales and some catholic churches. The earthquake could also be felt strongly in Mexico and El Salvador.

This earthquake was a lower crustal intraplate earthquake with a compressional focal mechanism. Tensional activity has been dominant along the down-dip edge along the 1942 rupture zone. It was estimated that earthquakes near the Middle America Trench with magnitudes of about 7.5~8.0 occurred at intervals of 94 ± 54 yrs in southwestern Guatemala. Such historical earthquakes included the earthquakes in 1765, 1902, and 1942.

== See also ==
- List of earthquakes in 1942
- List of earthquakes in Guatemala
