= List of earthquakes in Guatemala =

Earthquakes in Guatemala
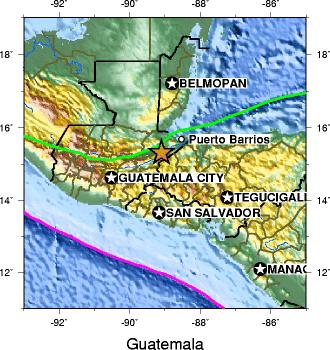
- Motagua Fault (green line) and the Middle America Trench (pink line)
- Largest: M_{w} 7.9 1942 Guatemala earthquake
- Deadliest: M_{w} 7.5 1976 Guatemala earthquake

Earthquakes are relatively frequent occurrences in Guatemala. The country lies in a major fault zone known as the Motagua and Chixoy-Polochic fault complex, which cuts across Guatemala and forms the tectonic boundary between the Caribbean plate and the North American plate. In addition, along Guatemala's western coast line, the Cocos plate pushes against the Caribbean plate, forming a subduction zone known as the Middle America Trench located approximately 50 km off Guatemala's Pacific coast. This subduction zone led to the formation of the Central America Volcanic Arc, and is an important source of offshore earthquakes. Both these major tectonic processes have generated deformations within the Caribbean plate and produced secondary fault zones, like the Mixco, Jalpatagua, and Santa Catarina Pinula faults.

The most destructive earthquake in recent Guatemalan history was the 1976 quake with a magnitude of 7.5 M_{w} and a hypocenter depth of just 5 km. This shallow-focus earthquake, originating from the Motagua Fault, caused 23,000 fatalities, leaving 76,000 injured and causing widespread material damage. Surprisingly, the 7.9 M_{w} earthquake of 1942, though higher in magnitude, was much less destructive, in part because of its substantially deeper hypocenter depth of 60 km.

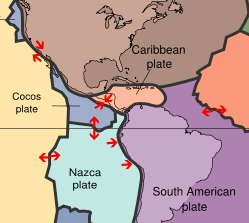
Plate tectonics in the Americas

A number of earthquakes with low magnitudes caused major damage in very localized areas, which may in part be explained by their relatively shallow depth. This was the case with the 1985 Uspantán earthquake of 5.0 M_{w} with a depth of 5 km, which destroyed most buildings in the town of Uspantán, but caused little or no damage in the rest of the country.

== Earthquakes ==
Guatemala is in constant earthquake activity. However, there are some earthquakes that are more notable due to the damage they have caused. Notable earthquakes in recent Guatemalan history include the following:

Date	Event	Location	Mag.	MMI	Deaths	Notes
2025-07-08	2025 Guatemala earthquakes	Escuintla	5.7 M_{w}	VII	7	Severe damage
2022-02-16	2022 Guatemala earthquake	Nueva Concepción, Escuintla	6.2 M_{w}	VI	3	Several houses damaged
2017-06-14	2017 Guatemala earthquake	San Marcos	6.9 M_{w}	VI	5	Landslides
2014-07-07	2014 Mexico–Guatemala earthquake	Antigua Guatemala	6.9 M_{w}	VIII	5	
2013-09-07	2013 Guatemala earthquake	Quetzaltenango	6.7 M_{w}	VI	1	
2012-11-07	2012 Guatemala earthquake	Retalhuleu	7.4 M_{w}	VII	139	Heavy damage in San Marcos
2011-09-19	2011 Cuilapa earthquake	Cuilapa	5.6 M_{w}	VI	1	
2009-05-28	2009 Swan Islands earthquake	Swan Islands, Honduras	7.3 M_{w}	VII		35 buildings destroyed and 80 were damaged in Izabal
2001-01-13	January 2001 El Salvador earthquake	San Miguel	7.7 M_{w}	VIII	8	Epicenter in San Miguel, El Salvador
1998-01-10	1998 Guatemala earthquake	Santo Domingo Suchitepéquez	6.6 M_{w}	VI–VIII		Buildings damaged in Quetzaltenango and San Marcos
1995-12-19	1995 Guatemala earthquake	Tucurú	5.3 M_{w}	IV	1	
1993-09-10	1993 Chiapas earthquake	San Marcos	7.2 M_{w}		1	Landslide/Rockslide.
1991-09-11	1991 Guatemala earthquake	Pochuta	5.3 M_{w}	VII	25	Major damage in San Miguel Pochuta
1988-11-03	1988 Guatemala earthquake	San Vicente Pacaya	6.0 M_{w}	VI	5	
1985-10-11	1985 Guatemala earthquake	Uspantán	5.0 M_{w}	VII		Major damage in Uspantán
1979-10-27	1979 Guatemala earthquake	Chimaltenango	6.8 M_{w}		4	
1978-07-29	1978 Patzún earthquake	Patzún	4.5 M_{s}		17	
1976-03-12	March 1976 Guatemala earthquake	Chimaltenango	5.1 M_{w}	VII	4	Aftershock.
1976-02-04	1976 Guatemala earthquake	Guatemala City, Belize	7.5 M_{w}	IX	23,000	Extreme damage, see also Motagua Fault
1959-02-20	1959 Guatemala earthquake	Ixcán				
1942-07-06	1942 Guatemala earthquake	Escuintla	7.7 M_{w}	IX	38	Landslides.
1918-01-04	1918 Guatemala earthquake	Guatemala City	6.0 M_{w}	VI		
1917-12-26	1917 Guatemala earthquake	Antigua Guatemala, Guatemala City	5.6 M_{w}	VII–IX	2,650	
1914-03-08	1913 Guatemala earthquake	Cuilapa	5.0 M_{s}		60	Destroyed the town of Cuilapa
1902-04-18	1902 Guatemala earthquake	Quetzaltenango, Guatemala City	7.5 M_{w}	IX	800–2,000	see also 1902 eruption of Santa María
1816-07-22	1816 Guatemala earthquake	Alta Verapaz	7.5 M_{w}	IX	23	see also Chixoy-Polochic Fault
1773-07-29	1773 Guatemala earthquake	Antigua Guatemala	7.5 M_{w}	VII–VIII	500–600	Severe damage in Antigua Guatemala and left most of the city in rubble.
1765-10-24	1765 Guatemala earthquake	Ostuncalco, Quetzaltenango	7.6–8.2 M_{i}	VII		Duration of shaking reported at 7–8 minutes.
1751	1751 Guatemala earthquake	Antigua Guatemala		IX		
1717-09-29	1717 Guatemala earthquake	Antigua Guatemala	7.4 M_{i}	IX		

MM = Intensity on the Modified Mercalli intensity scale

== Gallery ==
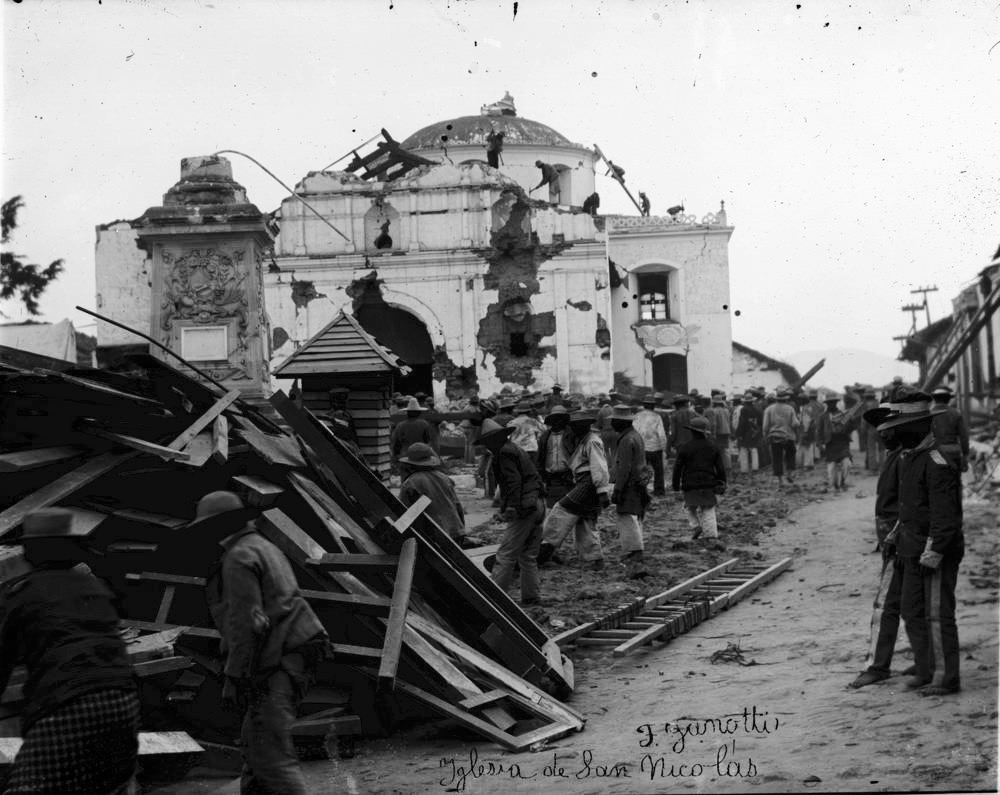
1902 Guatemala earthquake

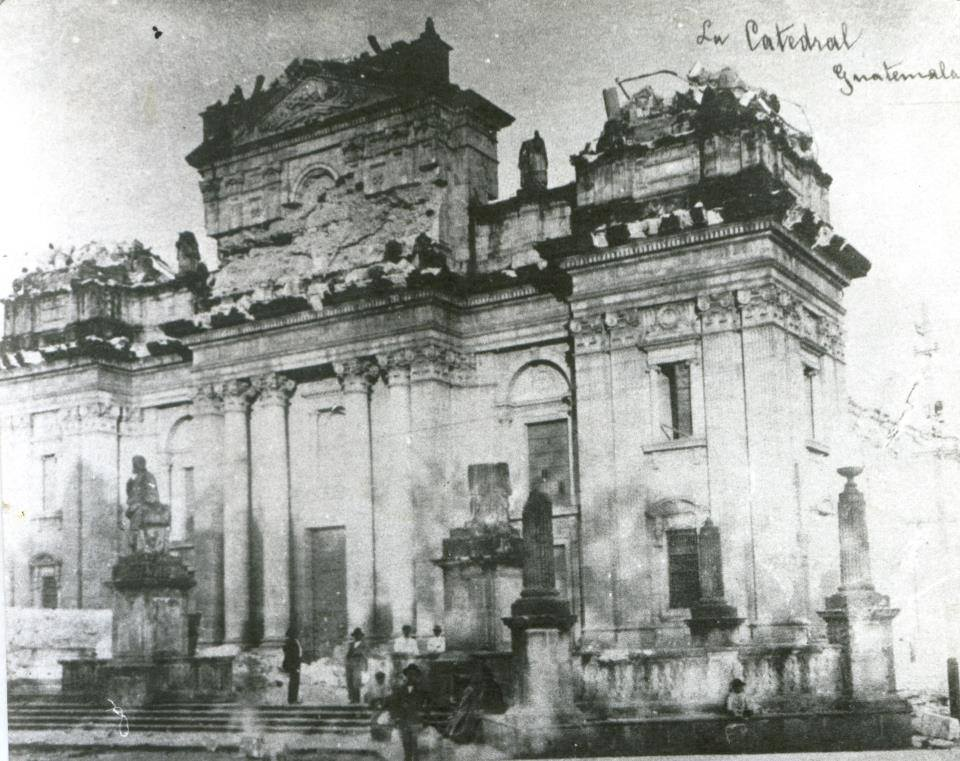
1917 Guatemala earthquake

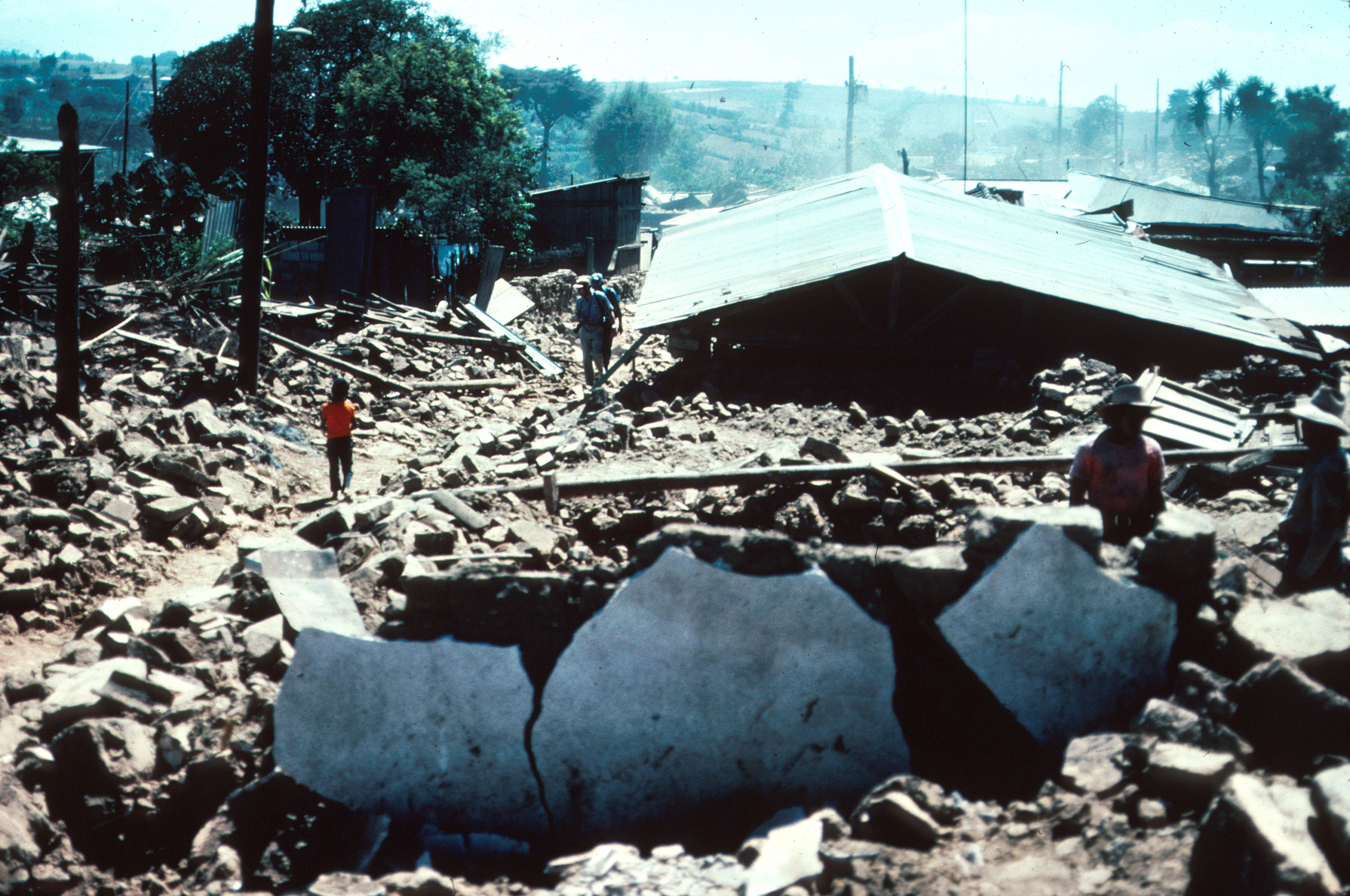
1976 Guatemala earthquake

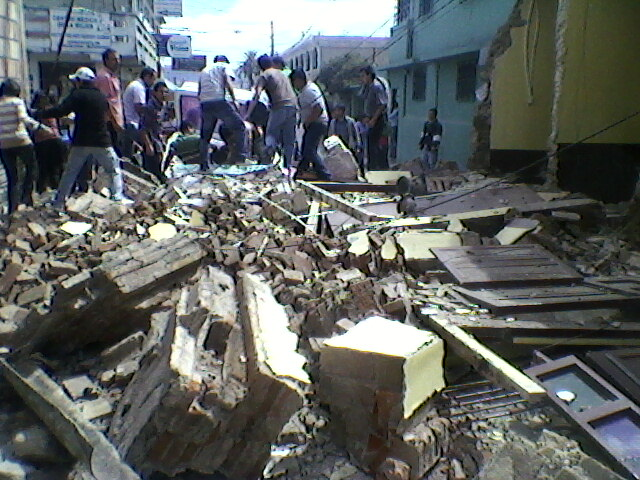
2012 Guatemala earthquake

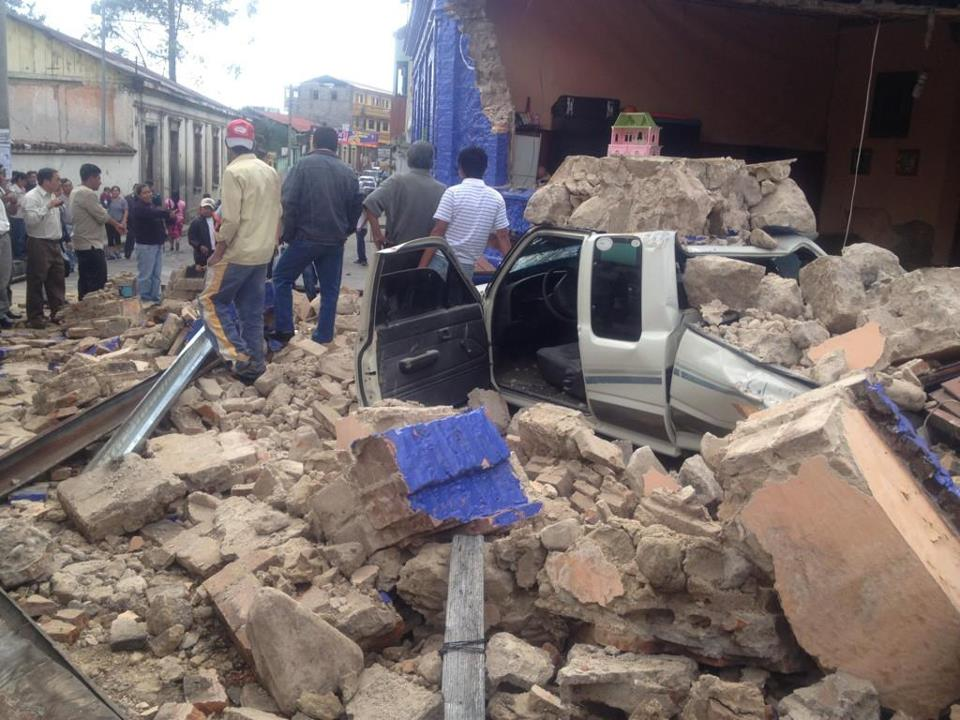
2017 Guatemala earthquake

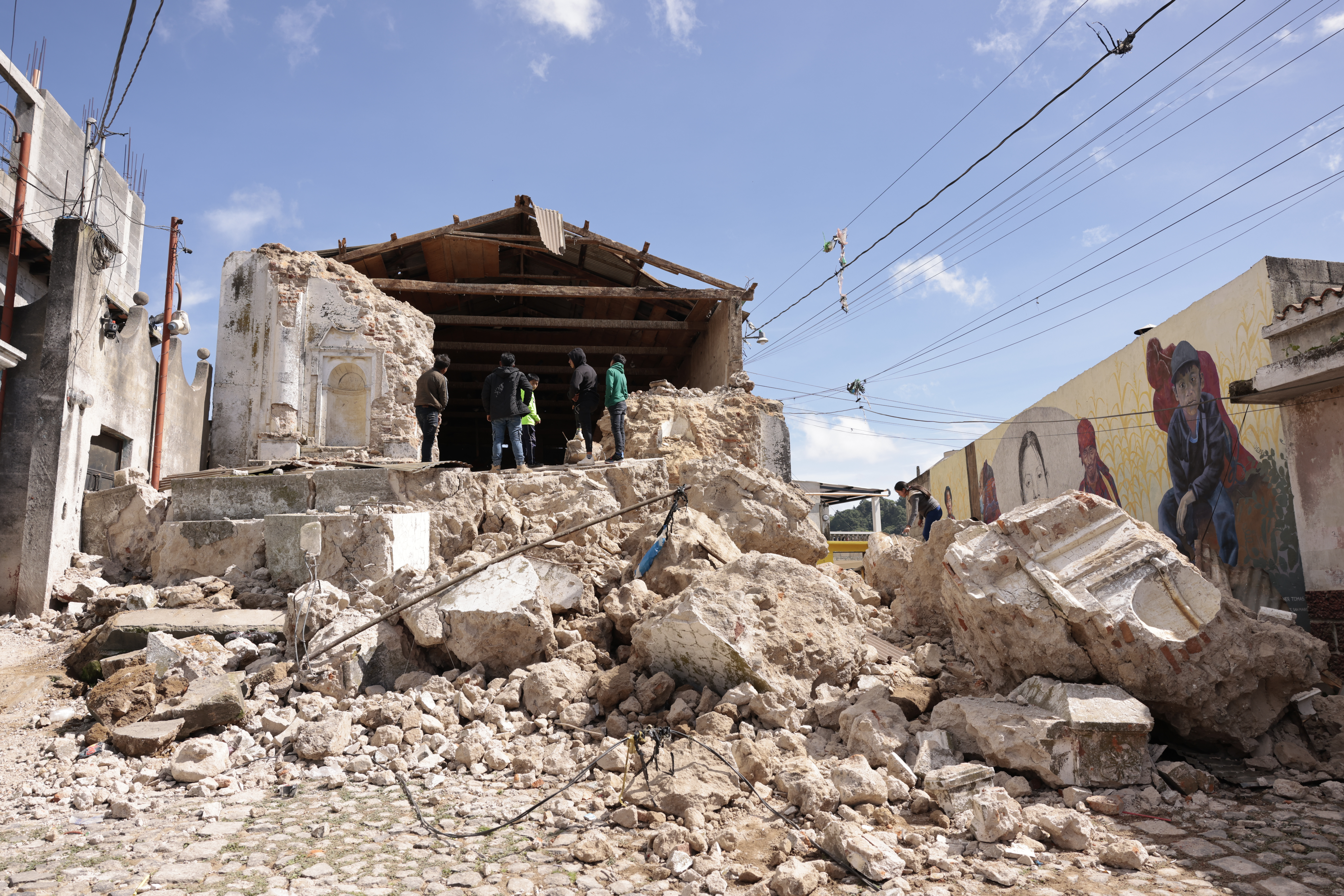
2025 Guatemala earthquakes

== See also ==
- Chixoy-Polochic Fault
- Geography of Guatemala
- Motagua Fault
