= 1991 Guatemala earthquake =

February 1976 earthquake in Guatemala

- Location within Guatemala
- UTC time: 1991-09-18 09:48:13
- ISC event: 320287
- USGS-ANSS: ComCat
- Local date: September 18, 1991
- Local time: 03:48
- Magnitude: M_{w} 6.2
- Depth: 10 kilometres (6 mi)
- Epicenter: 14.646°N 90.986°W
- Type: Strike-slip
- Areas affected: Guatemala
- Max. intensity: MMI VII (Very strong)
- Casualties: 25 fatalities, >200 injured

The 1991 Guatemala earthquake occurred on September 18 at 3:48 a.m. local time. The epicenter was 60 miles southwest of Guatemala City. The shock was assigned a magnitude of 5.3 on the Richter scale, later assigned with a magnitude of 6.2. It caused 25 deaths, over 200 injuries and left 1,000 people without homes.

The coastline of Guatemala lies above the convergent boundary where the Cocos plate is being subducted beneath the North American plate or Caribbean plate along the line of the Middle America Trench. The northern part of the country hosts the Motagua Fault and Chixoy-Polochic Fault, The Motagua Fault was the source of many destructive earthquakes in Northern Guatemala, most notably the 1976 Guatemala earthquake with a magnitude of 7.5.

== See also ==
- List of earthquakes in 1991
- List of earthquakes in Guatemala
