= 2017 Guatemala earthquake =

Two earthquakes in Guatemala

June 2017 Guatemala earthquakes
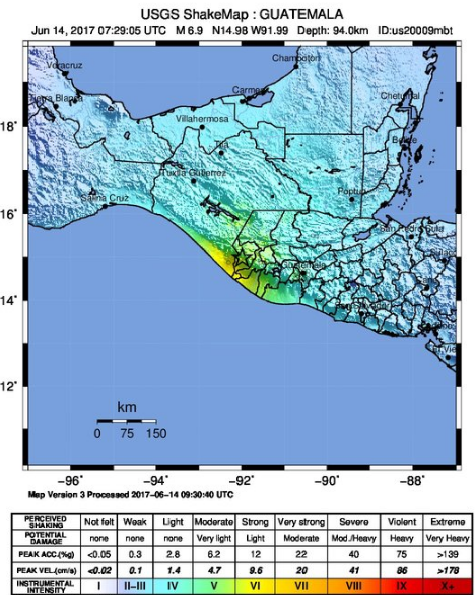
- Seismographic map of 2017 Guatemala earthquake

- Location within Guatemala
- UTC time: 2017-06-14 07:29:04
- 2017-06-22 12:31:03
- ISC event: 616639690
- 611834165
- USGS-ANSS: ComCat
- ComCat
- Local date
- 14 June 2017
- 22 June 2017
- Local time
- 1:29:04
- 6:31:03
- Magnitude: 6.9 M_{w}
- 6.8 M_{w}
- Depth: 93.0 km (58 mi)
- 38.1 km (24 mi)
- Epicenter: 14.909°N 92.009°W
- Type: Normal; Thrust
- Areas affected: Guatemala and Mexico
- Max. intensity: MMI VII (Very strong)
- Landslides: Yes
- Casualties: 5 dead, 30 injured 4 injured

The 2017 Guatemala earthquake struck near the city of Malacatán in the San Marcos Department, near the Guatemala–Mexico border at 1:29 am local time (UTC−06:00) on June 14. The earthquake killed five people, and caused 30 injuries, 11 of which were from Chiapas, Mexico across the border. No tsunami warning was issued.

The earthquake was followed up by a large M_{w}6.8 earthquake on June 22 off the coast of the Escuintla Department although both events are not directly related. There were no fatalities but four people were injured and damage reported.

== Tectonic setting ==
The Middle America Trench is a destructive plate boundary where the oceanic Cocos plate subducts beneath the Caribbean plate off the Guatemalan coast. This subduction zone runs from Mexico to Costa Rica where large earthquakes have been sourced from. At the same time, the Cocos plate bends and flexes before descending beneath the Caribbean plate thus faults break out within the downgoing slab, producing intraslab earthquakes.

== Earthquake ==
The magnitude 6.9 earthquake struck at an intermediate depth of 93 km under the Sierra Madre de Chiapas range, at the front of Volcán Tajumulco. It did not occur on the interface of the megathrust fault. Rather, it was a normal fault earthquake within the Cocos Slab.

As for the 6.8 earthquake on June 22, it originated on the megathrust boundary at a much shallow depth, but because the earthquake was offshore, shaking was less intense.

== Damage ==
A woman in San Marcos was killed by a collapsing wall while a homeless man in San Sebastian Retalhuleu died after being crushed during the collapse of a church. Heart attacks attributed to the earthquake claimed the lives of three women that morning. The earthquake collapsed some homes and triggered landslides that blocked roads and caused some injuries. It was strongly felt in Chiapas, Mexico where the quake further injured 11 people. Several homes collapsed and at least 20 had sustained damage. Six schools and two government buildings were damaged.

The earthquake of 22 June caused some damage to Antigua Guatemala, a UNESCO World Heritage Site that was the former capital before that status was moved to Guatemala City. The earthquake caused panic in El Salvador, where people fled to the streets. It triggered minor landslides and cracked adobe buildings.

== See also ==
- List of earthquakes in 2017
- List of earthquakes in Guatemala
- List of earthquakes in El Salvador
