= 1902 eruption of Santa María =

VEI 6 volcanic eruption in Guatemala

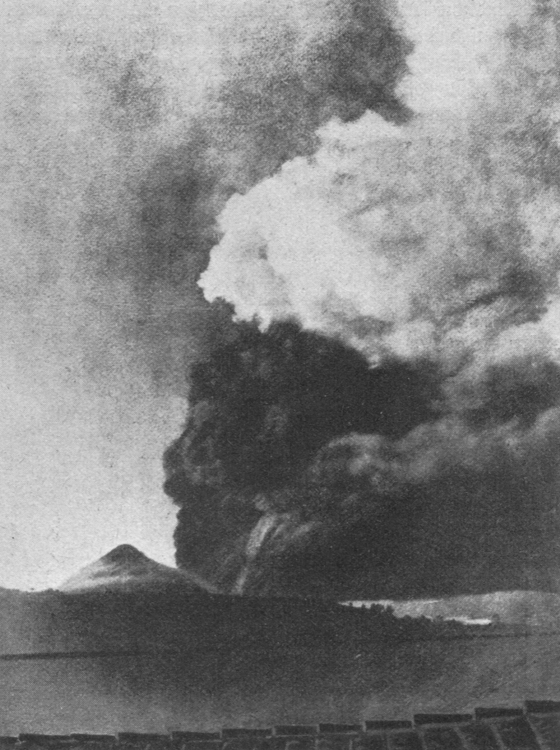
- Eruption column
- Volcano: Santa María
- Start date: October 24, 1902
- End date: November 12, 1902
- Type: Plinian
- Location: Guatemala; 14°45′25″N 91°33′07″W
- VEI: 6
- Deaths: 5,000–8,700

The 1902 eruption of Santa María was one of the largest eruptions of the 20th century, measuring a six on the volcanic explosivity index. The main eruption began on 24 October 1902 and lasted no more than 20 hours. Prior to its catastrophic eruption, Santa María had no record of an eruption. The eruption killed between 5,000 and 8,700 people. Immediate knowledge about the eruption was suppressed by President Manuel Estrada Cabrera due to the occurrence of a propaganda festival at around the same time of the eruption. Aid did not reach the affected areas immediately and only arrived in December.

== Background ==
The formation of Santa María occurred approximately 30,000 years BP, constructing the present cone to a volume of 20 km^{3} (4.8 cu mi). It comprise predominantly of basaltic andesites and pyroclastic material. It is part of a large volcanic belt that straddles the Pacific coast of Middle America. Prior to the 1902 eruption, there were no historical records of activity on the volcano. It was previously considered extinct.

In early 1902, Guatemala was affected by a series of damaging earthquakes; the first in this sequence occurring on 18 January. This event affected San Martín and the country's Pacific coastal region. Quezaltenango and San Marcos were razed during the 18 April earthquake, which was also the largest of the sequence and killing 1,000 people. This event caused major damage to buildings and was felt in other countries. The epicenter of the April shock was thought to be near Santa María. A series of local earthquakes occurring with high frequency was felt within the volcano's vicinity for six weeks. Another major shock occurred on 23 September that was felt as far as Mexico.

== Eruption ==
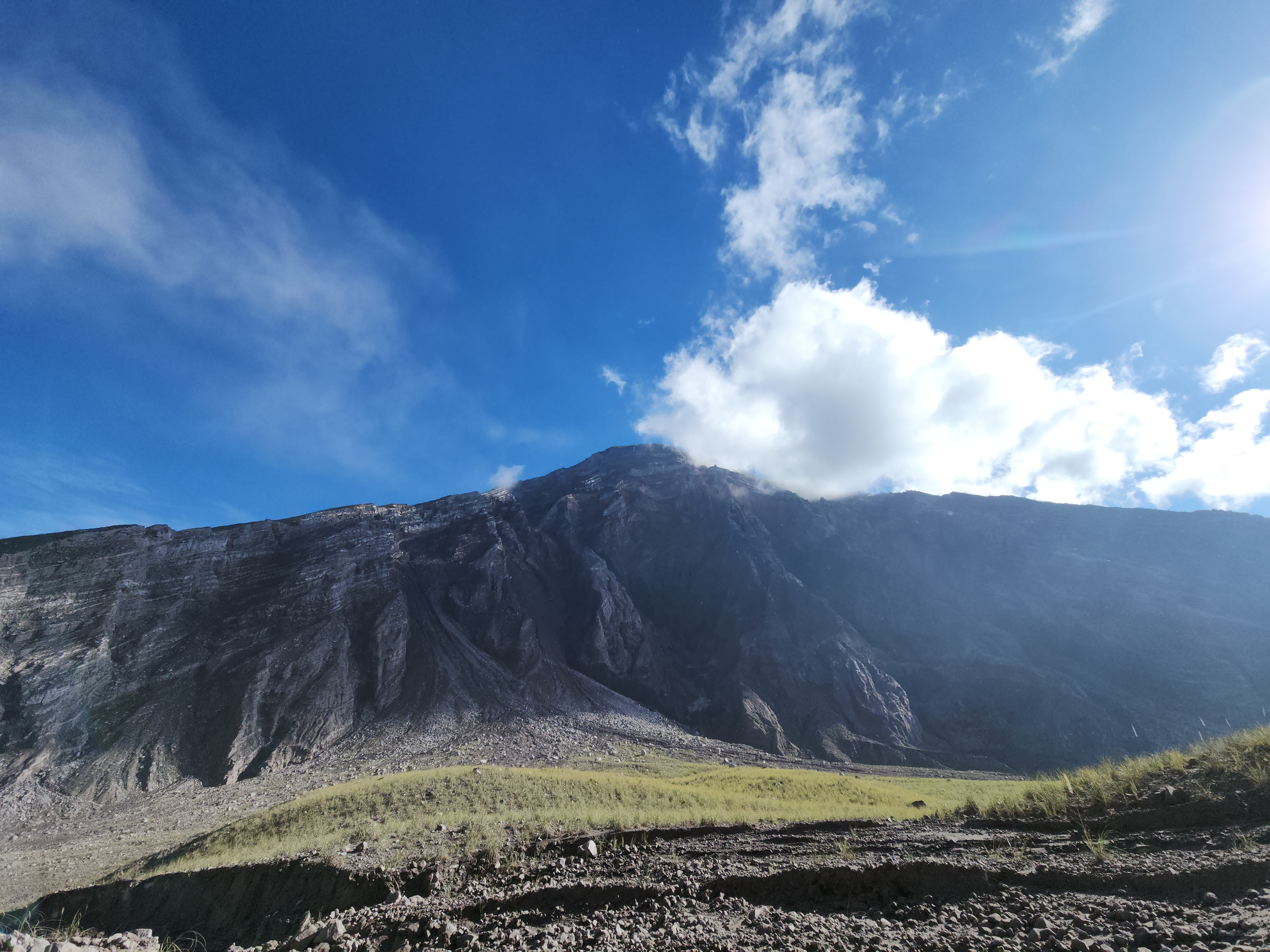
Collapse scar on Santa María created by the eruption

On 24 October, slight earthquakes were perceived. Santa María began discharging steam in the afternoon, before rumbling noises were heard within its vicinity at 17:00. In San Felipe, the sound was described by people as either reminiscent of a waterfall or large boiler. These sounds emanated from the direction of the volcano and persisted for 30 minutes. At about the same period, people in Quezaltenango began to report a dark cloud from the volcano. As the evening progressed, a white sand-like substance began showering and blanketing the area, discoloring the landscape with its whitish color.

At 18:15, ash particles were reported in Finca Helvetia, about 14 km (8.7 mi) west of the volcano. By 20:00, the volcano produced a large eruption column accompanied by lightning flashes. This column took on cauliflower-like shapes. Large lithics began to rain down the volcano's southern flanks at 01:00 of 25 October, signifying that the eruption had entered its Plinian stage. Pea-sized lapilli ash began to fall in Quezaltenango at 03:00. Meanwhile, in Finca Helvetia, pumice measuring 15–25 cm (5.9–9.8 in) and between 0.5–0.75 lb (0.23–0.34 kg) began to rain onto the village at 03:00. The initial fallout was cold before hot pumice was introduced. The material in this fallout later included hot, fist-sized rocks and lava bombs. By 11:00, the eruption had reached its climax. The eruption persisted into the night, though its intensity gradually decreased. The main eruption ended before the morning of 26 October.

Explosions were heard in Costa Rica, some 850 km (530 mi) southeast of the volcano, and also in Oaxaca and Belize. Windows in Cobán rattled and according to residents, detected a sulphurous smell. The captain of the S.S. Newport used her sextant to estimate the height of the eruption column at 27–29 km (17–18 mi). Ash fell onto Motozintla in Mexico, some 104 km (65 mi) northwest, and further into Mexico City. The initial Plinian eruption continued for 18 to 20 hours. Phreatomagmatic and steam eruptions began in the early hours of 26 October. Light steam explosions continued to occur until 1903 while seismic activity was frequent.

The eruption generated a dense-rock equivalent (DRE) volume of 8 km^{3} (1.9 cu mi) of magma; its dacite content measured in DRE was estimated at 5 km^{3} (1.2 cu mi) while tephra volume was estimated at 20 km^{3} (4.8 cu mi). Unlike most large eruptions, Santa María's Plinian column did not collapse, and a caldera did not form despite expelling a large volume of magma. This was probably attributed to the unusually deep location of its magma chamber, which, during the 1902 eruption, was not entirely emptied. The Santiaguito lava dome which formed in 1922 lava composition almost identical to the ones erupted in 1902.

Although there was no caldera, a new, oval-shaped crater formed. In a late November survey, crater had an east-west axis of 1 km (0.62 mi), was 500–600 m (1,600–2,000 ft) at its widest base diameter, and extended to a depth of 200–250 m (660–820 ft). Inside the crater floor were six vents; the largest was circular and 30 m (98 ft) across, and in the center of the crater. The remaining vents were the edge of the crater emitting steam. The second largest of these vents was actively erupting debris some 20 m (66 ft) into the air. A section of Santa María's flank was destroyed, exposing its steep cliffs and revealing layers of lava and ash deposits extending 1,200 m (3,900 ft) high. The scarp, with an estimated angle of 60°, extended almost to the summit of the volcano. At the bottom of the scarp is a 150 m (490 ft) debris cone formed from accumulated debris after they dislodged from the scarp.

== Impact ==
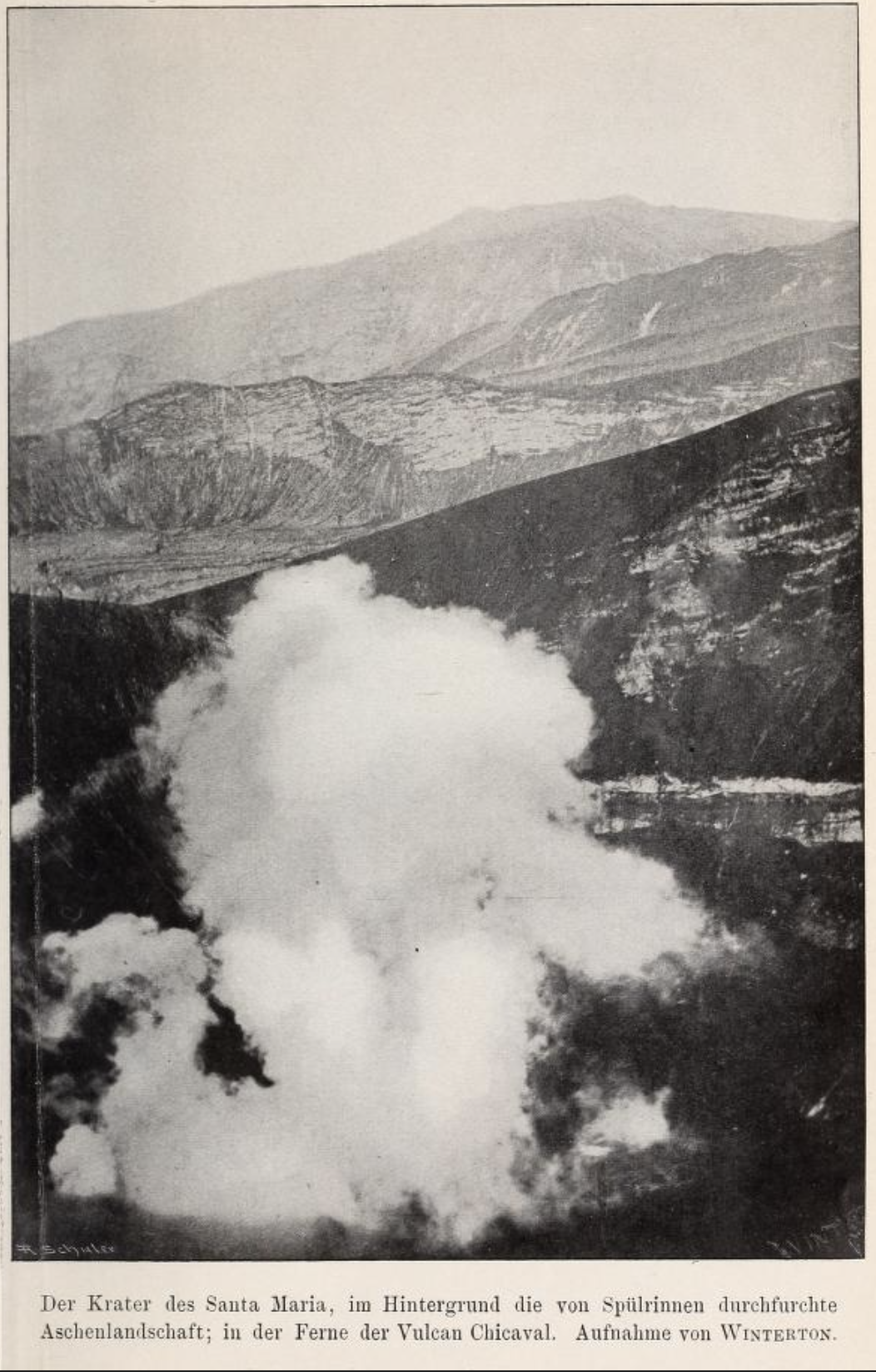
The explosion crater photographed in 1903 with Chicabal in the background

Estimates of the death toll range from 5,000 to 8,700. Those in close proximity to the crater were likely killed while many more were died from roof collapses. Many buildings sustained collapsed roof due to the weight of the accumulating ash. A malaria outbreak also added to the fatalities. In Suiza, a building heavily occupied by those escaping the eruption collapsed from the ashfall, killing 18.

The immediate vicinity of the explosion crater was buried under up to 18 m (59 ft) of ash. All trees and shrubs within a 32 km (20 mi) by 113 km (70 mi) area that stretched halfway towards the Pacific were stripped of its leaves and severely damaged by the rushing volcanic debris. Many trees were entirely uprooted or snapped at their branches; many others were also split by lightning. All vegetation within 5 km (3.1 mi) of the crater was destroyed. Within a month of the eruption, new sprouts emerged from undamaged tree branches. In coffee plants, new branches began growing as previous ones were stripped by the eruption. Portions of the coffee plantations in Xolhuitz, Costa Cuca, Chuva, Progreso and Tumbador were devastated and unrestored. The total losses for coffee was placed at over 300 thousand quintals. In areas where the native vegetation died, the leaves and berries of the Liberian coffee plants were unscathed. Though the Arabian coffee plants withered, their berries were salvaged for low-quality coffee.

According to Gustav Eisen who reported the forest conditions in 1903, the stench of animal corpses rotting beneath volcanic debris was intense. The loss of life among mammals was believed to be enormous, greater than that of avian species. Cattle also died in large numbers; some perished during the eruption or in the subsequent days from consuming ash-contaminated water and grass. Insects were among the fauna that recovered faster; Eisen found butterflies, beetles, mosquitoes and flies in abundance. He also noticed zompopos, leafcutter ants carrying the brown soil towards buried by ash towards the surface. Blackbirds also returned to the area one month after the eruption.

== Aftermath ==
President Manuel Estrada Cabrera attempted to downplay the impact of the eruption. As the eruption occurred just before Fiestas Minervalias, a propaganda fair, commenced, the 26 October issue of Diario de Centro América heavily focused on the fair instead. No issues were published on 27 and 28 October due to the festival, and the first report about the eruption was published on 3 November. There were no official actions in attempting to calculate the number of fatalities and aid only reached the affected departments in December.

While the eruption continued, the regional authorities of Quetzaltenango became responsible for handling the crisis, as attention of the national government was focused on Fiestas Minervalias. In an attempt to suppress the impact of the eruption, citizens were told that the eruption occurred in Mexico. Furthermore, the official government informed Quetzaltenango authorities that no funds were available for recovery, as were absorbed by the response efforts following the April earthquake. Quetzaltenango authorities announced that the West zone agricultural harvest was destroyed, and forecasted a famine due to food shortages. The large cattle deaths also led to a meat shortage. The central government allowed Quetzaltenango authorities to import flour tax free for several months. Water supply and electricity disruptions were also reported; these services were only fully restored several months later. Residents began to clear ash from their roofs to prevent further cave-ins. On 12 November, President Cabrera established the General Supply of Aid for Agriculture to support struggling farmers and the agricultural industry. In late November, Quetzaltenango officials allocated 15,000 pesos for cleaning works another 5,000 to repair its aqueducts.

== See also ==
- List of largest volcanic eruptions
- List of volcanic eruptions by death toll
- List of volcanoes in Guatemala
