= Santa María de Jesús =

- Municipality and town
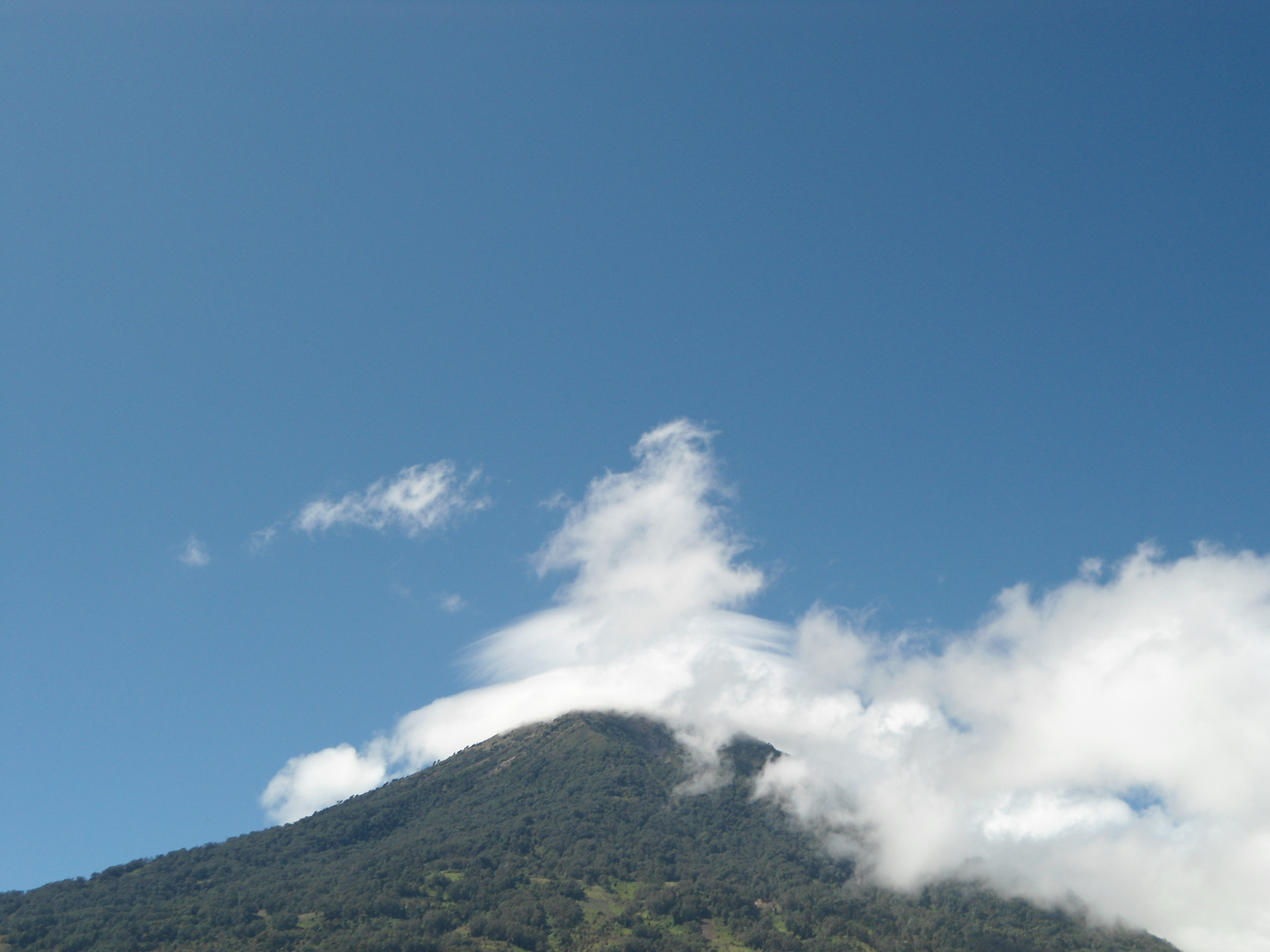
- Volcán de Agua

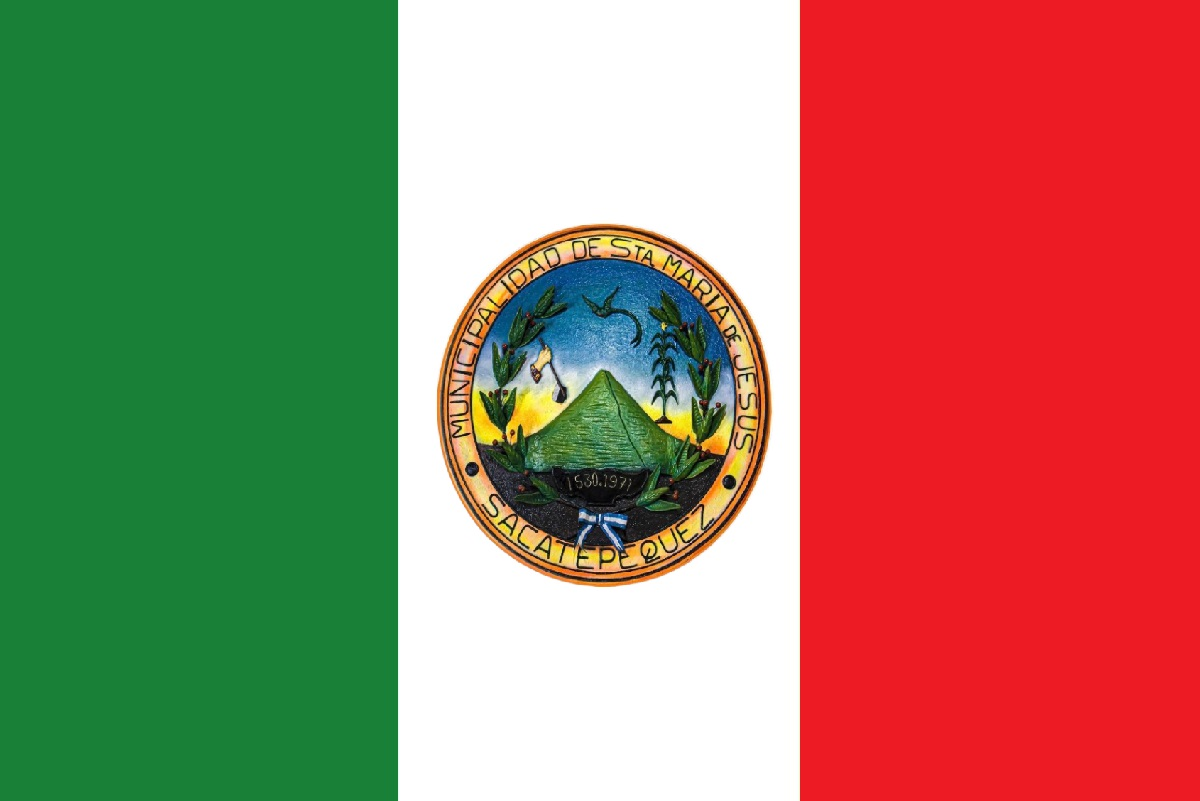
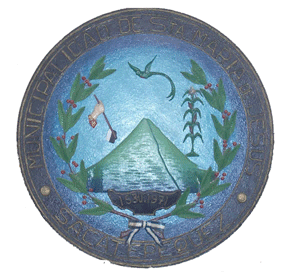
- Flag Seal

- Location within Guatemala
- Coordinates: 14°29′36″N 90°42′34″W
- Country: Guatemala
- Department: Sacatepéquez
- Foundation: 1816

Government
  - Type: Municipality
  - Mayor (2016–2020): Nicolás Cumá Vicente (LIDER)

Area
  - Total: 59.2 km^{2} (22.9 sq mi)
- Elevation: 2,070 m (6,790 ft)

Population (2018 census)
  - Total: 21,938
  - Density: 371/km^{2} (960/sq mi)
- Time zone: UTC-6 (Central America)
- Climate: Cwb

Santa Maria de Jesus (Spanish pronunciation: [ˈsanta maˈɾi.a ðe xeˈsus]) is a town with a population of 21,795 (2018 census), and a municipality in the department of Sacatepéquez about 10 km from the city of Antigua Guatemala. It is located under the slopes of Volcán de Agua. This town has a height of 2,070 meters above sea level. Its central square has a temple built in the seventeenth century with a carved entry arch. Spanish and Kaqchikel are spoken in this town.

== History ==
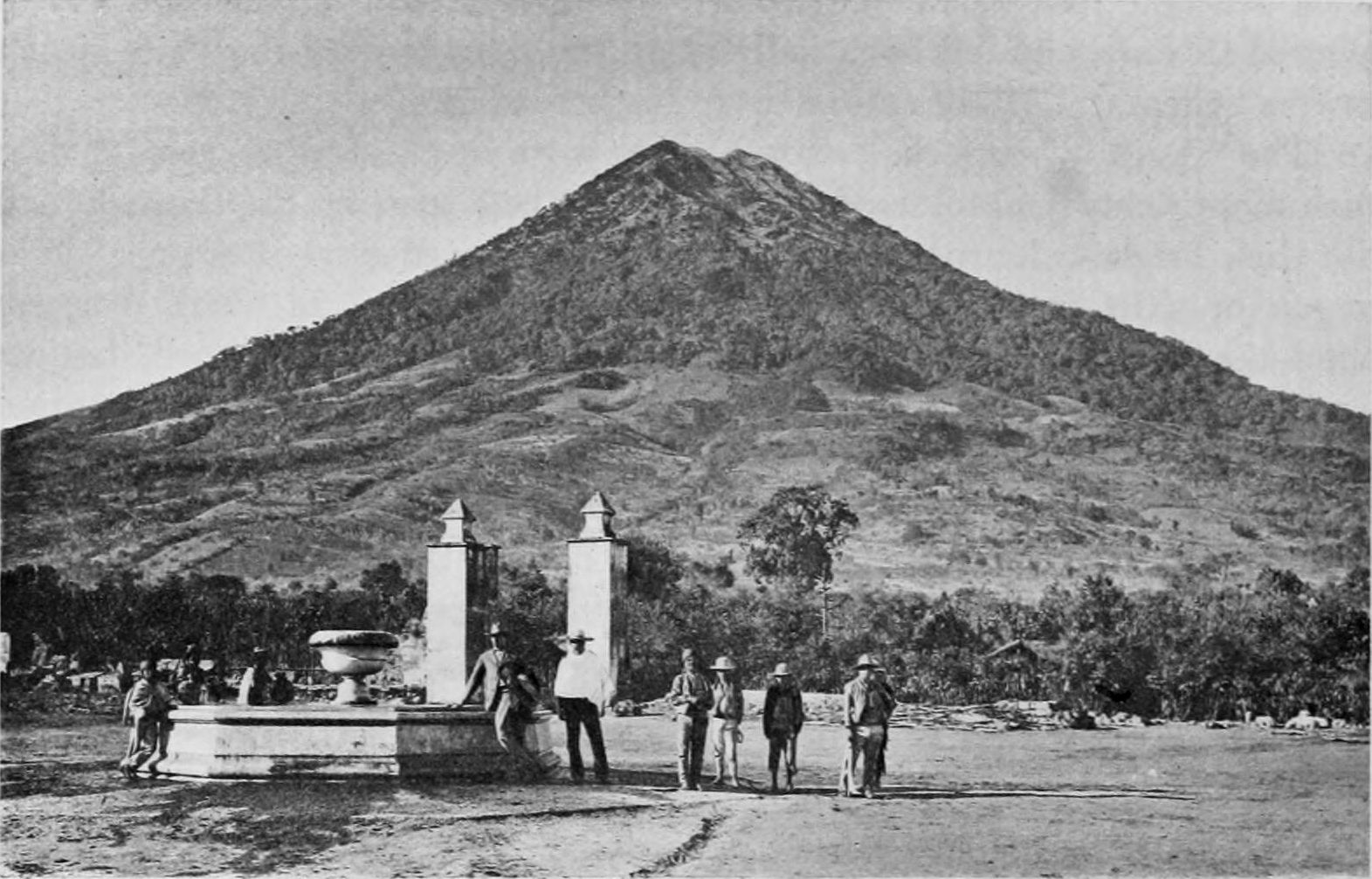
Volcan de Agua as seen from Santa María de Jesús in 1895. Photograph by Alfred Percival Maudslay.

There was no mention of it prior to the sixteenth century. One of the most important activities performed during the Hispanic period in this township was bringing ice gathered from the summit of Volcan de Agua to the city of Santiago. (Note: This tradition disappeared in the early 20th century with the arrival of artificial refrigerators.) The central square has a temple built in the seventeenth century with a carved entry arch.

In January 1881, archeologist Alfred Percival Maudslay arrived to Santa María de Jesús to climb the Agua, which he did on foot from the villa, but unfortunately for him, once he reached the summit he could not take pictures as he had planned because the region was overcast and only the other volcanoes summits were visible. He returned on New Year's Day in 1892 and this time he was able to take the pictures from several places on the volcano. Finally, in 1895, Maudslay went back for a third and last time, this time along with his wife, Anne Cary Maudslay, who wrote her adventure from a Victorian perspective in the book A glimpse at Guatemala. This time the climbing was of approximately 1600 m from Santa María de Jesús, where they had spent the night; they rode on mules from Antigua Guatemala to Santa María de Jesús while the quietness was only broken ever now and then by the bell tolling of nearby villages. Anne Maudslay described her experience as follows: “Passing through a miserably dirty village street, we entered by a pretentious gate into the great bare plaza. A huge ugly church faced us, and to the left stretched the long low cabildo. The other two sides of the plaza were intended to be closed in by high walls, and by the gateway through which we had entered; but these were additions which the Indian mind clearly deemed superfluous, for the gateway was without a gate, half the west wall had fallen down, and the south wall had not been built. Outside this great square the town was almost wholly composed of tratch-roofed native huts”.

Anne Maudslay continues: "The life of the village centered round the fountain which stood in the middle of the plaza. Here party after party of women with babies slung on their backs or astride on their hips, and strings of children running at their heels, came to fill their "tinajas" and carry home the water for the night's consumption". Native women's physical attributes did not impress Maudslay, but their discipline did: "They were sober and could attend to their household duties, whilst the men almost without exception were drunk with chicha".

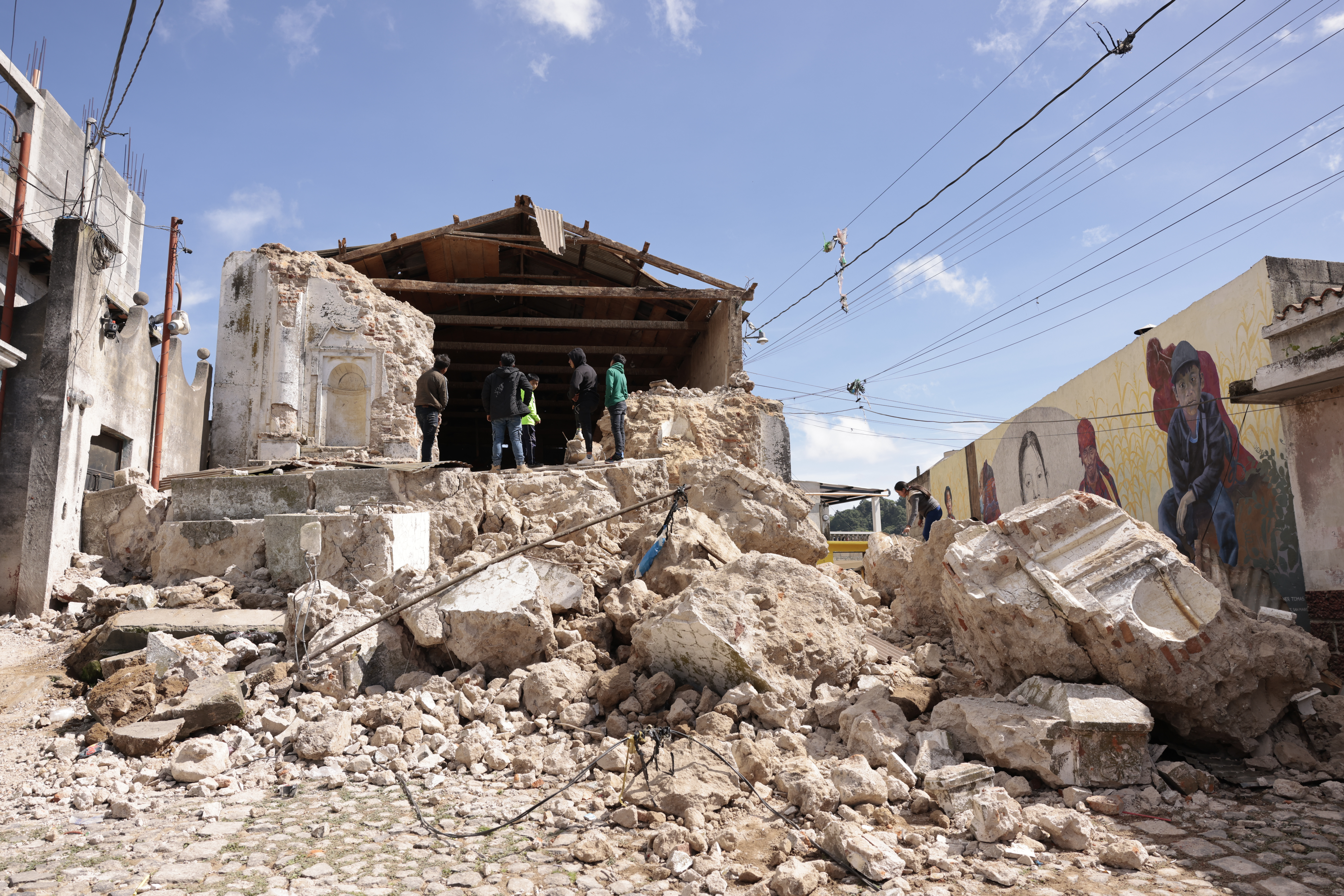
A church collapsed due to the 2025 Guatemala earthquakes in city.

The town was heavily affected in the 2025 Guatemala earthquakes, with 50% of the town's homes thought to have been damaged or destroyed.

== Folklore ==
Among the folk dances presented in this municipality are the dance of "The Deer" and "Micos".

== Notable citizens ==
- María Mercedes Coroy: born and raised in Santa María de Jesús, Coroy plays María in the internationally acclaimed movie Ixcanul Volcano. María is a 17-year-old girl who is forced into a marriage with the foreman of the coffee plantation where her father works.
- María Telón, Mayan actress

== Climate ==
Santa María de Jesús has a subtropical highland climate (Köppen: Cwb).

Climate data for Santa María de Jesús
Month	Jan	Feb	Mar	Apr	May	Jun	Jul	Aug	Sep	Oct	Nov	Dec	Year
Mean daily maximum °C (°F)	20.1 (68.2)	21.1 (70.0)	22.5 (72.5)	23.3 (73.9)	22.3 (72.1)	20.7 (69.3)	20.9 (69.6)	21.4 (70.5)	20.6 (69.1)	20.2 (68.4)	20.1 (68.2)	20.0 (68.0)	21.1 (70.0)
Daily mean °C (°F)	14.5 (58.1)	15.2 (59.4)	16.4 (61.5)	17.5 (63.5)	17.5 (63.5)	16.8 (62.2)	16.7 (62.1)	16.8 (62.2)	16.4 (61.5)	16.0 (60.8)	15.3 (59.5)	14.7 (58.5)	16.2 (61.1)
Mean daily minimum °C (°F)	8.9 (48.0)	9.3 (48.7)	10.3 (50.5)	11.8 (53.2)	12.7 (54.9)	12.9 (55.2)	12.5 (54.5)	12.2 (54.0)	12.3 (54.1)	11.9 (53.4)	10.5 (50.9)	9.5 (49.1)	11.2 (52.2)
Average precipitation mm (inches)	5 (0.2)	6 (0.2)	7 (0.3)	39 (1.5)	141 (5.6)	302 (11.9)	231 (9.1)	201 (7.9)	287 (11.3)	163 (6.4)	34 (1.3)	11 (0.4)	1,427 (56.1)
Source: Climate-Data.org

== See also ==
- List of places in Guatemala

== Notes ==
=== Bibliography ===
- Maudslay, Alfred Percival; Maudslay, Anne Cary (1899). A glimpse at Guatemala, and some notes on the ancient monuments of Central America (PDF). London, UK: John Murray.
