= Tehuantepec Ridge =

Undersea ridge off the coast of Mexico

Coordinates: 12°21′40.8″N 97°46′21.5″W

Approximate surface projection on Pacific Ocean of the Tehuantepec Ridge (orange). To its north-west off the coast of Mexico is the O’Gorman fracture zone. It is subducting under the Middle America Trench. Surface projection on oceans of fracture zones is shown.
Key:
- '"`UNIQ--templatestyles-00000000-QINU`"' Fracture zones
- '"`UNIQ--templatestyles-00000001-QINU`"' Probable extension of Fracture zones
- '"`UNIQ--templatestyles-00000002-QINU`"' Fracture zone of relevance to article
- '"`UNIQ--templatestyles-00000003-QINU`"' Probable extension of fracture zones relevant to article
- '"`UNIQ--templatestyles-00000004-QINU`"' Mid-oceanic ridges
- '"`UNIQ--templatestyles-00000005-QINU`"' Sea
- '"`UNIQ--templatestyles-00000006-QINU`"' Land
- Clicking on the rectangle icon enables full window and mouse-over with text detail.'"`UNIQ--ref-00000007-QINU`"'

The Tehuantepec Ridge (Tehuantepec Fracture Zone, Tehuntepec Ridge) is a linear undersea ridge located off the west coast of Mexico in the Pacific Ocean. It is the remnant of an old fracture zone, and not a tectonic spreading center ridge (see mid-ocean ridge). It extends from the eastern end of the Clipperton fracture zone northeastward toward Mexico into Chiapas and El Chichón until it is subducted into the Middle America Trench. It lies within the tectonic Cocos plate, separating the lower and older seafloor of the Guatemala Basin which lies southeast of the ridge from higher and younger seafloor which lies to its north-west.

Current research indicates that the ridge was formed as a fracture zone and transform fault along the East Pacific Rise. As a result of a change in the motion of the Pacific plate about 13 million years ago, there was also a change in the orientation of the East Pacific Rise, which in turn reoriented the fracture zone, creating the current alignment that is today's Clipperton Fracture Zone. The Tehuantepec Ridge preserves the previous orientation. To its north the O’Gorman Fracture Zone has a similar orientation.

Some researchers have hypothesized that the subducted portion of the Tehuantepec Ridge under Mexico is responsible for the existence of El Chichón volcano as well as the other volcanoes of what is called the Chiapanecan Volcanic Arc. Studies of the 1982 eruption of El Chichón indicated its erupted output was unusual compared to other volcanoes in the Trans-Mexican Volcanic Belt which lies well to the northwest. The anomaly is thought to result from the distinctive composition of the rocks which comprise the Tehuantepec Ridge.
