= Debris cone =

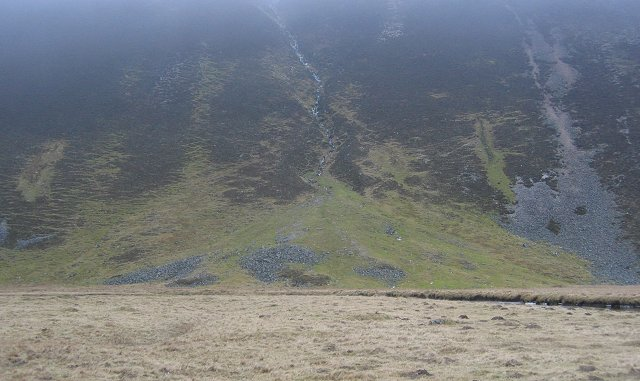
Process-debris is transported by small streams or snow avalanches from valley walls and deposited at the break in valley wall slopes.

A debris cone consists of debris deposited in a conical shape with a surface slope greater than 10 degrees (perpendicular to contours), usually transported by small streams or snow avalanches. A debris cone is also called a dirt cone or cone of detritus.

A debris cone is commonly made when rock from a high-up narrow slit or gorge falls into a flat-floored valley. Here the soil and loose materials are deposited, leaving a mound of conical shape. While an alluvial fan is formed when flowing water rushes rock and soil down a slope, debris cones come from one of several dry processes known as mass wasting. That is gravity pulling loose materials downslope. Such mounds can reach sizes large enough to obstruct river channels. Similar deposits can also be found lying on boulders moved by a landslide, or on a glacier, where a cone-shaped mound of ice or snow may be covered with a veneer of debris thick enough to prevent the underlying ice from melting.

== See also ==
- Colluvium
- Alluvial fan
