= Santa María (volcano) =

Active volcano in Quetzaltenango Department, Guatemala

Santa María, Santiaguito
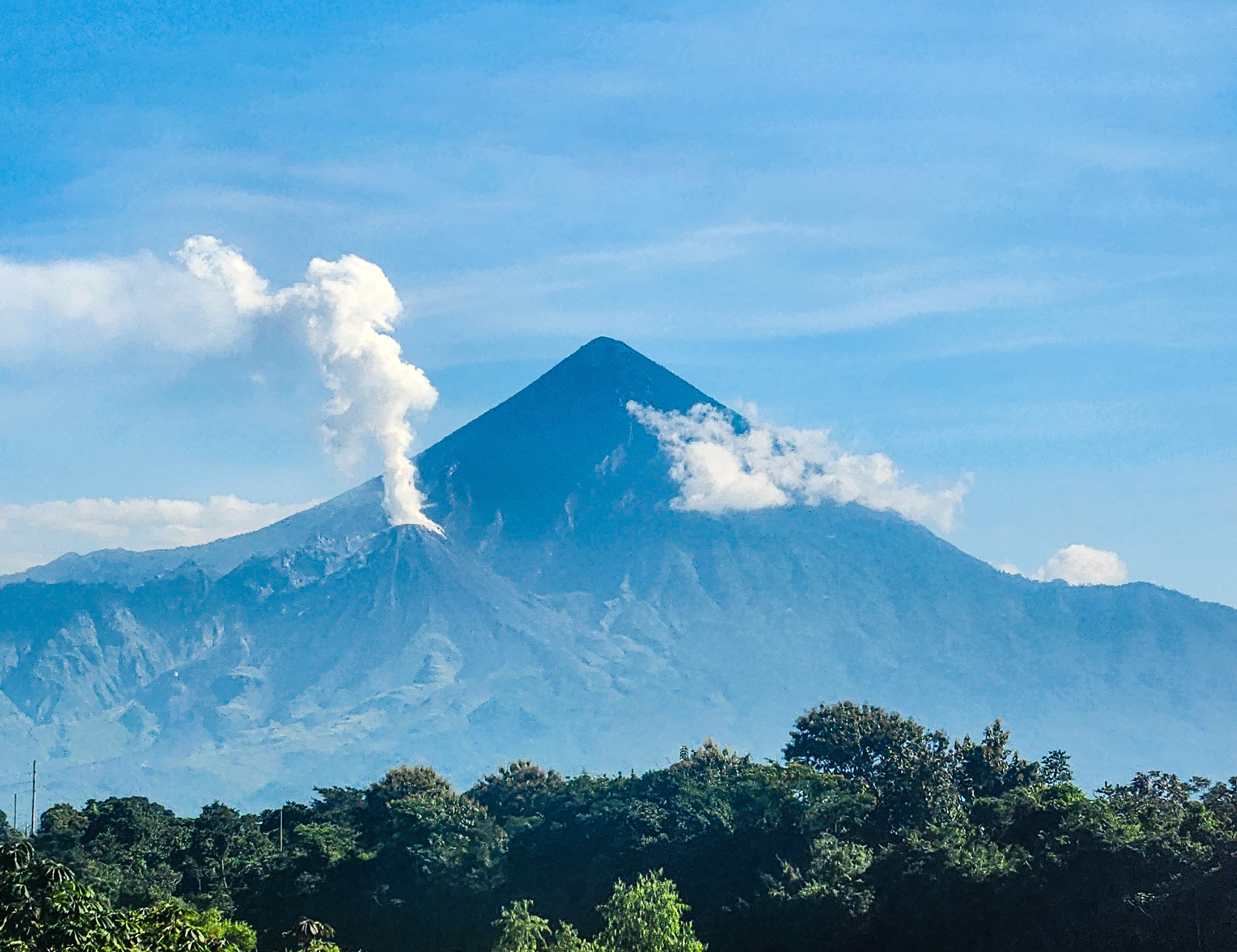
- Santa María and Santiaguito

Highest point
- Elevation: 3,772 m (12,375 ft)
- Coordinates: 14°45′20″N 91°33′06″W

Geography
- Location within Guatemala
- Location: Quetzaltenango Department, Guatemala
- Parent range: Sierra Madre

Geology
- Mountain type: Stratovolcano
- Volcanic arc: Central America Volcanic Arc
- Last eruption: December 11, 2024 (ongoing)

Santa María Volcano is a large active volcano in the western highlands of Guatemala, in the Quetzaltenango Department near the city of Quetzaltenango. It is part of the mountain range of the Sierra Madre.

The volcano was known as Gagxanul in the local Kʼicheʼ language, which means "Naked Volcano or Mountain", before the 16th century Spanish conquest of the region.

The VEI-6 eruption of Santa María Volcano in 1902 was one of the three largest eruptions of the 20th century, after the 1912 Novarupta and 1991 Mount Pinatubo eruptions. It is also one of the five biggest eruptions of the past 200 (and most likely 300) years.

== Geological history ==
Santa María Volcano is part of the Sierra Madre range of volcanoes, which extends along the western edge of Guatemala, separated from the Pacific Ocean by a broad plain. The volcanoes are formed by the subduction of the Cocos Plate under the Caribbean Plate, which led to the formation of the Central America Volcanic Arc.

Eruptions at Santa María are estimated to have begun about 103 ka. Construction of the volcanic edifice occurred in four phases, from 103–72, 72, 60–46, and 35–25 ka, building up the large cone that reaches about 1,400 metres (4,600 ft) above the plain on which the nearby city of Quetzaltenango sits. Following the cone-building eruptions, activity seems to have changed to a pattern of long periods of repose followed by the emission of small lava flows from vents on the mountain.

== 1902 eruption ==
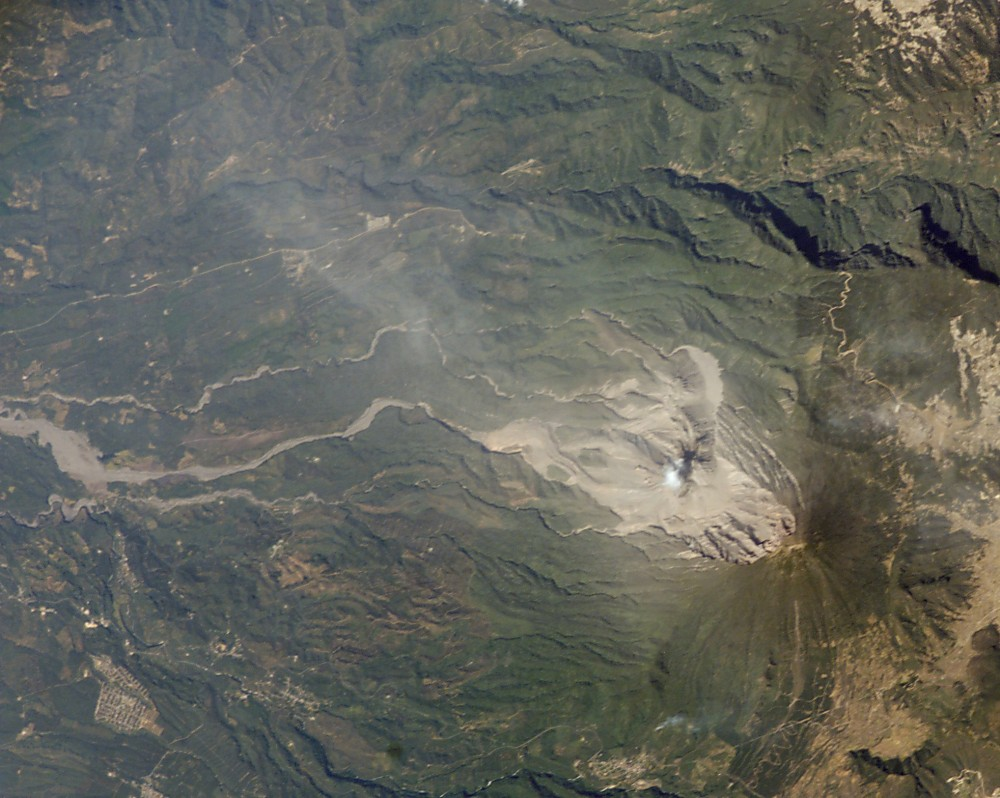
Steam rises from Santiaguito. The area of the flank destroyed by the 1902 eruption can be clearly seen. Lahar deposits snake down river valleys to the left of the image

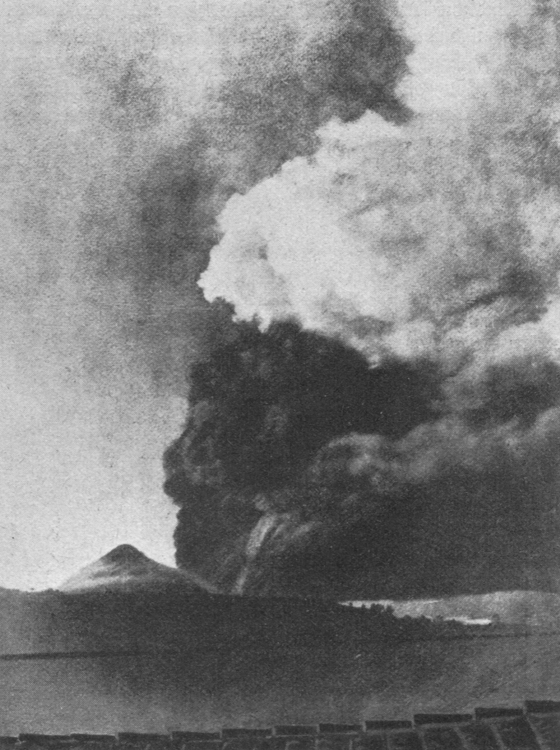
Santa María, 1902 eruption

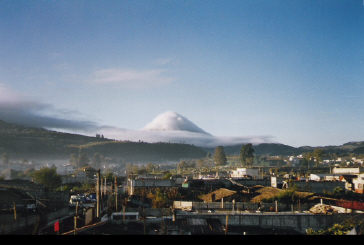
The volcano as seen from the nearby city of Quetzaltenango

The first eruption of Santa María in recorded history occurred in October 1902. Before 1902 the volcano had been dormant for at least 500 years and possibly several thousand years, but its awakening was clearly indicated by a seismic swarm in the region starting in January 1902, which included a major earthquake in April 1902. The eruption began on 24 October, and the largest explosions occurred over the following two days, ejecting an estimated 8 cubic kilometres (1.9 cu mi) of magma. The eruption was one of the largest of the 20th century, only slightly less in magnitude to that of Mount Pinatubo in 1991. The eruption had a Volcanic Explosivity Index (VEI) of 6, thus being 'Colossal'.

The pumice formed in the climactic eruption fell over an area of about 273,000 square kilometres (105,000 sq mi), and volcanic ash as far away as San Francisco, California, 4,000 kilometres (2,500 mi) away. The eruption occurred out of a vent on the southwest side of the volcano, leaving a crater about 1 kilometre (0.6 mi) in diameter and about 300 metres (980 ft) deep, stretching from just below the summit to an elevation of about 2,300 metres (7,500 ft). The first evidence of the eruption was a sprinkling of sand on Quezaltenango. The wind then changed from the south to the east and ashes began to fall at Helvetia, a coffee plantation 10 kilometres (6 mi) southwest. Many coffee plantations were destroyed.

Because of the lack of recorded eruptive activity at Santa María, local people did not recognise the preceding seismicity as warning signs of an eruption. Estimates are that 6,000 people died as a result of the eruption. They were burned or suffocated.

Due to the eruption, in an area for up to 160km from the volcano, there was total darkness for 53 hours. After the eruption, the area was also affected by gangs who went to the affected areas to steal from people, murder and plunder plantations.

For the native people the eruption consequences were catastrophic: they not only lost relatives, friends, homes and harvest, but they were also enslaved in the recovery while "criollo" landlords were compensated for the loss with lands that were confiscated from native communities in San Miguel Uspantán Quiché Department, Panam in Suchitepéquez Department and in Sololá Department.

=== 1902 eruption sequence of events ===
- 24 October: 5:00 pm: At San Felipe a sound was heard, similar to the roar of a waterfall, for five minutes, coming from the volcano; but the mist surrounding the volcano did not allow any direct observation of what was happening.
- 24 October: 6:00 pm: Cinders and ashes started falling over Quetzaltenango
- 24 October: 7:00 pm: Witnesses recall seeing lightning and a strong fiery red light coming from the volcano, and noise similar of that of an industrial furnace.
- 24 October: 8:00 pm: From San Felipe one could see a giant plume of black ash with numerous whirlwinds crossed by thousands of lightning bolts and curved lines of red light. All the area surrounding the volcano kept shaking and large explosions could be heard as far as 160 km (99 mi) away; strong winds carried ash and debris as far as 800 km (500 mi) away, or even more; a part of the cloud hovered on the north side of the cone for days, and a pitch black darkness ensued.
- 25 October: 1:00 am: The eruption became more violent and large rocks from the volcano started falling as far as 14 km (8.7 mi) away, destroying towns and farm houses.
- 26 October: 12:00 am: The volcano calmed down.
- 26 October: 3:00 pm: Another eruption, but this time it was a white plume that came out, which was likely composed of water vapor.

=== Image gallery ===
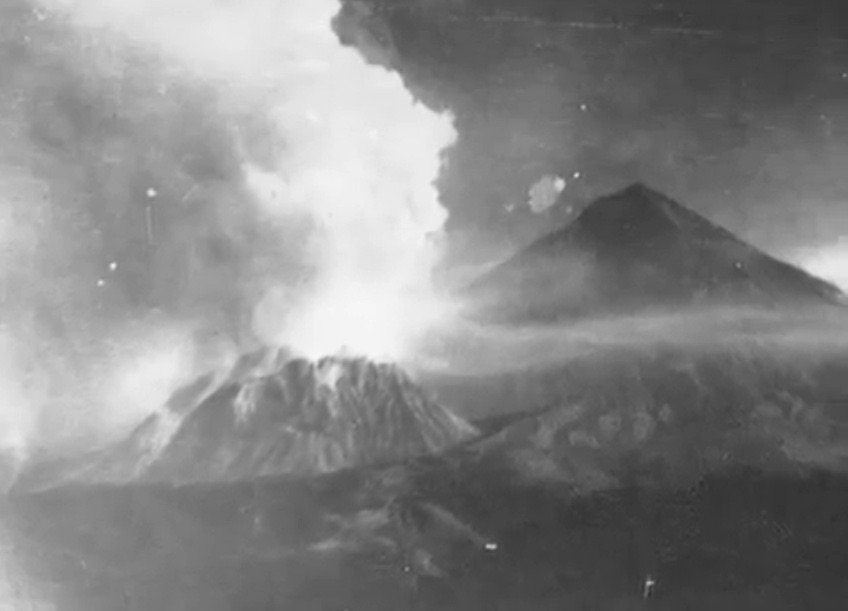

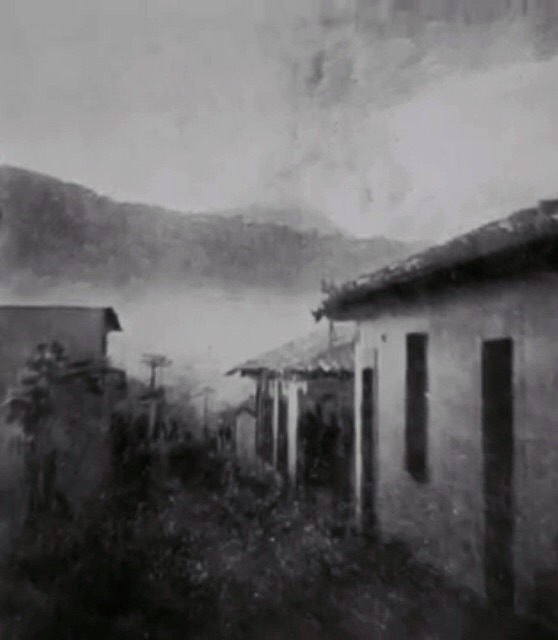

== Santiaguito ==
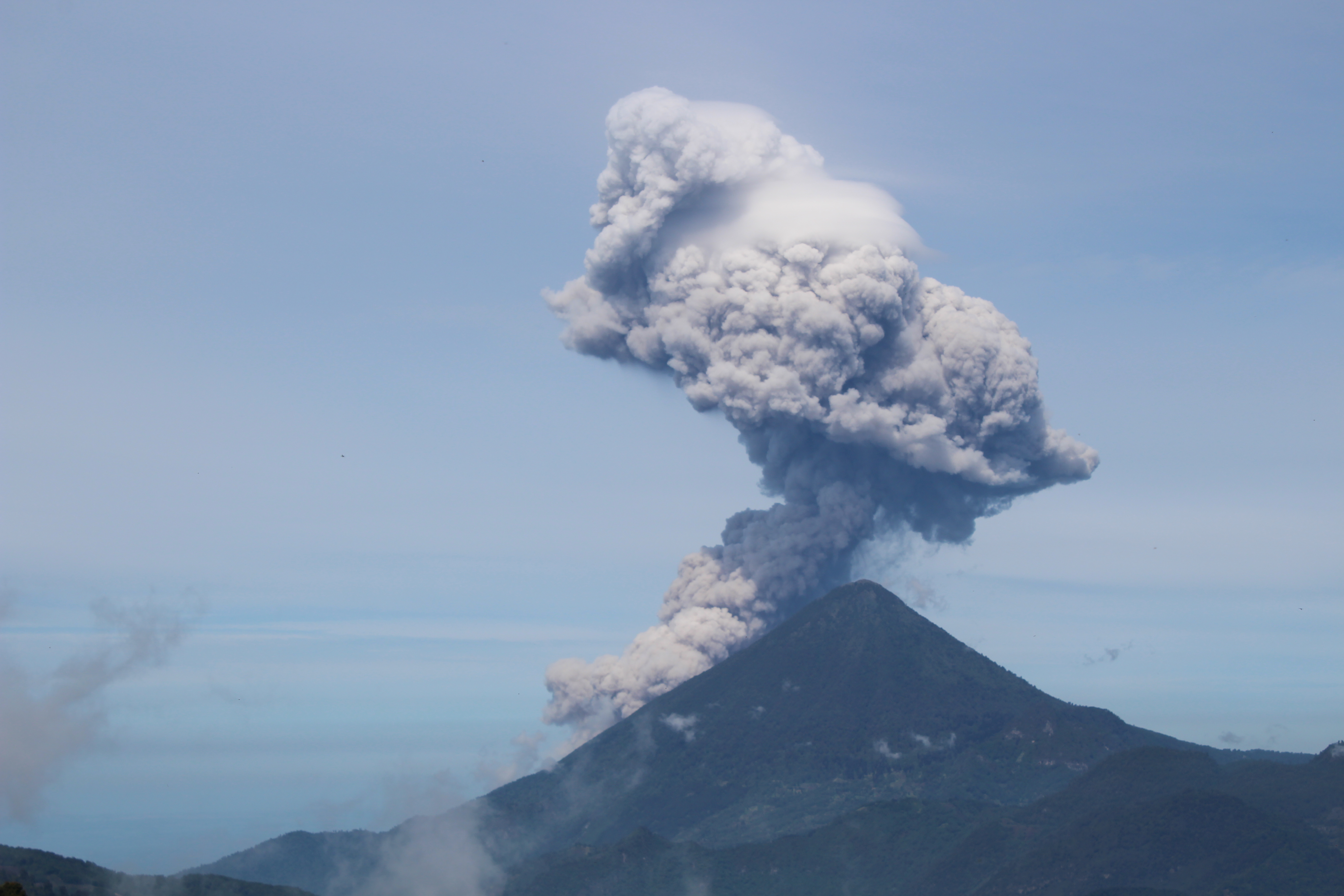
Santiaguito, 2016 eruption

The 1902 eruption was followed by 20 years of dormancy. New eruptions began in 1922, with the extrusion of a lava dome complex in the crater left by the 1902 eruption. The lava dome complex, named Santiaguito, is still active today with over 1 km^{3} of lava erupted so far. The lava dome complex has four main domes: El Caliente, La Mitad, El Monje and El Brujo. The currently active vent is El Caliente.

The dome growth has been both endogenous and exogenous. The former implies dome interior expansion to accommodate new lava and the latter refers to superficial piling up of lava. Activity has been concentrated at several different vents, and Santiaguito now has the appearance of several overlapping domes. At the beginning of dome growth the composition was dacite, identical to the composition of the Santa Maria eruption. By 1990 the composition had shifted to a less evolved andesite. It has been proposed that this is due to a stratified magma chamber beneath the volcano.

The early (pre-1990) exogenous volcanism has consisted of lava spines and lava flows. Nowadays, only lava flows are erupted. All the volcanic activity is cyclic with 10+ year cyclic timescales between periods of high volcanism with high extrusion rates and low volcanism with low extrusion rates. The latest with high extrusion rate was in 2011–2015 with the emplacement of more than four new lava flows. Frequent small eruptions and pyroclastic flows have been ongoing throughout dome growth.

Although most of Santiaguito's eruptive activity has been relatively gentle, occasional larger explosions have occurred. In 1929 part of the dome collapsed, generating pyroclastic flows which killed anywhere from several hundred up to 5,000 people. Occasional rockfalls have generated smaller pyroclastic flows, and vertical eruptions of ash to heights of a few kilometres above the dome are common. Santiaguito is now a tourist attraction, as minor eruptions occur with regularity and can be observed by visitors from the summit of Santa Maria.

== Volcanic hazards at Santa María ==
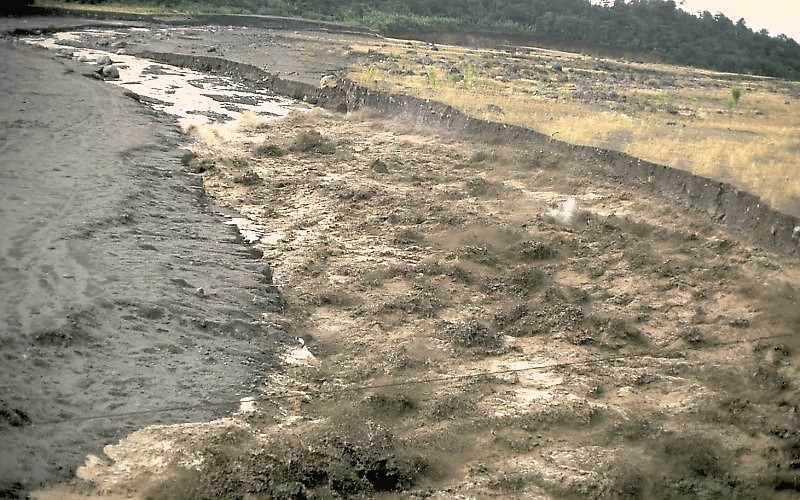
A hot lahar rushes down a river valley near El Palmar in 1989

The areas to the south of Santa María are considerably affected by volcanic activity at Santiaguito. Currently, the most common volcanic hazards at Santa María are lahars, which frequently occur in the rainy season due to heavy rainfall on loose volcanic deposits. Lahars are particularly large and frequent during periods of high volcanism at Santiaguito. The town of El Palmar, 10 kilometres (6 mi) from Santiaguito, has been destroyed twice by lahars from Santiaguito forcing the town to be moved to the present Nuevo El Palmar, and infrastructure such as roads and bridges have been repeatedly damaged. Lahar deposits from Santiaguito have affected rivers all the way downstream to the Pacific Ocean.

Near constant lava flows occur from Santiaguito, and can reach up to 4 km from the vent. Lava flow activity occurs in cycles, with the longest lava flows occurring during times of high volcanic activity. Much shorter lava flows occur during the longer periods of low volcanic activity. These lava flows flow only a short distance from the vent before collapsing. The magma at Santiaguito is rich in silica and is thus highly viscous. The lava flows are slow moving and mostly cause property damage, although in the past catastrophic pyroclastic flows have been triggered from lava flows, which have extended several kilometers towards the west.

One hazard which could be devastating is the collapse of Santa María itself. The 1902 crater has left the southern flank of the mountain above Santiaguito highly over-steepened, and a large earthquake or eruption from Santiaguito could trigger a huge landslide, which might cover up to 100 square kilometres (39 sq mi). However, this is thought to be unlikely in the short term.

In light of the threat it poses to nearby populations, Santa María has been designated a Decade Volcano, identifying it as a target for particular study by volcanologists to mitigate any future natural disasters at the volcano.

== See also ==
- List of volcanic eruptions by death toll
- List of volcanoes in Guatemala
- Timeline of volcanism on Earth
