= 1902 Guatemala earthquake =

Severe earthquake in western Guatemala

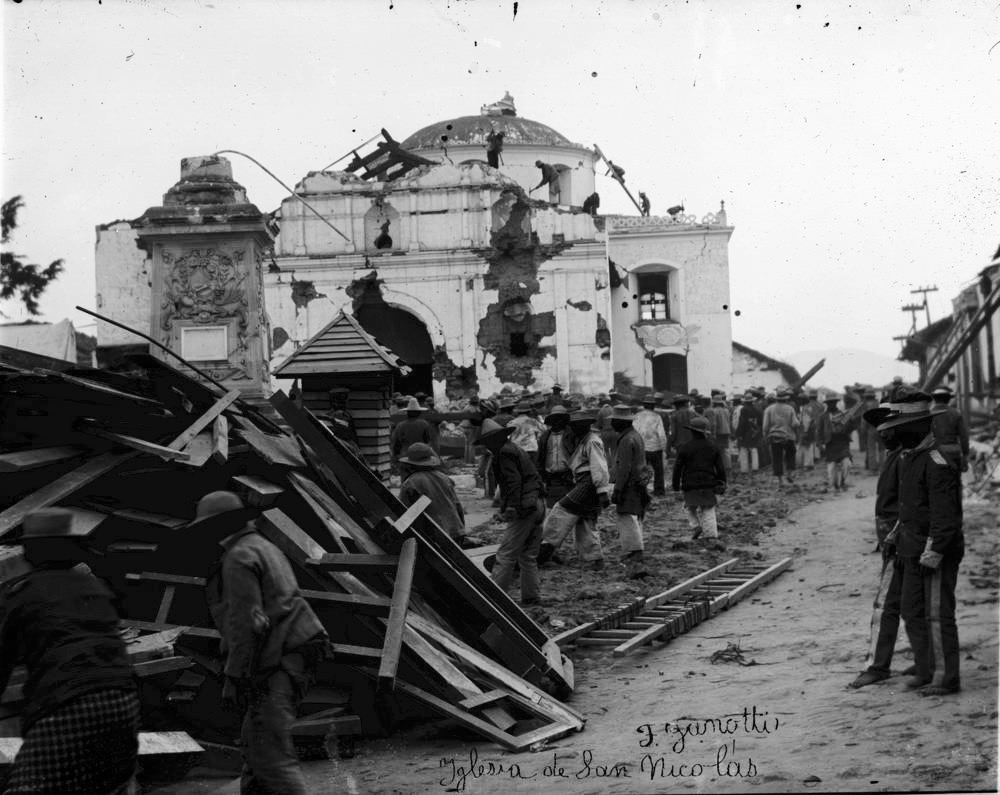
- Quetzaltenango after the earthquake

- Location within Central America
- UTC time: 1902-04-19 02:23:00
- ISC event: 16957763
- USGS-ANSS: ComCat
- Local date: April 18, 1902
- Local time: 8:23 p.m.
- Duration: 1–2 min
- Magnitude: 7.5 M_{w}
- Depth: 25 km (16 mi)
- Epicenter: 14°N 91°W
- Areas affected: Guatemala
- Max. intensity: MMI VIII (Severe)
- Casualties: 800–2,000

The 1902 Guatemala earthquake occurred on April 18 at 8:23 pm with a moment magnitude of 7.5 and a maximum Mercalli intensity of VIII (Severe). The rupture was initiated at a depth of 25 km (16 mi) and the duration was 1 to 2 minutes.

The foreshock and aftershock sequence of this incident were major. Before the main shock, there was an earthquake swarm which persisted for three months, and the tremors afterward lasted for more than two weeks. With hindsight, it is clear that this swarm and the mainshock were clear indicators of the awakening of the long-dormant Volcán Santa María, located 97 km (60 mi) to the northwest, which led to the historic explosive eruption of 1902 which occurred 6 months later in October.

A majority of churches in western Guatemala and eastern Chiapas were either severely devastated or abolished. The number of people killed was between 800 and 2,000.

A strange occurrence of heavy rains, lightning, and thunder took place shortly before the earthquake. A few weeks before the earthquake, there was rain every afternoon for several days straight. Guatemala City was instantly flooded when massive gaps opened in the streets, water pipes ruptured, and huts along with cathedrals disintegrated and collapsed, burying hundreds. In just one hour, approximately 80,000 people were rendered homeless.

As soon as the earthquake struck, the sky cleared up and there was no rain for approximately three weeks. It has been said that the earthquake had something to do with an atmospheric disturbance connected with an electrical nature. The reason for this is that the early storms were electrical storms.

== See also ==
- List of earthquakes in Guatemala
