= 2012 Guatemala earthquake =

7.4 Mw earthquake off the Pacific coast of Guatemala

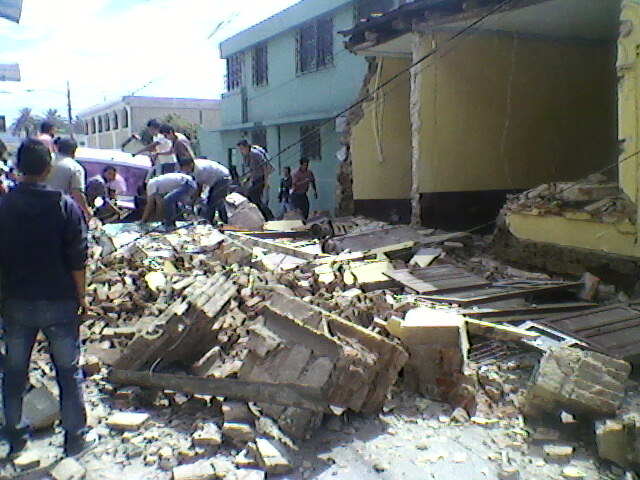
- Damage in San Marcos

- Location within Guatemala
- UTC time: 2012-11-07 16:35:45
- ISC event: 601879562
- USGS-ANSS: ComCat
- Local date: November 7, 2012
- Local time: 10:35:45
- Magnitude: 7.4 M_{w}
- Depth: 24.1 km (15.0 mi)
- Epicenter: 13.987°N 91.965°W
- Areas affected: Guatemala
- Max. intensity: MMI VII (Very strong)
- Casualties: 139 dead, 155 injured

The 2012 Guatemala earthquake occurred on November 7 at 10:35:45 local time. The shock had a moment magnitude of 7.4 and a maximum Mercalli Intensity of VII (Very strong). The epicenter was located in the Pacific Ocean, 35 kilometres (22 mi) south of Champerico in the department of Retalhuleu. The affected region is earthquake-prone, where the Cocos plate is being subducted along the Middle America Trench beneath the North American and the Caribbean plates, near their triple junction.

The quake was reportedly felt in Guatemala and in parts of Mexico, El Salvador, Belize, Honduras, Nicaragua and Costa Rica. Damage to buildings was reported in several cities in Guatemala, including San Marcos, Quetzaltenango and the capital Guatemala City. The Pacific Tsunami Warning Center issued a warning about the possibility of a local tsunami within 160 to 320 km (100 to 200 mi) of the epicenter.

With 139 deaths, this is the most intense and deadliest earthquake that has hit Guatemala since the earthquake of 1976.

== Damage and casualties by country ==
=== Guatemala ===
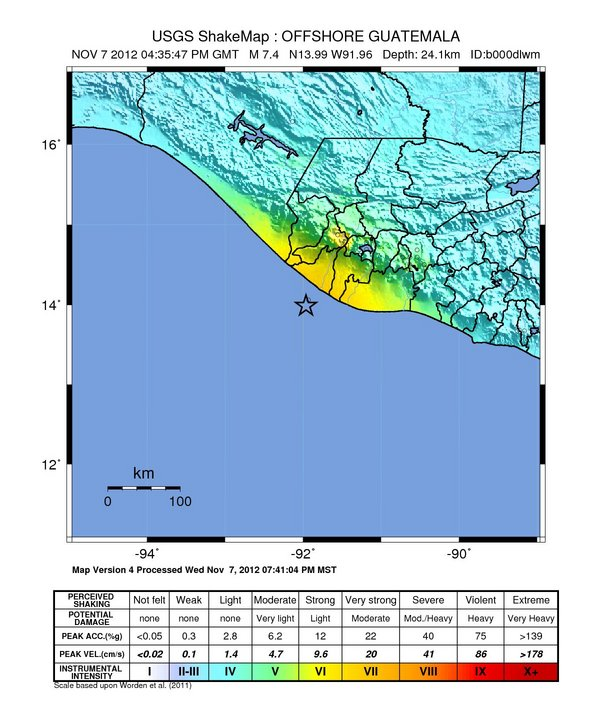
USGS Shakemap.

San Marcos, Quetzaltenango, Sololá, Totonicapán, Quiché and Huehuetenango were the hardest hit departments. Preliminary reports mention a death toll of at least 139 in Guatemala, of which at least 29 were in San Marcos, 11 in Quetzaltenango, and 2 in Sololá. According to the minister of energy of Guatemala, the earthquake left 73,000 households without power. The Guatemalan president initially declared a 30-day "state of calamity" in the departments of Retalhuleu, Sololá, Totonicapán, San Marcos, Quetzaltenango, Quiché and Huehuetenango. The "state of calamity" was subsequently prolonged until being revoked on July 25, 2013. In Guatemala, as of November 11, 9,414 houses were found damaged, and 18,755 people were evacuated, 7,218 of which stayed in 61 refuges. The Pan-American Highway in Guatemala (CA-1) was damaged.

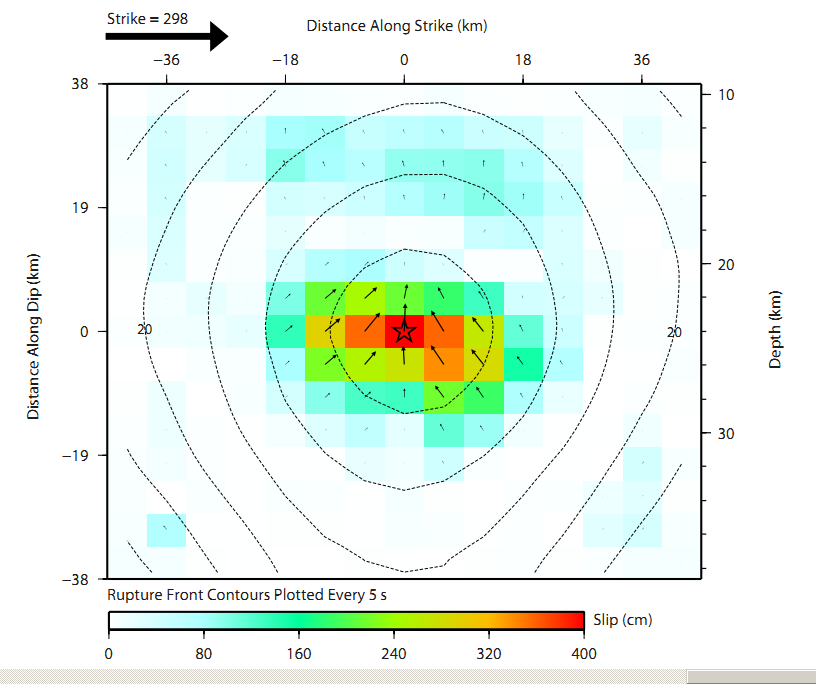
Finite fault model of the earthquake

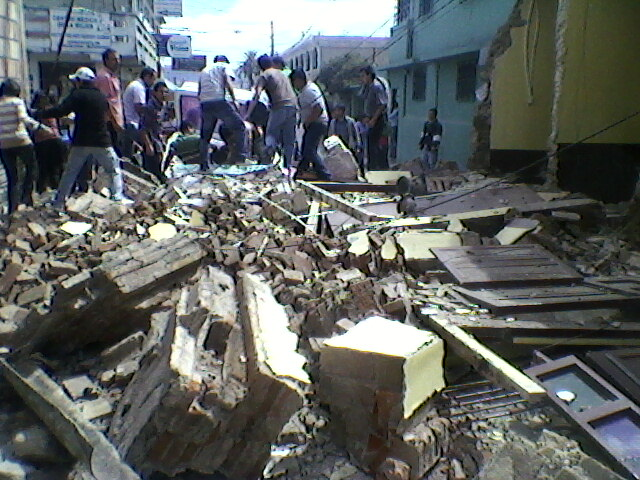
Heavy damage to buildings in San Marcos, Guatemala

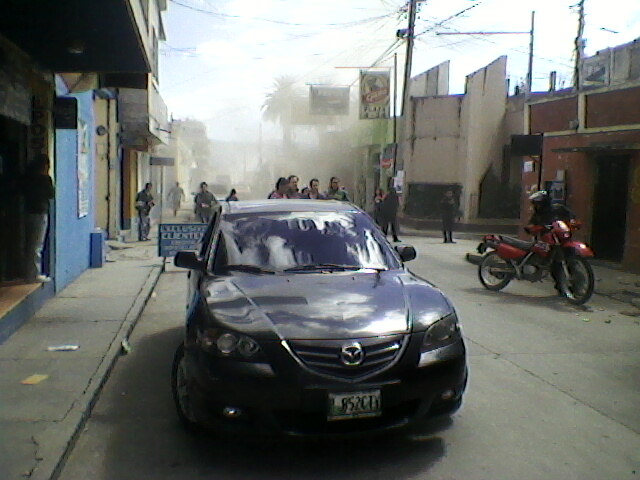
Damaged buildings in the city of San Marcos, a few seconds after the earthquake

There were collapsed buildings and reported deaths and injuries in San Marcos. Accounts of deaths and injuries in San Marcos were initially difficult to confirm due to communication interruption and roads blocked by landslides. Many people in San Marcos, fearing possible aftershocks, gathered on the cold and dark streets. At least 50 houses were damaged in El Quetzal, 9 of which no longer inhabitable, and the dwellers had to take refuge in the community public school. More than 300 people stayed in 10 refuges in the department. Lack of water in the refuges in San Pedro Sacatepéquez and San Marcos due to the collapse of piping caused preoccupations about the sanitary conditions.

Eight people were buried in a landslide in Concepción Chiquirichapa. 156 houses were damaged in Quetzaltenango Department, and government buildings in Quetzaltenango City (Xela) were slightly damaged.

Retalhuleu, situated in the south, is close to the epicenter. The Departmental Palace of Retalhuleu, a historical building, was damaged, which caused the government offices therein to be relocated.

Sololá reported the most damaged houses with number of 4,756, followed by 3,870 in San Marcos.

Cracks were reported in Palacio Nacional de la Cultura in Guatemala City, a former government seat built between 1939 and 1943.

Some houses of the coffee growers were damaged. No major damage was reported for agricultural products such as coffee, vegetables and potatoes.

=== Mexico ===
Minor damage was reported in the state of Chiapas, where public buildings were evacuated, and telephone and internet services were interrupted. Over a dozen buildings in Chiapas had cracked; the city hall of Tapachula, the installations of the Desarrollo Integral de la Familia, along with a school in Ciudad Hidalgo, were among the structures affected.

In Oaxaca, several aftershocks of the earthquake were felt throughout various communities. The quake was also felt in the states of Campeche, Guerrero, Michoacán, Morelos, Puebla and Tabasco.

In Mexico City, workers rushed to the streets from the office buildings, and no major damage was reported.

=== El Salvador ===
In El Salvador, many urban dwellers evacuated their homes in the capital city, but there were no reports of any damage.

=== Nicaragua ===
Nicaragua emitted a tsunami alert after the quake and alerted several communities along the coastlines to mobilize to higher altitudes.

== Relief and reconstruction ==
The minister of finance of Guatemala expressed that 800 million quetzales were ready for covering emergent needs due to the earthquake. The Ministry of Health of Guatemala assigned 1 million quetzales to the hospital of San Marcos and dispatched two trucks with medicines. In Guatemala City, various organizations collected donated provisions for people affected by the earthquake. The minister of interior announced a fund of 25 million quetzales for the reconstruction of damaged police stations, prisons, and government buildings.

The United States Ambassador to Guatemala announced to offer US$50,000 to Coordinadora Nacional para la Reducción de Desastres (CONRED) for immediate humanitarian help. The United States and Taiwan would offer US$110,000 in total as economical support. The Inter-American Development Bank would offer US$200,000. Various countries offered to provide help in personnel or matter, including Venezuela and Chile. World Food Programme offered 72 tonnes of emergency food aid.

On November 9, the authorities started the evaluation of the damaged houses in San Marcos and San Pedro Sacatepéquez to decide which to be repaired and which to be demolished and rebuilt. The reconstruction in San Marcos had started on November 27. It was estimated that the reconstruction of the houses could need at least a year.

== See also ==
- List of earthquakes in 2012
- List of earthquakes in Guatemala
