= 2014 Mexico–Guatemala earthquake =

6.9 Mw earthquake in Mexico and Guatemala

- Location within Mexico
- UTC time: 2014-07-07 11:23:54
- ISC event: 610571023
- USGS-ANSS: ComCat
- Local date: July 7, 2014
- Local time: 05:23:54
- Magnitude: 6.9 M_{w}
- Depth: 53 km (33 mi)
- Epicenter: 14.72°N 92.46°W
- Type: Dip-slip
- Areas affected: Mexico; Guatemala
- Max. intensity: MMI VII (Very strong)
- Landslides: Yes
- Casualties: 5 dead, 12 injured

The 2014 Mexico–Guatemala earthquake struck 4 km (2.5 mi) west of Puerto Madero, on July 7 at 05:23:54, at a depth of 53 km (33 mi). The shock had a moment magnitude of 6.9 and a maximum Mercalli intensity of VII (Very Strong). Collapsed buildings and a heart attack resulted in the deaths of five people and another 12 were injured.

== See also ==
- List of earthquakes in 2014
- List of earthquakes in Guatemala
- List of earthquakes in Mexico
