= Motagua Fault =

Geological fault in Guatemala and Mexico

Coordinates: 15°08′N 89°22′W

- Motagua Fault Zone
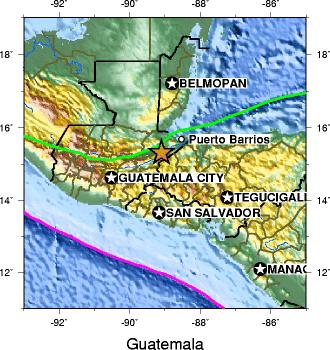
- Location: Guatemala, Mexico, Belize, (Note: Situated on southeastern edge of Motagua fault) Honduras (Note: Situated on northwestern edge of Motagua fault)

Tectonics
- Plate: North American plate, Caribbean plate
- Status: Active
- Earthquakes: 1717, 1773, 1902, 1976, 1980, 2009
- Type: transform fault

The Motagua Fault (also, Motagua Fault Zone) is a major, active left lateral-moving transform fault which cuts across Guatemala. It forms part of the tectonic boundary between the North American plate and the Caribbean plate. It is considered the onshore continuation of the Swan Islands Transform Fault and Cayman trench, which run under the Caribbean Sea. Its western end appears not to continue further than its surface trace, where it is covered by Cenozoic volcanics.

The measured length of the fault is approximately 350 km and is the longest fault in Guatemala. Motion of the fault and others in the plate boundary have formed north–south trending grabens across the region that show evidence of counter-clockwise rotation over time. Guatemala City lies in one of these grabens, which may contribute to the seismic hazard posed to the city's inhabitants.

The Motagua Fault is regarded by some geologists as part of a system of faults designated the "Motagua-Polochic system" rather than as a discrete single boundary. The Polochic fault (also referred to as the Chixoy-Polochic Fault) lies north and parallel to the Motagua Fault and shares some of the motion between the North American and Caribbean plates. Studies of GPS displacement of the zone reveal that the motion of the North American / Caribbean plate Boundary is, for the most part, accommodated by the Motagua Fault.

== Earthquakes ==
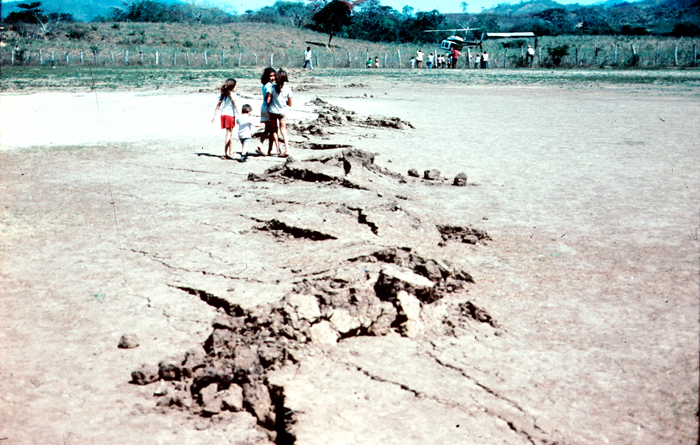
Along the Motagua Fault trace (1976 Guatemala earthquake) where it crosses the Gualán soccer field. This zigzag type of fault trace is known as "mole track", which is best developed in hard-packed, brittle surface materials.

The Motagua Fault has been responsible for several major earthquakes in Guatemala's history, including the 7.5 M_{w} Guatemala 1976 earthquake, and is also notable for its significant visible fault trace. The event caused 2 meters of vertical displacement and ruptured 230 km of the fault's length. The quake damaged a large amount of the country's infrastructure and resulted in the deaths of 23,000 people.

Information about historical earthquakes is determined by digging trenches along the fault zone and consulting historical records and documents.
