= Middle America Trench =

Subduction zone in the eastern Pacific off the southwestern coast of Middle America

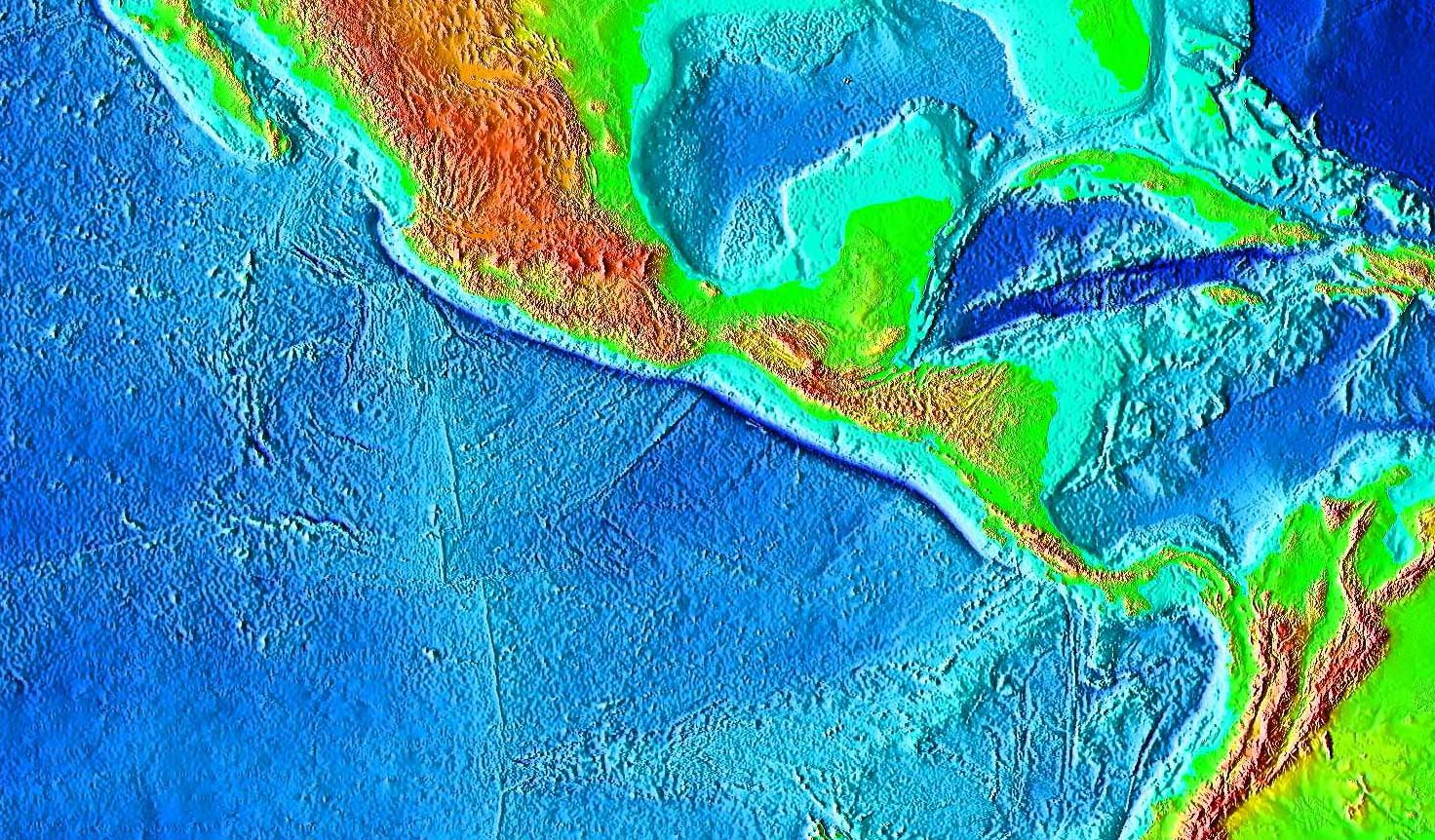
The trench is colored in dark blue, extending from central Mexico to Costa Rica in the Pacific Ocean

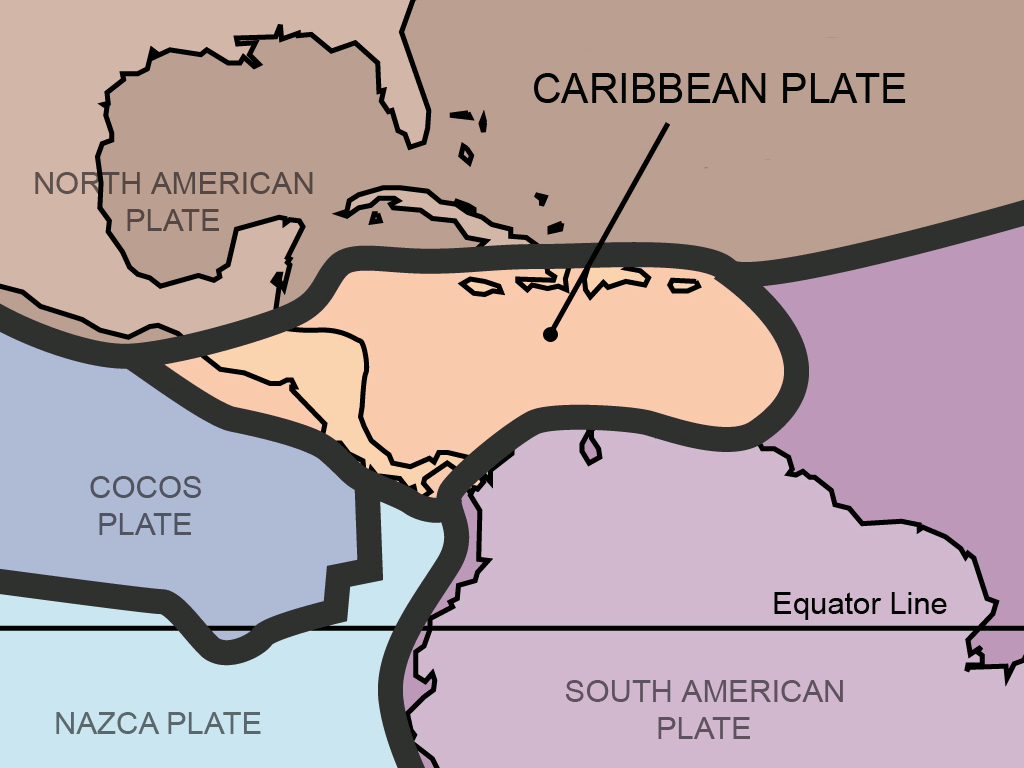
The trench lies at the convergence of the Cocos, Nazca, North American, and Caribbean plates

The Middle America Trench is a major subduction zone, an oceanic trench in the eastern Pacific Ocean off the southwestern coast of Middle America, stretching from central Mexico to Costa Rica. The trench is 1,700 miles (2,750 km) long and is 21,880 feet (6,669 m) at its deepest point. The trench is the boundary between the Rivera, Cocos, and Nazca plates on one side and the North American and Caribbean plates on the other. It is the 18th-deepest trench in the world. Many large earthquakes have occurred in the area of the Middle America Trench.

== Division ==
The Middle America Trench can be divided into a northern and a southern section. The division, however, is not the same in its seaward side and its landward side. In the seaward side, the northern section, called the Acapulco Trench, runs from Jalisco to the Tehuantepec Ridge, and the southern section, called the Guatemala Trench, runs from the Tehuantepec Ridge to the Cocos Ridge. On the landward side, the division is demarcated along the Polochic-Motagua fault system (see Motagua Fault), the boundary between the North American plate and the Caribbean plate. The dividing point in the landward side is about 400 km east of that in the seaward side.
