= Richard Fenwick =

Richard Fenwick may refer to:

- Richard Fenwick (footballer), English footballer
- Richard Fenwick (bishop) (born 1943), Anglican bishop
- Richard Fenwick (engineer), a New Zealand engineer and academic
