= Mark Cooper (judge) =

New Zealand lawyer and jurist

The Honourable Sir Mark Cooper KNZM KC
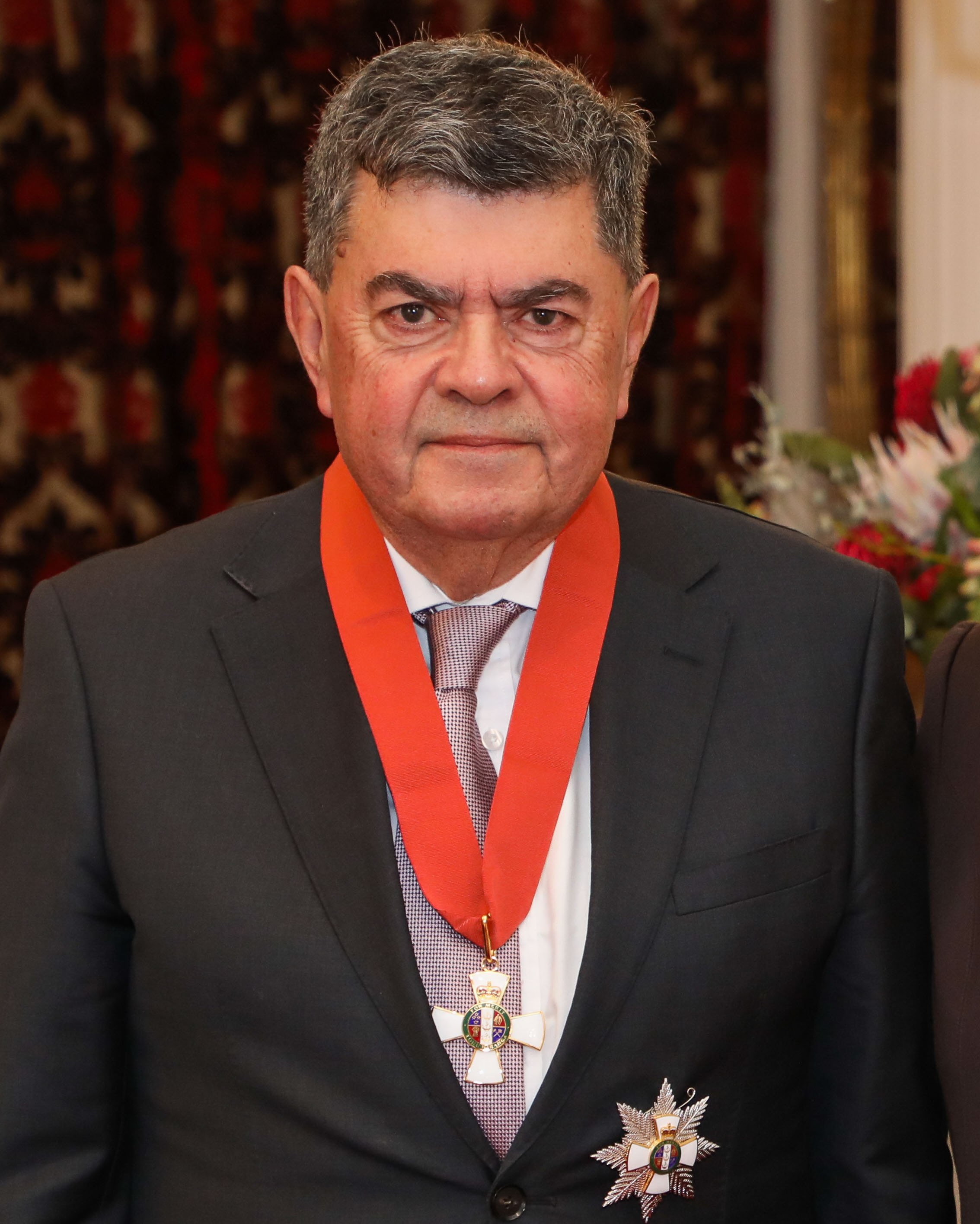
- Cooper in 2025

President of the Court of Appeal
- In office 26 April 2022 – 20 November 2024
- Preceded by: Stephen Kós
- Succeeded by: Christine French

Personal details
- Born: Mark Leslie Smith Cooper
- Education: University of Auckland

Sir Mark Leslie Smith Cooper KNZM KC is a New Zealand jurist. He was appointed a High Court judge in 2004, and a judge of the Court of Appeal in 2014. He served as president of the Court of Appeal from 2022 to 2024.

== Biography ==
Cooper is of Ngāti Māhanga descent, an iwi of Waikato Tainui. He received his tertiary education at the University of Auckland, graduating with Bachelor of Laws (Hons) and Magister Juris (Dist) degrees in 1979. After university, he worked for Butler White & Hanna, where he became a partner in 1983; the law firm merged with Simpson Grierson where he remained a partner. From 1997, he practised as a barrister sole. He was principal legal advisor for three Auckland territorial authorities: Auckland City Council, North Shore City Council, and Rodney District Council. In the 2000 appointment round, he was appointed Queen's Counsel alongside six others.

In 2004, Cooper was appointed a high court judge by the attorney general, Margaret Wilson, and sat in Auckland from August that year. Following the 2011 Christchurch earthquake, Cooper was appointed by the government to chair the Canterbury Earthquakes Royal Commission; the other commissioners were engineers Ron Carter and Richard Fenwick. He was appointed a judge of the Court of Appeal in 2014, and was named to replace Stephen Kós as president of the Court of Appeal from 26 April 2022.

Cooper was on the executive of the Auckland Division of the Cancer Society of New Zealand. He was on the establishment board for Metrowater, which was formed in 1997 and has since been integrated into Watercare Services. Cooper was board member for the Museum of Transport and Technology and the Auckland Observatory and Planetarium Trust.

On 23 October 2024, Cooper was granted retention of the title "The Honourable" for life, in recognition of his service as a judge and president of the Court of Appeal and a judge of the High Court. He was succeeded as president of the Court of Appeal by Christine French on 21 November 2024.

In the 2025 King’s Birthday Honours, Cooper was appointed a Knight Companion of the New Zealand Order of Merit, for services to the judiciary.

== See also ==
- List of King's and Queen's Counsel in New Zealand
