= Christine French =

New Zealand lawyer and judge (born 1958)

The Honourable Christine French
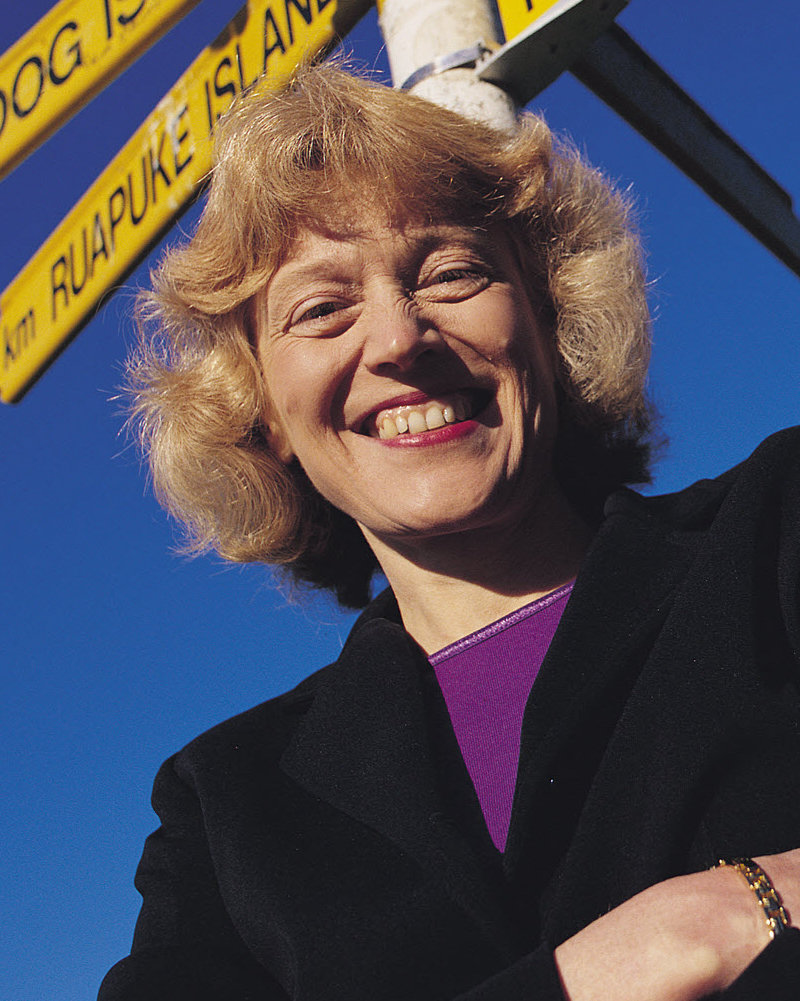
- French in 2002

President of the Court of Appeal
- Incumbent
- Assumed office 21 November 2024
- Preceded by: Mark Cooper

Judge of the Court of Appeal
- Incumbent
- Assumed office 6 August 2012

Personal details
- Born: 1958 (age 67–68)
- Education: University of Otago; University of Oxford

Christine Ruth French (born 1958) is a New Zealand lawyer and judge, serving as the president of the Court of Appeal since 21 November 2024. She has been a judge of the Court of Appeal since 2012, having been a judge of the High Court since 2008.

French has degrees from the University of Otago (1981) and the University of Oxford (1983), studying at the latter as a Rhodes scholar. In 2014, she received an honorary doctorate from the University of Otago.

On 23 October 2024, French was named as the president of the Court of Appeal, effective from 21 November 2024.
