= Miho Wada =

Japanese-born jazz musician

Miho Wada is a Japanese-born jazz musician from New Zealand. She plays flute and both alto and tenor saxophone, and is a founding member of Miho's Jazz Orchestra, which has toured internationally. She has been nicknamed "the flute ninja" for her fast playing style.

== Early life ==
Born in Japan, Wada began taking piano lessons at the age of four. In 1995, Wada's father – an enthusiastic fan of New Zealand rugby and yachting – decided to move the family to Burnside, Christchurch in New Zealand. When Wada's parents hired a new piano teacher for her, their chosen instructor also happened to play flute, which was how Wada first took an interest in the instrument.

== Career ==
After earning a Bachelor of Music degree, Wada moved to London, England, to pursue further study at the Trinity College of Music.

In 2007, Wada was selected to attend a Swiss summer academy for classical flute held by virtuoso flautist Sir James Galway. Despite being excited at the opportunity, Wada found herself feeling out of place among the other students at the academy, and afterwards began exploring jazz and world music venues. Meeting a group of Cuban musicians, Wada eventually decided to travel to Cuba, where she found a new flute teacher:

"I had to relearn everything. After three months, I totally got it. It was all about the blood flow, the rhythm of the blood. It was about finding a way of playing the flute that was most natural to me. I found my passion as a musician and what made me happy."

Wada has been nicknamed "the flute ninja" for her ability to play very fast music on the flute, a skill she attributes to her musical training in Cuba. In addition to playing flute, she also plays alto and tenor saxophone.

In 2009, Wada returned to New Zealand and settled down in Auckland. Soon afterwards, she formed a punk-rock-ska band called Miho Wada and the Shit Fight, and the ensemble toured for the next couple of years. In 2011, she formed the new six-person band Miho's Jazz Orchestra, and the group raised funds for Christchurch earthquake recovery work. Miho's Jazz Orchestra has continued to perform steadily since then, touring New Zealand, Australia and Japan, and the group's musical style is described as "a combination of Afro-Cuban and J-pop, influenced by contemporary jazz".

== Discography ==
=== Miho's Jazz Orchestra ===
- Para Tí (2011)
- Wanderland (2012)
- EXIT 621 (2013)
- Mystery Banana (2014)
- Memphis Dreamin' (2014)
- Live at the Lab (2014)
- Bumpy Road (2015)
- New World Sympathy (2016)

== Personal life ==
Wada is married to violinist Pascal Roggen, who plays as part of Miho's Jazz Orchestra. In 2015, Wada gave birth to a son.
