= 2011 Christchurch earthquake =

February 2011 earthquake in New Zealand

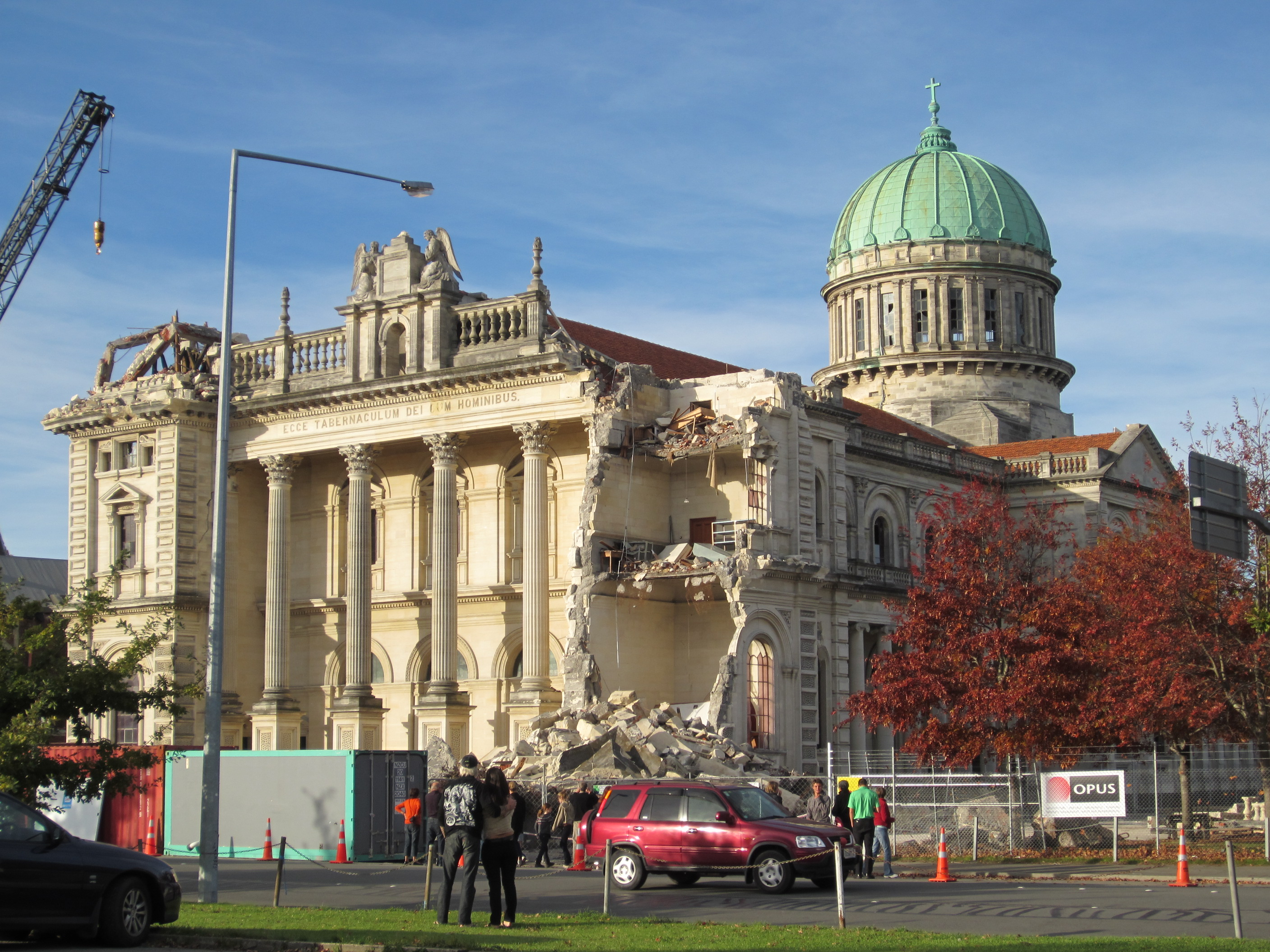
- Damaged Catholic cathedral two months after the earthquake

- Location within New Zealand
- UTC time: 2011-02-21 23:51:42
- ISC event: 16168897
- USGS-ANSS: ComCat
- Local date: 22 February 2011
- Local time: 12:51 p.m. NZDT
- Magnitude: 6.2 M_{w}^{(GCMT)} 6.1 M_{w}^{(USGS)}
- Depth: 5 km (3.1 mi)
- Epicentre: 43.583°S 172.680°E; Port Hills near Christchurch, Canterbury Region, New Zealand
- Areas affected: New Zealand
- Max. intensity: MMI XI (Extreme)
- Peak acceleration: 1.51 g
- Tsunami: 3.5 m (11 ft) tsunami waves in the Tasman Lake, following quake-triggered glacier calving from Tasman Glacier
- Landslides: Sumner and Redcliffs
- Casualties: 185 deaths ~4,400–7,200 injuries

A major earthquake occurred in Christchurch on Tuesday 22 February 2011 at 12:51 p.m. local time (23:51 UTC, 21 February). The M_{w} 6.2 (M_{L} 6.3) earthquake struck the Canterbury Region in the South Island, centred 6.7 kilometres (4.2 mi) south-east of the central business district. It caused widespread damage across Christchurch and killed 185 people, making it New Zealand's fifth-deadliest disaster. Scientists classified it as an intraplate earthquake and a potential aftershock of the September 2010 Canterbury earthquake.

Christchurch's central city and eastern suburbs were badly affected, with damage to buildings and infrastructure already weakened by the 2010 Canterbury earthquake and its aftershocks. Significant liquefaction affected the eastern suburbs, producing around 400,000 tonnes of silt. The earthquake was felt across the South Island and parts of the lower and central North Island. While the initial quake only lasted for approximately 10 seconds, the damage was severe because of the location and shallowness of the earthquake's focus in relation to Christchurch as well as previous quake damage. Subsequent population loss saw the Christchurch main urban area fall behind the Wellington equivalent, to decrease from second- to third-most populous area in New Zealand. Adjusted for inflation, the 2010–2011 Canterbury earthquakes caused over $54.8 billion in damage, making it New Zealand's costliest natural disaster and one of the most expensive disasters in history.

== Geology ==
Location of the 12:51 pm quake epicentre in Christchurch

The 2011 Christchurch Earthquake was a 6.3-magnitude intraplate earthquake. It may have been an aftershock of the 7.1-magnitude 4 September 2010 Canterbury earthquake. New Zealand's GNS Science has stated that the earthquake was part of the aftershock sequence that had been occurring since the September magnitude-7.1 quake, however a seismologist from Geoscience Australia considers it a separate event given its location on a separate fault system.

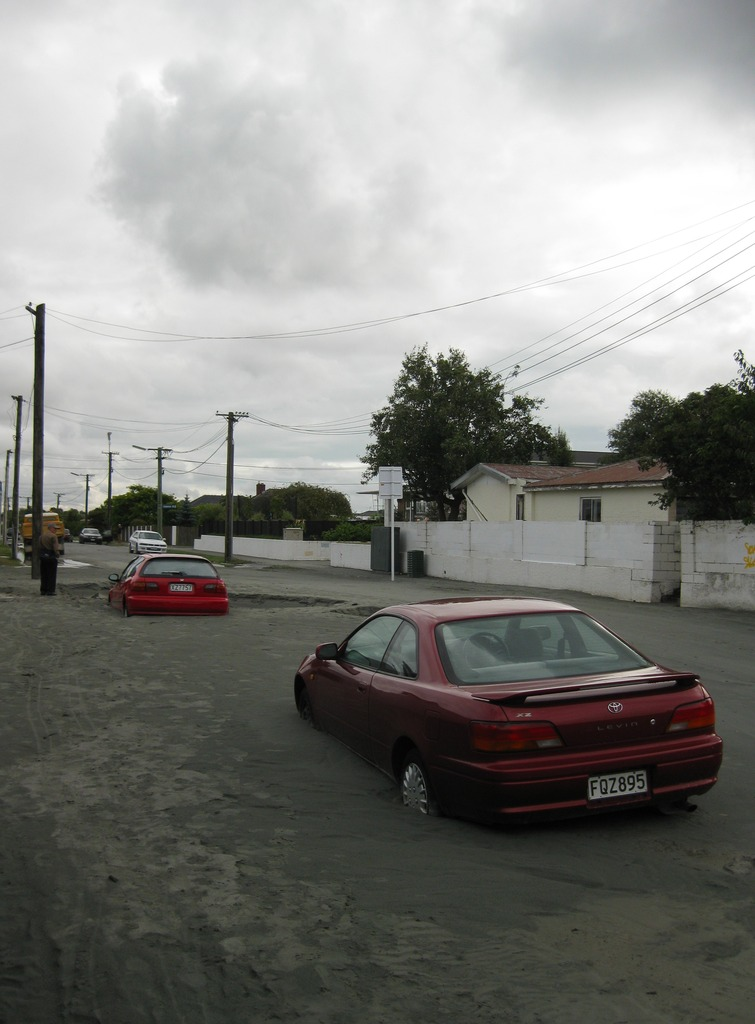
Results of liquefaction; the fine washed-up sand solidifies after the water has run off

Although smaller in magnitude than the 2010 earthquake, the February earthquake was more damaging and deadly for a number of reasons. The hypocentre was closer to Christchurch and was shallower, 5 kilometres (3 mi) underground, whereas the September quake was measured as having a depth of 10 kilometres (6 mi). The February earthquake occurred during lunchtime on a weekday when the CBD was busy, and many buildings were already weakened from the previous quakes. The peak ground acceleration (PGA) was extremely high, and simultaneous vertical and horizontal ground movement was "almost impossible" for buildings to survive intact. Liquefaction was significantly greater than that of the 2010 quake, causing the upwelling of more than 200,000 tonnes of silt which needed to be cleared. The increased liquefaction caused significant ground movement, undermining many foundations and destroying infrastructure, damage which "may be the greatest ever recorded anywhere in a modern city". 80% of the water and sewerage system was severely damaged. The earthquake also caused an increased spring activity in the Avon River / Ōtākaro and Ōpāwaho / Heathcote River.

=== Fault ===
GNS Science stated that the earthquake "arose from the rupture of an 8 km x 8 km fault running east-northeast at a depth of 1–2 km beneath the southern edge of the Avon-Heathcote Estuary and dipping southwards at an angle of about 65 degrees from the horizontal beneath the Port Hills."

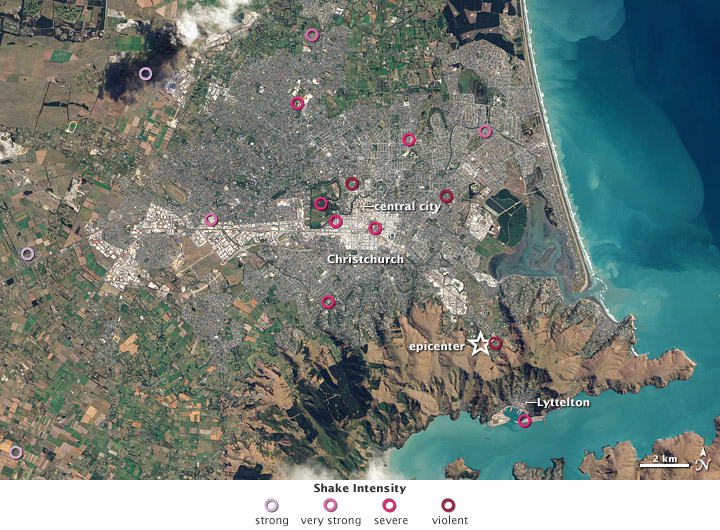
Satellite picture showing shaking strength (click to enlarge)

While both the 2010 and 2011 earthquakes occurred on "blind" or unknown faults, New Zealand's Earthquake Commission had, in a 1991 report, predicted moderate earthquakes in Canterbury with the likelihood of associated liquefaction.

=== Intensity ===
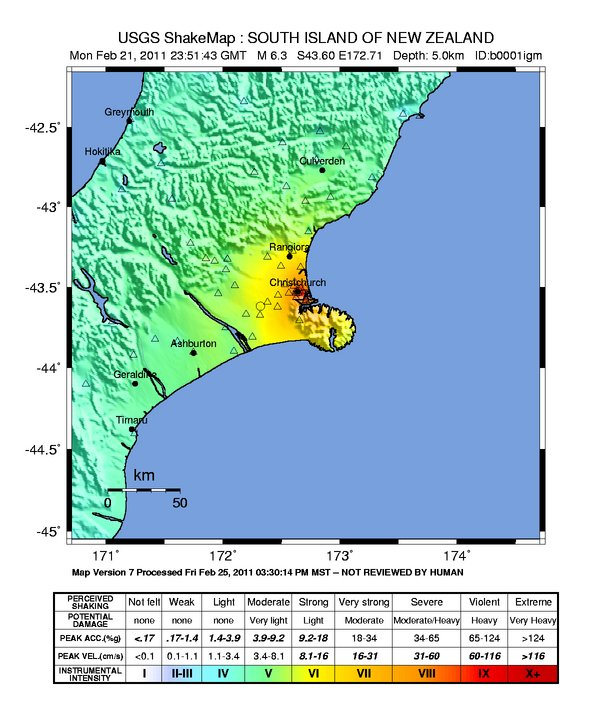
Earthquake intensity map

Initial measurement of peak ground acceleration (PGA) in central Christchurch exceeded 1.8 g (i.e. 1.8 times the acceleration of gravity), with the highest recording 2.2 g, at Heathcote Valley Primary School, a shaking intensity equivalent to MMI X+. Subsequent analysis revised the Heathcote Valley Primary School acceleration down to 1.37 g, with the 1.89 g reading at Pages Road Pumping Station in Christchurch revised down to 1.51 g. Nevertheless, these were the highest PGAs ever recorded in New Zealand; the highest reading during the September 2010 event was 1.26 g, recorded near Darfield. The PGA is also one of the greatest-ever ground accelerations recorded in the world, and was unusually high for a 6.2 quake, and the highest in a vertical direction. The central business district (CBD) experienced PGAs in the range of 0.574 and 0.802 g. As a comparison, the 7.0 M_{w} 2010 Haiti earthquake had an estimated PGA of 0.5 g. The acceleration occurred mainly in a vertical direction, with eyewitness accounts of people being tossed into the air.

Based on the local intensity reports, the maximum intensity assigned was XI (Extreme).

The upwards (positive acceleration) was greater than the downwards, which had a maximum recording of 0.9 g; the maximum recorded horizontal acceleration was 1.7 g. The force of the earthquake was "statistically unlikely" to occur more than once in 1000 years, according to one seismic engineer, with a PGA greater than many modern buildings were designed to withstand. Although the rupture was subsurface, satellite images indicated that the net displacement of the land south of the fault was 50 cm westwards and upwards; the land movement would have been greater during the earthquake. Land movement was varied around the area horizontally—in both east and west directions—and vertically; the Port Hills were raised by 40 cm.

The earthquake was a "strike-slip event with oblique motion" which caused mostly horizontal movement with some vertical movement, with reverse thrust causing upwards vertical movement. The vertical acceleration was far greater than the horizontal acceleration.

At the time of the earthquake, the New Zealand building code required a building with a 50-year design life to withstand predicted loads of a 500-year event. Initial reports by GNS Science suggested that ground motion "considerably exceeded even 2500-year design motions", beyond maximum considered events (MCE). By comparison, the 2010 quake—in which damage was predominantly to pre-1970s buildings—exerted 65% of the design loading on buildings. The acceleration experienced in February 2011 would "totally flatten" most world cities, causing massive loss of life; in Christchurch, New Zealand's stringent building codes limited the disaster. It is also possible that "seismic lensing" contributed to the ground effect, with the seismic waves rebounding off the hard basalt of the Port Hills back into the city. Geologists reported liquefaction was worse than the 2010 earthquake.

=== Aftershocks ===
The earthquake generated a significant series of its own aftershocks. More than 361 aftershocks occurred in the first week following the magnitude 6.3 earthquake.

- The largest was a magnitude 5.9 tremor which occurred just under two hours after the main earthquake.
- A 5.3-magnitude aftershock on 16 April, the largest for several weeks, caused further damage, including power cuts and further rock falls on the Port Hills.
- An aftershock centred near Rolleston measuring M_{w} 4.9 (M_{L} 5.3) hit the region on 10 May. It caused minor damage to buildings in the city centre and was felt as far away as Dunedin and Greymouth, but no casualties were reported.
- On 6 June, a large aftershock measuring 5.5 on the Richter scale occurred and was felt as far away as Kaikōura and Oamaru. It caused liquefaction in the eastern suburbs and 20,000 homes to lose power.
- A series of aftershocks occurred on 13 June. A tremor of 5.7 on the Richter scale was felt at 1 pm NZT, with a depth of 9 km, and its epicentre being at Taylors Mistake. A 6.0 tremor occurred just over an hour later, with a depth of 7 km, located 5 km south-east of the city. Power was cut to around 54,000 homes, with further damage and liquefaction in already weakened areas. The Lyttelton Timeball Station collapsed and Christ Church Cathedral sustained more damage. At least 46 people were reported injured. These were followed by a magnitude 5.4 quake at a depth of 8 km and centred 10 km south-west of Christchurch at 10:34 pm on 21 June 2011.
- 23 December 2011 featured another series of strong shocks, including a 5.8 at 1:58 pm and a 5.9 at 3:18 pm. The earthquakes interrupted power and water supplies, three unoccupied buildings collapsed and there was again liquefaction in eastern suburbs and rockfalls in hill areas. One person died after tripping on uneven ground caused by the earthquake.

Below is a list of all aftershocks of Richter, moment, and body-wave magnitudes 5.0 and above that occurred in the region between 22 February 2011 and 15 January 2012.

Date	Time	Richter magnitude (M_{L})	Moment magnitude (M_{w})	Body-wave magnitude	Epicentre	Depth (km)	Depth (miles)	Modified Mercalli
22 February 2011	12:51 pm	6.3	6.2	6.3	10 km south of Christchurch	5.0 km	3.1 miles	XI. Extreme
22 February 2011	1:04 pm	5.8	5.5	5.5	10 km south of Christchurch	5.9 km	3.6 miles	VII. Very strong
22 February 2011	2:50 pm	5.9	5.6	5.6	Within 5 km of Lyttelton	6.72 km	4.1 miles	VII. Very strong
22 February 2011	2:51 pm	5.1	4.5	4.4	Within 5 km of Lyttelton	7.3 km	4.5 miles	VI. Strong
22 February 2011	4:04 pm	5.0	4.5	4.4	Within 5 km of Christchurch	12.0 km	7.4 miles	VI. Strong
22 February 2011	7:43 pm	5.0	4.4	4.5	20 km south-east of Christchurch	12.0 km	7.4 miles	VI. Strong
5 March 2011	7:34 pm	5.0	4.6	4.5	10 km south-east of Christchurch	9.5 km	5.9 miles	VI. Strong
20 March 2011	9:47 pm	5.1	4.5	4.5	10 km east of Christchurch	11.83 km	7.3 miles	VI. Strong
16 April 2011	5:49 pm	5.3	5.0	5.2	20 km south-east of Christchurch	10.6 km	6.5 miles	VI. Strong
30 April 2011	7:04 am	5.2	4.9	4.7	60 km north-east of Christchurch	8.7 km	5.4 miles	VI. Strong
10 May 2011	3:04 am	5.2	4.9	5.0	20 km west of Christchurch	14.4 km	8.9 miles	VI. Strong
6 June 2011	9:09 am	5.5	5.1	5.1	20 km south-west of Christchurch	8.1 km	5.0 miles	VI. Strong
13 June 2011	1:00 pm	5.9	5.3	5.0	10 km south-east of Christchurch	8.9 km	5.5 miles	VIII. Severe
13 June 2011	2:20 pm	6.4	6.0	6.0	10 km south-east of Christchurch	6.9 km	4.2 miles	VIII. Severe
13 June 2011	2:21 pm	5.1	4.8	4.8	10 km south-east of Christchurch	10.2 km	6.4 miles	VI. Strong
15 June 2011	6:27 am	5.2	4.8	5.0	20 km south-east of Christchurch	5.8 km	3.5 miles	VI. Strong
21 June 2011	10:34 pm	5.4	5.2	5.2	10 km south-west of Christchurch	8.3 km	5.2 miles	VI. Strong
22 July 2011	5:39 am	5.3	4.7	4.7	40 km west of Christchurch	12 km	7.4 miles	VI. Strong
2 September 2011	3:29 am	5.0	4.6	4.5	10 km east of Lyttelton	7.6 km	4.7 miles	VI. Strong
9 October 2011	8:34 pm	5.5	4.9	5.0	10 km north-east of Diamond Harbour	12.0 km	7.4 miles	VI. Strong
23 December 2011	1:58 pm	5.9	5.8	5.8	20 km north-east of Lyttelton	8 km	4.9 miles	VIII. Severe
23 December 2011	2:06 pm	5.3	5.4	5.4	21 km east-north-east of Christchurch	10.1 km	6.2 miles	VII. Very strong
23 December 2011	3:18 pm	6.2	6.0	5.9	10 km north of Lyttelton	6 km	3.7 miles	VIII. Severe
23 December 2011	4:50 pm	5.1	4.7	4.8	20 km east of Christchurch	10 km	6.2 miles	VI. Strong
24 December 2011	6:37 am	5.1	4.9	5.1	10 km east of Akaroa	9 km	5.5 miles	VI. Strong
2 January 2012	1:27 am	5.1	4.8	4.9	20 km north-east of Lyttelton	13.3 km	8.2 miles	VI. Strong
2 January 2012	5:45 am	5.3			20 km north-east of Lyttelton	13.5 km	8.3 miles	VII. Very strong
2 January 2012	5:45 am	5.6	5.1	5.1	20 km north-east of Lyttelton	13.5 km	8.3 miles	VII. Very strong
6 January 2012	2:22 am	5.0	4.5	4.6	20 km north-east of Lyttelton	6.7 km	4.0 miles	VI. Strong
7 January 2012	1:21 am	5.3	4.8	5.0	20 km east of Christchurch	8.4 km	5.2 miles	VI. Strong
15 January 2012	2:47 am	5.1	4.6	4.5	10 km east of Christchurch	5.8 km	3.6 miles	VI. Strong

== Damage and effects ==
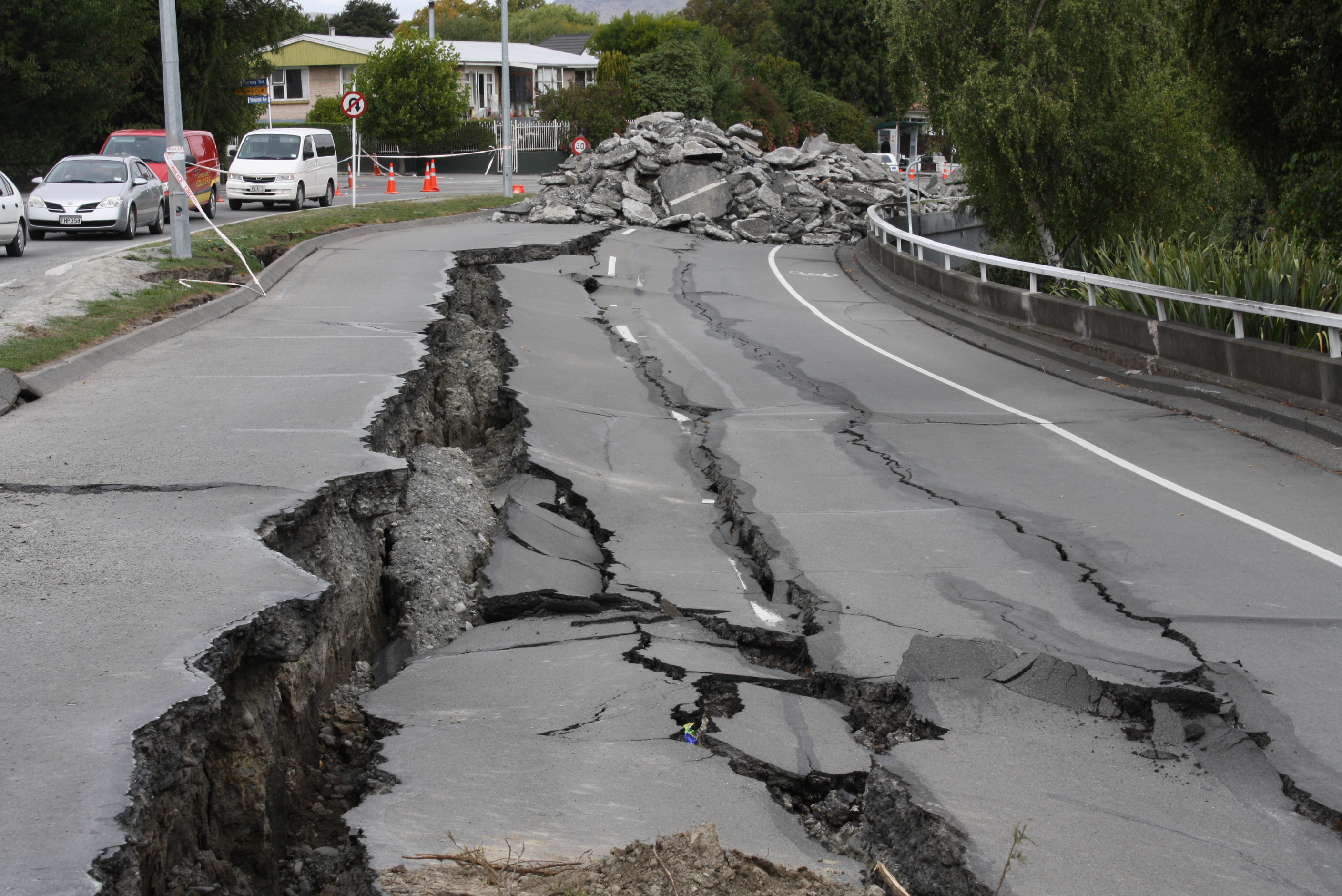
Liquefaction adjacent to the Avon River / Ōtākaro caused lateral spread in Fitzgerald Avenue, causing severe damage.

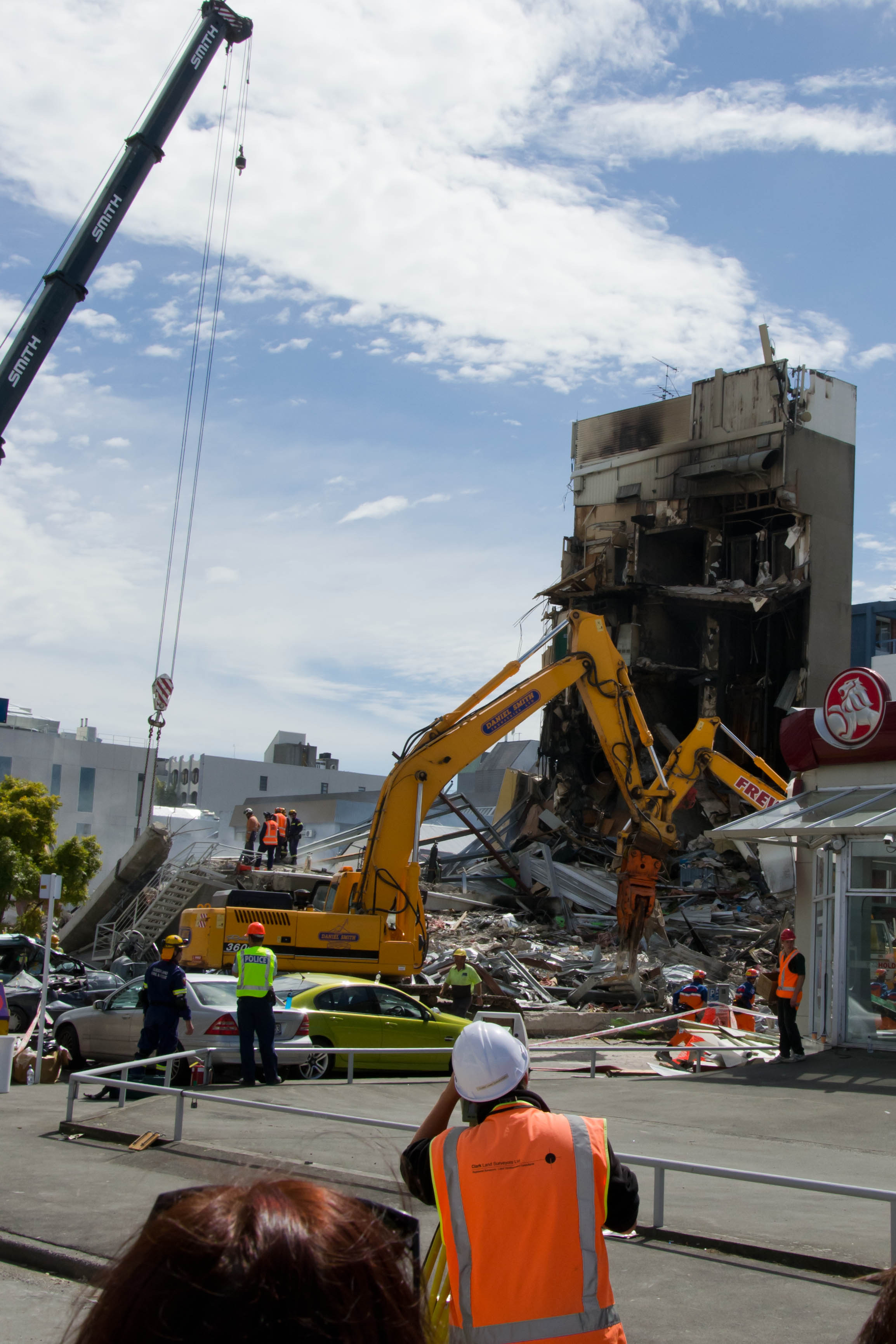
115 bodies were recovered from the CTV Building, which collapsed during the quake.

Road and bridge damage occurred and hampered rescue efforts. Soil liquefaction and surface flooding also occurred. Road surfaces were forced up by liquefaction, and water and sand were spewing out of cracks. A number of cars were crushed by falling debris. In the central city, two buses were crushed by falling buildings. Because the earthquake hit during the lunch hour, some people on the footpaths were buried by collapsed buildings.

=== Central city ===
Damage occurred to many older buildings, particularly those with unreinforced masonry and those built before stringent earthquake codes were introduced. On 28 February 2011, the Prime Minister announced that there would be an inquiry into the collapse of buildings that had been signed off as safe after the previous earthquake on 4 September 2010, "to provide answers to people about why so many people lost their lives."

Of the 3,000 buildings inspected within the Four Avenues which bound the central business district by 3 March 2011, 45% had been given red or yellow stickers to restrict access because of the safety problems. Many heritage buildings were given red stickers after inspections. As of February 2015, there had been 1240 demolitions within the bounds of the Four Avenues since the September 2010 earthquakes.

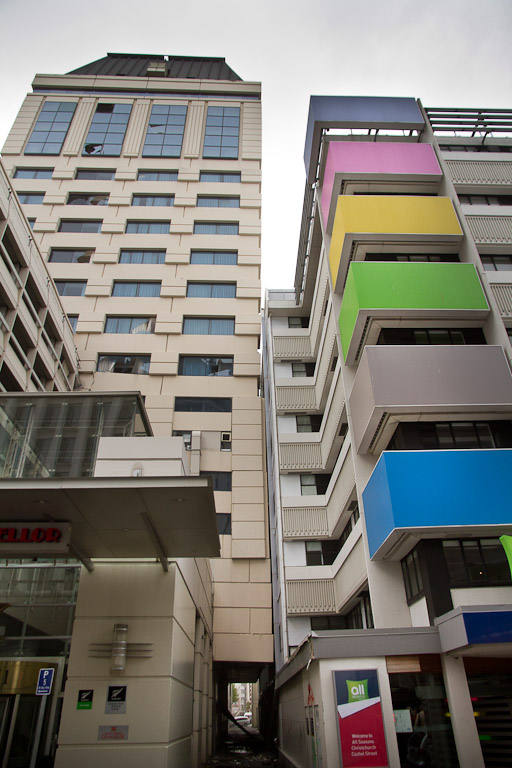
The Grand Chancellor had to be demolished.

The six-storey Canterbury Television (CTV) building collapsed in the earthquake, leaving only its lift shaft standing, which caught fire. One hundred and fifteen people died in the building, which housed a TV station, a medical clinic and an English language school. On 23 February police decided that the damage was not survivable, and rescue efforts at the building were suspended. Fire-fighting and recovery operations resumed that night, later joined by a Japanese search and rescue squad. Twelve Japanese students from the Toyama College of Foreign Languages died in the building collapse. A government report later found that the building's construction was faulty and should not have been approved.

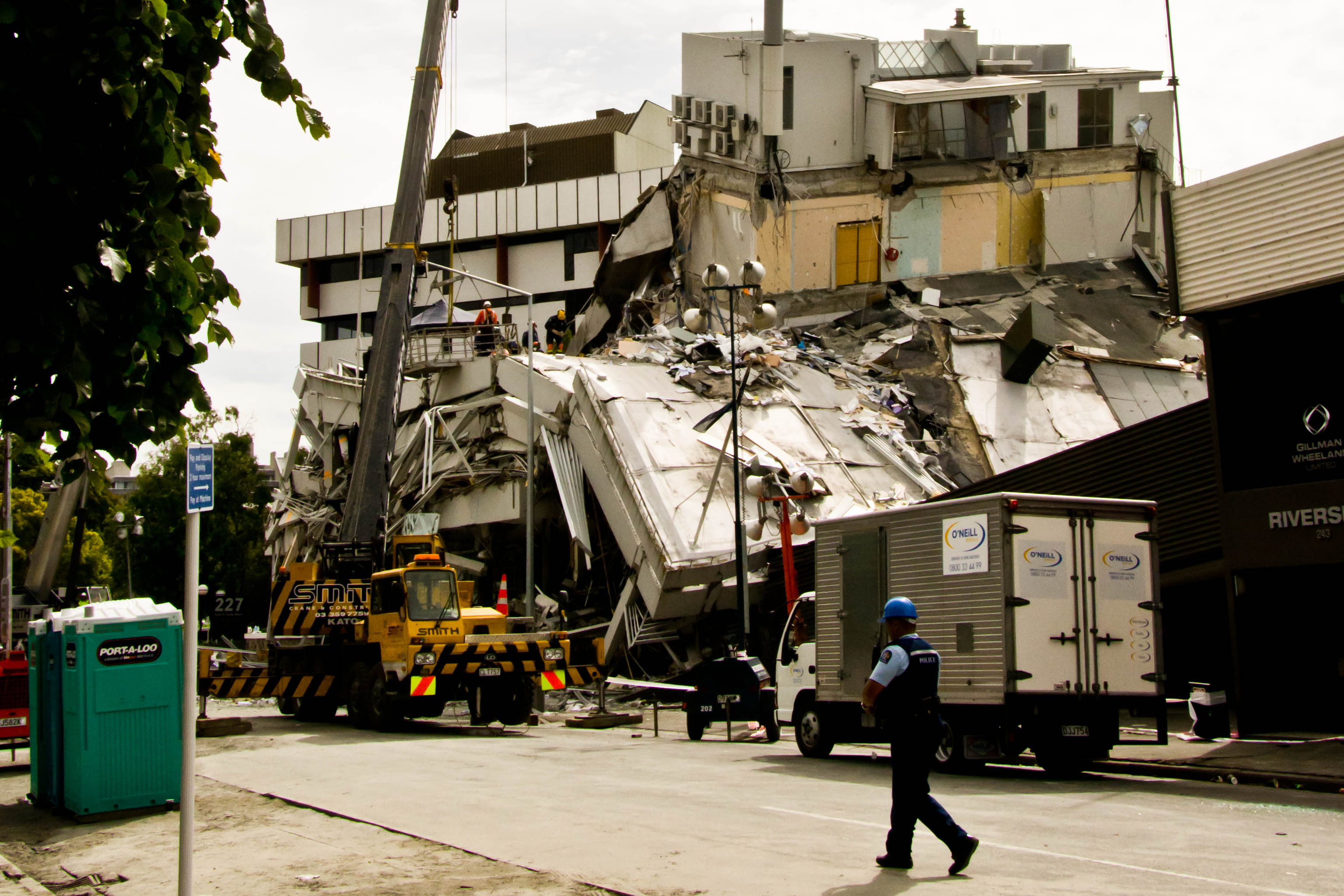
PGC Building, following the February 2011 quake

The five-storey PGC Building (Pyne Gould Corporation House) on Cambridge Terrace, headquarters of Pyne Gould Corporation, collapsed, with 18 casualties. On Wednesday morning, 22 hours after the quake, a survivor was pulled from the rubble. The reinforced concrete building had been constructed in 1963–1964.

The Forsyth Barr Building survived the earthquake but many occupants were trapped after the collapse of the stairwells, forcing some to abseil out after the quake. Search of the building was technically difficult for urban search and rescue (USAR) teams, requiring the deconstruction of 4-tonne stair sets, but the building was cleared with no victims discovered.

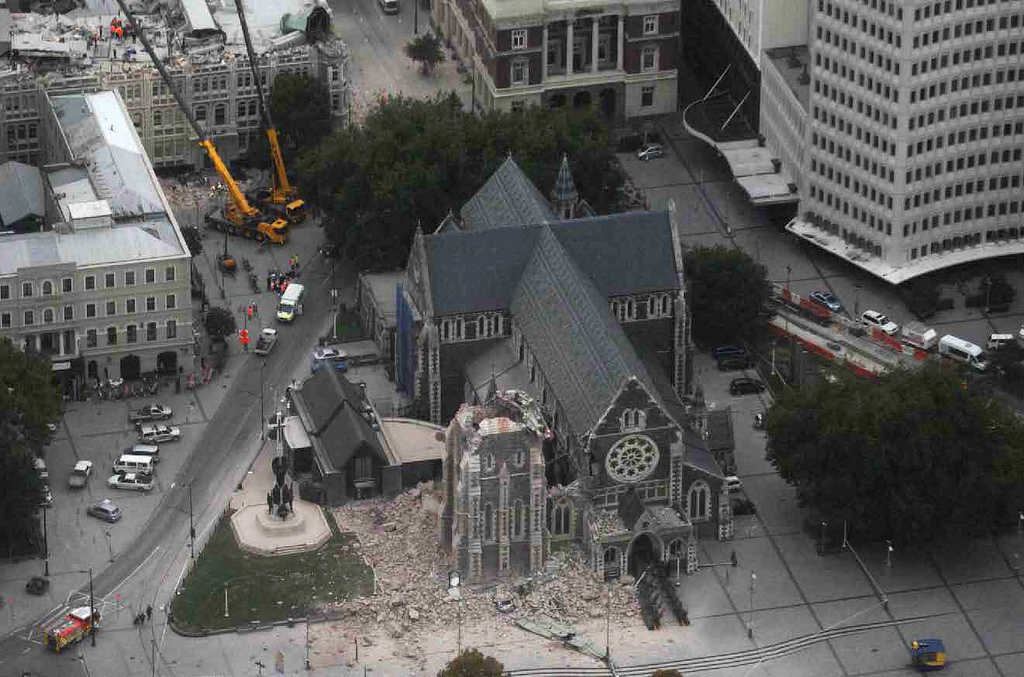
The Anglican ChristChurch Cathedral was severely damaged in the earthquake.

The earthquake destroyed the ChristChurch Cathedral's spire and part of its tower, and severely damaged the structure of the remaining building. The remainder of the tower was demolished in April 2012. The west wall suffered collapses in the June 2011 earthquake and the December 2011 quake due to a steel structure – intended to stabilise the rose window – pushing it in. The Anglican Church decided to demolish the building and replace it with a new structure, but various groups opposed the church's intentions, with actions including taking a case to court. While the judgements were mostly in favour of the church, no further demolition occurred after the removal of the tower in early 2012. Government expressed its concern over the stalemate and appointed an independent negotiator and in September 2017, the Christchurch Diocesan Synod announced that ChristChurch Cathedral will be reinstated after promises of extra grants and loans from local and central government. By mid-2019 early design and stabilisation work had begun.

On 23 February, Hotel Grand Chancellor, Christchurch's tallest hotel, was reported to be on the verge of collapse. The 26-storey building was displaced by half a metre in the quake and had dropped by 1 metre on one side; parts of the emergency stairwells collapsed. The building was thought to be irreparably damaged and have the potential to bring down other buildings if it fell; an area of a two-block radius around the hotel was thus evacuated. The building was eventually stabilised and, on 4 March it was decided the building would be demolished over the following six months, so that further work could be done with the buildings nearby. Demolition was completed in May 2012. The 21-storey PricewaterhouseCoopers building, the city's tallest office tower, was among the office buildings to be later demolished.

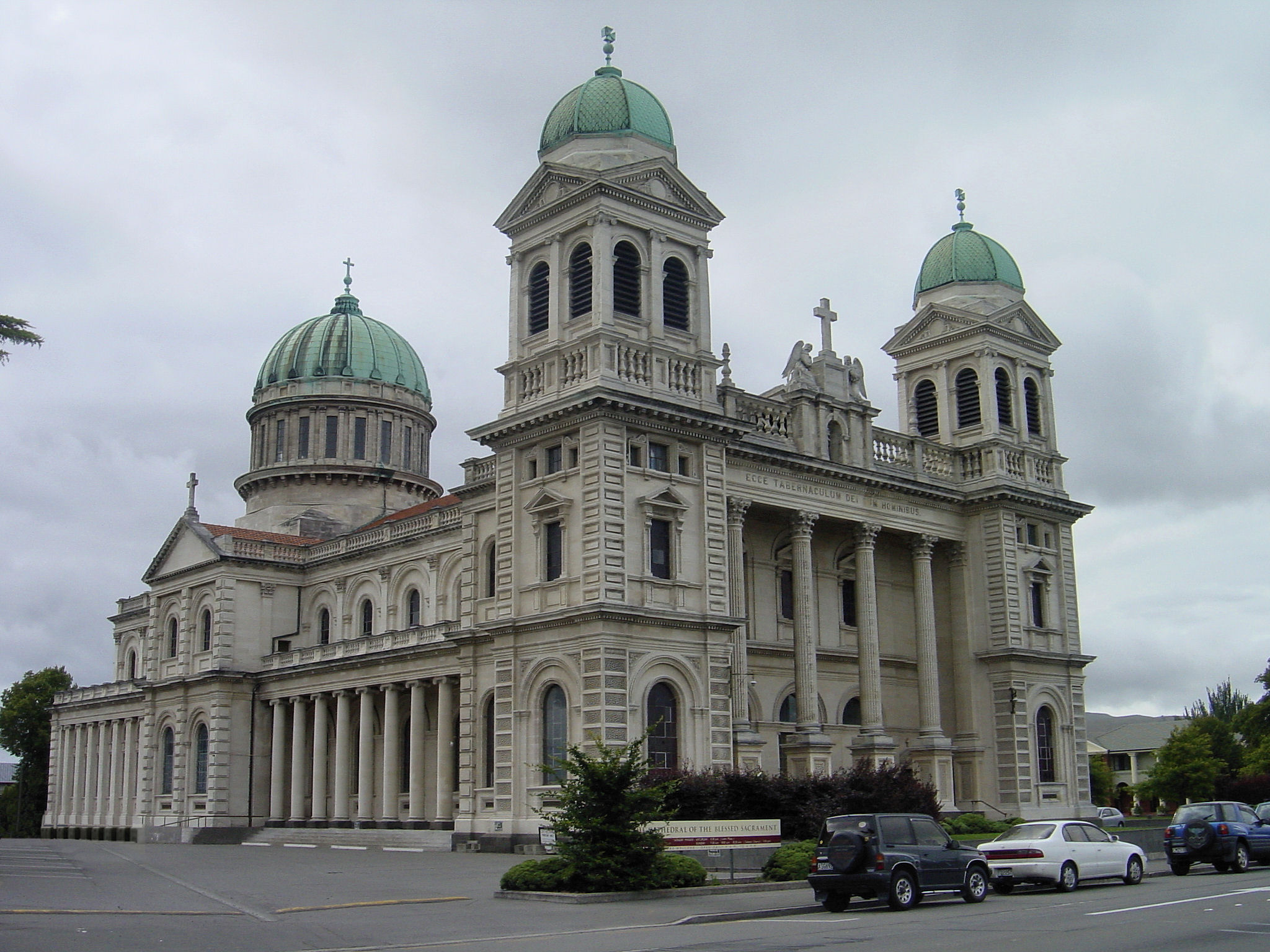
The Cathedral of the Blessed Sacrament before the earthquake

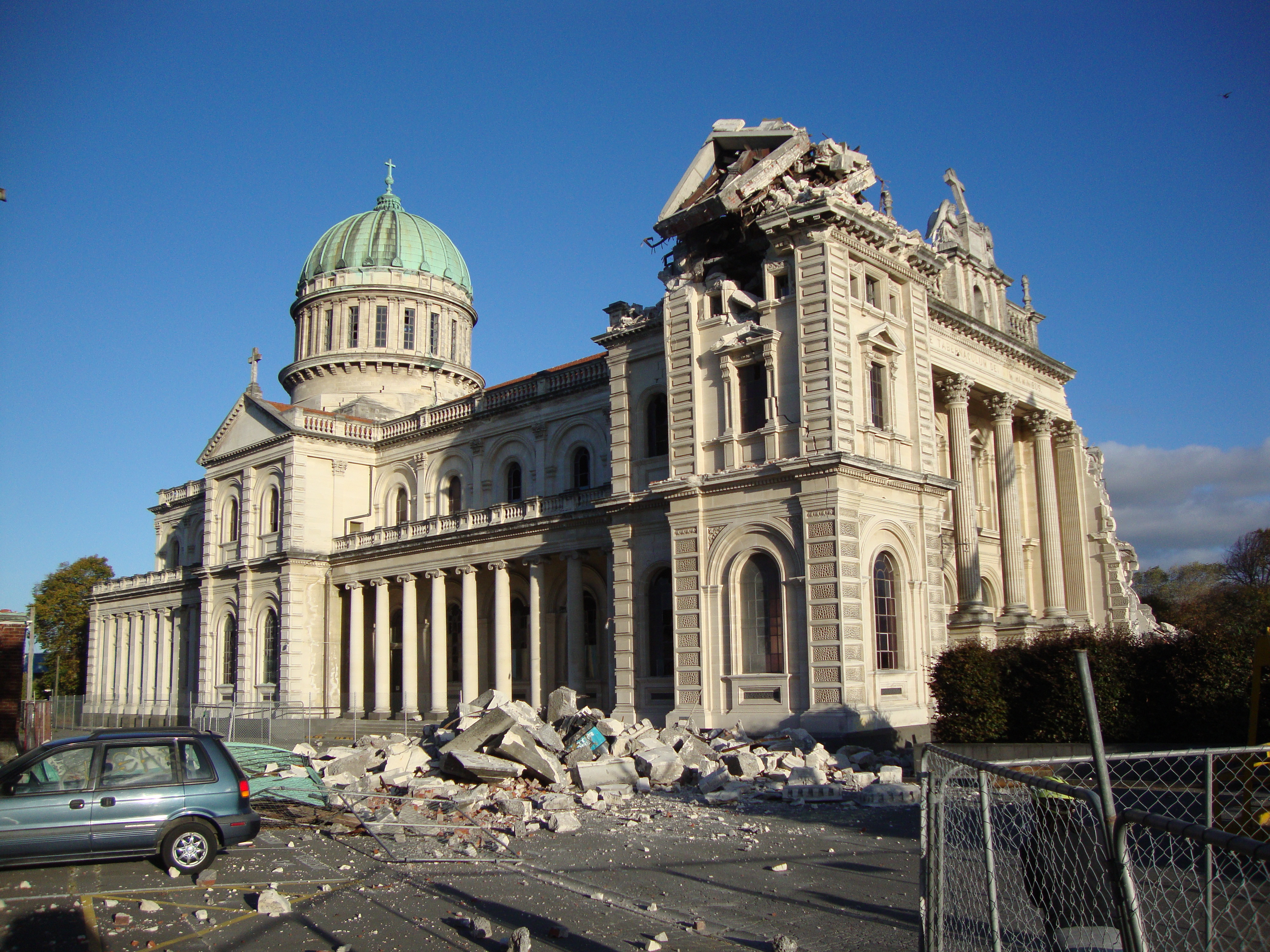
The Cathedral of the Blessed Sacrament after the earthquake

The Carlton Hotel, a listed heritage building, was undergoing repairs after the September 2010 earthquake damage when the February 2011 earthquake damaged the building further. It was deemed unstable and demolished in April 2011. St Elmo Courts had been damaged in the September 2010 earthquake and the owner intended to repair the building, but further damage caused by the February 2011 event resulted in a decision to demolish, which was done the following month.

The historic Canterbury Provincial Council Buildings were severely damaged, with the Stone Chamber collapsing.

The Civic, the council's third home, was heavily damaged in February and was demolished. Both Our City and the Civic are on the register of Heritage New Zealand.

The Catholic Cathedral of the Blessed Sacrament was also severely damaged, with the towers falling. A decision was made to remove the dome because the supporting structure was weakened. The building was demolished in 2020.

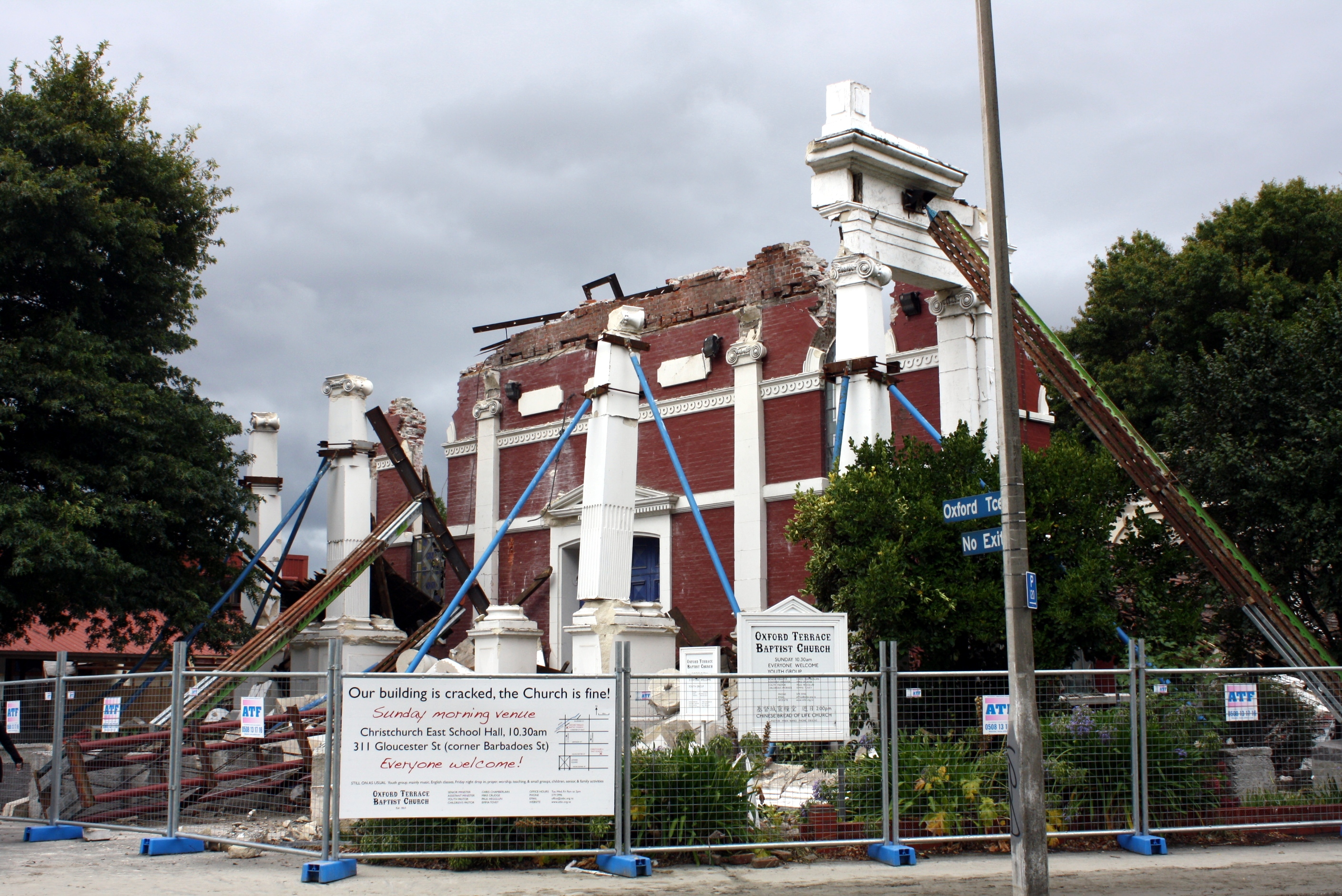
Oxford Terrace Baptist Church was one of many churches damaged by the quake.

Several other churches were seriously damaged, including: Knox Presbyterian Church, St Luke's Anglican Church, Durham Street Methodist Church, St Paul's-Trinity-Pacific Presbyterian Church, Oxford Terrace Baptist Church, Holy Trinity Avonside and Holy Trinity, Lyttelton. Sydenham Heritage Church and the Beckenham Baptist Church were heavily damaged, and then demolished days after the earthquake. Concrete block construction fared badly, leaving many modern iconic buildings damaged.

=== Suburbs ===
On 7 March, Prime Minister John Key said that around 10,000 houses would need to be demolished, and liquefaction damage meant that some parts of Christchurch could not be rebuilt on.

Residential red zone

Several areas in and around Christchurch were deemed infeasible to rebuild due to earthquake damage resulting from soil liquefaction and rockslides in the 2010 and 2011 earthquakes. These areas were placed into residential red zones. Through voluntary buyouts, the Crown and insurers demolished or removed over 8,000 homes. The last demolition was completed in October 2021.

Lyttelton

Buildings in Lyttelton sustained widespread damage, with a fire officer reporting that 60% of the buildings in the main street had been severely damaged. Two people died on local walking tracks after being hit by rockfalls. The town's historic Timeball Station was extensively damaged, adding to damage from the preceding earthquake in September 2010. The station collapsed on 13 June 2011 after a magnitude 6.0 aftershock. In 2013, it was announced that the tower and ball would be restored, and that funds were to be sought from the community to rebuild the rest of the station. The restoration was completed in 2018 with the site being reopened in November.

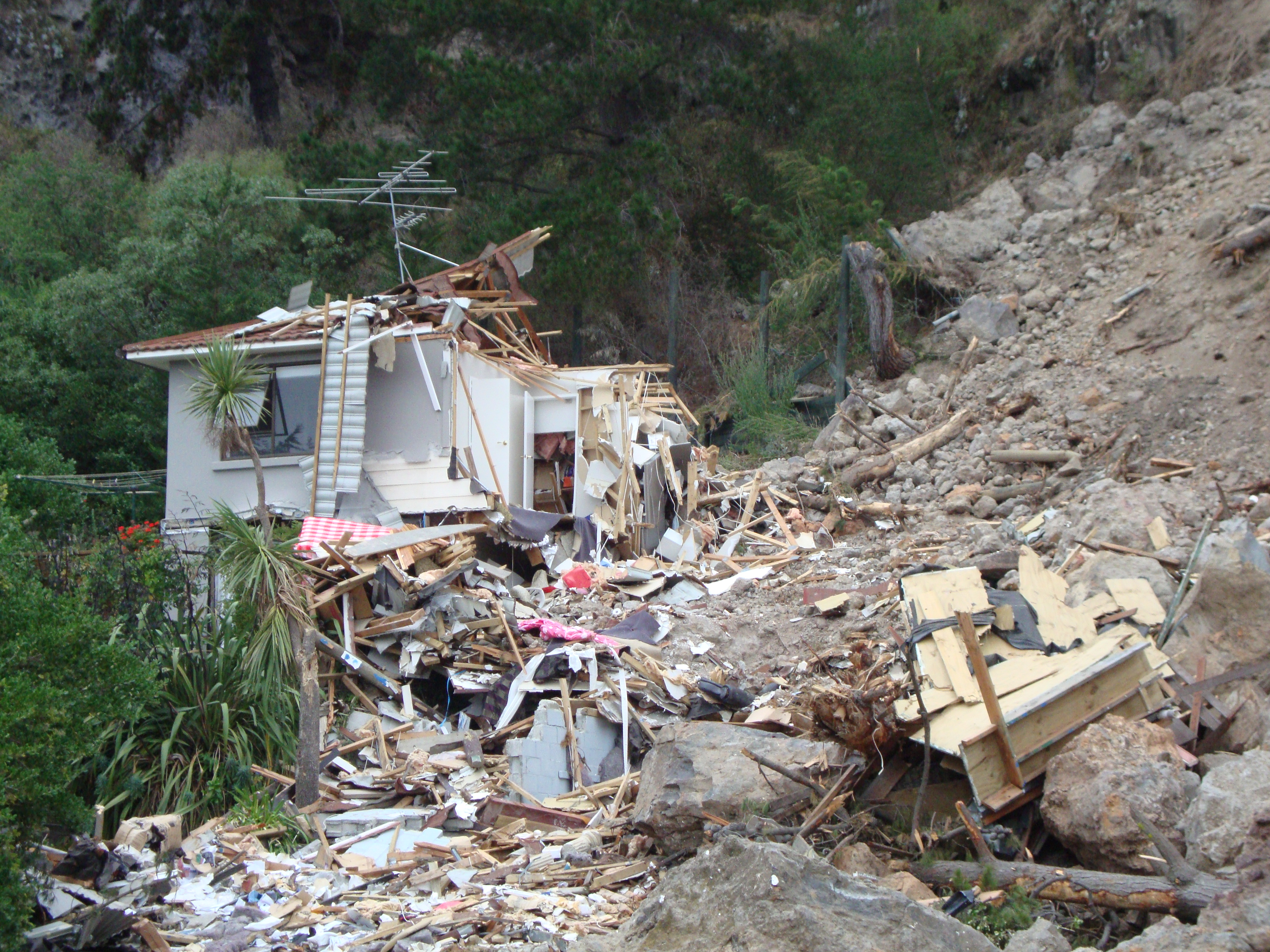
54 Raekura Place in Redcliffs was destroyed by rockfall.

Sumner

Landslides occurred in Sumner, crushing buildings. Parts of Sumner were evacuated during the night of 22 February after cracks were noticed on a nearby hillside. Three deaths were reported in the Sumner area, according to the Sumner Chief Fire Officer. The Shag Rock, a notable landmark, was reduced to half of its former height.

Redcliffs

In contrast to the September 2010 earthquake, Redcliffs and the surrounding hills suffered severe damage. The cliff behind Redcliffs School collapsed onto the houses below. Large boulders were found on the lawns of damaged houses.

Twelve streets in Redcliffs were evacuated on the night of 24 February 2011 after some cliffs and hills surrounding Redcliffs were deemed unstable.

Redcliffs Primary School, then located at 140 Main Road, right under the cliffs, was moved to Van Asch Deaf Education Centre, 4.5 km from the main site soon afterwards. After 9 years, the school was moved to Redcliffs Park, reopening in July 2020. The cost of the rebuild was $16 million.

=== Beyond Christchurch ===
The quake was felt as far north as Tauranga and as far south as Invercargill, where the 111 emergency network was rendered out of service.

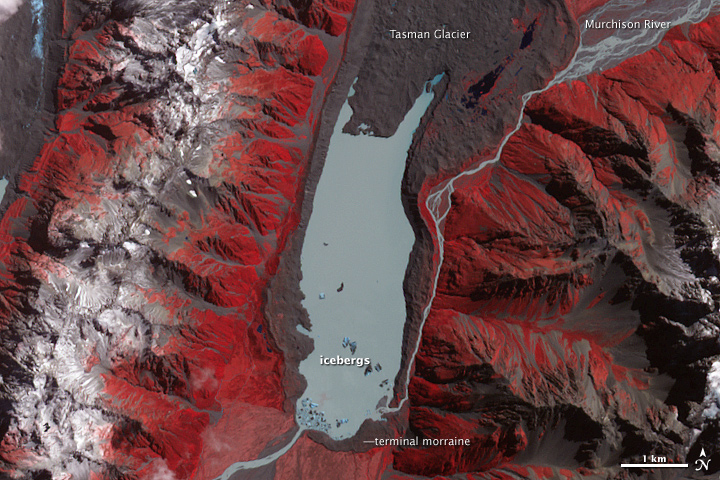
Satellite image showing icebergs calved from Tasman Glacier by earthquake

At the Tasman Glacier some 200 kilometres (120 miles) from the epicentre, around 30 million tonnes (33 million ST) of ice tumbled off the glacier into Tasman Lake, hitting tour boats with tsunami waves 3.5 metres (11 ft) high.

KiwiRail reported that the TranzAlpine service was terminating at Greymouth and the TranzCoastal terminating at Picton. The TranzAlpine was cancelled until 4 March, to allow for personnel resources to be transferred to repairing track and related infrastructure, and moving essential freight into Christchurch, while the TranzCoastal was cancelled until mid-August. KiwiRail also delayed 14 March departure of its Interislander ferry Aratere to Singapore for a 30-metre (98 ft) extension and refit prior to the 2011 Rugby World Cup. With extra passenger and freight movements over Cook Strait following the earthquake, the company would have been unable to cope with just two ships operating on a reduced schedule so soon after the earthquake, so pushed back the departure to the end of April.

== Casualties ==
The earthquake killed 185 people, from more than 20 countries. Over half of the deaths occurred in the six-storey Canterbury Television (CTV) Building, which collapsed and caught fire in the earthquake. A state of local emergency was initially declared by the Mayor of Christchurch, which was superseded when the government declared a state of national emergency, which stayed in force until 30 April 2011.

Of the 185 victims, 115 people died in the CTV Building alone, while another 18 died in the collapse of the PGC Building, and eight were killed when masonry fell on Red Bus number 702 in Colombo Street. In each of these cases the buildings that collapsed were known to have been appreciably damaged in the September 2010 earthquake but the local authority had permitted the building to be re-occupied (CTV and PGC buildings) or protective barriers adjacent to them moved closer to areas at risk of falling debris (Colombo Street). An additional 28 people were killed in various places across the city centre, and twelve were killed in suburban Christchurch. Due to the injuries sustained some bodies remained unidentified. Between 6,600 and 6,800 people were treated for minor injuries, and Christchurch Hospital alone treated 220 major trauma cases connected to the quake. Rescue efforts continued for over a week, then shifted into recovery mode. The last survivor was pulled from the rubble the day after the quake.

Location	Deaths
Canterbury Television building	115
Pyne Gould Corporation building	18
Colombo Street	10
Red Bus #702	8
Cashel Street	4
Manchester Street	4
Lichfield Street	3
Methodist Mission Church	3
Elsewhere in Central City (The Four Avenues)	4
Outside the Four Avenues	12
Unlocated	4
Total	185

The nationalities of the deceased are as follows.

Country	Deaths
New Zealand – Christchurch – Waimakariri & Selwyn – rest of NZ	97; 87; 8; 2
Japan	28
China	23
Philippines	11
Thailand	6
Israel	3
Korea	2
Canada; Ireland; Malaysia; Peru; Romania; Russia; Serbia; Taiwan; Turkey; United States	1 each
No nationality recorded	5
Total	185

== Emergency management ==
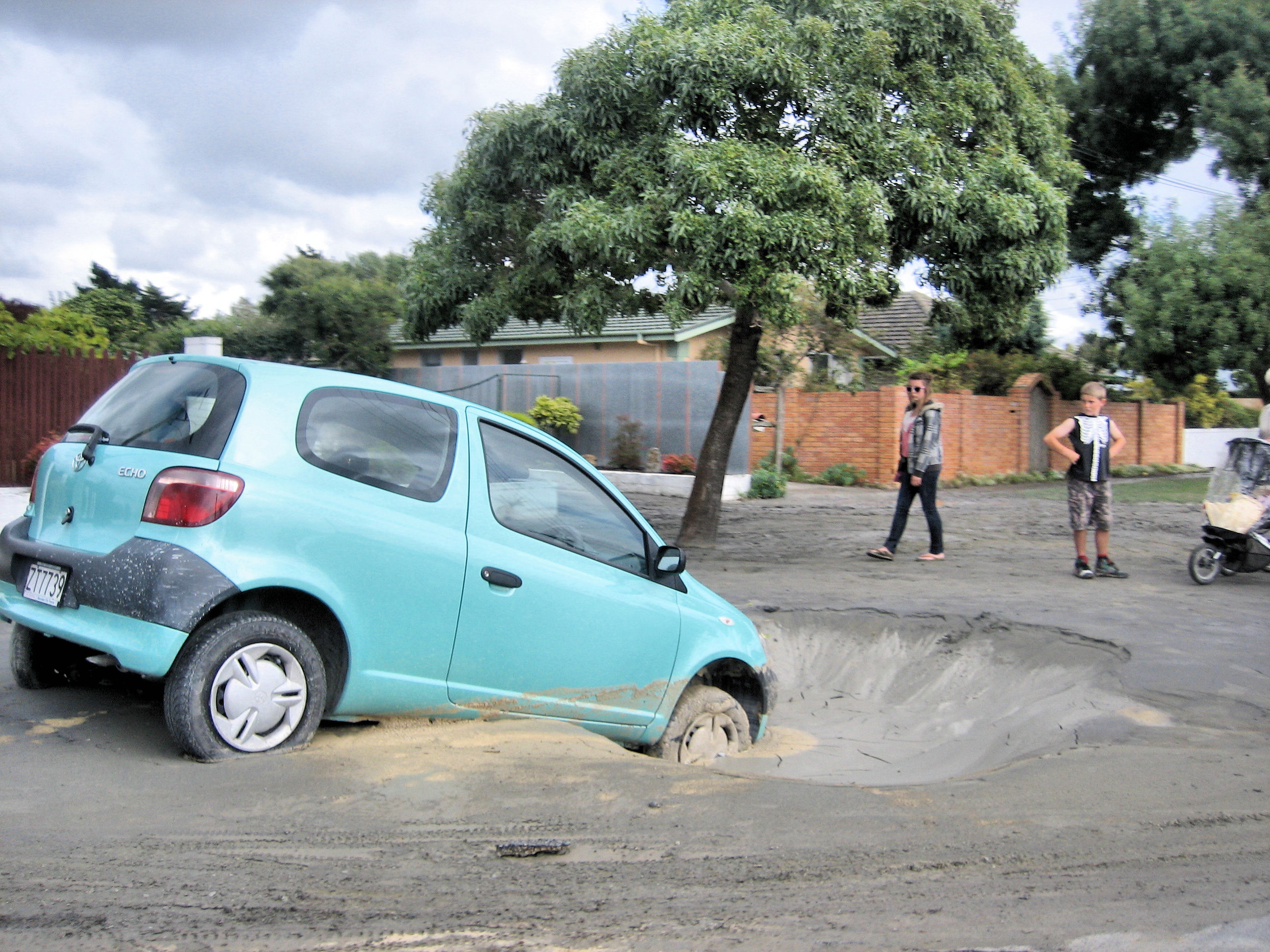
The effect of liquefaction in North New Brighton, Christchurch

Immediately following the earthquake, 80% of Christchurch was without power. Water and wastewater services were disrupted throughout the city, with authorities urging residents to conserve water and collect rainwater. Prime Minister John Key confirmed that, "All Civil Defence procedures have now been activated; the Civil Defence bunker at parliament is in operation here in Wellington." On 23 February the Minister of Civil Defence, John Carter declared the situation a state of national emergency, only the second time that New Zealand had declared a national civil defence emergency; the first occasion was the 1951 waterfront dispute. The New Zealand Red Cross launched an appeal to raise funds to help victims. A full response management structure was put in place within minutes of the quake, with the Christchurch City Council's alternate Emergency Operations Centre re-established in the City Art Gallery and the regional Canterbury CDEM Group Emergency Coordination Centre (ECC) activated in its post-earthquake operational facility adjacent to the Canterbury Regional Council offices. Within two hours of the quake national co-ordination was operating from the National Crisis Management Centre located in the basement of the Beehive in Wellington.

A composite "Christchurch Response Centre" was established in the Christchurch Art Gallery, a modern earthquake-resilient building in the centre of the city which had sustained only minor damage. Meanwhile, the Canterbury CDEM Group ECC had relocated to the fully operational University of Canterbury Innovation (UCi3) building to the West of the city, when the Copthorne Hotel adjacent to the Regional Council offices threatened to fall onto the offices and ECC. Once the composite Christchurch Coordination Centre was established on 23 February the CDEM Group Controllers and ECC personnel relocated to the City Art Gallery to supplement the management personnel available to the National Controller.

As per the protocols of New Zealand's Coordinated Incident Management System, the Civil Defence Emergency Management Act, and the National Civil Defence Emergency Management Plan and Guide, Civil Defence Emergency Management became lead agency—with the Director of the Ministry of Civil Defence & Emergency Management John Hamilton as National Controller. CDEM were supported by local authorities, New Zealand Police, Fire Service, Defence Force and many other agencies and organisations.

Gerry Brownlee, a Cabinet Minister and an MP from Christchurch, had his regular portfolios distributed amongst other cabinet ministers so that he could focus solely on earthquake recovery.

=== Establishment of Red Zone ===
A Central City Red Zone was established on the day of the earthquake as a public exclusion zone in central Christchurch. Both COGIC, French Civil Protection and the American USGS requested the activation of the International Charter on Space and Major Disasters on the behalf of MCDEM New Zealand, thus readily providing satellite imagery for aid and rescue services.

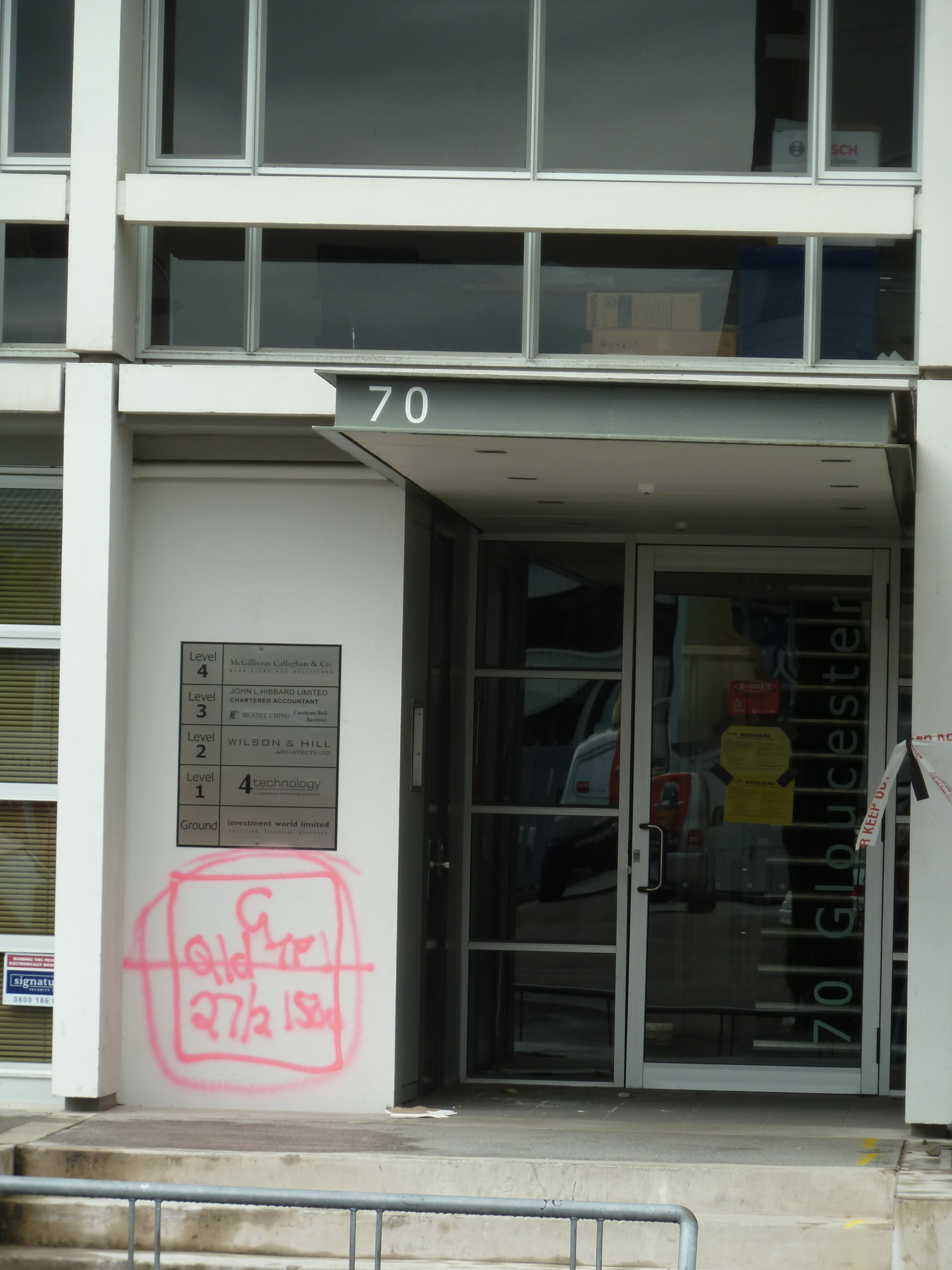
Search and rescue mark on earthquake damaged building confirming all present have been accounted for

=== Police ===
Christchurch Police were supplemented by staff and resources from around the country, along with a 323-strong contingent of Australian Police, who were sworn in as New Zealand Police on their arrival, bringing the total number of officers in the city to 1200. Many of them received standing ovations from appreciative locals as they walked through Christchurch Airport upon arrival. Alongside regular duties, the police provided security cordons, organised evacuations, supported search and rescue teams, missing persons and family liaison, and organised media briefings and tours of the affected areas. They also provided forensic analysis and evidence gathering at fatalities and Disaster Victim Identification (DVI) teams, working closely with pathologists, forensic dentists and scientists, and the coroner at the emergency mortuary established at Burnham Military Camp. They were aided by DVI teams from Australia, UK, Thailand, Taiwan and Israel.

=== Search and rescue ===
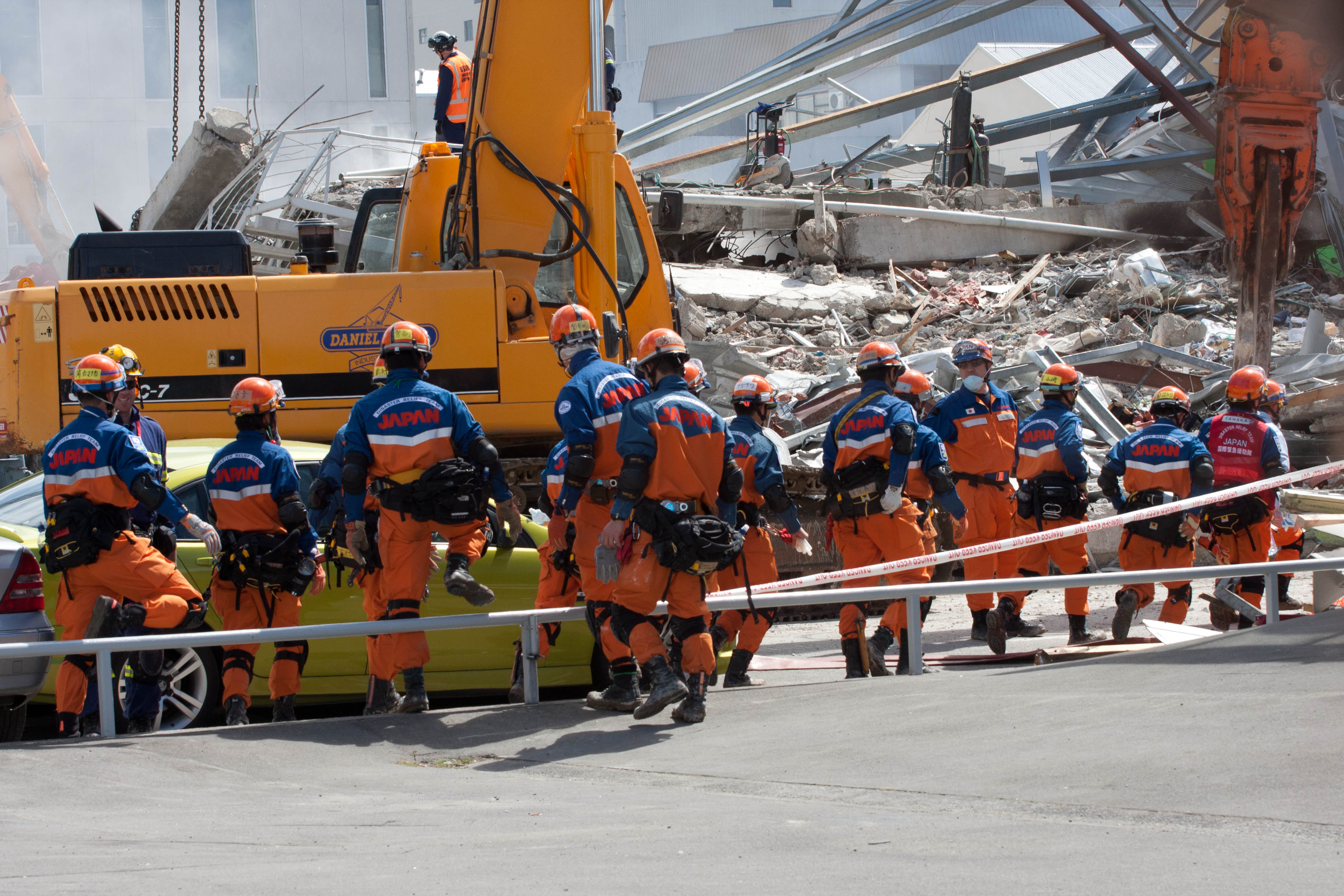
A Japanese search and rescue team approaches the ruins of the CTV building.

The New Zealand Fire Service coordinated search and rescue, with support from the Urban Search and Rescue (USAR) teams from New Zealand, Australia, United Kingdom, United States, Japan, Taiwan, China and Singapore, totalling 150 personnel from New Zealand and 429 from overseas. They also responded to fires, serious structural damage reports, and landslides working with structural engineers, seismologists and geologists, as well as construction workers, crane and digger operators and demolition experts.

NSW Task Force 1, a team of 72 urban search and rescue specialists from New South Wales, Australia, was sent to Christchurch on two RAAF C-130J Hercules, arriving 12 hours after the quake. A second team of 70 from Queensland, Queensland Task Force 1, (including three sniffer dogs), was sent the following day on board a RAAF C-17. A team of 55 Disaster Assistance and Rescue Team members from the Singapore Civil Defence Force were sent. The United States sent Urban Search and Rescue California Task Force 2, a 74-member heavy rescue team consisting of firefighters and paramedics from the Los Angeles County Fire Department, doctors, engineers and 26 tons of pre-packaged rescue equipment. Japan sent 70 search-and-rescue personnel including specialists from the coastguard, police and fire fighting service, as well as three sniffer dogs. The team left New Zealand earlier than planned due to the 9.0 earthquake which struck Japan on 11 March 2011. The United Kingdom sent a 53 strong search and rescue team including nine Welsh firefighters who had assisted the rescue effort during the 2010 Haiti earthquake. Taiwan sent a 22-member team from the National Fire Agency, along with two tons of specialist search and rescue equipment. China sent a 10-member specialist rescue team.

=== Defence forces ===
The New Zealand Defence Force—staging their largest-ever operation on New Zealand soil— provided logistics, equipment, transport, airbridges, evacuations, supply and equipment shipments, survey of the Port and harbour, and support to the agencies, including meals; they assisted the Police with security, and provided humanitarian aid particularly to Lyttelton, which was isolated from the city in the first days. Over 1400 Army, Navy and Air Force personnel were involved, and Territorials (Army Reserve) were called up. They were supplemented by 116 soldiers from the Singapore Army, in Christchurch for a training exercise at the time of the earthquake, who assisted in the cordon of the city.

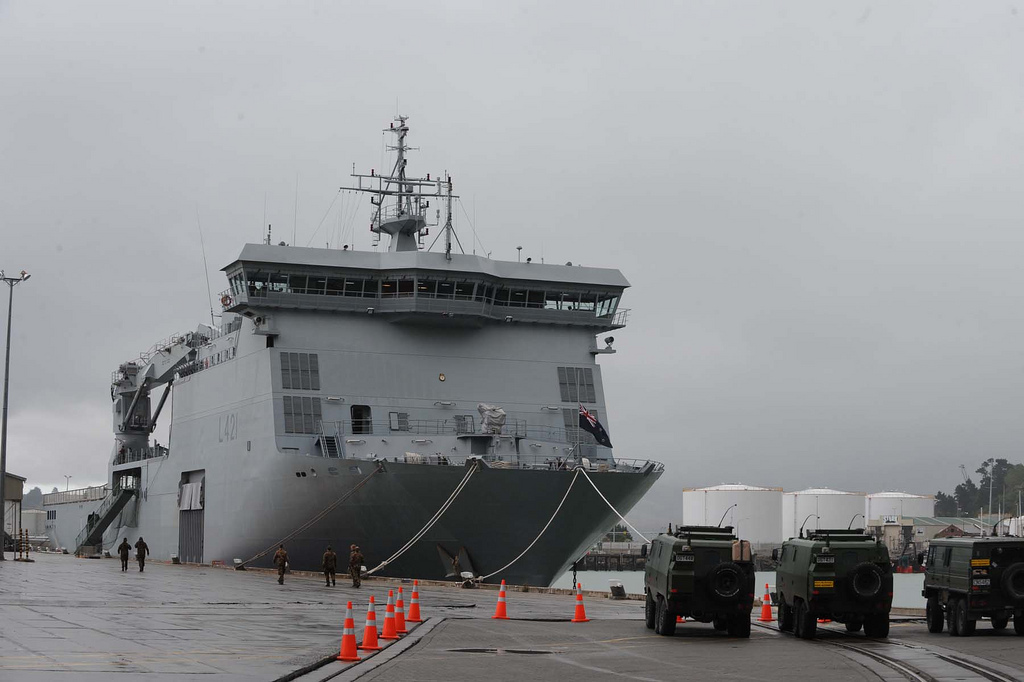
HMNZS Canterbury provided aid to Lyttelton residents isolated by the quake.

The Royal New Zealand Air Force provided an air bridge between Christchurch and Wellington using two Boeing 757 and three C-130 Hercules, and bringing in emergency crews and equipment and evacuating North Island residents and tourists out of Christchurch. One P-3 Orion was deployed in the initial stages of the disaster to provide images and photographs of the city. Three RNZAF Bell UH-1H Iroquois helicopters were also used to transport Police, VIP's and aid to locations around Christchurch. Three RNZAF Beechcraft Super King Air aircraft were also used to evacuate people from Christchurch. The crew of the Navy ship Canterbury, in Lyttelton harbour at the time of the earthquake, provided meals for 1,000 people left homeless in that town, and accommodation for a small number of locals. The Royal Australian Air Force also assisted with air lifts. On one of their journeys, an RAAF Hercules sustained minor damage in an aftershock.

The army also operated desalination plants to provide water to the eastern suburbs.

=== Medical services ===
The emergency department of Christchurch Hospital treated 231 patients within one hour of the earthquake. The department responded to the situation by activating their crisis plan, forming 20 trauma teams. After a downturn in demand, a second wave of patients started arriving, many with much more severe injuries. Staff were grateful that they did not have to employ triage, but were able to deal with all patients.

A field hospital providing 75 beds was set up in the badly affected eastern suburbs on 24 February. It was equipped to provide triage, emergency care, maternity, dental care, isolation tents for gastroenteritis, and to provide primary care since most general practices in the area were unable to open.

Australia's foreign minister Kevin Rudd told Sky News that New Zealand's Foreign Affairs Minister Murray McCully had asked for further help from Australia. He said Australia would send counsellors over and a disaster medical assistance team comprising 23 emergency and surgical personnel.

=== Humanitarian and welfare services ===
Humanitarian support and welfare were provided by various agencies, in particular the New Zealand Red Cross and The Salvation Army. Welfare Centres and support networks were established throughout the city. Some government departments and church groups provided grants and assistance. Some residents went several days without official contact, so neighbours were encouraged to attend to those around them. Official visitation teams were organised by Civil Defence and there were engineers or assessors from EQC. The primarily wilderness all-volunteer search and rescue organisation, LandSAR, deployed 530 people to the city to perform welfare checks. Over the course of a week, LandSAR teams visited 67,000 premises.

=== Infrastructure and services ===
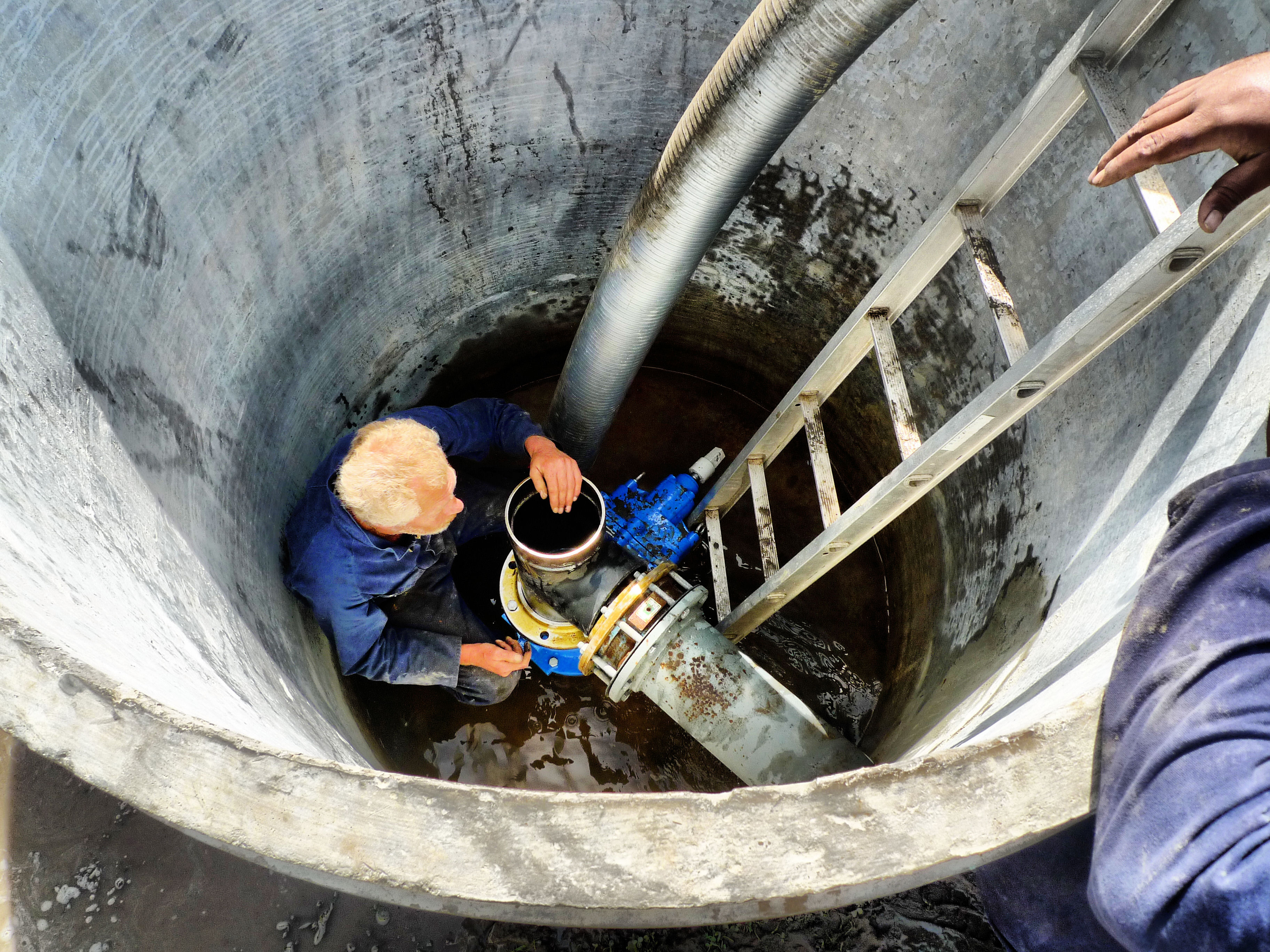
Workers trying to restore water service

The 66 kV subtransmission cables supplying Dallington and New Brighton zone substations from Transpower's Bromley substation were damaged beyond repair, which necessitated the erection of temporary 66 kV overhead lines from Bromley to Dallington and Bromley to New Brighton to get power into the eastern suburbs. Power had been restored to 82% of households within five days, and to 95% within two weeks. Electricity distribution operator Orion later stated the power outages caused by the earthquake added to 3261 SAIDI minutes, or equivalent to the entire city being without power for 54 hours and 21 minutes.

== Response ==
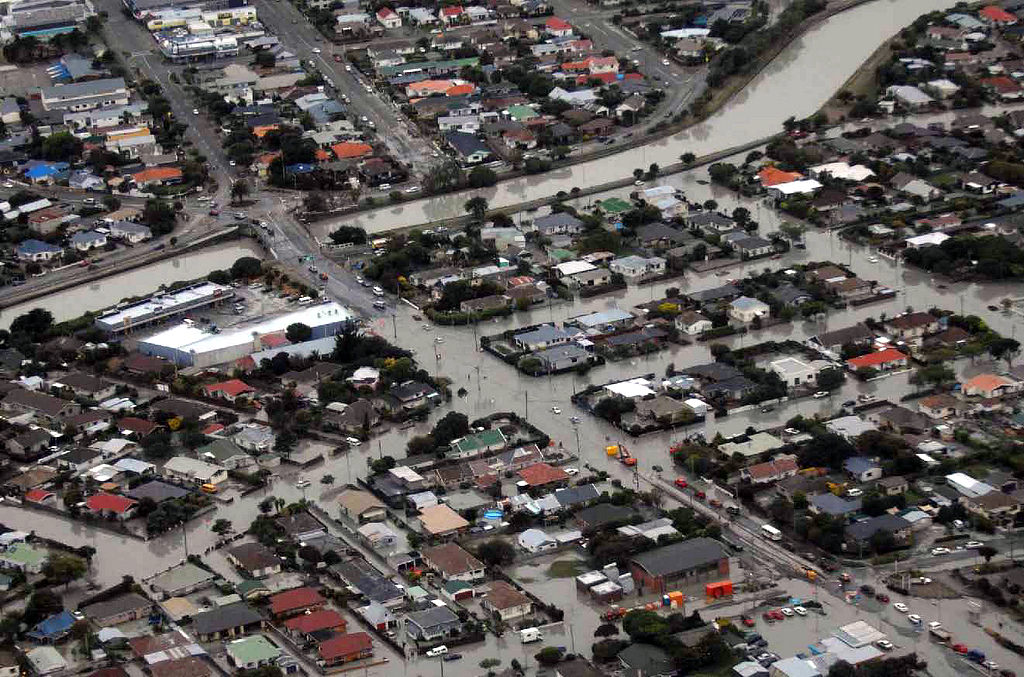
RNZAF aerial survey of damage, showing flooding due to soil liquefaction in Christchurch

On the day of the earthquake, Prime Minister John Key said that 22 February, "...may well be New Zealand's darkest day", and Mayor of Christchurch Bob Parker warned that New Zealanders are "going to be presented with statistics that are going to be bleak".

Generators were donated, and telephone companies established emergency communications and free calls. The army provided desalination plants, and bottled supplies were sent in by volunteers and companies. With limited water supplies for firefighting, a total fire ban was introduced, and the fire service brought in water tankers from other centres. Mains water supply was re-established to 70% of households within one week. Waste water and sewerage systems were severely damaged. Thousands of portaloos and chemical toilets from throughout New Zealand and overseas were brought into the city. Community laundries were set up in affected suburbs. Portable shower units were also established in the eastern suburbs.

Thousands of people helped with the clean-up efforts—involving the removal of over 200,000 tonnes of liquefaction silt—including Canterbury University's Student Volunteer Army which was created in response to the earthquake that September and the Federated Farmers' "Farmy Army". The "Rangiora Earthquake Express" provided over 250 tonnes of water, medical supplies, and food, including hot meals, from nearby Rangiora by helicopter and truck.

=== International offers of support ===
"I know that [Australians'] thoughts are with the people of New Zealand as they grapple with this enormous tragedy in Christchurch. ... We will be doing everything we can to work with our New Zealand family, with Prime Minister Key and his emergency services personnel, his military officers, his medical people, his search and rescue teams. We will be working alongside them to give as much relief and assistance to New Zealand as we possibly can."

— Australian Prime Minister Julia Gillard on the earthquake.

Australian Prime Minister Julia Gillard offered Australia's assistance. The Australian Government also pledged A$5 million (NZ$6.7 million) to the Red Cross Appeal. On 1 March, it was announced that the New South Wales Government would be donating A$1 million (NZ$1.3 million) to the victims of the Christchurch earthquake.

The UN and the European Union offered assistance. Kamalesh Sharma, Commonwealth Secretary-General, sent a message of support to the Prime Minister and stated "our heart and condolences go immediately to the bereaved." He added that the thoughts and prayers of the Commonwealth were with the citizens of New Zealand, and Christchurch especially.

Sixty-six Japanese USAR members and three specialist search and rescue dogs arrived in Christchurch within two days of the February earthquake. They started work immediately in a multi-agency response to the collapse of the CTV Building on Madras Street. Many of the people trapped in that building were Japanese and other foreign English language students.

Canadian Prime Minister Stephen Harper released a statement saying: "The thoughts and prayers of Canadians are with all those affected by the earthquake. Canada is standing by to offer any possible assistance to New Zealand in responding to this natural disaster."

David Cameron, Prime Minister of the United Kingdom, issued a statement and sent SMS text messages to Commonwealth prime ministers. In his formal statement, he commented that the loss of life was "dreadful" and the "thoughts and prayers of the British people were with them".

Ban Ki-moon, Secretary-General of the United Nations, issued a statement on behalf of the UN expressing his "deep sadness" and stressed the "readiness of the United Nations to contribute to its efforts in any way needed".

China gave US$500,000 to the earthquake appeal, and Chinese Premier Wen Jiabao expressed his deep condolences to New Zealand. Twenty Chinese students were reported missing following the quake.

=== Other messages of support ===
The Queen of New Zealand said she was "utterly shocked" and her "thoughts were with all those affected". Her son and heir to the New Zealand throne, The Prince of Wales, also said to New Zealand's governor-general and prime minister: "My wife and I were horrified when we heard the news early this morning... The scale of the destruction all but defies belief when we can appreciate only too well how difficult it must have been struggling to come to terms with last year's horror ... Our deepest sympathy and constant thoughts are with you and all New Zealanders."

Barack Obama, President of the United States, issued a statement from the White House Press Office on the disaster by way of an official announcement that "On behalf of the American people, Michelle and I extend our deepest condolences to the people of New Zealand and to the families and friends of the victims in Christchurch, which has suffered its second major earthquake in just six months... As our New Zealand friends move forward, may they find some comfort and strength in knowing that they will have the enduring friendship and support of many partners around the world, including the United States." The President also made a call to Prime Minister Key.

Pope Benedict XVI issued an announcement on the earthquake in a statement during his Wednesday audience on 23 February, stating that he was praying for the dead and the injured victims of the devastating earthquake, and encouraging those involved in the rescue efforts.

A condolence book was set up in Parliament House, which was signed by both the public and the Diplomatic corps. The council of Christchurch, Dorset, in England, which is a twin town with New Zealand's Christchurch, created four condolence books. In the High Commission of New Zealand in London, Prince Charles, Prince Philip, Prince William and his fiancée Catherine Middleton, as well as Prince Harry signed the condolence book. Fiji Prime Minister Frank Bainimarama signed the condolence book in the high commission in Fiji.

=== Fundraising and charity events ===
Various sporting events were set up to raise money, such as the "Fill the Basin" cricket match at the Basin Reserve, featuring ex-New Zealand internationals, All Blacks and actors from The Hobbit, which raised more than $500,000. New Zealand cricket team captain Daniel Vettori put his personal memorabilia up for auction. All Black Sonny Bill Williams and Sky Television both made large donations from Williams' fourth boxing bout which was dubbed "The Clash For Canterbury".

Several charity concerts were held both in New Zealand and overseas including a previously unscheduled visit to New Zealand by American rock group Foo Fighters, who performed a Christchurch benefit concert in Auckland on 22 March 2011 and raised more than $350,000 for the earthquake relief fund. Local jazz flautist Miho Wada formed the ensemble Miho's Jazz Orchestra to raise money for recovery efforts.

=== Memorial services and commemorative events ===
A national memorial service was held on 18 March at North Hagley Park, coinciding with a one-off provincial holiday for Canterbury, which required the passing of the Canterbury Earthquake Commemoration Day Act 2011 to legislate. Prince William made a two-day trip to the country to tour the areas affected by the earthquake and attended on the Queen's behalf and made an address during the service. New Zealand's governor-general, Sir Anand Satyanand, attended, along with John Key, Bob Parker, and a number of local and international dignitaries. Australia's official delegation included Governor-General Quentin Bryce, Prime Minister Julia Gillard, and Opposition Leader Tony Abbott.

A two-minute silence was nationally held exactly a week after the earthquake on 1 March at 12:51 pm. Church bells were struck throughout the country to signify the beginning and the end of the silence.

A second memorial service was held at the Canterbury Earthquake National Memorial on 22 February 2021 to mark ten years since the earthquake and was attended by Christchurch Mayor Lianne Dalziel, Governor-General Dame Patsy Reddy and Prime Minister Jacinda Ardern. A minute's silence was held at 12:51 pm, and the names of all the victims were read aloud by Christchurch residents and first responders, before a wreath laying ceremony at the memorial.

The River of Flowers ceremony, in which members of the public drop flowers into the Avon River / Ōtākaro in memory of those who died during the earthquake, was inaugurated on the first anniversary of the event (22 February 2012) and remains an annual commemorative ritual.

== Commission of Inquiry ==
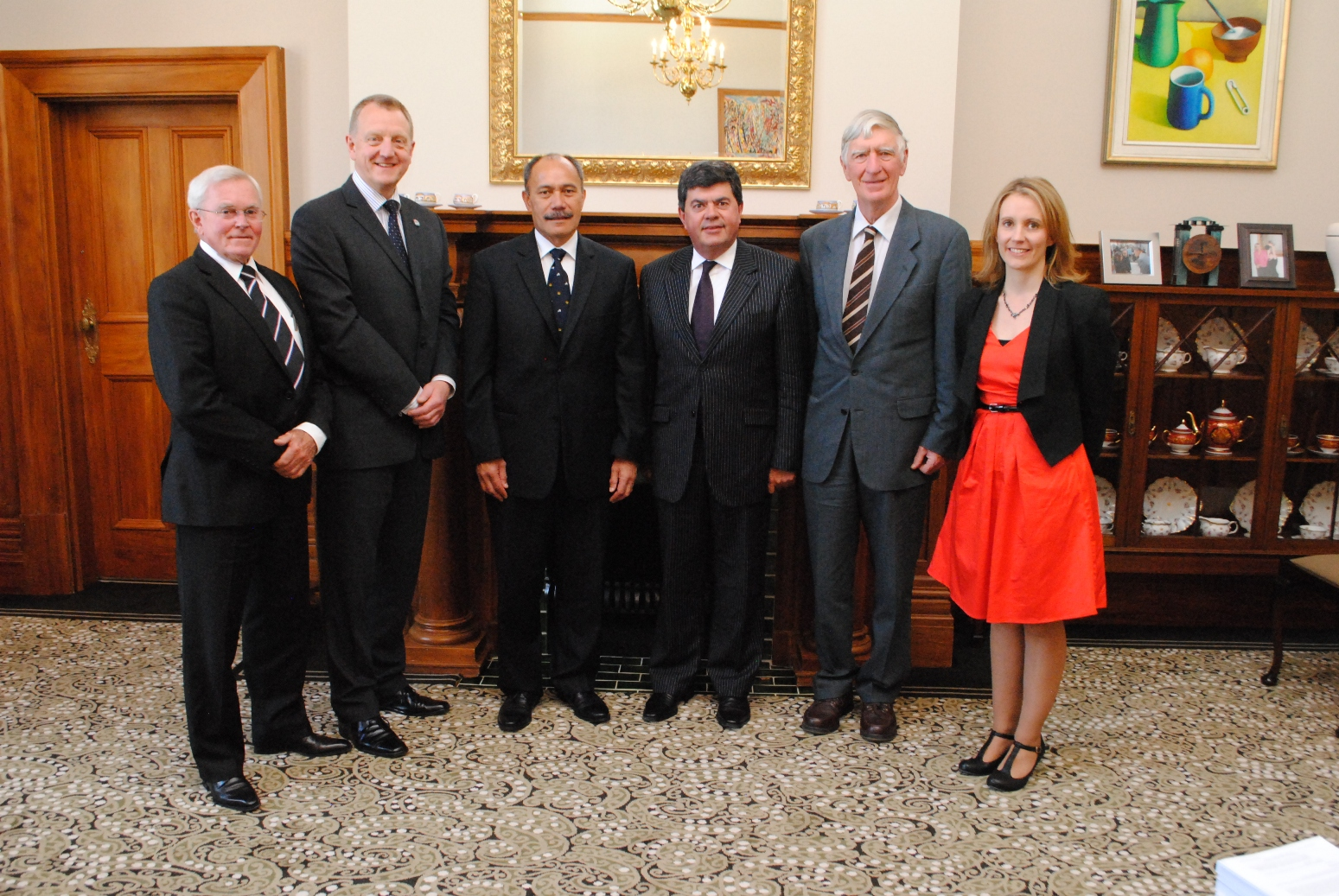
Handover of the final report of the Canterbury Earthquakes Royal Commission, at Government House, Wellington, on 29 November 2012. Left to right: Sir Ron Carter; Colin McDonald (secretary and chief executive of the Department of Internal Affairs); the governor-general, Sir Jerry Mateparae; Mark Cooper; Richard Fenwick; and Justine Gilliland (executive director of the Royal Commission).

In March 2011 the government established The Canterbury Earthquakes Royal Commission to report on the causes of building failure as a result of the earthquakes as well as the adequacy of building codes and other standards for buildings in New Zealand Central Business Districts. The Commission examined issues with specific reference to the Canterbury Television (CTV), Pyne Gould Corporation (PGC), Forsyth Barr and Hotel Grand Chancellor buildings. It excluded the investigation of any questions of liability, the earthquake search and rescue effort, and the rebuilding of the city.

The commission was chaired by High Court judge Justice Mark Cooper with support from two other commissioners: engineers Sir Ron Carter and Professor Richard Fenwick. They took into account a technical investigation undertaken by the Department of Building and Housing.

The inquiry began in April 2011 and was completed in November 2012. The Royal Commission made a total of 189 recommendations and found that the Canterbury Television building should not have been granted a building permit by the Christchurch City Council.

== Recovery ==
=== Canterbury Earthquake Recovery Authority ===
On 29 March 2011, Prime Minister John Key and Christchurch Mayor Bob Parker announced the creation of the Canterbury Earthquake Recovery Authority (CERA) to manage the earthquake recovery, co-operating with the government, local councils and residents, under chief executive John Ombler.

=== Port Hills Geotechnical Group ===
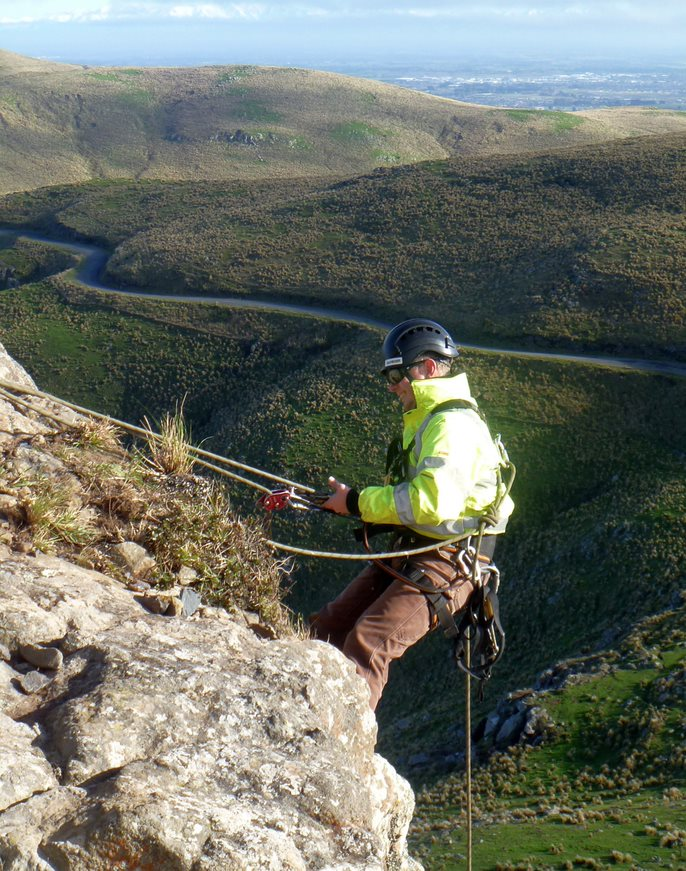
PHGG Engineering Geologist using rope access techniques during rockfall mitigation works

The Port Hills Geotechnical Group (PHGG) was established in Christchurch, as part of the response and recovery to the February 2011 earthquake. It was formed from several local and international engineering consultancies. The group consisted of specialist slope stability experts, engineering geologists and geotechnical engineers from Aurecon, Geotech Consulting, GHD Group, Opus and URS Corporation, and it was supported by the University of Canterbury and GNS Science. The group's initial function was to manage the response to geotechnical issues caused by the earthquakes in the Port Hills, including the southern suburbs of Christchurch, as well as Lyttelton, Te Rāpaki-o-Te Rakiwhakaputa, Governors Bay and other settlements around Lyttelton Harbour and Banks Peninsula.

PHGG was subsequently contracted by Christchurch City Council and Canterbury Earthquake Recovery Authority to map and define the locations of mass movement hazards, such as rockfall and landslide, and to collate geospatial information for use in the rezoning of the city. This information was subsequently used by PHGG in the assessment and mitigation of risks from these types of hazard, where they affected roads, property and infrastructure throughout the region. The information continues to be used in regional and local geotechnical risk assessments.

=== Housing ===
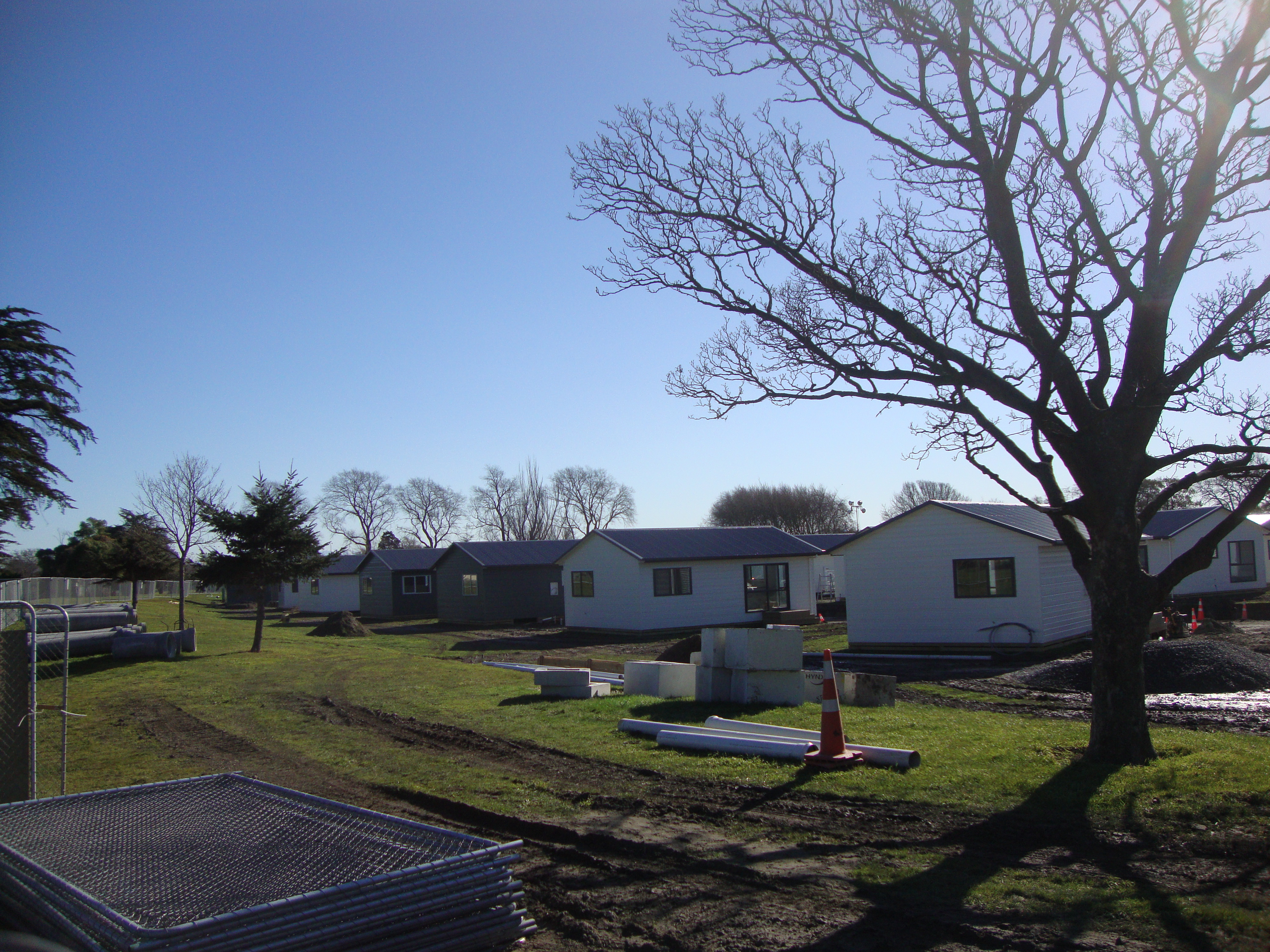
Temporary housing in Linwood Park

With an estimated 10,000 houses requiring demolition and over 100,000 damaged, plans were developed for moderate-term temporary housing. Approximately 450 fully serviced mobile homes would be located on sites across the city including Canterbury Agricultural Park and Riccarton Racecourse. The Department of Building and Housing also released a plan for the construction of 500 modular homes. While emergency repairs were performed on damaged houses by Fletcher Construction, rebuilding would be delayed by the need for full land assessments, with the possibility that some of the worst-affected areas in the eastern suburbs might need to be abandoned due to land depression and severe liquefaction, with the residents offered relocation to new subdivisions under their EQC insurance policies.

=== Schools and universities ===
On the day of the earthquake, the main secondary school teachers' union, the Post Primary Teachers Association, had arranged a paid union meeting to be held that afternoon for members in the Christchurch area. This meant most secondary schools in the city had closed early that day and most students had returned home before the earthquake hit, coincidentally limiting potential casualties.

The University of Canterbury partially reopened on 14 March 2011, with many lectures held in tents and marquees while work was carried out on university buildings. All courses expected to resume by 28 March, with plans for the April break to be shortened by two weeks to make up for lost time. The UC CEISMIC Canterbury Earthquakes Digital Archive programme was established in 2011 by University of Canterbury Professor Paul Millar. It is a project of the Digital Humanities department, with the aim of preserving the knowledge, memories and earthquake experiences of people of the Canterbury Region.

163 primary and secondary schools were affected by the earthquake, most of which were closed for three weeks; 90 had full structural clearance and were able to reopen, 24 had reports indicating further assessment and 11 were seriously damaged. Site-sharing plans were made to enable affected schools to relocate, while 9 "learning hubs" were established throughout the city to provide resources and support for students needing to work from home. Some students relocated to other centres – by 5 March, a total of 4879 Christchurch students had enrolled in other schools across New Zealand. Wānaka Primary School alone had received 115 new enrolments as Christchurch families moved to their holiday homes in the town.

Due to the extensive damage of a number of secondary schools, many were forced to share with others, allowing one school to use the ground in the morning and the other in the afternoon. This included Shirley Boys' High School sharing with Papanui High School, Linwood College sharing with Cashmere High School and Avonside Girls High School sharing with Burnside High School and Marian College sharing with St Bedes College and Unlimited Paenga Tawhiti sharing with Halswell Residential College. Linwood College and Shirley Boys' High School moved back to their original sites on 1 August (the first day of Term 3), and 13 September 2011 respectively. Avonside Girls' High School returned to its original site at the start of 2012. Marian College did not return to the original site in Shirley but instead moved to a site at Cathedral College on Barbadoes Street. Unlimited Paenga Tawhiti could not return to its central city buildings due to demolitions and it has no long term site.

In September 2012, Minister of Education Hekia Parata announced plans to permanently close and/or merge a number of schools due to falling roll numbers and quake damage. The proposals were heavily criticised for relying on incorrect information, leading one school, Phillipstown Primary, to seek a judicial review over its proposed merger with Woolston Primary. The court subsequently ruled in favour of Phillipstown and overturned the merger. The plans were confirmed in February 2013, with seven schools closing, 10 schools merging into five (not including the overturned Phillipstown-Woolston merger), and three high schools taking on additional year levels.

== Other results ==
=== Disruptions to sport ===
Christchurch was set to host five pool matches and two quarter finals of the 2011 Rugby World Cup. The International Rugby Board and the New Zealand Rugby World Cup organisers announced in March 2011 that the city would be unable to host the World Cup matches. The quarter final matches were moved to Auckland.

New Zealand Cricket's offices were damaged by the earthquake. Some matches needed to be rescheduled. The Super Rugby Round 2 match between the Crusaders and Hurricanes scheduled for 26 February 2011 at Westpac Stadium in Wellington was abandoned. The Crusaders' first two home matches of the season, originally to be played in Christchurch, were moved to Trafalgar Park in Nelson. The Crusaders played their entire home schedule away from Christchurch. In the ANZ Netball Championship, the earthquake caused significant damage to the Canterbury Tactix's main home venue, CBS Canterbury Arena, and the franchise's head office at Queen Elizabeth II Park. The team's round three match against the Northern Mystics in Auckland was postponed, while their round four home match against the Waikato Bay of Plenty Magic was moved to the Energy Events Centre in Rotorua. AMI Stadium was going to host the rugby league ANZAC Test, however, on 4 March it was announced the match would be moved to Skilled Park on the Gold Coast. The Canterbury Rugby League cancelled their pre-season competition. The 2011 Inter Dominion harness racing series was scheduled to be held at Addington Raceway in March and April however the series was instead contested in Auckland. The public grandstand at Addington was later demolished due to damage from the earthquake and aftershocks.

=== Postponement of census ===
The chief executive of Statistics New Zealand, Geoff Bascand, announced on 25 February that the national census planned for 8 March 2011 would not take place due to the disruption and displacement of people in the Canterbury Region, and the loss of Statistics New Zealand's Christchurch building where census information was to be processed. The cancellation required an amendment to the Statistics Act 1975, which legally requires a census to be taken every five years. The Governor-General also had to revoke his previous proclamation of the date of the census. It is the third time the census has been cancelled in New Zealand; the other occasions occurred in 1931, due to the Great Depression, and in 1941 due to World War II. Much of the NZ$90 million cost of the 2011 census was written off. The census was ultimately deferred to 5 March 2013.

=== Population loss ===
In the year to June 2011, the population of Christchurch had fallen by 8,900 people or 2.4% of its population, with a historic annual population growth of 1%. It is estimated that 10,600 people moved away from Christchurch, with the 1,700 people difference to the population loss explained through some people moving to Christchurch. It took until 2017 for the population loss to be recovered in Christchurch, and until 2022 for the central city.

In October 2008, the population of the Christchurch main urban area, as defined by Statistics New Zealand, had for the first time exceeded the Wellington equivalent (at 386,100 versus 386,000), which made Christchurch the second largest city in New Zealand (after Auckland). The population loss caused by the earthquake reversed this, with the Wellington main urban area back in second position. Statistics New Zealand's main urban area definition for Christchurch includes Kaiapoi, which belongs to Waimakariri District, and Prebbleton, which belongs to Selwyn District. Porirua, Upper Hutt, and Lower Hutt, all outside of the Wellington City Council area, are included in the Wellington main urban area definition. Looking at territorial areas only, i.e. not including outlying urban areas from other districts, Christchurch continues to have a significantly larger population than Wellington.

=== Economic consequences ===
In April 2013 the Government estimated the total cost of the rebuild would be as much as $40 billion, up from an earlier estimate of $30 billion. Some economists have estimated it will take the New Zealand economy 50 to 100 years to completely recover.

Finance Minister Bill English advised that the effects of the 2011 quake were likely to be more costly than the September 2010 quake. His advice was that the 2011 earthquake was a "new event" and that EQC's reinsurance cover was already in place after the previous 2010 event. New Zealand's Earthquake Commission (EQC), a government organisation, levies policyholders to cover a major part of the earthquake risk. The EQC further limits its own risk by taking out cover with a number of large reinsurance companies, for example Munich Re.

The EQC pays out the first NZ$1.5 billion in claims, and the reinsurance companies are liable for all amounts between NZ$1.5 billion and NZ$4 billion. The EQC again covers all amounts above NZ$4 billion. EQC chief executive Ian Simpson said that the $4 billion cap for each earthquake is unlikely to be exceeded by the costs of residential building and land repairs, so $3 billion would be left in the EQC's Natural Disaster Fund after payouts.

Claims from the 2010 shock were estimated at NZ$2.75–3.5 billion. Prior to the 2010 quake, the EQC had a fund of NZ$5.93 billion according to the EQC 2010 Annual Report, with NZ$4.43 billion left prior to the 2011 quake, after taking off the NZ$1.5 billion cost.

EQC cover for domestic premises entitles the holder to up to NZ$100,000 plus tax (GST) for each dwelling, with any further amount above that being paid by the policyholder's insurance company. For personal effects, EQC pays out the first NZ$20,000 plus tax. It also covers land damage within 8 metres of a home; this coverage is uncapped.

Commercial properties are not insured by the EQC, but by private insurance companies. These insurers underwrite their commercial losses to reinsurers, who will again bear the brunt of these claims. JPMorgan Chase & Co say the total overall losses related to this earthquake may be US$12 billion. That would make it the third most costly earthquake event in history, after the 2011 Japan and 1994 California earthquakes.

Earthquake Recovery Minister Gerry Brownlee echoed that fewer claims were expected through the EQC than for 2010. In the 2010 earthquake, 180,000 claims were processed as opposed to the expected 130,000 claims for the 2011 aftershock. The total number of claims for the two events was expected to be 250,000, as Brownlee explained that many of the claims were "overlapping".

The Accident Compensation Corporation (ACC) announced it would be the largest single event they had paid out for, with an estimated 7,500 injury claims costing over $200 million.

On 2 March 2011, John Key said he expected an interest rate cut to deal with the earthquake. The reaction to the statement sent the New Zealand dollar down.

In January 2013 Earthquake Recovery Minister Gerry Brownlee said repairs to damaged homes to date had totalled more than $1 billion.

A KPMG survey in March 2013 suggested as much as $1.5 billion could be sucked from the rebuild in fraud.

=== Mental health ===
The 2011 earthquake had mental health effects on the population. Research following the Christchurch earthquakes has shown that increasing exposure to the damage and trauma of a natural disaster is correlated with an increase in depression, anxiety, and post-traumatic stress disorder (PTSD). In addition, in the year after the 2011 earthquake there was a significant increase in cardiovascular disease and heart attacks amongst those whose houses were most damaged. This information is important to consider when reacting to future earthquakes and other natural disasters. There is evidence that suggests that the mental health effects of natural disasters can be debilitating and detrimental to the community affected.

Evidence from research on the Christchurch earthquakes reveals that increased trauma exposure is not exclusively correlated with negative outcomes. Those with relatively high exposure to earthquake damage show an increase in positive effects, including an increase in personal strength, growth in social relationships, the bringing of families closer, and realising what is important in life. It is thought that natural disasters, such as earthquakes, are able to induce these positive effects because they affect an entire community, in comparison to an event that targets only an individual. The damage on a community can lead members to engage in pro-social behaviours.

Those that exhibit lower mental health prior to an earthquake will be more likely to experience negative life changes than positive life changes with regard to personal strength. Depressive symptoms before a disaster can predict higher chances of developing PTSD following a trauma. People who exhibit lower mental health prior to the trauma do not adapt as well following trauma, and show higher levels of PTSD. Personality traits, such as neuroticism and low self-control are associated with a lower sense of normality following an earthquake, however optimism is predictive of lower and less severe PTSD symptoms.

Studying earthquakes has shown to be a difficult task when considering all the limitations created by natural disasters. Clinical interviews are difficult because of the widespread damage to infrastructure and roads, which leads to reliance on self-report. Self-report can introduce bias to results, leading to skewed data. Researchers are unable to reliably compare an individual's mental health status to their health status previous to the trauma because they must rely on retrospective self-report. Retrospective self-report is affected greatly by the individual's current state of distress. The displacement of large numbers of citizens following a trauma poses as a problem for researchers of natural disasters. It is predicted that the people who are displaced experience the worst of the damage, and therefore the reported levels of PTSD and depression are often lower than they would have been had the displaced citizens been available to collect data from. Because large number of citizens are being displaced, it is difficult to find a representative sample population. For example, after the Christchurch earthquakes, studies reported that older educated females of European New Zealand descent were over represented in their sample population.

Researching the mental health effects of earthquakes and other disasters is important so communities can heal properly after experiencing a traumatic event. This is a difficult topic to research because fixing the physical damage from a disaster is usually the first step a city takes towards recovery. Each individual can react differently to traumatic events, and more research needs to be done to learn how to predict vulnerability and access the effects to find solutions that work best. Because it has been found that different demographics are affected differently.

In March 2013 a researcher at the University of Canterbury said after the quake, residents – particularly women – turned to comfort food and began eating unhealthily.

== Screen portrayals ==
- When A City Falls (2011): feature-length documentary about the 2010 and 2011 quakes in Christchurch directed & produced by Gerard Smyth and released in cinemas in November 2011.
- Hope and Wire (2014): 3-part television mini-series dramatising the 2011 Christchurch quake. Screened on TV3 in July 2014.
- Sunday (2014): feature film set in Christchurch one year after the 2011 quake, depicting a young couple living amongst the re-building of the city.
- Tinā (2024): drama film about a teacher whose daughter died in the earthquake.

== See also ==
- 1931 Hawke's Bay earthquake – New Zealand's deadliest natural disaster
- 2016 Christchurch earthquake
- Christchurch Central Recovery Plan – Plan for rebuilding Christchurch after the 2011 earthquake
- December 2010 Christchurch earthquake
- Geology of the Canterbury Region
- List of disasters in New Zealand by death toll
- List of earthquakes in 2011
- List of earthquakes in New Zealand
