= Richard Fenwick (engineer) =

New Zealand engineer and academic

ONZM Richard Collingwood Fenwick
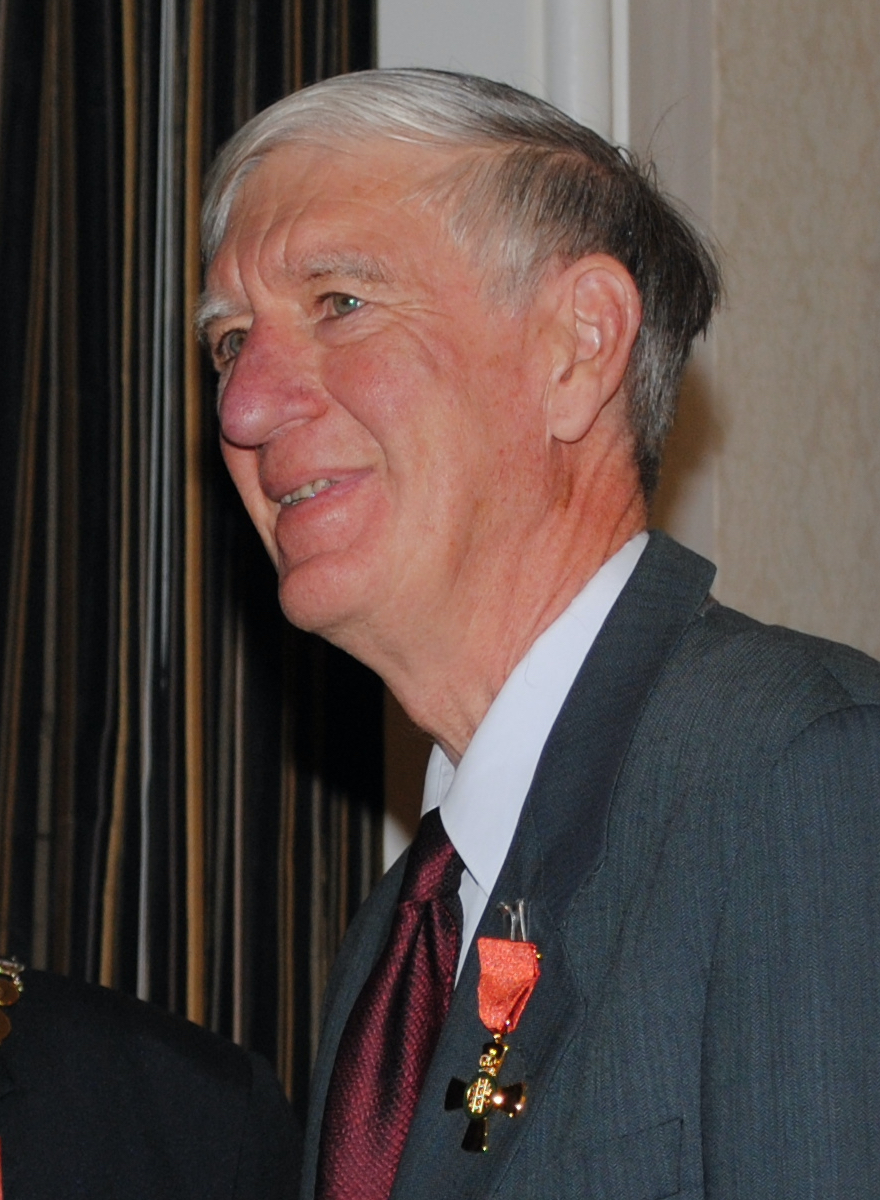
- Fenwick in 2010
- Citizenship: New Zealand
- Awards: NZSEE Otto Glogau Award (1990, 2011); IPENZ Freyssinet Award (1991, 1994); Standards NZ Meritorious Service Award (2005); Standards Council Award for Outstanding Contribution (2013); William Pickering Award for Engineering Leadership (2013)
- Honours: Distinguished Fellow of the Institution of Professional Engineers New Zealand (2015)

Richard Collingwood Fenwick ONZM is a New Zealand engineer and academic, known for his work on structural design and seismic performance. Formerly a practicing structural engineer, Fenwick has had a career as an educator and researcher for over 50 years, and was involved in the writing of modern NZ Structural Design Standards. He is an Adjunct Professor of Civil Engineering at the University of Canterbury, and was formerly a lecturer and researcher at the University of Auckland. In 2010, he was appointed an Officer of the New Zealand Order of Merit for services to engineering. In 2015, he became a Distinguished Fellow of IPENZ.

Fenwick is a long-standing member of the New Zealand Society for Earthquake Engineering (NZSEE) and an Honorary Life Member of the New Zealand Concrete Society, and was one of three commissioners on the Canterbury Earthquakes Royal Commission for his expertise in concrete and seismic design. His work on the commission saw him receive the William Pickering Award for Engineering Leadership and the NZSEE President's Award.

Fenwick has been involved in research and published work in journals since the late 1970s. Fenwick has received multiple awards for his published work, including the NZSEE Otto Glogau Award in 1990 and 2011, and the IPENZ Freyssinet Award in 1991 and 1994. In the 1980s through to the 2000s, he was involved in committees and study groups such as the SANZ Loading Code Revision Committee (1987–1992) and a precast concrete study group by the NZ Concrete Society (1997–1999). In the 1990s, he published 10 technical papers and contributed to the revision of NZ Structural Design Standards, a process he would undertake again in the 2000s. Standards NZ awarded him the Meritorious Service Award in 2005 for his work, and the Standards Council Award in 2013 for outstanding contribution to structural engineering standards.

From 1975 until 2002, Fenwick was based at the University of Auckland as a lecturer and researcher. Since 2002, Fenwick has been an adjunct professor at the University of Canterbury; he is retired as a practicing engineer, but continues to contribute to the field academically and through voluntary committee work for Standards New Zealand.

== Career ==
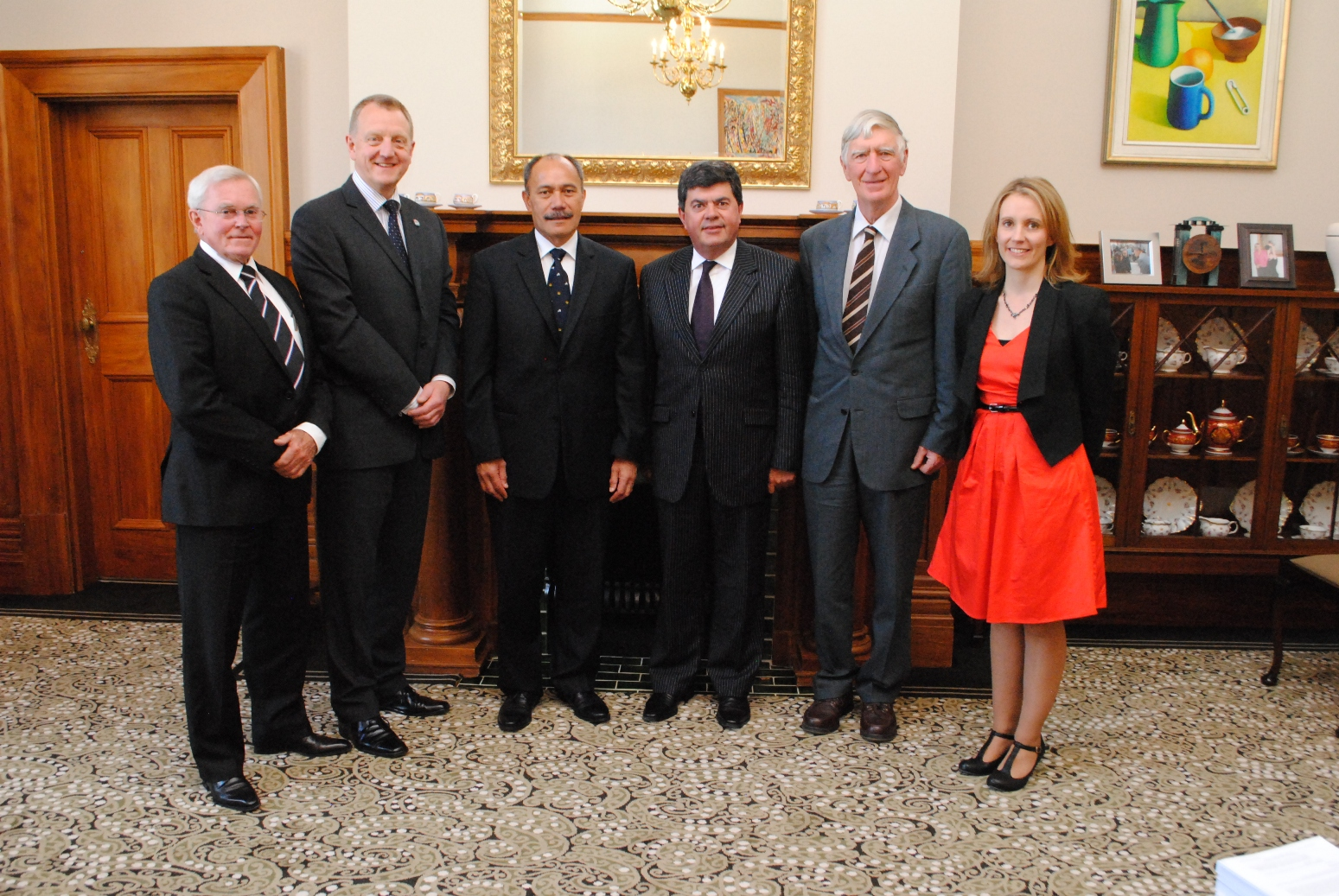
Fenwick (second from right) in 2012 during the Canterbury Earthquake Royal Commission report handover

Fenwick holds a Bachelor of Engineering and a PhD. In 1975, Fenwick joined the University of Auckland, researching and lecturing in structural design. He held the role until April 2002 when he retired. In June, he became an adjunct professor for the Faculty of Engineering at the University of Canterbury, where he specialises in civil and natural resources engineering. For part of his career, Fenwick was a practicing structural engineering in New Zealand, as well as the UK and US. He continued to contribute to his field academically and through voluntary committee work for Standards New Zealand.

Fenwick has been a member of various study groups and committees. He was a member of the SANZ Loading Code Revision Committee from 1987 to 1992, and a precast concrete study group by the NZ Concrete Society and NZSEE from 1988 to 1991 and 1997–1999, among others. He contributed to the NZ Structural Design Standards, notably the Loadings Standard (NZS4203:1992), and the updated version, Loadings Standard for Earthquake Actions (NZS1170.5:2004), as well as being on the committee for the revision of the Structural Concrete Standard (NZS3101).

Fenwick co-authored numerous papers throughout the 1990s, including 10 technical papers published in the NZSEE Bulletin. He also presented 14 papers at the numerous international conferences in connection with NZSEE.

Following the 2011 Christchurch Earthquake, Fenwick became one of three commissioners on the Canterbury Earthquakes Royal Commission for his expertise in concrete and seismic design.

== Awards and honours ==
In 1990, Fenwick was awarded the Otto Glogau Award by the NZSEE. In 1991 and 1994, Fenwick won the IPENZ Freyssinet Award. In 2002, Fenwick received the award of Life Membership from the NZSEE. In 2011, Fenwick and Rajesh Dhakal jointly won the Otto Glogau Award for their 2008 paper on plastic hinges in the seismic design of concrete structures.

In 2005, Fenwick received the Meritorious Service Award by Standards NZ for his contribution to structural design standardisation. In 2013, he was further acknowledged for his contributions, receiving the Standards Council Award for outstanding contribution to structural engineering standards In 2008, Fenwick was made an Honorary Life Member of the New Zealand Concrete Society.

In 2010, Fenwick was appointed an Officer of the New Zealand Order of Merit for services to engineering in the Queen's Birthday Honours.

Following his work on the Canterbury Earthquake Commission, Fenwick received the William Pickering Award for Engineering Leadership in 2013 and the New Zealand Society for Earthquake Engineering's President's Award.

On 13 March 2015, Fenwick was honoured as a Distinguished Fellow of the Institution of Professional Engineers New Zealand, for his contributions to engineering and education over 40 years. Only 68 people had received it at the time. He was award the honour at the IPENZ Awards Dinner at Te Papa museum in Wellington.

== Selected works ==
- Fenwick, R. C., & Paulay, T. (1968). Mechanisms of Shear Resistance of Concrete Beams. Journal of the Structural Division, 94(10), 2325–2350.
- Regan, P. E., Fenwick, R. C., & Bhal, N. S. (1970). Discussion: Shear in reinforced concrete beams. Magazine of Concrete Research, 22(70), 51–55.
- Fenwick, R. C., & Fong, A. (1979). The behaviour of reinforced concrete beams under cyclic loading. Bulletin of the New Zealand Society for Earthquake Engineering, 12(2), 158–167.
- Fenwick, R. C., Davidson, B. J., & Chung, B. T. (1992). P-delta actions in seismic resistant structures. Bulletin of the New Zealand Society for Earthquake Engineering, 25(1), 56–69.
- Fenwick, R. C., & L.M. Megget. (1993). Elongation and load deflection characteristics of reinforced concrete members containing plastic hinges. Bulletin of the New Zealand National Society for Earthquake Engineering, 26(1), 28–41.
- Brian, Fenwick, R. C., Rajesh Dhakal, & Carr, A. J. (2009). Seismic Performance of Reinforced Concrete Frames with Precast-Prestressed Flooring System. Structures Congress 2009.
- Dhakal, R. P., Brian, Fenwick, R. C., Carr, A. J., & Bull, D. K. (2014). Cyclic Loading Test of Reinforced Concrete Frame with Precast-Prestressed Flooring System. ACI Structural Journal, 111(4).
