= List of fault zones =

This list covers all faults and fault-systems that are either geologically important or connected to prominent seismic activity. It is not intended to list every notable fault, but only major fault zones.

Fault name	Length [km]	Location	Sense of movement	Time of movement	Associated earthquakes	Sources
Aedipsos-Kandili Fault	60	North Euboean Gulf, Greece	Normal	Active		
Alaska–Aleutian megathrust	4000	Kamchatka, Russia to Gulf of Alaska	Subduction zone	Active	1964 Prince William Sound (M9.2), 1965 Rat Islands (M8.7), 1957 Andreanof Islands (M8.6)	
Alpine Fault	600	South Island, New Zealand	Dextral strike-slip (transform)	Active	Last earthquake ca. 1717 (~M8)	
Altyn Tagh Fault	2000	Tibetan Plateau/Tarim Basin	Sinistral strike-slip	Active		
Amfilochia Fault	60	Western Greece	Sinistral strike-slip	Active		
Amorgos Fault	>100	Greece, South Aegean Sea	Normal	Active	1956 Amorgos (M7.4)	
Arkitsa–Agios Konstantinos fault zone	25	Central Greece	Normal			
Aspy Fault	40	Nova Scotia, Canada	Strike-slip			
Atacama Fault	800	Atacama Desert, Chile	Strike-slip	Active		
Atalanti Fault	50	Central Greece	Normal	Active	1894 Atalanti (M6.4, M6.9)	
Atotsugawa Fault		Japan	Dextral strike-slip	Active	1858 Hietsu earthquake (M~7)	
Awatere Fault	200	South Island, New Zealand	Dextral strike-slip	Active	1848 Marlborough (M7.5)	
Azores–Gibraltar transform fault	2250	Azores to Strait of Gibraltar	Dextral strike-slip	Active	1755 Lisbon earthquake (est. M7.7–9.0), 1969 Cape St. Vincent (M7.9), 1941 Gloria Fault (M8.0)	
Baikal Rift Zone		Lake Baikal	Rift zone	Active		
Balcones Fault		Texas, United States	Normal	Inactive	the subsidence of the Texas Coastal Plain during the Neogene period	
Ballenas Fault		Gulf of California, United States	Transform	Active		
Baribis Fault	100	Java, Indonesia	Thrust	Active	1834 Java earthquake (M 7.0)	
Brothers Fault Zone		Oregon, United States				
Bulnay Fault	370	Mongolia	Sinistral	Active	1905 Bolnai (M8.3)	
Calaveras Fault	120	San Francisco Bay Area, California, United States	Dextral	Active	1911 Morgan Hill (M6.5), 1984 Morgan Hill (M6.2)	
Cascadia megathrust	1000	West coast of United States – Oregon & Washington Vancouver Island, Canada	Subduction zone	Active	1700 Cascadia (M9.0)	
Central African Shear Zone	4000	Central Africa	Rift zone			
Cerro Prieto Fault		Gulf of California, United States	Transform	Active		
Chino Fault		California, United States	Dextral	Active		
Chixoy-Polochic Fault		Guatemala	Transform	Active	1816 Guatemala (M7.5)	
Christchurch Fault		South Island, New Zealand		Active		
Chile subduction megathrust	3000	West coast of Chile	Subduction zone	Active	1960 Valdivia (M9.5); 1906 Valparaiso (M8.2); 2010 Maule (M8.8); 2014 Iquique (M8.2)	
Clarence Fault	210	South Island, New Zealand	Dextral strike-slip	Active		
Clarendon-Linden fault system		New York, United States				
Clayton-Marsh Creek-Greenville Fault		California, United States				
Cochabamba Fault Zone		Bolivia	Sinistral strike-slip			
Concord Fault	18	California, United States	Dextral	Active		
Corinth Rift	110	Greece	Rift zone	Active	1995 Aigio (M6.2); 1981 Alkyonides (M6.4-6.7); 1861 Helike (M6.6-6.7); 373 BC Helike	
Craven Fault System		Pennines	Normal	Carboniferous		
Darling Fault	950-1500	Western Australia, Australia	Proterozoic			
Dead Sea Transform	~1000	Sinai Peninsula	Sinistral transform	Active	1138 Aleppo earthquake	
Delfi Fault Zone	25	Central Greece	Normal to strike-slip			
Denali Fault	>500	British Columbia, Canada to Alaska, United States	Dextral strike-slip	Active	2002 Denali (M7.9)	
East African Rift	~5,000	East Africa	Rift zone	Active		
East Anatolian Fault	~700	Turkey	Sinistral strike-slip	Active	2003 Bingöl (M6.4), 2010 Elâzığ (M6.1), 2020 Elâzığ (M6.7), 2023 Turkey (M7.8)	
Eastern Tennessee seismic zone		Alabama to Virginia, United States		Active	2003 Alabama (M4.6)	
Elsinore Fault Zone	180	California, United States	Dextral strike-slip	Active		
Eltanin Fault System		Southern Ocean	Dextral transform	Active	1600 km offset	
Enriquillo–Plantain Garden fault zone		Hispaniola	Sinistral strike-slip	Active	2010 Haiti (M7.0), 2021 Haiti (M7.2)	
European Cenozoic Rift System	1,100	France, Switzerland, Germany, Netherlands	Rift zone	Active	1992 Roermond (M5.3), 1356 Basel (M6.0-7.1)	
Flores back-arc thrust fault		Java and Banda Sea, Indonesia	Thrust	Active	July–August 2018 Lombok (M6.4-6.9)	
Garlock Fault	250	California, United States	Sinistral	Active		
Glarus thrust		Switzerland	Thrust fault	Cenozoic		
Great Glen Fault		Scotland	Strike-slip	Silurian to Cenozoic		
Great Lakes Tectonic Zone (GLTZ)	1400	Great Lakes, United States	Tectonic zone	Neoarchean		
Great Northern Puerto Rico Fault Zone (GNPRfz)	270	Puerto Rico	Strike-slip	Active	2010 Aguas Buenas (5.1)	
Great Southern Puerto Rico Fault Zone (GSPRFZ)	200	Puerto Rico	Strike-slip	Active	2019–20 Puerto Rico earthquakes	
Great Sumatran Fault	1650-1900	Sumatra, Indonesia	Strike-slip	Active	1943 Alahan Panjang (M7.2), 1994 Liwa (M7.0)	
Greendale Fault	>20	South Island, New Zealand	Dextral strike-slip	Active	2010 Canterbury (M7.1)	
Guaymas Fault	325	California, United States	Dextral strike-slip	Active		
Gulf of California Rift Zone	1300	Mexico	Rift zone	Active	2010 Mexicali (M7.2)	
Gulf of Suez Rift	>250	Egypt	Rift zone	Late Oligocene – end Miocene		
Haiyuan Fault	1000	Tibet, China	Sinistral	Active	1920, 1927	
Hayward Fault Zone	119	San Francisco Bay, California, United States	Strike-slip	Active	1868 Hayward (M6.3–6.7)	
Hellenic Arc	1000	East Mediterranean Sea	Thrust/Strike-slip		365 AD (M8.5+); 1303 AD (~8)	
Homebush Bay Fault Zone	≥20	Sydney, New South Wales, Australia	Sinistral strike-slip	Early Cretaceous		
Honey Lake Fault Zone		Nevada and California, United States	Dextral strike-slip	Active		
Hope Fault	130	South Island, New Zealand	Dextral strike-slip	Active	1888 North Canterbury (M7.3), 2016 North Canterbury Mw7.8	
Humboldt Fault Zone		Nebraska to Kansas, United States	Normal	Active	1867 Manhattan, Kansas (M5.1)	
Hurricane Fault	250	Utah to Arizona, United States	Normal		1992 Utah (M5.9)	
Imperial Fault Zone		California, United States	Dextral strike-slip	Active	1940 El Centro (M6.9), 1979 Imperial Valley (M6.4)	
Ierapetra Fault	40	Crete	Normal			
Independence Valley fault system		Nevada, United States	Normal	Active	2008 Wells earthquake (M6.0)	
Izu–Bonin–Mariana Arc subduction zone	>2800	Micronesia	Subduction zone	Active	1993 Guam (M7.8)	
Japan Trench	1400	Off the coast of Honshu	Subduction zone	Active	see Seismicity of the Sanriku coast	
Kabaw Fault	>300	Myanmar	Oblique-thrust	Active	1792 Rakhine (M8.8)	
Kameni-Kolumbo Fault zone	>60	Greece, South Aegean Sea	Dextral (?) Strike-slip			
Kandi Fault Zone		West Africa				
Karakoram Fault	1000	Tibet	Oblique-slip			
Karsdorf Fault		Germany				
Kefalonia Transform Fault	180	Greece, Ionian Sea	Dextral strike Slip	Active	1953 Kephalonia (M7.2)	
Kego Fault		Japan		Active	2005 Fukuoka (M7.0)	
Kekerengu Fault		South Island, New Zealand	Dextral	Active	2016 – See Hope Fault M7.8	
Kermadec-Tonga Subduction Zone	3000	New Zealand	Subduction zone	Active	2021 Kermadec Islands (M8.1)	
Kern Canyon Fault		Sierra Nevada, California, United States	Thrust fault			
Kunlun fault	1500	Tibet	Sinistral strike-slip	Active	2001 Kunlun (M7.8)	
Kuril–Kamchatka Trench	2900	From the Kuril Islands to the Kamchatka Peninsula	Subduction zone	Active	1952 Severo-Kurilsk (M9.0)	
Kyaukkyan Fault	500	Myanmar	Dextral	Active	1912 Shan state (M7.7)	
Laguna Salada Fault	64–80	United States and Mexico	Strike-slip	Active	2010 Mexicali (M7.2)	
Laptev Sea Rift		Arctic Ocean	Rift zone			
Lesser Antilles Subduction Zone	>900	Lesser Antilles	Subduction zone	Active	1969 Guadeloupe (M7.2), 1974 Antigua (7.5), 2007 Martinique (M7.4)	
Lewis Overthrust		Montana, United States	Thrust	Late Cretaceous to Early Paleocene		
Liquiñe-Ofqui Fault	1000	Andes, Chile	Strike-slip			
Long Point–Eureka Heights Fault System		Texas, United States	Normal			
Longmen Shan Fault		Sichuan, China	Thrust fault	Active	2008 Sichuan (M8.0)	
Lost River Fault		Idaho, United States	Normal	Active	1983 Borah Peak (M6.9)	
Lusatian Fault		Germany	Thrust fault			
Macquarie Fault Zone	>400	South Pacific Ocean	Strike-slip	Active	1989 Maquarie Isl. (8.2), 2008 Macquarie Island earthquake (M7.1)	
Mae Chan Fault	120	Thailand and Laos	Sinstral	Active	2007 Laos (M6.3)	
Magallanes–Fagnano Fault		South America	Transform			
Main Boundary Thrust	2000	Himalaya	Thrust	Active (although not uniformly)		
Main Central Thrust	2200	Himalaya	Thrust	Active (although not uniformly)	1991 Uttarkashi (M6.8)	
Main Frontal Thrust	2000	Himalaya	Thrust	Active	1505 Lo Mustang (M8.9), 1934 Bihar (M8.0)	
Main Himalayan Thrust	2000	Himalaya	Subduction zone (continental collision)	Active	1505 Lo Mustang (M8.9), 1950 Assam-Tibet (M8.6) 2015 Gorkha (M7.8), 2015 Nepal (M7.3)	
Main Uralian Fault (MUF)	2000+	Urals	Subduction zone			
Marianna Fault		Arkansas, United States				
Marikina Valley fault system		Philippines	Dextral strike-slip	Active		
Marlborough fault system		South Island, New Zealand	Dextral strike-slip	Active	1843 Wanganui (M~7.5)	
Meers Fault		Oklahoma, United States	Oblique slipe	Active	Holocene	
Medvednica Fault Zone		Zagreb, Croatia	Strike-slip	Active	1880 (M6.3), 2020 (M5.3)	
Mendocino fracture zone		California, United States	Transform	Active		
Moab Fault		Utah, United States	Normal	Active		
Mocha fracture zone		Mocha Island, Chile	Transform	Active		
Motagua Fault		Guatemala	Transform	Active	1717, 1773, 1902, 1976, 1980, 2009	
Mount Diablo Thrust	25	Contra Costa County, California, United States	Blind thrust	Active		
Mygdonia Graben		North Greece	Normal to strike-slip	Active	1978 Thessaloniki (M6.4)	
Middle America Trench	2750	West of Central America	Subduction zone	Active	1982 El Salvador (M7.3), 1992 Nicaragua (M7.7)	
Nankai Trough	900	South of Honshū, Japan	Subduction zone	Active	see Nankai megathrust earthquakes	
Neodani Fault		Japan	Oblique-slip	Active	1891 Mino–Owari (M8.0)	
New Madrid Fault Zone		Missouri, United States	Normal	Active	1811–1812 three (M7-8)	
Nootka Fault		British Columbia, Canada	Transform	Active		
North Aegean Trough	>250	North Aegean Sea, Greece, Turkey	Dextral strike-slip	Active	1912 (M7.6); 1982 (M6.7); 2014 (M6.9)	
North Anatolian Fault		Turkey	Dextral strike-slip	Active	1939 Erzincan (M7.8), 1912 Ganos (M7.4), 1999 Izmit (M7.4), 1999 Düzce (M7.2), 2022 Düzce (M6.1)	
North Ikaria Fault	>80	Central Aegean Sea, Greece	Dextral strike slip			
North Island Fault System	500	North Island, New Zealand	Dextral strike slip	Active		
Northridge Blind Thrust		San Fernando Valley, United States	Blind thrust	Active	1994 Northridge (M6.7)	
Palu-Koro Fault	500	Palu, Sigi, Donggala, Indonesia	Sinistral strike-slip	Active	2005 Bora, Sigi earthquake (M6.2), 2018 Sulawesi earthquake (M7.5)	
Periadriatic Seam	1000	Alps, Europe	Dextral strike-slip			
Pichilemu Fault	40	Chile		Active	2010 Pichilemu (Libertador O'Higgins) (M6.9)	
Piqiang Fault	>70	China	Sinistral strike-slip	Active	2024 Uqturpan earthquake	
Pliny Trench	300	Eastern Mediterranean Sea, Hellenic Trench	Sinistral strike-slip			
Port Hills Fault		South Island, New Zealand	Oblique-thrust	Active	2011 Christchurch (M6.3)	
Puente Hills Thrust	40	San Gabriel Valley, United States	Blind thrust	Active	1987 Whittier Narrows (M5.9)	
Puerto Rico Trench	1,000+	Puerto Rico, Virgin Islands	Transform	Active	1943 Puerto Rico (M7.7)	
Queen Charlotte-Fairweather Fault	800	Canada and Alaska	Dextral	Active	1949 Graham Island (M8.1), 1958 Lituya Bay (M7.8), 2012 Haida Gwaii (M7.8)	
Pyramid Lake Fault Zone		Nevada, United States	Dextral strike-slip			
Ramapo Fault	300	New York, New Jersey, Pennsylvania, United States	Normal	Triassic to Early Jurassic		
Rawat Fault		Pakistan				
Raymond Fault		California, United States				
Red River Fault	900	China, Vietnam	Dextral strike-slip	Active	1970 Tonghai (M7.1), 1925 Dali (M6.9-7.0), 2021 Dali (M6.1)	
Red Sea Rift		Red Sea	Rift zone			
Reigolil-Pirihueico Fault		Andes				
Rhine Rift Valley		Germany and France	Rift zone	Active	1356 Basel (M6 to 7)	
Rio Grande Rift		Rio Grande Valley, United States and Mexico	Rift zone			
Romeral Fault System	700	Colombia	Thrust and strike-slip	Active	1983 (M5.5), 1999 (M6.2)	
Sagami Trough	340	Off the coast of Honshū	Subduction zone	Active	see Kantō earthquakes	
Sagaing Fault	1500	Myanmar	Dextral	Active	1839, May 1930, Dec 1930, 1946, 1956, 2012, 2025	
Salzach-Ennstal-Mariazell-Puchberg Fault System (SEMP)	400	Austria	Sinistral strike-slip			
San Andreas Fault System (Banning fault, Mission Creek fault, South Pass fault, San Jacinto fault, Elsinore fault)	1300	California, United States	Dextral strike-slip	Active	1906 San Francisco (M7.7 to 8.25), 1989 Loma Prieta (M6.9)	
San Ramón Fault		Chile	Thrust fault			
Sawtooth Fault		Idaho, United States	Normal			
Seattle Fault		Washington, United States	Thrust fault	Active		
Septentrional-Orient Fault Zone		Caribbean	Sinistral strike-slip	Active	1842 Cap-Haïtien (M8.1), 2020 (M7.7)	
Shanxi Rift System	≥900	northern China	Rift zone	Active	1303 Hongdong (M7.2-7.6), 1556 Shaanxi (M8.0), 1626 Lingqiu (M7.0), 1695 Linfen (M7.8), 1815 Pinglu (M6.8)	
Sierra Nevada Fault		California, United States	Normal	Active	1872 Lone Pine (M7.4–8.3)	
Skyros-Edremit Fault zone	>150	Aegean Sea, Greece, Turkey	Dextral strike-slip	Active	1967, 1981	
Sobral Fault		Brazil	Strike-slip			
Sorong fault		Oceania	Sinistral strike-slip	Active	2009 Kepulauan Talaud (M7.2)	
South Tibetan Detachment	2000	Himalaya	Detachment (normal)	Paleogene		
Southeast Bathurst Fault Zone		Bathurst Island, Nunavut, Canada	Rift zone	Late Cretaceous to Eocene		
Sparta Fault	65	Peloponnese, Greece	Normal	Active	464 BC Sparta (M7.2)	
Spili Fault	20	Crete, Greece	Normal	Active		
Strabo Trench	300	Eastern Mediterranean Sea, Hellenic Trench	Sinistral strike-slip	Active		
Sunda subduction megathrust	5500	South East Asia	Subduction zone	Active	1833 Mentawai Islands (M9.2), 2004 Banda Aceh (M9.3), 2005 Nias (M8.6), 2007 Bengkulu (M8.4)	
Tacoma Fault	56	Washington, United States	Thrust fault	Active		
Tatsuda Fault		Japan		Active	1889 Kumamoto (M6.3)	
Tintina Fault		British Columbia, Canada to Alaska, United States	Strike-slip	Late Cretaceous to Oligocene		
Ulakhan Fault		Siberia to Aleutian Trench	Sinistral strike-slip	Active		
Ungava Fault Zone		Davis Strait	Strike-slip	Paleogene		
Virginia seismic zones		Virginia, United States		Active	2011 Virginia (M5.8)	
Wabash Valley seismic zone		Illinois, Indiana, United States	Normal	Active	2008 Illinois (M5.4)	
Wasatch Fault		Utah, United States	Normal	Active	2020 Salt Lake City (M5.7)	
Wellington Fault	>100	North Island, New Zealand	Dextral strike-slip	Active		
West Napa Fault	60	California, United States	Dextral	Active	2000 Yountville, 2014 South Napa	
Wairarapa Fault	>100	North Island, New Zealand	Dextral strike-slip	Active	1855 Wairarapa (M8.2)	
Wairau Fault	180	South Island, New Zealand	Dextral strike-slip	Active		
White Wolf Fault		San Joaquin Valley, California, United States	Oblique-reverse (sinstral)	Active	1952 Kern County (M7.5)	
Whittier Fault		California, United States	Strike-slip	Active		
Wilzetta Fault	89	Oklahoma, United States	Strike-slip	Active	2011 Oklahoma (M5.6)	
Xianshuihe fault system	350	China	Sinistral strike-slip	Active	1973 Luhuo (M7.6), 1981 Dawu (M6.8), 2010 Yushu (M6.9), 2022 Luding (M6.7)	
Yorba Linda Trend		California, United States	Oblique-slip	Active	2008 Chino Hills (M5.5)	

== See also ==
- Lists of earthquakes
- Tectonics
