= 1912 Maymyo earthquake =

Earthquake in Myanmar

- Location within Myanmar
- UTC time: 1912-05-23 02:24:04
- ISC event: 16958191
- USGS-ANSS: ComCat
- Local date: 23 May 1912
- Local time: 08:54:04
- Magnitude: 7.9 M_{w}
- Epicenter: 22.35°N 96.737°E
- Areas affected: Myanmar
- Max. intensity: RFS IX (Devastating tremor); MMI IX (Violent)
- Casualties: Unknown

The 1912 Maymyo earthquake or Burma earthquake struck Burma on the morning of May 23, with an epicentre near Taunggyi and Pyin Oo Lwin in Shan State. The earthquake was initially calculated at 8.0 on the surface-wave magnitude scale (M_{s}) by seismologist Beno Gutenberg and Charles Francis Richter, and described by them as being one of the most remarkable seismic events in the early 1900s. Recent re-evaluation of the earthquake, however, have revised the magnitude to 7.6–7.9. It was preceded by two foreshocks on May 18 and 21 with respective intensities V and VII on the Rossi–Forel scale, while the mainshock was assigned IX. Shaking was felt throughout most of Burma, parts of Siam and Yunnan; an area covering approximately 375,000 square miles. It was one of the largest earthquakes in the country.

== Tectonic setting ==
Myanmar is situated where four tectonic plates interact; the Indian, Eurasian, Sunda and Burma plates. Along the west coast of the Coco Islands, off the Rakhine coast, and into Bangladesh, is a highly oblique convergent boundary known as the Sunda megathrust. This large fault marks the boundary between the Indian and Burma plates. The megathrust emerges from the seafloor in Bangladesh, where it runs parallel and east of the Chin Hills. This boundary continues to north of Myanmar where it ends at the eastern Himalayas.

The Sagaing Fault, a north-south trending strike-slip fault, accommodates half of the motion between the Indian and Sunda landmasses, which Myanmar is situated on. Both landmasses move past each other at 35 to 36 mm (1.4 to 1.4 in) per year. The remaining movement is accommodated by geological faults in the Indo-Burman Ranges, West Andaman Fault, and faults in the Shan Plateau. One of these faults in the plateau is the Kyaukkyan Fault, a north–south-oriented fault that runs for 500 km (310 mi). Various geological features in the Inle Lake basin which the fault runs through indicate a history of transtension, transpression and strike-slip tectonics along its length. Estimates of the fault's slip rate range from 1 mm (0.039 in) per year to 9 to 18 mm (0.35 to 0.71 in) per year; the former's observation was based on studying a river offset by the fault while the latter was inferred from a displaced wall at Pawritha, north of Inle Lake. However, due to the wall's inexact age, dated to between the 9th and 13th centuries, the calculated slip may be inaccurate.

== Earthquake ==
Beno Gutenberg and Charles Francis Richter estimated this earthquake at 8.0 on the surface-wave magnitude scale in the second edition of their book Seismicity of the Earth and Associated Phenomena published in 1954. Later studies in 1983 and 1992 recalculated the magnitude of the earthquake at 7.6–7.7 M_{s}. Other estimates including one in Richter's 1958 book Elementary Seismology and the journal Secular seismic energy release in the circum-Pacific belt by Seweryn J. Duda presented 7.9 M_{s}. Further studies stated that if the magnitude was 8.0 as stated by Gutenberg and Richter, the fault rupture would require a length of at least 240 km (150 mi). Field studies and isoseismal data however inferred that the rupture length was 140 to 160 km (87 to 99 mi), which corresponds to a 7.6–7.7 M_{s} earthquake. Various researchers also estimated the moment magnitude in the range of 7.7 to 7.8 M_{w}, while the International Seismological Centre cataloged it at 7.9.

Geologist John Coggin Brown reported that at Kyaukkyan village, (Note: Located at 22.300°N 96.733°E) a railroad was displaced, which was later interpreted by other geologists as a surface rupture from the event. Geologic trenching of one strand of the Kyaukkyan Fault suggest the most recent paleoearthquake occurred after 1,270 ± 30 years Before Present (BP) which may correspond with the 1912 event. However, there remains several uncertainties and it does not present a direct evidence of the 1912 rupture. The rupture found at Kyaukkyan village may also be from another event that occurred before 1912, hence the fault responsible for the earthquake could be another branch of the Kyaukkyan Fault or an unrelated fault, such as the nearby Sagaing Fault.

Based on an assumed magnitude of 7.7 to 7.6 on the northern section of the fault, a rupture length of 160 km (99 mi) is required with a maximum offset estimated at 8 to 9 m (26 to 30 ft). Assuming a minimum estimate of the maximum slip was 7 to 8 m (23 to 26 ft) and an annual slip rate of 1 mm (0.039 in), the fault is required to accumulate tectonic strain for 7,000 to 8,000 years. Alternatively, based on a slip rate of 9 to 18 mm (0.35 to 0.71 in) per year, the interseismic period is 400 to 900 years. The researchers also discovered another paleoearthquake on the fault between 4660±30 and 1270 ± 30 BP. This allowed them to gauge that a 1912-like event would occur every 2,330 years and calculated the annual slip rate at 3.0 to 3.4 mm (0.12 to 0.13 in).

== Impact ==
The number of casualties in this earthquake is unknown, although the National Earthquake Information Center catalog stated "few" deaths occurred with the definition of it being around 1–50 deaths.

=== Pyin Oo Lwin ===
Witness reported the sound of thunder during the event. Wooden beams, bricks, and plaster fell from the Governor's House. Two chimneys fell off a station hospital and a roof of a family hospital collapsed. A Baptist church was seen swaying during the earthquake. The seismic intensity probably reached VIII–IX in this area. Many bungalows were damaged and some were unsafe for people. A major rockslide disrupted service on the Burma Railway between Nawnghkio and Hsum-hsai. Surface rupture was visible and a railway track was bent. Landslides occurred in a gorge near Gokteik station, which was also affected. Class A brick masonry buildings suffered serious structural damage corresponding to Grade 4 on the European macroseismic scale (EMS). Numerous landslides were triggered on the nearby mountain ranges and every pagoda in the city was obliterated.

=== Mandalay ===
Many witnesses mentioned difficulties attempting to stand during the event. A cathedral suffered extensive cracking throughout. The Wesleyan School also suffered major damage as a masonry building. Three-quarters of Class A brick buildings and nearly all pagodas and monasteries were damaged. Five buildings suffered total collapse, Grade 5 on the EMS while an additional 31 sustained Grade 4 damage. On the Rossi–Forel scale, the shaking reached IX.

=== Taunggyi ===
The shock lasted more than a minute there, nearly all chimneys had fallen and military buildings were in critical condition.

=== Mogok ===
Shaking created cracks in brick buildings and collapsed several pagodas. Landslides damaged water pipelines and cut off power to the city for two nights.

=== Other areas ===
In places slightly further away from the earthquake such as parts of Shan state, Bago region, Kachin state, Sagaing region, and Kayah state, noises were heard, and shaking intensity ranged between VI–VII (Strong–Very Strong). Some buildings cracked but the shaking was not enough to cause destruction. In Hsipaw, many masonry buildings suffered serious damage, and chimneys collapsed. Liquefaction events took place in many parts.

In northern and southern Burma, Yunnan, and parts of Siam, the shock had become a gentle rocking sensation and was felt by most of the population. The intensity here was IV–V (Light–Moderate). No damage was reported.

In Rangoon and the Chin Hills, the earthquake was barely perceivable. However, the motion was still strong enough that lamps were seen swinging, oil and water in Seikkyi Kanaungto township was seen to sway about. Akyab marked the extreme point where shaking could still be felt, none was observed past the city.

== See also ==
- List of earthquakes in 1912
- List of earthquakes in Myanmar
- 2025 Myanmar earthquake
