= Southeast Bathurst Fault Zone =

System of faults on southeastern Bathurst Island in the Canadian Arctic Archipelago

The Southeast Bathurst Fault Zone is a north–south trending system of extensional faults forming a graben-like structure on southeastern Bathurst Island in the Canadian Arctic Archipelago. It lies within the Boothia Uplift and is one of several fault zones associated with the Canadian Arctic Rift System. The fault zone formed in the latest Cretaceous to early Tertiary when extension of the Boreal Rifting Episode penetrated the North American continent from the Canada Basin.

The Southeast Bathurst Fault Zone was reactivated when the Eurekan Rifting Episode uplifted and compressed the region during the Eocene. This brought magmatism commonly associated with rifting and doming to the Freemans Cove area. Nearly all magmatic activity was confined to regions within the fault zone and involved the emplacement of dikes, sills, small volcanic plugs and agglomeratic vents. The magmas are chemically bimodal, consisting mainly of nephelinites or larnite-normative nephelinites and basanites along with lesser olivine melilite nephelinites, phonolites and tholeiitic and alkali basalts.

== See also ==
- List of fault zones
