= Petrified Springs fault =

Geologic fault in Nevada, United States

The Petrified Springs Fault is a right lateral-moving (dextral) geologic fault located in western Nevada, United States. It is considered an integral part of the Walker Lane.
