= Moab Fault =

Extensional fault near Moab, Utah (USA)

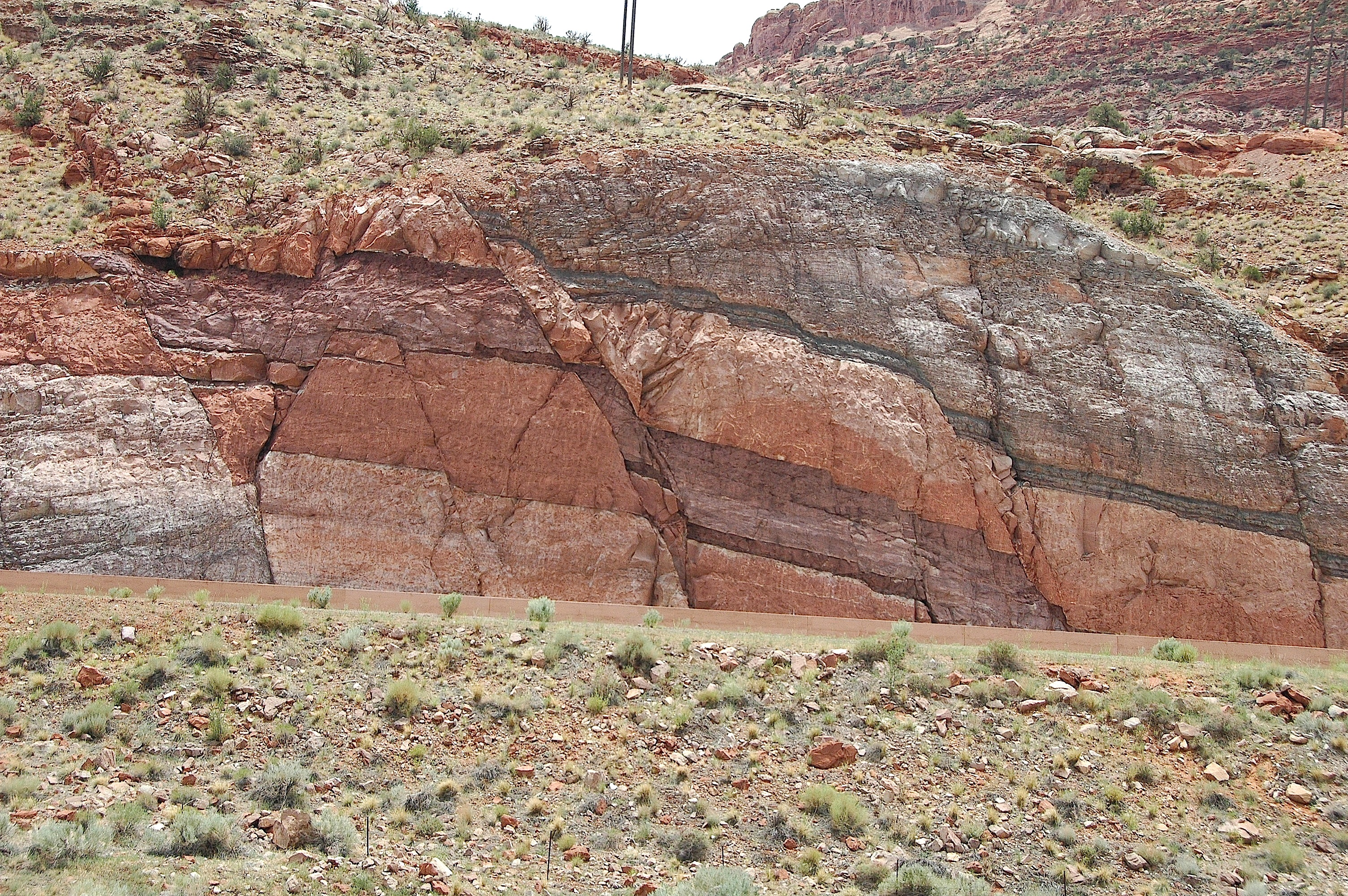
- Faults in the Honaker Trail Formation, Moab Canyon

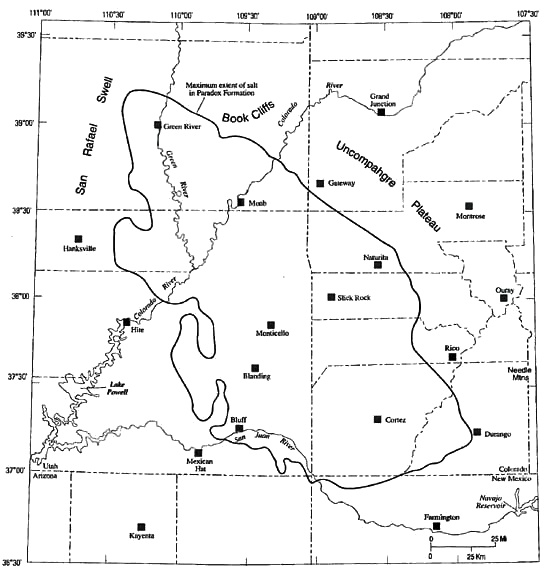
- Map depicting the regional geological setting of the Paradox basin
- Coordinates: 38°37'59.9"N, 109°40'1.2"W 38°37′59.9″N 109°40′1.2″W
- Country: United States
- State: Utah
- Cities: Moab, Utah

Characteristics
- Length: 45 km (28 mi)
- Displacement: 960 m (3,150 ft)

Tectonics
- Type: extensional fault
- Age: Permian–Triassic

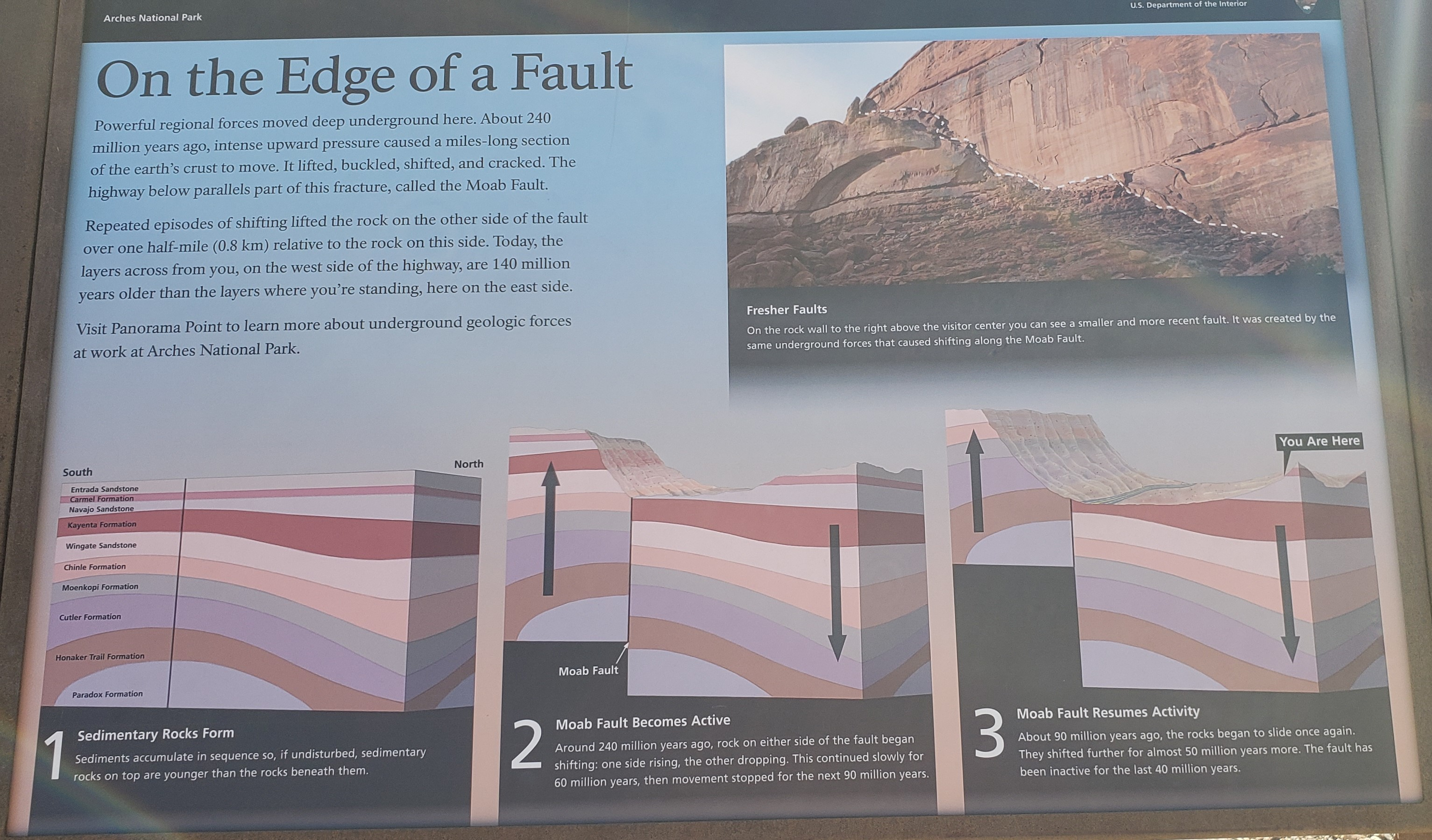
Geology of the Moab Fault descriptive poster located at Arches National Park

The Moab Fault, near Moab, Utah, United States, is an extensional fault that runs approximately NW-SE, passing to the west of the Arches National Park. It is about 45 km (28 mi) long and has a maximum displacement of about 960 m (3,150 ft). The fault connects with the Tenmile graben in the north and extends through the Moab-Spanish Valley to the south. The fault outcrop has a well-defined fault zone bordered by a damage zone of minor faults and fractures.

The Moab Fault has been the focus of a number of studies, covering a range of topics including fault zone architecture, fault cementation, and fault seal prediction.

== Geological setting ==
The Moab Fault was active during a period between the Triassic and early Tertiary, with a break from mid-Jurassic until at least mid-Cretaceous. It is associated with two salt anticlines formed within the Fold and Fault Belt of the Paradox Basin in east-central Utah. The Paradox Basin is part of the Colorado Plateau that formed during the Late Paleozoic. Movement on the basement faults began in the Proterozoic and was greatest during mid-Pennsylvanian Rocky Mountain tectonism. The fault was reactivated at ~60 Ma, likely due to reinitiated salt movement during the Laramide orogeny. Following its deposition, the salt was deformed to form a series of salt anticlines that were ultimately buried by 1–2 km of Jurassic to Tertiary sediments.

== Fault geometry ==
The architecture of the Moab fault zone is highly variable, and has been studied by several authors. The first systematic study was conducted by Foxford et al. in 1998, which classified architectural elements into slip band zones, shaley gouge zones and sandstone cataclastics and breccias. Thirty-seven transect exposures within the Moab fault zone were described. These exposures provide excellent data on lateral variation and structure features within the fault zone. The most studied transects include the Moab Canyon, R191 Canyon, Corral Canyon, Courthouse Mine, Bartlett Wash, and Waterfall Canyon.

The Moab Fault is a sharply defined brittle shear zone (1–10 m wide). The overall geometry of the southern fault segment is that of a faulted anticline, modified by a minor component of normal drag adjacent to the fault. The fault is composed of three main components: a poorly exposed southern section, a central section (where the greatest throws are found), and a complex branching northern section that tips out to the northwest. At the north end of the Moab valley, there is a fault transfer zone, where the fault steps east. This zone transfers the displacement along the fault from one segment to another. Within this zone there is very dense faulting. Along the southern segment, footwall bed dips define a structural high symmetrically disposed about the point of maximum throw. A prominent hanging wall feature of the southern segment is the Moab Anticline, with a crestal collapse graben accommodated by an array of normal faults. The Moab Anticline is an asymmetric fold with a wavelength of approximately 1 km, an amplitude of 350 m and a length of over 10 km.

The internal geometry of the Moab fault zone is complex in terms of the numbers of slip zones, the partitioning of throw between them and the distribution of fault rocks, all of which vary over the fault surface. One study by Berg and Skar^{5} analyzes the arrangement of fractures in damage zones of the Bartlett segment of the Moab Fault. The Bartlett fault consist of a fault core surrounded by damage zones in the footwall and hanging wall. The fault core consists of a variety of fault rocks and entrained bodies of clastic host rocks, which indicate variation in strain intensity and deformation style. Berg and Skar suggest that the most important cause for asymmetric strain distribution is the development of the hanging wall syncline and the resulting asymmetric stress pattern expected to exist during fault propagation.

== Sedimentation and stratigraphy ==
The sedimentation of the Moab area was primarily influenced by marine or lacustrine incursions into the margins of major Jurassic ergs. This area consists of a heterogeneous series of dominantly clastic sedimentary rocks. The basal Navajo Sandstone to top Entrada Sandstone interval is separated into six sedimentologically distinct stratigraphic units: the Navajo Sandstone, the Page Sandstone, the Dewey Bridge and Slick Rock members of the Entrada Sandstone, the Moab Tongue, and the Curtis Formation. The stratigraphy of the outcropping fault zone can be divided into three lithological groups: mudstone-dominated, mixed mudstone-sandstone, and sandstone-rich sequences. The mixed mudstone-sandstone sequences include interbedded fluvial and aeolian sandstones and floodplain/lacustrine mudstones and siltstones. Sandstone-rich intervals are primarily aeolian in origin.

== Distribution of clays and cements ==
Distinctive types of veining, calcite cementation and iron oxide reduction exist adjacent to the fault, especially in Jurassic Navajo and Entrada sandstones. Calcite, barite, ankerite, and pyrite cemented veins are found in immediate proximity of the fault. The presence and amount of clays in fault rocks is a useful indicator in determining:

- Fault rock composition and mechanical and hydrologic fault zone properties
- Paleoflow migration in the Moab Fault
- Fault seal prediction

=== Mechanical and hydrologic properties ===
The presence of clays in fault rock influences both the mechanical and hydrologic properties of clay-bearing faults. Field mapping shows that layers of clay gouge and shale smear are common along the Moab Fault. Solum et al. describe the occurrence of clay-rich fault along four fault zones: R191, Corral Canyon, Courthouse Canyon, and the Bartlett Wash exposure. While fault rocks along the R191 location and Bartlett Wash are enriched in clays relative to protolith, those at Corral Canyon and Courthouse Canyon show little difference in composition relative to protolith, suggesting that fault rock formation at the latter locations is governed by mechanical as opposed to authigenic processes.

=== Paleoflow migration ===
Many studies have documented multiple episodes of fluid flow along the Moab Fault since its formation in the Permo-Triassic. In one study, Eichhubl et al. use the distribution of calcite cement as an indicator of paleofluid migration. They infer that fault-parallel fluid flow was focused along fault segments overprinted by joints and sheared joints. These conclusions support Chan et al.’s hydrogeologic model, which proposes that hydrocarbon and basin brines from Pennsylvanian source rocks migrated along the Moab fault, moving into the porous sandstone units where they interacted with oxygenated meteoric water. Chan et al. use Ar-Ar dating to define the age of this fluid movement. They determine a mineralization age of c. 25-20 Ma, which coincides with episodic uplift of the Colorado Plateau or with La Sal Mountains volcanism.

The Moab Fault is characterized by patterns of iron oxide reduction that also suggest the fault acted as a conduit for mineralizing fluids. It is suggested that red sandstones adjacent to the Moab Fault were bleached by reducing fluids. Iron oxide reduction is concentrated within high permeability, well-connected sandstones and spatially associated with cemented veins – indicating that the reduction event coincided with vein formation, and thus with the final stages of faulting. Permeability along the fault may have been promoted by the highly anisotropic shaley gouge fabrics or by fault zone fractures.

After analyzing geochemical data of carbonate cements and iron-oxide reduced sandstones from the Moab Anticline, Garden et al. suggest that following fault movement, the fault zone was the locus of vertical migration of over-pressured hydrocarbon and aqueous, carbonate-saturated fluids. These observations, combined with the extensive presence of shaley gouge even at low stratigraphic levels suggest that the Moab Fault was a conduit for fluid flow while supporting significant across-fault pressure differences.

=== Fault seal prediction ===
Clay smear is among the family of structures that detect fluid flow in sedimentary basins. Clay smear processes are applied to instances of cross-fault flow when porous and permeable rocks, specifically sandstones and shales, are cut by normal faults. According to Foxford et al., the most important feature of the Moab Fault zone from the standpoint of seal potential assessment is the nearly constant presence of at least one shaley gouge layer. The shale gouge ratio is one way to describe the amount of clay smear in a fault zone, and is simply defined as the percentage of shale/clay in the slipped interval. Shale gouge ratio, when applied to sand-shale sequences, indicates the proportion of phyllosilicate material expected to be incorporated into the fault rock. Thus it provides a measure of the seal capacity, as a shale layer in a fault zone may provide an effective seal to across-fault flow. Previous studies show that a shale gouge ratio of ~20% defines the boundary between sealing and non-sealing faults, with faults sealing at shale gouge ratios above this ‘cut-off’ value. Shale gouge is present in the Moab Fault at values >c. 20%, but varies depending on the location of the transect.
