= Christchurch Fault =

Seismic fault in New Zealand

The Christchurch Fault is an active seismic fault running under the city of Christchurch in the middle of New Zealand's South Island.

It runs from an area close to Riccarton, under the Central City, through the eastern suburbs off the coast of New Brighton. It runs parallel to the more destructive Port Hills Fault that lies 5 km (3.1 mi) to the south of the Christchurch Fault.

The Christchurch fault is believed to have been responsible for a series of earthquakes that rocked the city on Boxing Day of 2010. It may have been responsible for a moderate earthquake that shook the city in 1869.
