= 1995 Aigio earthquake =

Earthquake affecting Greece

- Location within Greece
- UTC time: 1995-06-15 00:15:48
- ISC event: 98709
- USGS-ANSS: ComCat
- Local date: 15 June 1995
- Local time: 03:15:48 EET
- Magnitude: 6.4–6.5 M_{w}
- Depth: 3–14.2 km (1.9–8.8 mi)
- Epicentre: 38.401°N 22.283°E
- Type: Normal faulting
- Areas affected: Greece
- Total damage: US$660 million
- Max. intensity: MMI VIII (Severe); EMS-98 IX (Destructive)
- Peak acceleration: 0.54 g
- Foreshocks: Many, largest was M_{w} 4.6
- Aftershocks: Thousands, largest was M_{w} 5.6
- Casualties: 26 dead, 60–200 injured

An earthquake struck Western Greece near the coastal city of Aigio at 03:15:48 local time on 15 June 1995. The second destructive earthquake to strike Greece in a month, it measured 6.4–6.5 on the moment magnitude scale (M_{w}). It was assigned a maximum Modified Mercalli intensity of VIII (Severe) and EMS-98 intensity of IX (Destructive). The horizontal peak ground acceleration reached 0.54 g and ground velocity peaked at 52 cm/s (20 in/s)—the strongest ground motion ever recorded in Greece. Fifteen minutes after the mainshock, a large aftershock struck, causing further damage to Aigio. Faulting occurred on either the Aigion fault or an unnamed offshore fault. Other faults in the region have the potential to produce earthquakes up to M_{w} 6.9, which poses a risk to Aigio and the surrounding Gulf of Corinth.

Monetary damage from the earthquake reached $660 million (in 1995 USD). Significant destruction occurred; the collapse of two buildings left 26 dead and up to 200 injured. In the aftermath, several countries and organizations provided disaster aid, including search and rescue and refugee assistance operations. Many countries also donated medical supplies, temporary shelter, water treatment equipment, and a ship to house survivors. The Greek government issued seismic loans to aid in the rebuilding of Aigio, though it may have encouraged the construction of taller buildings—increasing Aigio's future seismic hazard. Controversy arose over the lack of a warning for the earthquake, as several sources warned officials that a major earthquake would occur.

== Tectonic setting ==
Western Greece is affected by the ongoing back-arc extension within the Aegean Sea plate caused by the subduction of the African plate in the Hellenic subduction zone. Stresses in the region create normal faults to accommodate the 10–15 mm (0.39–0.59 in)/yr extensional strain. In the Gulf of Corinth, faults have formed as a result of these stresses to accommodate some of the fastest known rates of continental extension. Crustal normal faults do not extend further than 40 km (25 mi) deep in this region, as at that depth the crust transitions to mantle at the Mohorovičić discontinuity.

The Aigion fault is a north-dipping, west-northwest trending (fault direction), young (at most 300,000 years old) fault that has been growing in the past couple of hundred thousand years through the linking of several fault segments. The fault is composed of two main segments: an offshore and an onshore portion, and they extend for 8.621–12 km (5.357–7.456 mi) combined. The fault is also 7–12 km (4.3–7.5 mi) wide. It started developing at earliest 300,000 years ago, and its slip has increased over time. The onshore Aigion fault has a slip rate between 2.5–4.5 mm (0.10–0.18 in)/yr and 9–11 mm (0.35–0.43 in)/yr at a dip angle of 50 to 60 degrees with a strike of 100 degrees; the offshore segment slips at 1.8–3.2 mm (0.07–0.13 in)/yr at a dip angle of 60 degrees. It has a throw of 200 m (660 ft) and a dip of 55 degrees to the north. The Aigion fault reactivated during this earthquake. It showed surface rupturing and produced the largest aftershock. The Aigion fault influences the physical malforming of fan-deltas and associated alluvial plains, thus controlling the geomorphology of a 15-kilometre-long (9.3 mi) by 5-kilometre-wide (3.1 mi) area.

There are two other major faults near Aigio. The Eliki fault, which runs near the town of Eliki, and the Psathopyrgos fault, which is near the village of Psathopyrgos. The Eliki fault initially developed between 0.7 and 1 million years ago. The fault is split into two segments: the West Eliki and East Eliki faults. The West Eliki fault is 11–13 km (6.8–8.1 mi) long, and has a dip of 60 degrees; the East Eliki fault runs for 9 km (5.6 mi). The Psathopyrgos fault is a major fault structure lying at the western end of the Gulf of Corinth. The fault is 8.505 km (5.285 mi) long, 7 km (4.3 mi) deep, has a dip of 60 degrees, and a strike of 87 degrees.

== Geology ==
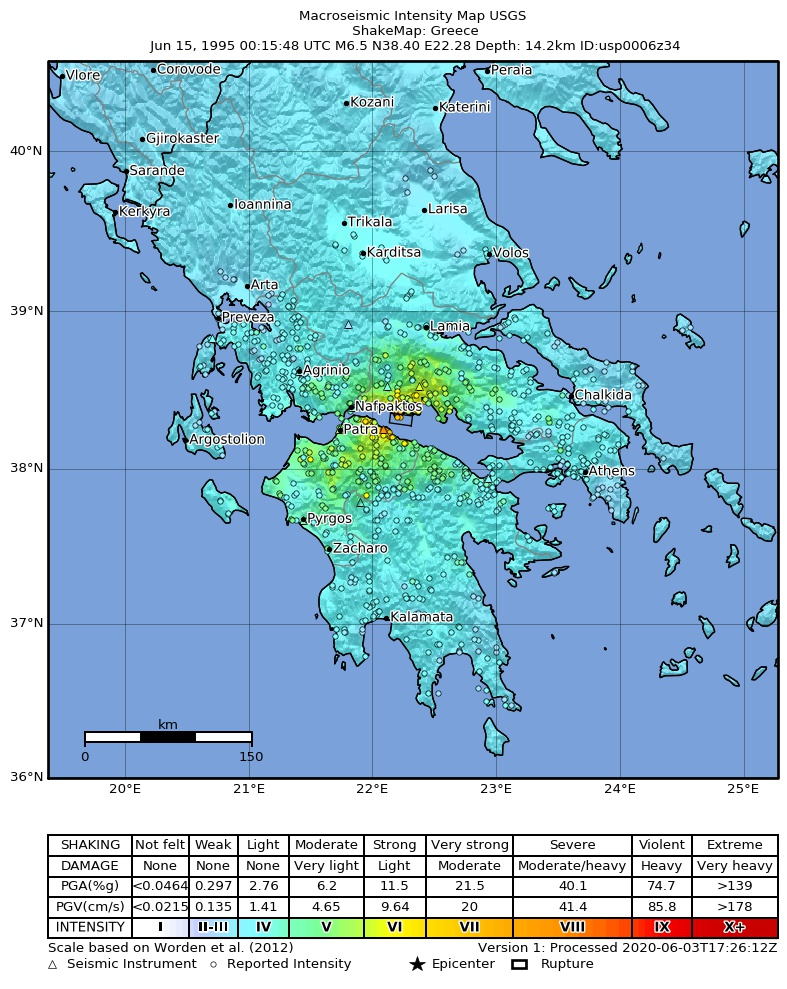
ShakeMap by the USGS indicating the Modified Mercalli Intensity shaking throughout western Greece

Before the earthquake struck, strange phenomena were reported in the region. Minutes before the M_{w} 6.4–6.5 (Note: Recorded 6.2 M_{L} & 6.1–6.2 M_{s}.) earthquake struck, people from several areas near the epicenter claimed to have heard the sound of a strong wind in otherwise calm weather. There were also multiple reports of strange animal activity such as dogs running away, and cats being frightened. Earthquake lights were also reported before the shock within a 17 km (11 mi) radius of the epicenter. A "bright red glow" was reported shortly before the earthquake struck. Fifteen minutes after the mainshock, the largest aftershock (M_{w} 5.6) (Note: Recorded 5.4 on the mb and M_{s} scales.) struck and had a maximum Modified Mercalli intensity (MMI) of VI. Thousands of aftershocks were recorded daily while temporary seismometers were stationed in the vicinity of the epicenter.

=== Strong ground motion ===
This earthquake struck only a few weeks after a devastating M_{s} 6.6 earthquake struck Greece. That event took place near Kozani on May 13, as the result of normal faulting. The Aigio earthquake a month later also took place as the result of normal faulting, on either the Aigion fault or an offshore fault. Studies disagree over the rupture characteristics. Computed and recorded accelerogram values indicate that inhabitants near the epicenter experienced 0.54 g of horizontal acceleration, as well as up to 0.20 g of vertical acceleration, which was double the maximum expected in the region according to the new Greek Seismic Code, updated only months before. Ground velocity peaked at 52 cm/s (20 in/s), the strongest ground motion ever recorded in Greece. The peak ground motion lasted for 0.45 seconds, and strong ground motion lasted for 5 seconds. Aigio experienced the strongest shaking, and as a result, had the most damage from the earthquake. The United States Geological Survey (USGS) ShakeMap for the event overestimates shaking near Aigio in comparison to synthetic modeling, likely as the result of the strong ground motion that was recorded at one station near Aigio. The maximum MMI was VIII (Severe), and the maximum EMS-98 was IX (Destructive).

=== Surface faulting ===
The Aigion fault showed detectable surface rupturing of less than 4 cm (1.6 in). There are two main theories as to how the mainshock occurred. The first is that it occurred on the Aigion fault. The given length of rupture along the Aigion fault is 6.7–7.2 km (4.2–4.5 mi). The length of visible surface ruptures align with expectations for an earthquake of this size. The other theory explaining the mainshock is rupture along a low-angle normal fault 15 km (9.3 mi) to the northeast of Aigio, and north of the Eliki fault. The fault has estimated dimensions of either 9 km (5.6 mi) east to west, and 15 km (9.3 mi) along dip, or a length of 12.61 km (7.84 mi), with a width of 9.45 km (5.87 mi). Slip estimates range from 0.87 m (2 ft 10 in) to 1.483 m (4 ft 10.4 in). This scenario explains the surface rupture as secondary features created as the result of the high ground motion of the mainshock rather than true slip along the Aigion fault—as proven by GPS and InSAR data. The study also concludes that the earthquake likely increased the chances of an earthquake on the Aigion fault itself.

== Impact ==
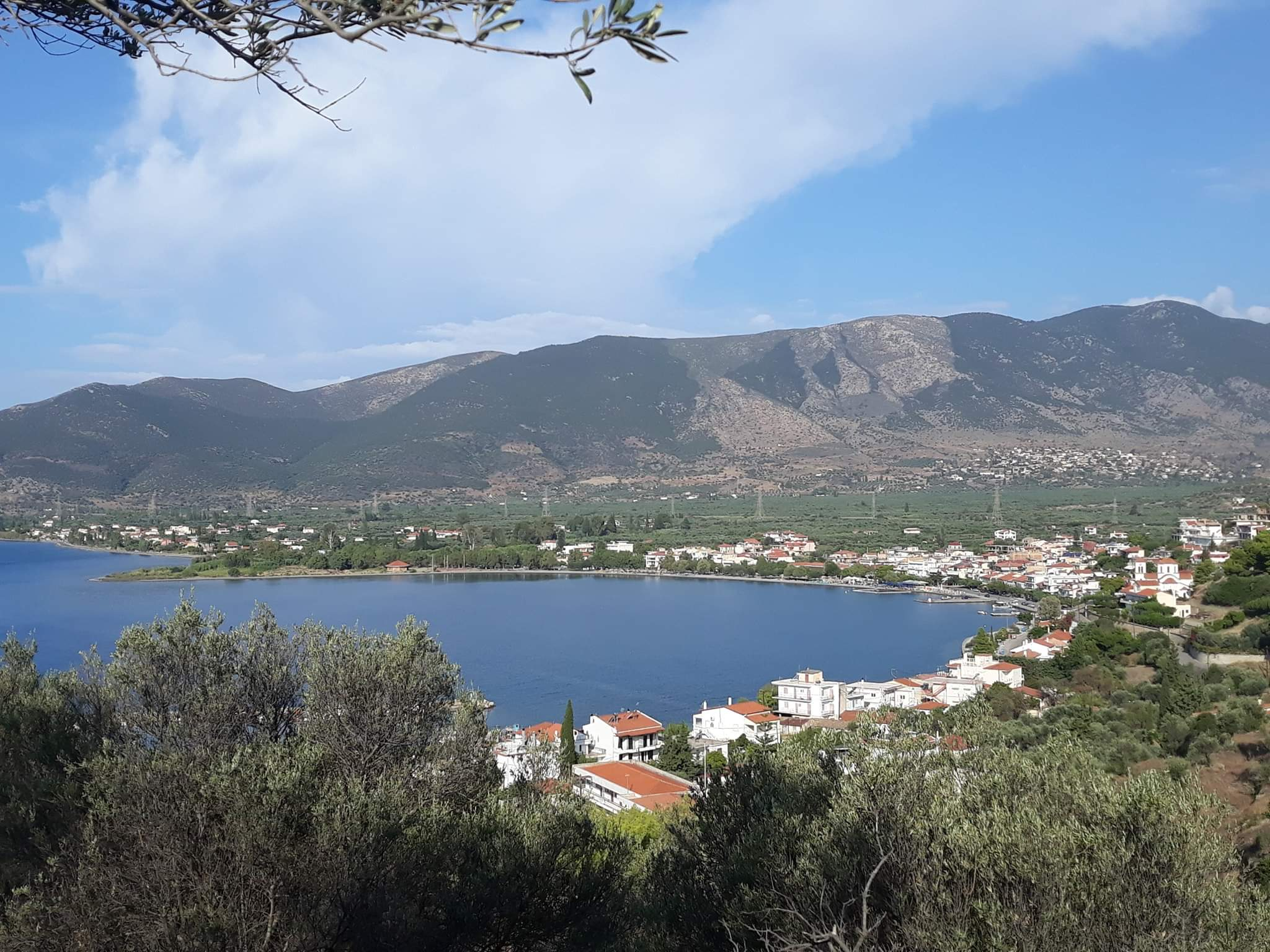
The coast of Erateini where coastal effects of the earthquake were observed

The shallow depth and strong ground motion contributed to the death toll and monetary costs. The earthquake caused 26 deaths. Sources disagree on the number of injuries; reports soon after the earthquake claimed 60 injuries occurred, but papers published decades later report 200 injuries. The event also left 2,100 homeless in Aigio alone, and 15,000 people total were displaced. Deaths occurred in two parts of Aigio: at a collapsed apartment on Despotopoulon Street, and in the village of Valimitika where a hotel collapsed, killing 16. At the same hotel, an 8-year-old boy was successfully rescued after being stuck under rubble for 44 hours. Among the dead were 10 French tourists. Aigio and Eratini sustained substantial damage, most occurring in northern Aigio. Six buildings totally collapsed, but reports also differ on how many buildings were damaged beyond repair. A 1999 research paper claims 1071 structures were irreparable, and a 2017 conference paper claims this number to be 1887. In Aigio, 2.5 percent of all buildings were designated unsafe to enter and many were demolished. In downtown Aigio, at least 163 buildings had non-reparable damage, and a further 443 suffered repairable damage. Damage was most prevalent in central and eastern Aigio. The event was felt in Athens, Ioannina, Kalamai, Kardhitsa, Kozani, and Kefallinia; up to 225 km (140 mi) away from the epicenter. The aftershock caused further damage including several building collapses.

=== Geological effects ===
Many surface effects were attributed to this earthquake, including liquefaction, submarine landslides, coastal retreat, and ground fissures. East-west oriented scarp formed from this event in the vicinity of Aigio. Scarps measuring 0.5–1 m (1 ft 8 in – 3 ft 3 in) were observed near the Eliki River Delta. The main shock caused widespread liquefaction to several types of infrastructure. Liquefaction reportedly occurred over a 10 km (6.2 mi) area near the coast between the mouth of the Selinountas River and Cape Trypias. Sand boils formed near Diakofto. In Erateini, liquefaction, underwater landslides, coastal changes, and rockfalls were reported. Along the north coast, liquefaction was sparse, mostly occurring near Erateini. Ground fissures were observed along the coast near Aigio between the Selinountas and Vouraikos rivers, as well as near Avythos. They varied in length up to dozens of meters, with a maximum depth of 60 cm (24 in). These fissures formed as a result of the strong shaking. Sediment failure was found at four sites within a 9 km (5.6 mi) radius of the epicenter.

Drastic coastal changes were observed, such as at Erateini, where the shoreline moved 2–3 m (6 ft 7 in – 9 ft 10 in) inland. Cape Trypias experienced dozens of meters of inundation. On land, there were only a few scattered rockfalls, although the coastal retreat and some other factors indicated a large submarine landslide. Later oceanographic surveys of the area provided more evidence and detail of these landslides. A tsunami with a run-up of 1 m (3 ft 3 in) was measured near Aigio's coast.

== Response ==
Shortly after the earthquake struck, the United Nations Department of Humanitarian Affairs sent a team of six rescue dogs along with an advanced rescue team from the Swiss Disaster Relief unit. A French team with dogs and medical supplies arrived to the scene to help out with search and rescue (SAR) operations. A second Swiss team with a 35-strong SAR team was also deployed to the affected areas. Other countries such as Germany and Denmark offered extra assistance, but the Greek authorities decided that the French and Swiss operations were sufficient for the relatively small scale disaster. By the next day, UK, German, and Danish-based rescue organizations had offered SAR assistance, and the government of Italy alerted an SAR team, its fire brigade, and health assistance unit. SAR operations in Aigio ceased a week after the earthquake, which rescued 68 people. Italy also offered 20 houses for 100 people, power generators, potable water treatment equipment, and the rescue ship San Marco to sustain the living needs of 400 people, which Greece accepted. Japan's government released 50 large tents and 1,000 blankets to help the affected people. To aid in reconstruction in the aftermath of the event, the government created a financing program to ease monetary losses. The program allowed people to take out 'seismic loans', of which 30% was free, and the remaining 70% was interest-free. These loans actually encouraged building bigger and taller buildings, which may have made the area more vulnerable to future earthquakes. Some buildings damaged by the earthquake were reinforced with concrete to make them more stable.

== Controversy ==
Concern arose regarding the lack of an issued earthquake warning for the area by Greece's Earthquake Planning and Protection Agency. Panayiotis Varotsos, a University of Athens professor, employed his controversial VAN technique which he developed to forecast earthquakes. The system works by using electrical signals in the ground to predict earthquakes. Another warning came from Gerasimos Papadopoulos, a professor at the Geodynamic Institute of the National Observatory of Athens. His reasoning for issuing the alert was that a recent previous earthquake in northwestern Greece would cause another event within two months. As a result, a prosecutor accused Dimitris Papanikolaou—the director of the Greek earthquake planning and protection agency—of ignoring multiple warnings about the earthquake. This was met with outrage by the scientific community, and the acting director of the Geodynamic Institute of the National Observatory of Athens stated that the prosecutor would have changed his mind if he listened to Papanikolaou's colleagues.

== Future hazard ==
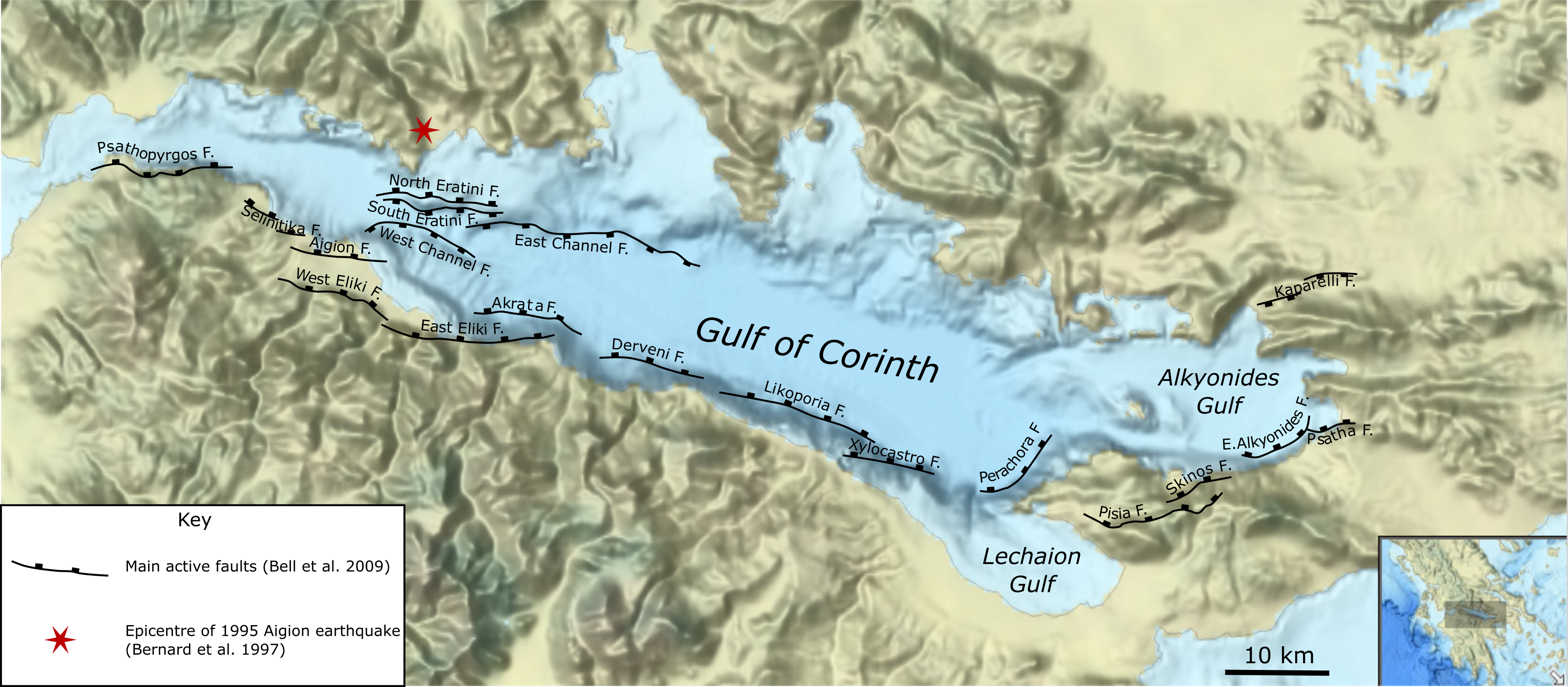
Map of main active faults on the northern and southern margins of the Gulf of Corinth and epicenter of the 1995 earthquake

The city of Aigio, and more broadly the Gulf of Corinth, lies atop a large seismogenic zone (100–130 km (62–81 mi) long and 20–40 km (12–25 mi) wide) that accommodates 1–1.5 cm (0.39–0.59 in)/yr of north–south rifting within the Aegean Sea plate. A network of normal faults have developed to accommodate the deformation, including a series of linked large faults near populated areas such as the Psathopyrgos, Aigion, and Eliki faults. Many of these faults are in the later stages of their earthquake cycles, and may be ready to produce M_{w} 6.0–6.7 earthquakes in the coming decades. The Aigio area is struck by M_{w} 6 events roughly every 120 years, and the area in the southern Gulf of Corinth can generate events up to M_{w} 6.9 in a multi-fault rupture scenario.

On the Psathopyrgos fault, major earthquakes occur at a frequency of every 350 years, with an estimated uncertainty of 175 years. The last known major earthquake to occur on this section of fault struck in 1756, which means that the fault is around 75% of the way through its cycle. Simulations show earthquakes with maximum moment magnitudes up to M_{w} 6.42 taking place along the fault, and the maximum accumulated slip deficit (amount of built up energy since the last major earthquake) could cause a M_{w} 6–6.5 event. The 1995 Aigio earthquake may have put more strain on the fault, allowing it to slip sooner.

Earthquake activity along the Aigion fault is well documented, with events recorded in 1748, and 1817. The recurrence interval between large ruptures on the Aigion fault is roughly 390 ± 195 years. The eastern portion of the Aigion fault lies near where the Eliki fault slipped in an earthquake in 1861, although the Aigion fault is a few kilometers to the north and may act as a step-over. The fault could rupture with the Psathopyrgos fault to its west and create a M_{w} 6.42 event, and empirical relations, as well as accumulated slip deficit, suggest a maximum of a M_{w} 6.5 earthquake.

The Eliki or Helike faults are responsible for three known major events, occurring in 373 BC, 1861, and 1888. The role of the western fault is unknown, due to the lack of earthquake activity along its western portion. In 373 BC, a strong earthquake, potentially occurring on the Eliki fault, destroyed the ancient city of Helike. In 1861, an M_{s} 6.6 earthquake struck the area and ruptured 13 km (8.1 mi) of the Eliki fault. Maximum observed offset from the event was 220 cm (87 in). In 1888, another event struck, but this time on the western portion of the fault system. It was a magnitude 6-6.6 event with slip of 0.5–1.20 m (1 ft 8 in – 3 ft 11 in). This section of the fault may be close to rupturing, and can produce another earthquake of similar size to the one in 1888. Slip rate is estimated at 2.4–5 mm (0.094–0.197 in)/yr. The accumulated slip deficit on only the western portion of the fault is enough to create a M_{w} 6.6 earthquake. The 1995 Aigio earthquake may have accommodated some of the stress that the Eliki fault was experiencing, thereby increasing the amount of time until the next major earthquake on the fault.

== See also ==
- 1981 Gulf of Corinth earthquakes
- List of earthquakes in 1995
- List of earthquakes in Greece
