= Pyramid Lake Fault Zone =

Geologic fault in Nevada, U.S.

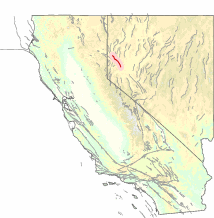
- The Pyramid Lake Fault Zone in Nevada, United States

- Location of the fault in Western Nevada Pyramid Lake Fault Zone (the United States)
- Etymology: Pyramid Indian Reservation
- Location: Fernley
- Coordinates: 39°45′N 119°20′W
- Country: United States
- Region: Western Nevada
- State: Nevada
- Cities: Reno

Characteristics
- Range: Virginia Range
- Length: 49 km (30 mi)
- Strike: N13°W

Tectonics
- Status: Active
- Type: Strike slip fault
- Rock units: Alluvium; Eolian; Lacustrine
- Age: Holocene; late Pleistocene

The Pyramid Lake Fault Zone is an active right lateral-moving (dextral) geologic fault located in western Nevada. It is considered an integral part of the Walker Lane.

The fault zone extends to the southeast from Pyramid Lake roughly parallel to the course of the Truckee River between the Truckee Range to the northeast and the Pah Rah Range to the southwest.

The Pyramid Lake Fault is the easternmost of a series of en echelon faults of the Walker Lane straddling the Nevada – California border. The parallel striking faults to the west are the Warm Springs Valley Fault, the Honey Lake Fault, and the Mohawk Valley Fault.

== Geometry and slip rates ==
The Pyramid Lake Fault Zone exhibits a complex three-dimensional subsurface architecture and segmentation pattern. High-resolution seismic CHIRP profiling beneath Pyramid Lake reveals that the fault zone has a "fanning open" geometry to the north. Within the lake basin, a major structural transition occurs where the down-to-the-east slip along the southern dextral fault zone switches (reverses polarity) to down-to-the-west displacement on the Lake Range fault to the north. This structural configuration creates an asymmetric pull-apart basin and a prominent releasing stepover (including at Emerson Pass). The Lake Range fault segment possesses a minimum vertical slip rate of approximately 1.0 mm/yr and is capable of producing earthquakes of magnitude Mw 6.4 to 7.0.

Historically, paleoseismic investigations estimated a late Pleistocene right-lateral slip rate of 2.6 ± 0.3 mm/yr based on four surface-rupturing events over the last 15,000 years. This rate implied exceptionally large coseismic offsets of 7–9 meters per event for a fault of only 50 km length. To resolve this discrepancy, researchers utilized unmanned aerial vehicles (UAVs) and Structure-from-Motion (SfM) photogrammetric processing to map offset Lahontan shorelines. This computer-vision-assisted mapping refined the right-lateral offset to 19 ± 9 meters since 15.5 ka, yielding a lower minimum slip rate of 1.2 ± 0.6 mm/yr (with actual range of 0.5 to 1.6 mm/yr) and reconciling the expected coseismic displacement to a typical 3–5 meters per event.

== Additional reading ==
- Late Pleistocene fault slip rate, earthquake recurrence, and recency of slip along the Pyramid Lake fault zone, northern Walker Lane, United States
- USGS Database
