= Seismic zone =

Geographic zones of interest in seismology

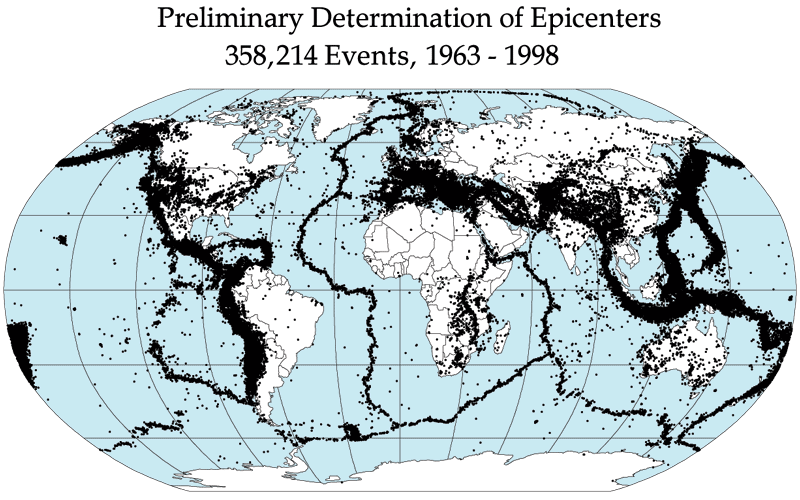
Earthquake epicenters 1963–98

In seismology, a seismic zone or seismic belt is an area of seismicity potentially sharing a common cause. It can be referred to as an earthquake belt as well. It may also be a region on a map for which a common areal rate of seismicity is assumed for the purpose of calculating probabilistic ground motions. An obsolete definition is a region on a map in which a common level of seismic design is required.

== The major seismic zones ==
A type of seismic zone is a Wadati–Benioff zone which corresponds with the down-going slab in a subduction zone. The world's greatest seismic belt, known as the Circum-Pacific seismic belt, is where a majority of the Earth's quakes occur. Approximately 81% of major earthquakes occur along this belt. The Circum-Pacific seismic belt has earned its own nickname and is often referred to as the Ring of Fire, a ring-like formation that encompasses a majority of the Pacific Ocean. The notorious San Andreas Fault, responsible for many major quakes in the West Coast of the United States, lies within the Circum-Pacific Seismic Belt or Ring of Fire.

== Examples ==
- Charlevoix seismic zone (Quebec, Canada)
- New Madrid seismic zone (Midwestern United States)
- South West seismic zone (Western Australia)

== See also ==
- List of fault zones
