= Kyaukkyan Fault =

Strike-slip fault that extends from Myanmar to Thailand

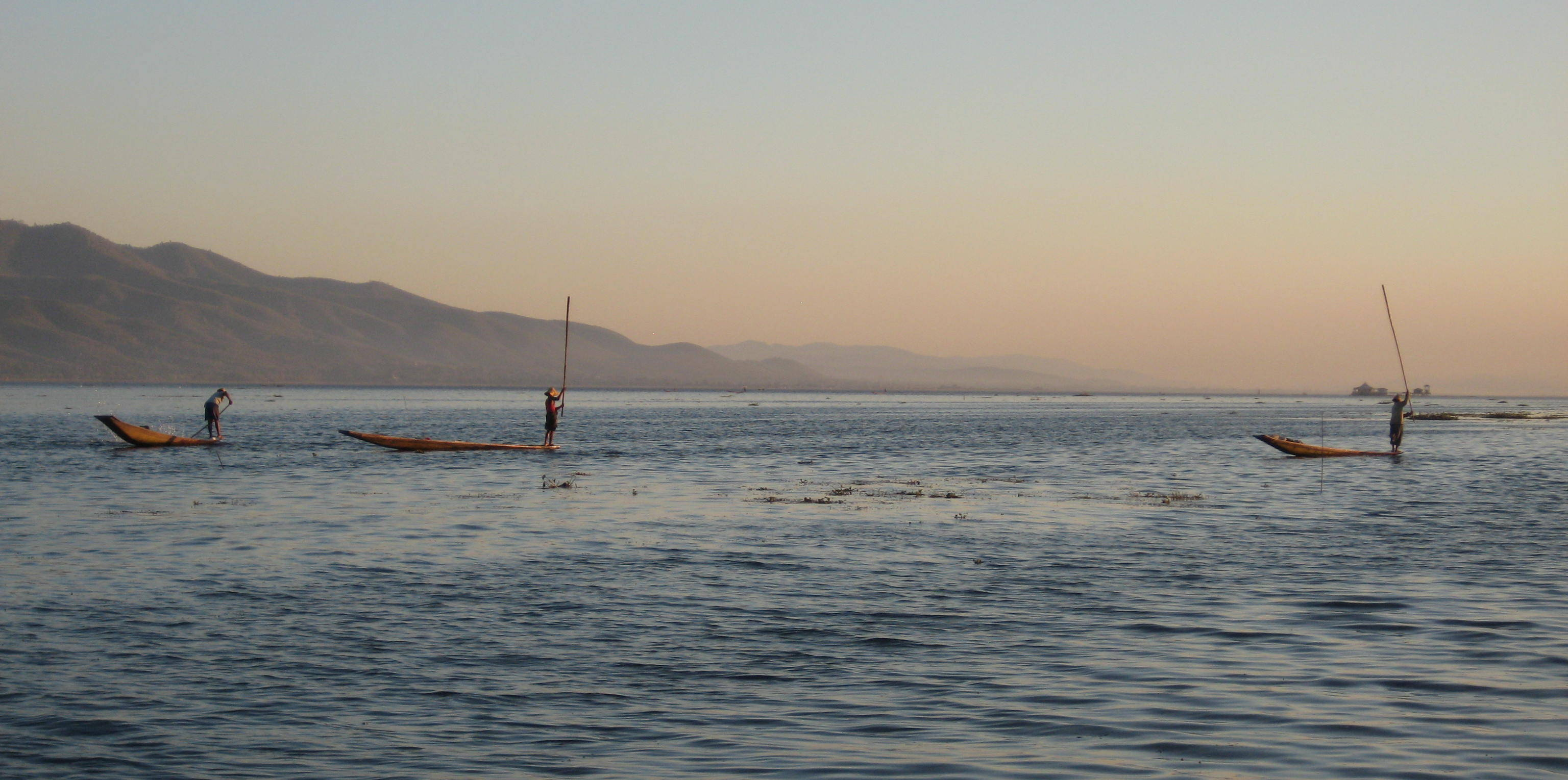
- Extensional fault systems are responsible for the formation of Inle Lake
- Country: Myanmar
- State: Shan

Characteristics
- Length: 500 km (310 mi)
- Strike: north northwest
- Dip: vertical
- Displacement: ~1 mm/yr

Tectonics
- Status: active
- Earthquakes: 1912
- Type: strike-slip fault
- Movement: dextral

The Kyaukkyan Fault Zone is a large complex strike-slip fault that extends for about 510 km from Shan state, Myanmar to Thailand. It was the source of the 1912 Shan state earthquake when it ruptured for a length of 160 km along the northernmost segment. The fault is not very well studied, unlike the Sagaing Fault. The fault runs through the Shan hills nearly parallel to the Sagaing Fault. It is highly segmented, characterized by a broad array of splaying segments and basins, dominated by releasing bends and associated extensional fault systems. The slip rate for this fault is about 1 mm/yr.

== Segments ==
=== Myint Nge segment ===
The Kyaukkyan Fault Zone's northernmost segment runs 160 km just north of Taunggyi and terminates east of Mandalay. It gets its name from the Myint Nge River that is offset by the fault. In 1912, the entire Myint Nge segment ruptured and produced an earthquake of magnitude 7.7.

=== Taunggyi segment ===
This segment is a transtensional basin 50 km wide and 100 km long. It is bordered by the Taunggyi and Pindaya Faults, both normal faults. High fault scarps can be observed; the Pindaya Fault scarp faces east and is about 350 m high while the Taunggyi escarpment reaches 400 m. At Inle Lake, motion of the Taunggyi Fault has resulted in its eastern side is deeper than its west, associated with block tilting.

=== Salween segment ===
The Salween segment gets its namesake from the Salween River that is also offset by the fault by about 5.4 km. The fault makes a bend, like the "Big Bend" of the San Andreas Fault, creating a transtensional basin along the river. At this segment, the Mae Ping Fault connects with the Kayukkyan Fault. The Kyaukkan Fault continue its trace for another 170 km, crossing the Myanmar-Thailand border, terminating north of Bangkok.

== Seismic activity ==
The fault has been largely devoid of significant seismicity, aside from the earthquake of 1912, although the Shan Plateau is seismically active and poses large earthquake risk. Moderate earthquakes were recorded in 1975 and 1985 on the fault. Researchers found two earlier earthquakes along the Kyaukkyan Fault corresponding to 1260 ± 30 BP and 4660 ± 30 BP. The 1988 Yunnan-Shan and 2011 Tarlay earthquakes were the most recent large events in the region. Estimates from researchers for large earthquakes along the fault are M6.8 to 8.4.
