= 1861 Eliki earthquake =

Major Greek earthquake centred near Gulf of Corinth

- Local date: 26 December 1861
- Local time: 08:28
- Magnitude: 6.6–6.7 M_{w}
- Depth: 10 km (6 mi)
- Epicentre: 38.28°N 22.24°E
- Fault: East Eliki Fault
- Type: Normal fault
- Areas affected: Gulf of Corinth, Greece
- Max. intensity: EMS-98 IX (Destructive)
- Tsunami: Maximum run-up 2.1 m

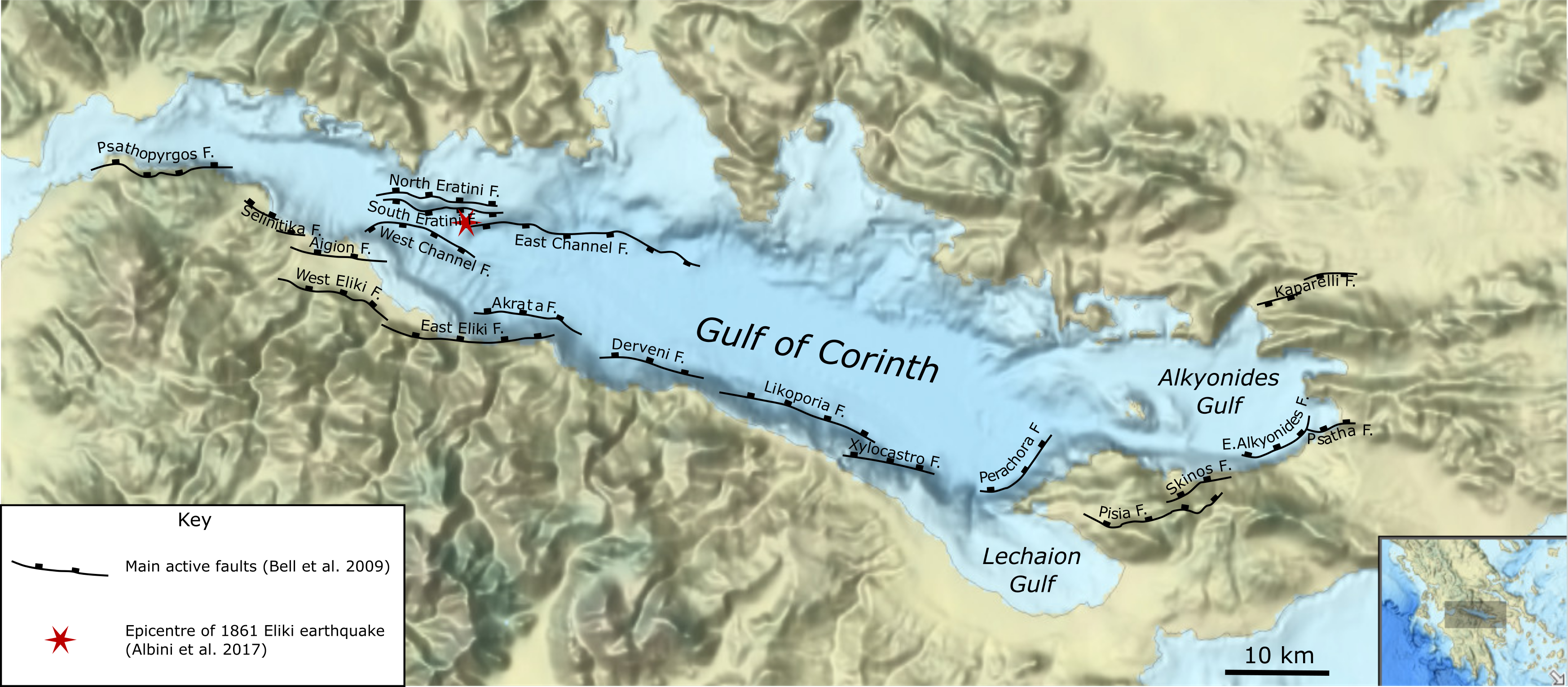
Map of Gulf of Corinth basin showing main active rift faults and epicentre of 1861 earthquake

The southern margin of the Gulf of Corinth was struck by a major earthquake on 26 December 1861 at 08:28 a.m. local time. It had an estimated magnitude in the range 6.6–6.7 M_{w} and a maximum felt intensity of IX (destructive) on the European macroseismic scale (EMS). It caused widespread damage on both sides of the Gulf and led to up to 20 deaths and a further 126 people being injured, 18 of them seriously. A series of tsunami waves were reported, with a maximum run-up of 2.1 m.

== Tectonic setting ==
The Gulf of Corinth is a zone of active rifting caused by the continued southward movement and spreading of the Aegean Sea plate in reaction to subduction of the African plate beneath it. This is a result of rollback affecting the subducting slab, leading to extension in the over-riding plate.

The Gulf of Corinth rift is one of the fastest known zones of active extension in the world, with estimated extension rates of 10–15 mm per year. Most of the rift is dominated by large extensional faults throwing down to the north, close to the current southern shore, although there are significant active south-dipping faults within the Gulf and along its northern side. In the western part of the Gulf, the main south-dipping faults are the Psathopyrgos, Selinitika, Aigion, Eliki and Akrata faults. The Eliki Fault is generally divided into two segments, the West and East Eliki faults. The Gulf of Corinth is an area of high seismicity, with many historical destructive earthquakes recorded, such as the 1995 Aigio earthquake. The East Eliki Fault is thought to have ruptured during an earthquake in 373 BC, destroying the ancient city of Helike.

== Earthquake ==
The magnitude of this earthquake has been estimated using the distribution of seismic intensities from 72 locations for which sufficient information about the damage sustained is available. The SISCOR approach used, based on the method developed by Bakun and Wentworth in 1997, gave an epicentral location in the middle of the Gulf, consistent with the observed tsunami. The magnitude was estimated in the range 6.6–6.7 M_{w}, regardless of the approach adopted.

A possible surface rupture was reported soon after the earthquake by Johann Friedrich Julius Schmidt, then the director of the National Observatory of Athens. He mapped out a 12–13 km long fissure that has been interpreted as surface rupture, although it has also been suggested that the fissure may represent the effects of lateral spreading during the earthquake.

== Tsunami ==
Up to five tsunami waves were reported affecting both the northern and southern coasts of the Gulf of Corinth. Run-ups of about 2 m were reported generally along the northern coast accompanied by inundation of 15–60 m. The tsunami led to significant damage to both merchant vessels and rowing boats in the Gulf of Itea.

== See also ==
- List of earthquakes in Greece
