= Lyttelton Timeball Station =

Landmark in Lyttelton, New Zealand

Coordinates: 43.606449°S 172.726765°E

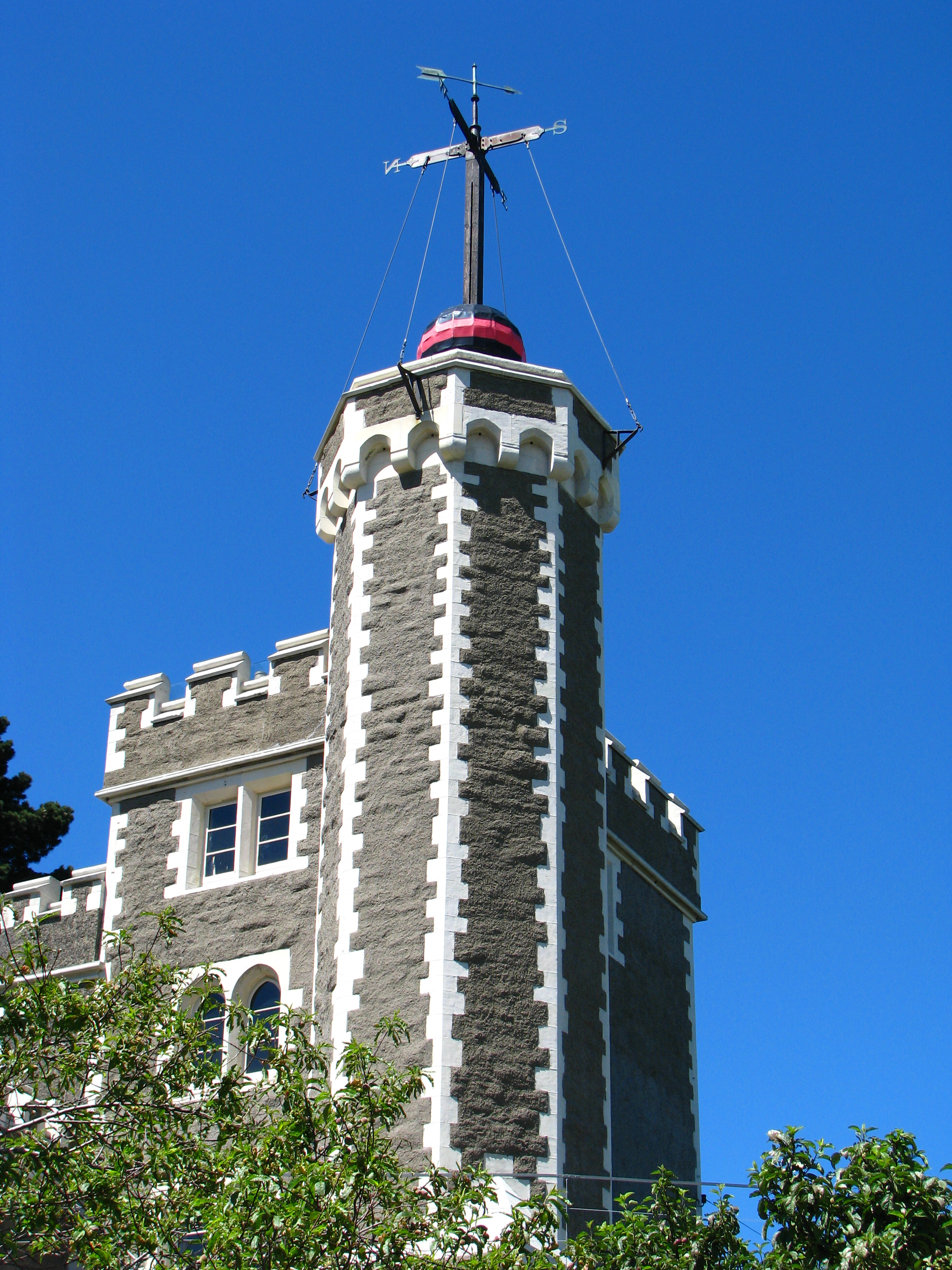
Lyttelton Timeball Station in November 2009

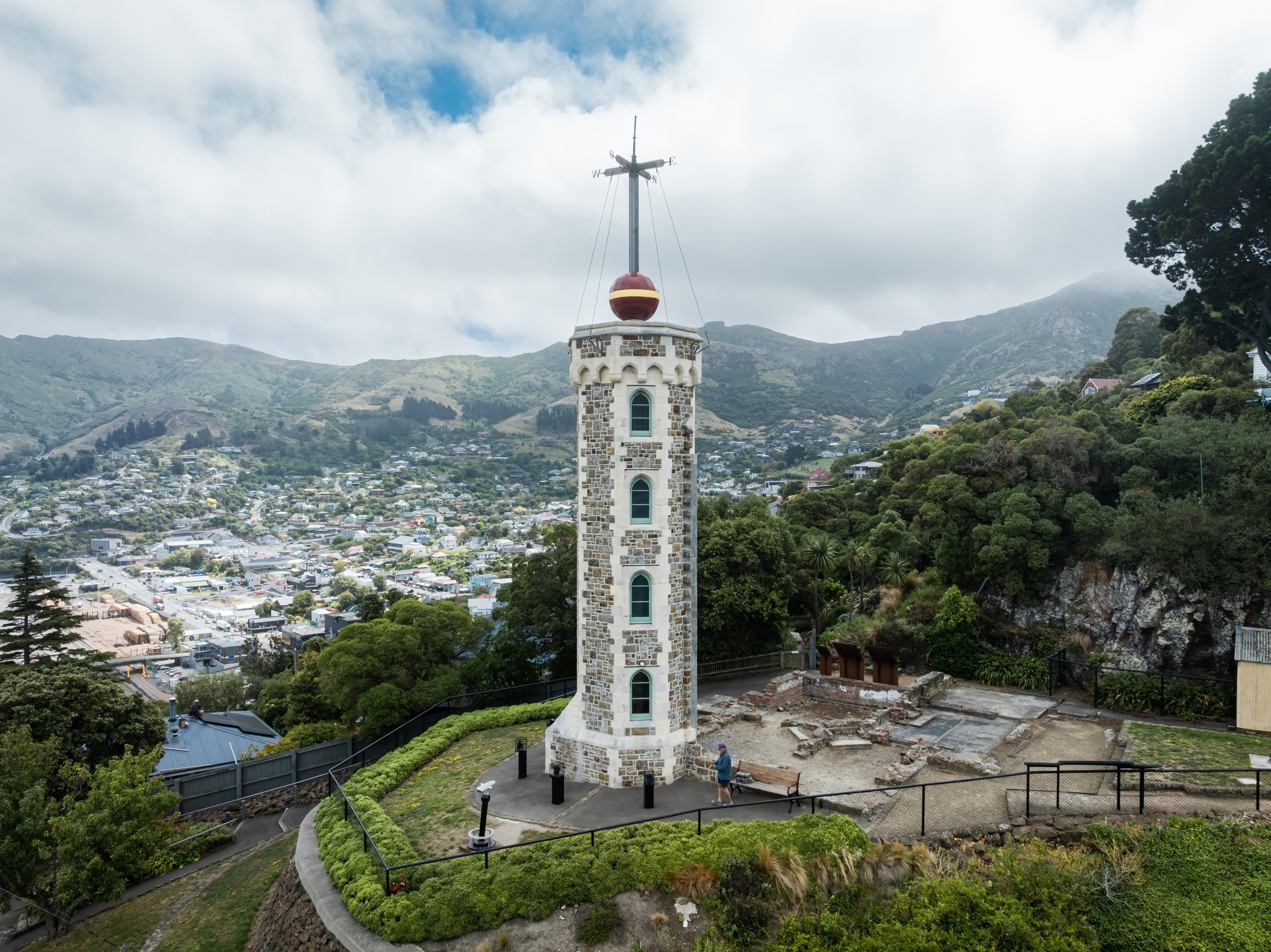
The rebuilt Lyttelton Timeball Station in 2025

The Lyttelton Timeball Station is a heritage-registered time ball station and prominent local landmark in Lyttelton, New Zealand. The original station, built in 1876, was significantly damaged by a series of earthquakes and aftershocks in 2010 and 2011, and finally collapsed on 13 June 2011 after a magnitude 6.4 aftershock. The tower was partially reconstructed, reopening in November 2018.

== Context ==
A time ball is a large painted wooden or metal ball that drops at a predetermined time, principally to enable sailors to check their marine chronometers from their boats offshore. While latitude has long been easily determined first using an astrolabe and later a sextant, timekeeping is one way of enabling mariners to determine their longitude at sea. The key to this was accuracy, as an error of four seconds translates into 6,000 feet (1,800 m) of actual distance at the equator, and 3,000 feet (910 m) at latitude 60 degrees.

== History ==
John Thomas Peacock, a businessman and politician, first came to Lyttelton in 1844. He built the first substantial wharf and was well established by the time large numbers of settlers started arriving six years later with the First Four Ships. Peacock first promoted the erection of a time ball station in Lyttelton as a Member of the House of Representatives, but his suggestion was rejected. He was also a Member of the Canterbury Provincial Council, and his suggestion in 1870 for a Lyttelton time ball found support. It was the third time ball in New Zealand, after Wellington (1864) and Dunedin (1868).

The station, which was designed by local architect Thomas Cane, was completed in 1876. The castle-like complex initially comprised an octagonal tower supporting the time ball and a three-storey building which provided accommodation, work areas as well as housing the clock. The materials used were local scoria and contrasting lighter coloured Oamaru stone. Additions were made to the building between 1877 and 1878 and again in 1912. The astronomical clock originated from Britain and the time ball was supplied by Siemens Brothers of Germany.

In 1877 the Lyttelton Harbour Board took over the management of the timeball station from the Canterbury Provincial Council. At this time the first timeball keeper, Alexander Joyce, moved into the timeball station residence with his family.

In addition to the time ball, there was a flag signalling system. This was used to send messages to ships, and information about the arrival of ships to the town. This system pre-dated the time ball, and continued to operate after the time ball ceased functioning on 31 December 1934. The flag signalling ended in 1941, and the army took over the time ball station. Following World War II, the building was used by the Harbour Board but had fallen empty by the 1960s.

In 1969, the Lyttelton Maritime Association was formed to restore the time ball station. Restoration work began in 1975, under the auspices of the Historic Places Trust and the Ministry of Works and Development.

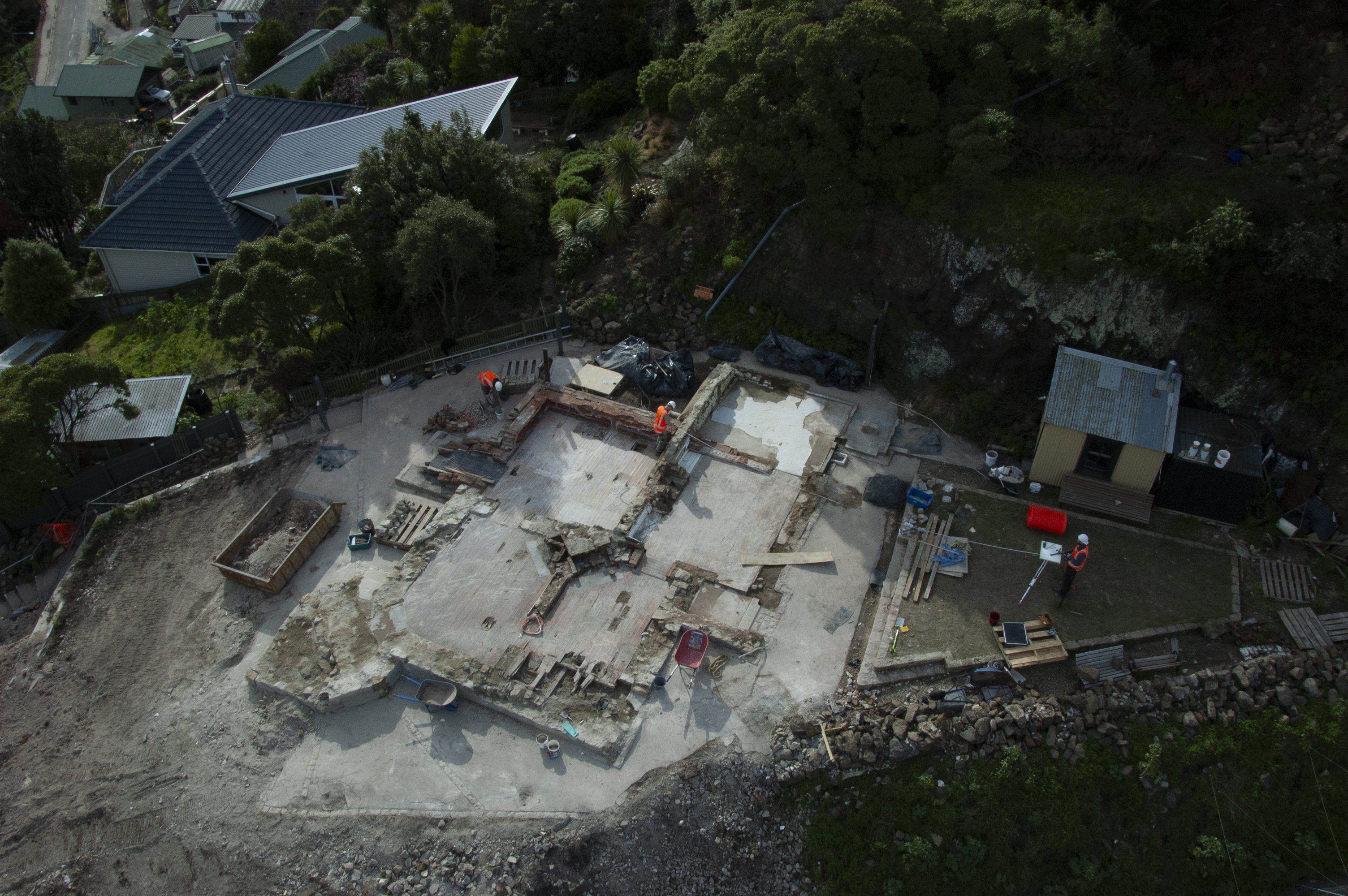
Foundations of the Timeball Station, during archaeological recording following demolition

The tower was damaged during the 2010 Canterbury earthquake and the operation of the time ball stopped. The buildings were significantly damaged during the February 2011 Christchurch earthquake. The New Zealand Historic Places Trust decided that it would be dismantled after engineering advice indicated that the building could not be saved due to public safety concerns, though they hoped to salvage the time ball mechanism and were investigating whether reconstruction was a viable option. The tower collapsed during an aftershock on 13 June 2011.

The deconstruction of the time ball station took place under an archaeological authority issued by New Zealand Historic Places Trust. Under this authority, all elements of the time ball station were recorded as they were removed from the building and associated rubble. Following the deconstruction of the building, its foundations were exposed. These were removed when the time ball tower was rebuilt.

On 25 May 2013, it was announced that the tower and ball would be restored, and that funds were to be sought from the community to rebuild the rest of the station.

The tower rebuild took place between July 2017 and November 2018, and the area has since reopened to the public.

== Skippy ==
Between 2003 and 2009, a Jack Russell Terrier cross, Skippy, would travel to the timeball station to bark at it until the timeball would drop at 1pm. A sculpture of Skippy was unveiled at the site in 2019.

== Heritage listing ==
On 7 April 1983, the building was registered as a Category I heritage item, with the registration number being 43. Including Lyttelton, there were only five time ball stations in working order worldwide at the time, and the one in Lyttelton was the only one remaining in New Zealand.

The heritage listing was withdrawn following the station's destruction in the Canterbury earthquakes.

== See also ==
- List of oldest buildings in Christchurch
