= West Andaman Fault =

West Andaman Fault is a major north–south trending strike-slip fault zone that forms the boundary between the forearc, developed above the highly oblique subduction zone between the Indian plate and the Burma plate, and the Andaman Sea. The Andaman Sea is a back-arc basin developed as a pull-apart between the right-lateral strike-slip Sagaing and West Andaman faults. Different segments of the fault ruptured in both foreshocks and aftershocks surrounding the 2004 Indian Ocean earthquake and tsunami event. The northern end is thought to connect to the Sagaing Fault and the southern end to the Great Sumatran fault. The two magnitude 8 events in 2004 and 2005, are located on either side of West Andaman Fault indicate that fault played a critical role in controlling the rupture pattern of both the 2004 and 2005 earthquakes.
