= Corral Canyon =

Valley in California, U.S.

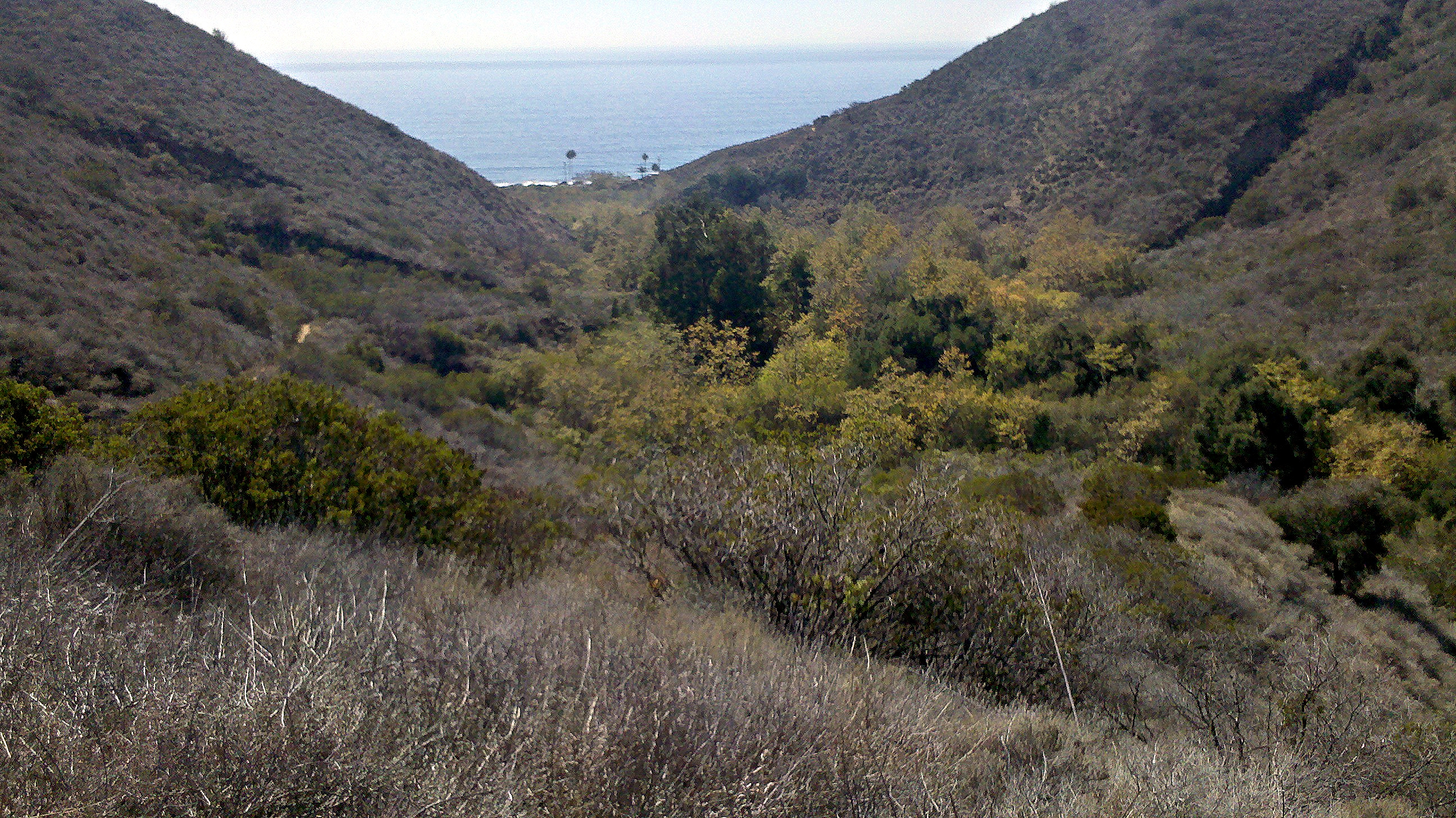
- Corral Canyon looking south towards the Pacific Ocean

- Location within California

Geography
- Location: Santa Monica Mountains
- Country: United States
- State: California
- Region: Los Angeles County
- Coordinates: 34°02′05″N 118°44′5″W
- Interactive map of Corral Canyon

The Corral Canyon is a valley in Los Angeles County, California, United States in the Santa Monica Mountains, it slopes down to the diverse terrain of the Malibu coast.

Corral Canyon State Park protects the southern portion of the valley and is managed and operated by the Mountains Recreation and Conservation Authority in partnership with the Santa Monica Mountains Conservancy. A loop trail climbs the slope of the valley within the park and loops back to the start. The trail starts at a small parking area on Pacific Coast Highway that runs along a narrow coastal terrace.
