= Chixoy-Polochic Fault =

Fault zone in Guatemala and Mexico

Coordinates: 15°28′N 89°22′W

The Chixoy-Polochic Fault, also known as Cuilco-Chixoy-Polochic Fault, is a major fault zone in Guatemala and southeast Mexico. It runs in a light arc from the east coast of Guatemala to Chiapas, following the deep valleys of the Polochic River, Chixoy River and Cuilco River.

== Extent, slip rate and total displacement ==
The Chixoy-Polochic Fault is a large, dominantly strike-slip, left-lateral fault that runs largely parallel to the Motagua Fault situated some 45 km to its south. Both fault zones are onshore extensions of the Bartlett Deep, or Cayman Trench of the Caribbean Sea, which marks the tectonic boundary between the Caribbean plate and the North American plate. Both faults connect at sea west of the Guatemalan coast. To the west, the Polochic fault may branch onto the Tonala fault of western Chiapas. It does not continue at sea across the Pacific coastal plain and marine shelf.

The Chixoy-Polochic fault has total displacement of 125 km, well constrained by the offset of Paleocene or Eocene laramide folds and thrusts. Fault velocity has been estimated at 4.8 ± 2.3 mm/y over the past 10 ky, 2.5–3.3 mm/y over the last 7–10 Myr, and less than 5 mm/y during the current interseismic cycle.

== Seismicity ==
While recent seismic activity is more prominent in the Motagua fault, some studies suggest the Chixoy-Polochic Fault is still capable of producing major earthquakes. The magnitude 7.5–7.8 M_{w} 1816 Guatemala earthquake of western Guatemala has been ascribed to the Polochic Fault, although this has been disputed. Most recent recorded fault activity includes at least for slip events between 17 ka and 13 ka BP, and aseismic surface rupture over some of the past 5 centuries. One or several intermediate to large earthquakes between 850 CE and 1,400 CE, including a cluster of 4 earthquakes over 60 years during the Classic Maya collapse. The fault display a 5 km to 10 km deep zone of microseismicity which may represent a locked zone. Only ≤ 5.6 M_{w} earthquakes have occurred on the fault since the beginning of regional instrumental records (1920 CE).
