= Hsum Hsai =

- Location of in Burma
- Coordinates: 22°16′N 96°37′E
- Country: Burma
- State: Shan State
- District: Kyaukme District
- Township: Nawnghkio
- Time zone: UTC+6.30 (MST)

Hsum Hsai (Burmese: ဆမ္မဆယ်) is a village in the Nawnghkio Township, in northern Shan State of Myanmar, located approximately 60 km north-east of Mandalay. The town is under the control of the Ta'ang National Liberation Army.
