= Walker Lane =

Tectonic deformation zone in the western United States

Walker Lane Walker Lane Deformation Zone
- Shear zone
- Location: California, Nevada

Dimensions
  - Length: 500 mi (800 km)

The Walker Lane includes Death Valley, the Owens Valley, Pyramid Lake, & Walker Lake.

The Walker Lane is a geologic trough roughly aligned with the California/Nevada border southward to where Death Valley intersects the Garlock Fault, a major left lateral, or sinistral, strike-slip fault. The north-northwest end of the Walker Lane is between Pyramid Lake in Nevada and California's Lassen Peak where the Honey Lake Fault Zone, the Warm Springs Valley Fault, and the Pyramid Lake Fault Zone meet the transverse tectonic zone forming the southern boundary of the Modoc Plateau and Columbia Plateau provinces. The Walker Lane takes up 15 to 25 percent of the boundary motion between the Pacific plate and the North American plate, the other 75 percent being taken up by the San Andreas Fault system to the west. The Walker Lane may represent an incipient major transform fault zone which could replace the San Andreas as the plate boundary in the future.

The Walker Lane deformation belt also accommodates nearly 12 mm/yr of dextral shear between the Sierra Nevada–Great Valley Block and North America. The belt is characterized by the northwest-striking trans-current faults and co-evolutionary dip-slip faults formed as result of a spatially segregated displacement field.

== Eastern California shear zone ==
The eastern California shear zone is the portion of the Walker Lane that extends south from Owens Valley, and continues across and south of the Garlock Fault, across the Mojave Desert to the San Andreas Fault. Several magnitude 7+ earthquakes have occurred along the eastern California shear zone, including the 1992 Landers earthquake, 1999 Hector Mine earthquake, the 2019 Ridgecrest earthquakes sequence, as well as the powerful 1872 Owens Valley earthquake in the Owens Valley.
