= John Coggin Brown =

British geologist

John Coggin Brown OBE (October 1884 – 23 June 1962) was a British geologist who worked in the Geological Survey of India. He worked in British India and Burma and wrote several major books on the mineral resources of region. During his travels across the region, he also collected zoological specimens for the Zoological Survey of India.

Brown was born in West Auckland, Durham to George Richard and Eliza Bedlington. After studies at the King James I school he went to Armstrong College and graduated in 1904 and joined the Geological Survey of India as an assistant superintendent. His work took him to the western Himalayas, Shan States and Yunnan. He received a DSc in 1911. In 1913 he served as a geologist on the Abor Expeditionary Force for which he receive an India General Service Medal. He became a curator at the museum and also lectured in Calcutta at the Presidency College. He served as inspector of mines in Burma from 1918, surveying tungsten mines in Tavoy. From 1919 to 1921 he was posted as mineral advisor in London at the Imperial Mineral Resources Bureau. For his wartime work he was made an OBE.
