= 1816 Guatemala earthquake =

- Location within Guatemala
- UTC time: 1816-07-22 15:30
- Local date: July 22, 1816
- Local time: 09:30
- Magnitude: ~7.5 M_{w} (est.)
- Depth: 30.0 km (18.6 mi)
- Epicenter: 15.5°N 91.5°W
- Areas affected: Guatemala
- Max. intensity: MMI IX (Violent)
- Casualties: 23 killed

The 1816 Guatemala earthquake occurred at 15:30 UTC on 22 July. It had an estimated magnitude of 7.5 to 7.75 on the M_{w} and a maximum perceived intensity of IX (Violent) on the Mercalli intensity scale. The quake, at a depth of 30.0 km (18.6 mi), was caused by movement on the Chixoy-Polochic Fault. The area affected by shaking up to intensity VII (Very strong) was at least 13,000 km^{2}. At least 23 deaths were reported. The discovery of this earthquake 175 years after it occurred was based on study of historical documents, and is notable for showing that this portion of Guatemala, previously believed by many planners to be of low seismic risk, has experienced, and is at further risk of, very large earthquakes.

== See also ==
- List of earthquakes in Guatemala
- List of historical earthquakes
