= Honey Lake Fault Zone =

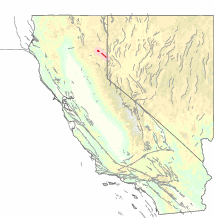
The Honey Lake Fault Zone in northeastern California

The Honey Lake Fault Zone is a right lateral-moving (dextral) geologic fault extending through northwestern Nevada and northeastern California. It is considered an integral part of the Walker Lane.

A 50 km (31 mi) zone of disturbed landforms reveals the fault's presence on the surface. The geological evidence shows at least four surface-faulting earthquakes have occurred in the late Holocene era.
