= Port Hills Fault =

Seismic fault in New Zealand

The Port Hills Fault is an inferred active seismic fault believed to be located beneath the Port Hills near Christchurch, on the east coast of New Zealand's South Island.

== Christchurch earthquake ==
A magnitude 6.3 earthquake occurred on the Port Hills Fault at 12:51 pm on 22 February 2011 local time (23:51 21 February UTC), causing widespread damage and fatalities. The earthquake was centred 2 kilometres (1.2 mi) west of the town of Lyttelton, and 10 kilometres (6 mi) south-east of the centre of Christchurch, New Zealand's second-most populous city. It followed nearly six months after the 7.1 magnitude 2010 Canterbury earthquake that caused significant damage to the region but no direct fatalities.
