= Extensional fault =

Fault caused by stretching of the Earth's crust

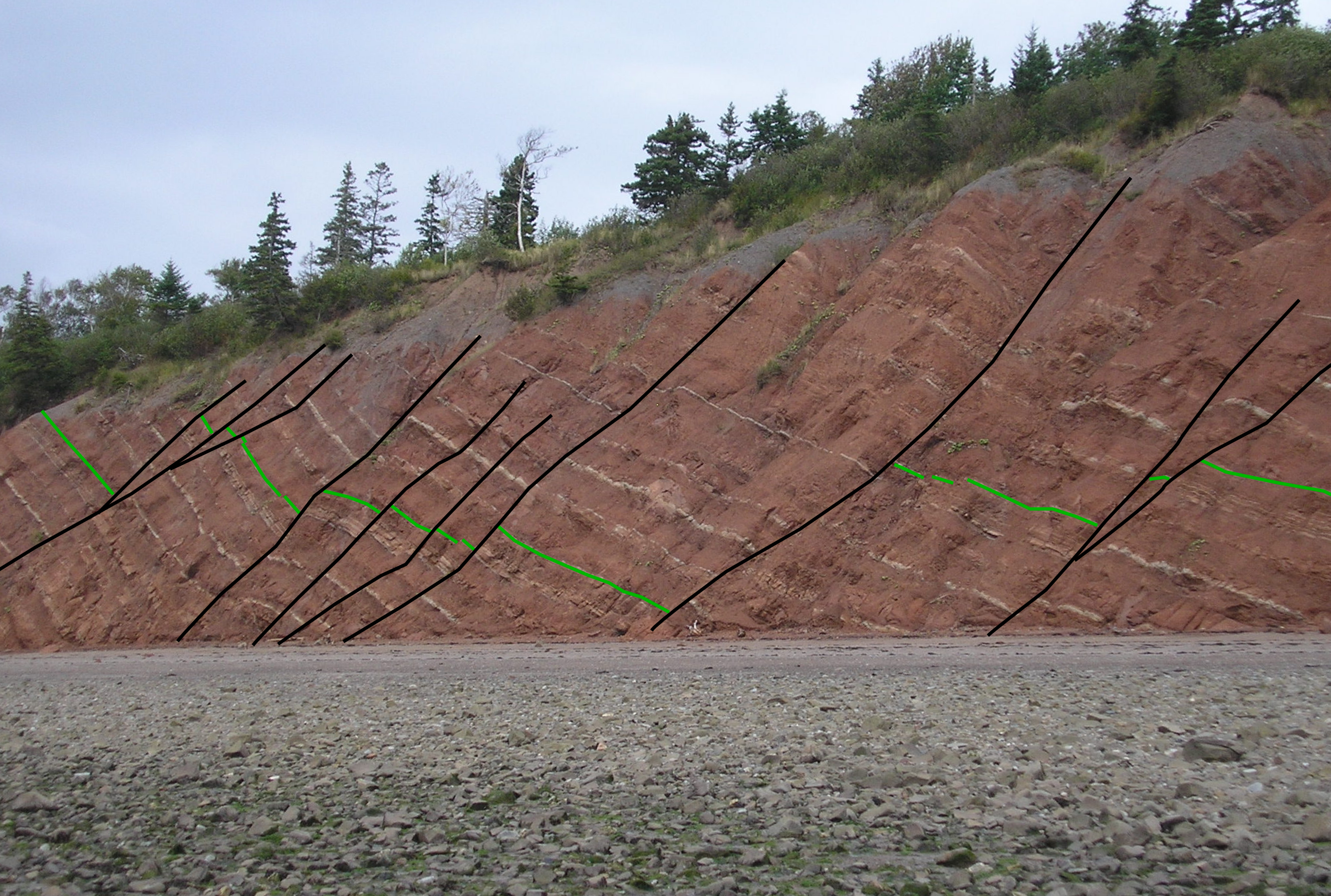
Array of extensional faults cutting Triassic to Lower Jurassic Blomidon Formation rocks, near Clarke Head, Minas Basin North Shore, Nova Scotia, position of faults highlighted in black, marker bed highlighted in green

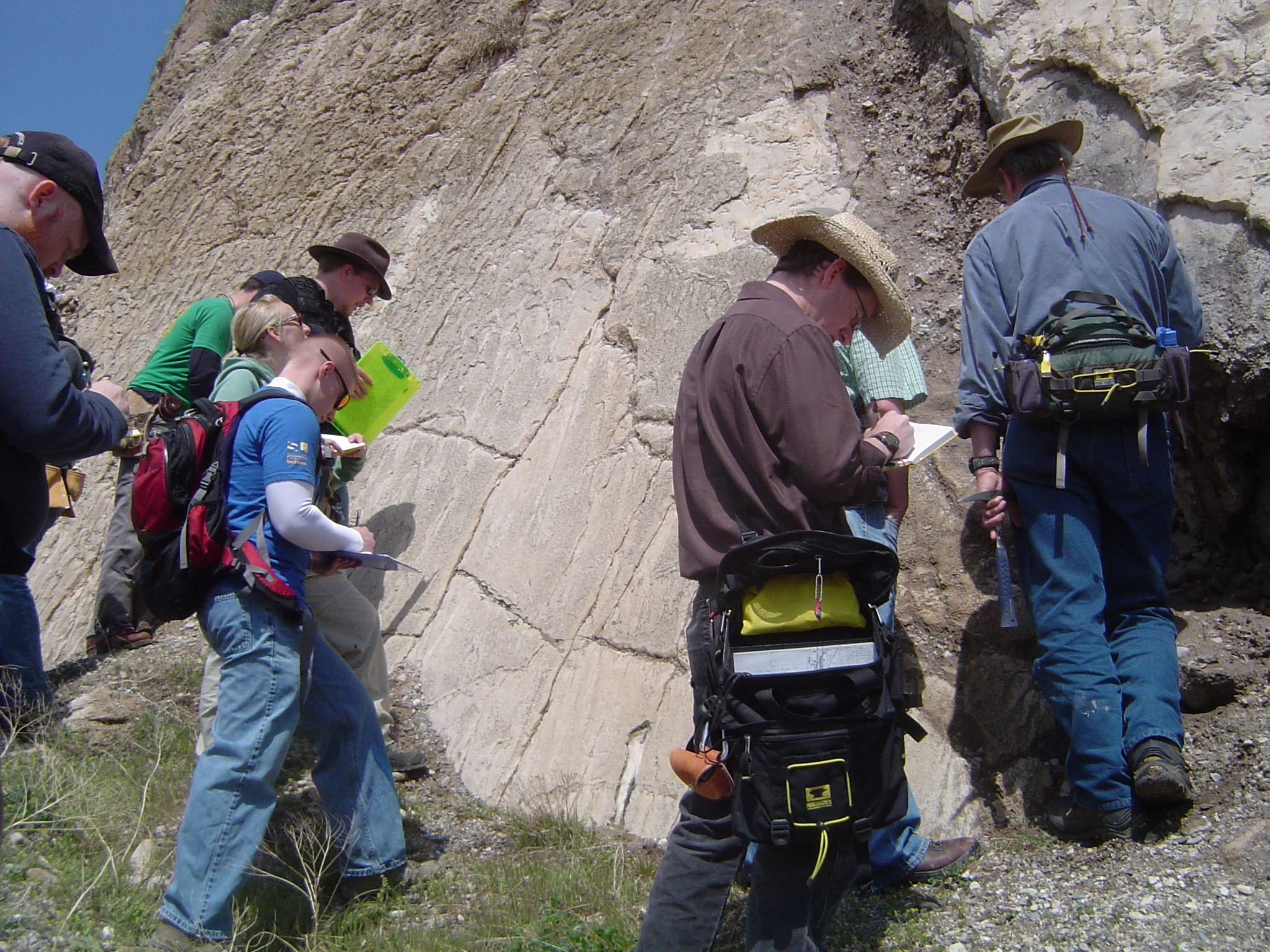
Students examine an extensional fault, up close

An extensional fault is a fault caused by stretching of the Earth's crust. Stretching reduces the thickness and horizontally extends portions of the crust and/or lithosphere. In most cases such a fault is also a normal fault, but may create a shallower dip usually associated with a thrust fault. Extensional faults are generally planar. If the stress field is oriented with the maximum stress perpendicular to the Earth's surface, extensional faults will create an initial dip of the associated beds of about 60° from the horizontal. The faults will typically extend down to the base of the seismogenic layer. As crustal stretching continues, the faults will rotate, resulting in steeply-dipping fault blocks between them.

== See also ==
- Extensional tectonics
- Graben
