= Central America =

Subregion of North America

- Area: 523,780 km^{2} (202,230 sq mi)
- Population: ▲52,700,000 (2023)
- Population density: 100.6/km^{2} (260.6/sq mi) (2023)
- GDP (PPP): $738.8 billion (2023)
- GDP (nominal): $362.62 billion (exchange rate) (2023)
- GDP per capita: $6,880 (exchange rate) (2023) $14,019 (PPP) (2023)
- Ethnic groups: Mestizo; Indigenous; European; Garifuna; Mulatto; African
- Religions: 76.5% Christianity; 52.3% Catholicism; 23.2% Protestantism; 1.0% other Christian; 17.6% No religion; 2.5% Folk religions; 1.3% Others
- Demonym: Central American (Note: Spanish: centroamericano)
- Countries: 7 (Note: The United Nations geoscheme includes Mexico in Central America, but the country is not universally considered to be a part of Central America among other geographical societies.): Belize; Costa Rica; El Salvador; Guatemala; Honduras; Nicaragua; Panama
- Dependencies: External (1): Clipperton Island (Note: One of the Central American Pacific Islands.) (France); Internal (2): Valle del Cauca, Malpelo Island (Colombia); Archipelago of San Andrés, Providencia and Santa Catalina (Note: Comprising two remote island groups off the coast of Central America.) (Colombia); Disputed (2): Bajo Nuevo Bank (Note: Administered by Colombia, claimed by Jamaica and the United States.); Serranilla Bank (Note: Administered by Colombia, claimed by Honduras, Jamaica, and the United States.)
- Languages: Spanish; English; Mayan; Miskito; Garifuna; Kriol; Bay Island Creole; Mekatelyu; Honduran and Nicaraguan Miskito Creole; Others
- Time zone: UTC−06:00 to UTC−05:00
- Largest cities: Largest cities: Guatemala City; San Salvador; Managua; Tegucigalpa; Panama City; San Pedro Sula; San José; San Miguelito; Santa Ana; San Miguel
- UN M49 codes: 013 – Central America; 419 003 – North America Latin America and the Caribbean; 019 – Americas; 001 – World

Central America (Note: Spanish: América Central [aˈmeɾika senˈtɾal] or Centroamérica [sentɾoaˈmeɾika]) is a subregion of North America. Its political boundaries are defined as bordering Mexico to the north, Colombia to the southeast, the Caribbean to the east, and the Pacific Ocean to the southwest. Central America is usually defined as consisting of seven countries: Belize, Costa Rica, El Salvador, Guatemala, Honduras, Nicaragua, Panama and, in specialized contexts, including Mexico. Within Central America is the Mesoamerican biodiversity hotspot, which extends from southern Mexico to southeastern Panama. Due to the presence of several active geologic faults and the Central America Volcanic Arc, seismic activity in the region, such as volcanic eruptions and earthquakes, is high, which has caused death, injury, and property damage.

Central America includes portions of two recognized cultural areas: the Isthmo-Colombian cultural area, which encompasses modern Panama, Costa Rica, and the eastern portions of Nicaragua and Honduras, along with regions to the east; and the Mesoamerican cultural area, encompassing Guatemala, Belize, El Salvador, and the western portions of Honduras and Nicaragua, along with the southern part of Mexico. Before Christopher Columbus's voyages to the Americas, hundreds of indigenous groups lived in these areas. From 1502 onward, Spain began its colonization. From 1609 to 1821, most Central American territories (except for what became Belize and Panama and including the modern Mexican state of Chiapas) were governed by the viceroyalty of New Spain from Mexico City as the Captaincy General of Guatemala. On 24 August 1821, Spanish Viceroy Juan de O'Donojú signed the Treaty of Córdoba, which established New Spain's independence and autonomy from mainland Spain. On 15 September, the Act of Independence of Central America was enacted to announce Central America's separation from the Spanish Empire. Some of New Spain's provinces in the Central American region were invaded and annexed to the First Mexican Empire, but in 1823 they seceded from Mexico to form the Federal Republic of Central America.

In 1838, Costa Rica, Guatemala, Honduras, and Nicaragua became the first of Central America's states to become independent countries, followed by El Salvador in 1841, Panama in 1903, and Belize in 1981. Despite the dissolution of the Federal Republic of Central America, the five remaining countries, save for Panama and Belize, all preserved and maintained a Central American identity.

The Spanish-speaking countries officially include both North America and South America as a single continent, América, which is split into four subregions: Central America, the Caribbean, North America (Mexico and Northern America), and South America.

== Definitions ==
"Central America" means different things, depending on the context:

- The United Nations geoscheme for the Americas defines Central America as all states of mainland North America south of the United States, including Mexico, but historically and politically Mexico is considered North American.
- Middle America is usually thought to comprise Mexico in the north and the seven states of Central America in the south, as well as the Caribbean in the east. Colombia and Venezuela of Caribbean South America are sometimes included in this subregion. The Caribbean is occasionally excluded from this subregion while The Guianas are infrequently included. According to one source, the term "Central America" was used as a synonym for "Middle America" at least as recently as 1962.
- In Spanish-speaking countries, the Americas are considered a single continent (América), and Central America is not considered part of North America, but a subregion of the continent comprising the seven countries south of Mexico and north of Colombia.
- For the people in Costa Rica, El Salvador, Guatemala, Honduras, and Nicaragua, formerly parts of the Federal Republic of Central America, there is a distinction between the Spanish language terms "América Central" and "Centroamérica". Both can be translated into English as "Central America", but "América Central" generally refers to the geographical area of the seven countries between Mexico and Colombia while "Centroamérica" refers to the former members of the Federation, emphasizing the shared culture and history of the region.
- In Portuguese as a rule and occasionally in Spanish and other languages, the entirety of the Antilles is often included in the definition of Central America. Indeed, the Dominican Republic is a full member of the Central American Integration System.

== History ==
Central America was formed more than 3 million years ago, as part of the Isthmus of Panama, when its portion of land connected each side of water.

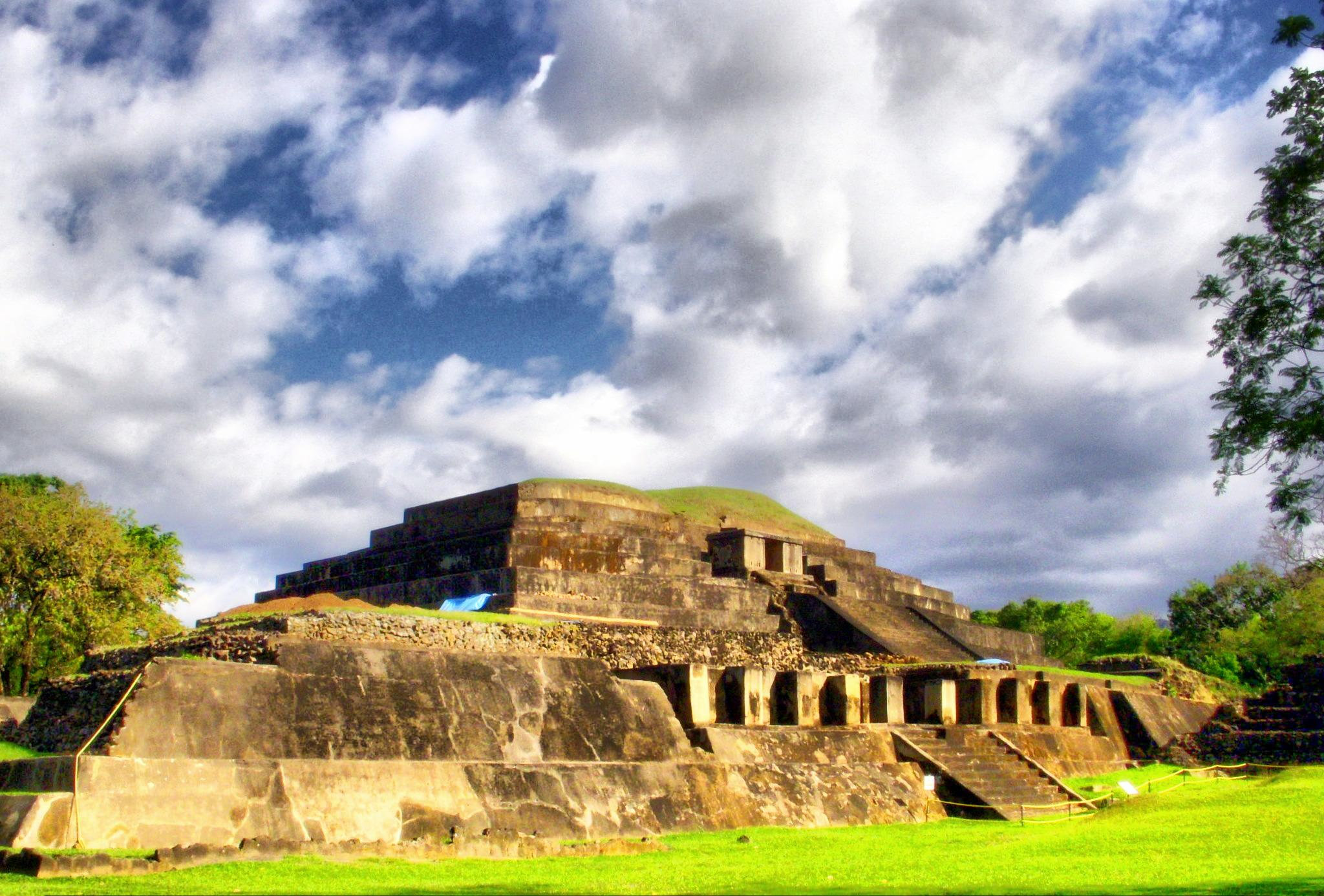
Tazumal, El Salvador

In the Pre-Columbian era, the northern areas of Central America were inhabited by the indigenous peoples of Mesoamerica. Most notable among these were the Mayans, who had built numerous cities throughout the region, and the Aztecs, who had created a vast empire. The pre-Columbian cultures of eastern Honduras, Caribbean Nicaragua, most of Costa Rica and Panama were predominantly speakers of the Chibchan languages at the time of European contact and are considered by some culturally different and grouped in the Isthmo-Colombian Area.

Following the Spanish expedition of Christopher Columbus's voyages to the Americas, the Spanish sent many expeditions to the region, and they began their conquest of Maya territory in 1523. Soon after the conquest of the Aztec Empire, Spanish conquistador Pedro de Alvarado commenced the conquest of northern Central America for the Spanish Empire. Beginning with his arrival in Soconusco in 1523, Alvarado's forces systematically conquered and subjugated most of the major Maya kingdoms, including the K'iche', Tz'utujil, Pipil, and the Kaqchikel. By 1528, the conquest of Guatemala was nearly complete, with only the Petén Basin remaining outside the Spanish sphere of influence. The last independent Maya kingdoms – the Kowoj and the Itza people – were finally defeated in 1697, as part of the Spanish conquest of Petén.

In 1538, Spain established the Real Audiencia of Panama, which had jurisdiction over all land from the Strait of Magellan to the Gulf of Fonseca. This entity was dissolved in 1543, and most of the territory within Central America then fell under the jurisdiction of the Audiencia Real de Guatemala. This area included the current territories of Costa Rica, El Salvador, Guatemala, Honduras, Nicaragua, and the Mexican state of Chiapas, but excluded the lands that would become Belize and Panama. The president of the Audiencia, which had its seat in Antigua Guatemala, was the governor of the entire area. In 1609 the area became a captaincy general and the governor was also granted the title of captain general. The Captaincy General of Guatemala encompassed most of Central America, with the exception of present-day Belize and Panama.

=== Slavery ===
Between the 16th and 19th centuries, many enslaved Africans were transported to Central America and used for agriculture, mining, and domestic labor. The exact date of the enslaved African arrival to Central America is difficult to determine. There are many records that establish Spanish requests to travel with enslaved Africans to Guatemala from 1530-1532. Many of the enslaved Africans that arrived in Central American ports were transported through land or boats. Due to the nature of their captures it is unclear as to exactly where they came from, but assumed to be from West Central Africa as most ships departed from there. After their departure most enslaved Africans arrived either in Guatemala or Honduras.

Santiago de Guatemala was established in 1541 and became one of the most important trading posts due to its position between the Valley of Panchoy. Santiago's position was a great way to raise Spanish economic and political positions serving as the seat of the Audiencia de Guatemala and outranking other Spanish settlements. Enslaved Africans started arriving through Santiago in 1543, but smaller shipments had previously been made to Honduras through the port of Trujillo.

Arriving in small groups, enslaved Africans were bought based on gender and skill. Three categories were used to describe them: Bozal; which meant they had just arrived and had little knowledge of the Spanish language; Ladino, someone fluent in Spanish; and Criollo, which was someone who had been born outside of Africa. Spanish fluency was often valued more, but if the enslaved African was newly arrived they were also bought and taught different forms of labor in order to resell for a higher price.

Enslaved people in central America were made up of both Indigenous people and recently arrived Africans. In many instances enslaved Africans were used as overseers of the work being done by the enslaved indigenous people. More and more African slaves arrived in Central America due to the fact that many enslaved people were getting sick.

The enslaved Africans who arrived in Central America were for many different forms of labor, such as mining in Honduras and Nicaragua. They timber in Belize, sugar in Guatemala, indigo plantations in El Salvador. Although El Salvador was also known for having cacao, Costa Rica's booming cacao plantations led to the arrival of many enslaved people through Panama.

Enslaved Africans were able to gain their freedom in 1824, but prior to that there were many different actions taken by enslaved people to earn their freedom earlier. During the early conquest of Central America an enslaved man named Juan Bardales was granted his freedom and received a pension after participating in the conquest of Panama and Honduras. This allowed for many other enslaved people to gain their freedom. Another form would be through marriage. Although not always granted freedom for the enslaved person getting married, the child would be free.

The Captaincy General of Guatemala lasted for more than two centuries, but began to fray after a rebellion in 1811 which began in the Intendancy of San Salvador. The Captaincy General formally ended on 15 September 1821, with the signing of the Act of Independence of Central America. Mexican independence was achieved at virtually the same time with the signing of the Treaty of Córdoba and the Declaration of Independence of the Mexican Empire, and the entire region was fully independent from Spanish authority by 28 September 1821.

From its independence from Spain in 1821 until 1823, the former Captaincy General remained intact as part of the short-lived First Mexican Empire. When Agustín de Iturbide abdicated as emperor of Mexico on 19 March 1823, Central America again became independent. On 1 July 1823, the Congress of Central America peacefully seceded from Mexico and declared absolute independence from all foreign nations, and the region formed the Federal Republic of Central America.

The historic military flag of the United Provinces of Central America with the national motto (God. Union. Liberty.) and the National Battalion initials (B.N.) in golden amber color

The Federal Republic of Central America, initially known as the United Provinces of Central America, was a sovereign state that existed from 1823 to 1840. It was composed of five states: Guatemala, Honduras, El Salvador, Nicaragua, and Costa Rica. The federation was established after these regions declared independence from Spain in 1821 and briefly joined the Mexican Empire before breaking away to form their own union. The republic adopted a constitution in 1824, which was inspired by the federal system of the United States. It provided for a federal capital, initially located in Guatemala City, and a president for each of the five constituent states. The constitution abolished slavery and maintained the privileges of the Roman Catholic Church, while restricting suffrage to the upper classes.

The territory that now makes up Belize was heavily contested in a dispute that continued for decades after Guatemala achieved independence. Spain, and later Guatemala, considered this land a Guatemalan department. In 1862, Britain formally declared it a British colony and named it British Honduras. It became independent as Belize in 1981.

Central America, 1862

Panama, situated in the southernmost part of Central America on the Isthmus of Panama, has for most of its history been culturally and politically linked to South America. Panama was part of the Province of Tierra Firme from 1510 until 1538 when it came under the jurisdiction of the newly formed Audiencia Real de Panama. Beginning in 1543, Panama was administered as part of the Viceroyalty of Peru, along with all other Spanish possessions in South America. Panama remained as part of the Viceroyalty of Peru until 1739, when it was transferred to the Viceroyalty of New Granada, the capital of which was located at Santa Fé de Bogotá. Panama remained as part of the Viceroyalty of New Granada until the disestablishment of that viceroyalty in 1819. A series of military and political struggles took place from that time until 1822, the result of which produced the republic of Gran Colombia. After the dissolution of Gran Colombia in 1830, Panama became part of a successor state, the Republic of New Granada. From 1855 until 1886, Panama existed as the State of Panama, first within the Republic of New Granada, then within the Granadine Confederation, and finally within the United States of Colombia. The United States of Colombia was replaced by the Republic of Colombia in 1886. As part of the Republic of Colombia, the State of Panama was abolished and it became the Isthmus Department. Despite the many political reorganizations, Colombia was still deeply plagued by conflict, which eventually led to the secession of Panama on 3 November 1903. Only after that time did some begin to regard Panama as a North or Central American entity.

By the 1930s the United Fruit Company owned 14,000 square kilometres (3.5 million acres) of land in Central America and the Caribbean and was the single largest land owner in Guatemala. Such holdings gave it great power over the governments of small countries. That was one of the factors that led to the coining of the phrase banana republic.

After more than two hundred years of social unrest, violent conflict, and revolution, Central America today remains in a period of political transformation. Poverty, social injustice, and violence are still widespread. Nicaragua is the second poorest country in the western hemisphere, after Haiti.

== Geography ==
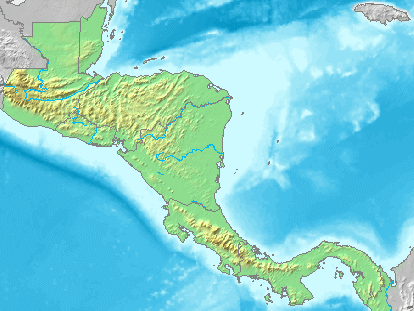
Topographical map of Central America

Central America is a part of North America consisting of a tapering isthmus running from the southern extent of Mexico to the northwestern portion of South America. Central America has the Gulf of Mexico, a body of water within the Atlantic Ocean, to the north; the Caribbean Sea, also part of the Atlantic Ocean, to the northeast; and the Pacific Ocean to the southwest. Some physiographists define the Isthmus of Tehuantepec as the northern geographic border of Central America, while others use the northwestern borders of Belize and Guatemala. From there, the Central American land mass extends southeastward to the Atrato River, where it connects to the Pacific Lowlands in northwestern South America.

Central America has over 70 active volcanoes, 41 which are located in El Salvador, and Guatemala. The volcano with the most activity in Central America is Santa María. Still experiencing frequent eruptions to this day, with the last one beginning in 2013, and still is going on to this day.

Of the many mountain ranges within Central America, the longest are the Sierra Madre de Chiapas, the Cordillera Isabelia and the Cordillera de Talamanca. At 4,220 meters (13,850 ft), Volcán Tajumulco is the highest peak in Central America. Other high points of Central America are as listed in the table below:

High points in Central America
Country	Name	Elevation	Range
Belize	Doyle's Delight	1,124 m (3,688 ft)	Maya Mountains
Costa Rica	Cerro Chirripó	3,820 m (12,530 ft)	Cordillera de Talamanca
El Salvador	Cerro El Pital	2,730 m (8,960 ft)	Sierra Madre de Chiapas
Guatemala	Volcán Tajumulco	4,220 m (13,850 ft)	Sierra Madre de Chiapas
Honduras	Cerro Las Minas	2,780 m (9,120 ft)	Sierra Madre de Chiapas
Nicaragua	Mogotón	2,107 m (6,913 ft)	Cordillera Isabelia
Panama	Volcán Barú	3,474 m (11,398 ft)	Cordillera de Talamanca

Between the mountain ranges lie fertile valleys that are suitable for the raising of livestock and for the production of coffee, tobacco, beans and other crops. Most of the population of Honduras, Costa Rica and Guatemala lives in valleys.

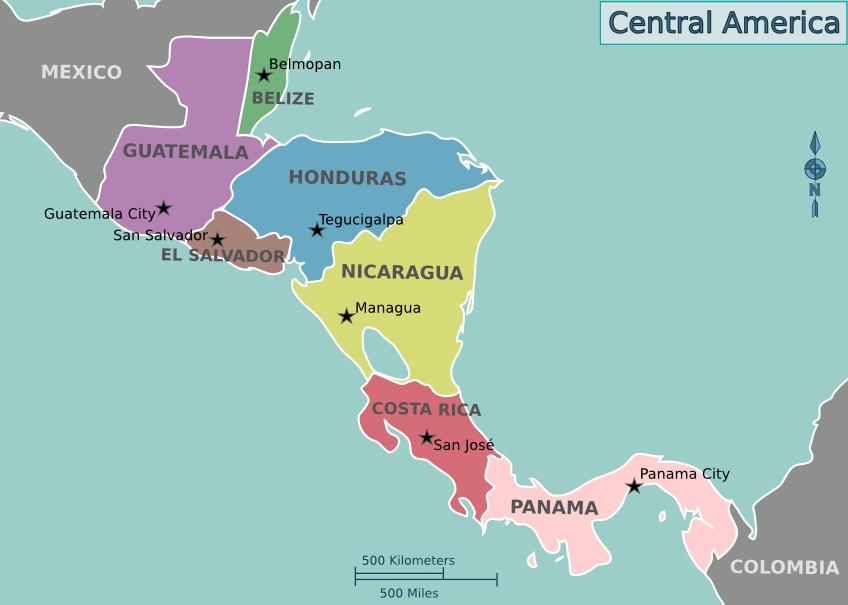
The seven countries of Central America and their capitals

Trade winds have a significant effect upon the climate of Central America. Temperatures in Central America are highest just prior to the summer wet season, and are lowest during the winter dry season, when trade winds contribute to a cooler climate. The highest temperatures occur in April, due to higher levels of sunlight, lower cloud cover and a decrease in trade winds.

=== Central American forests ===
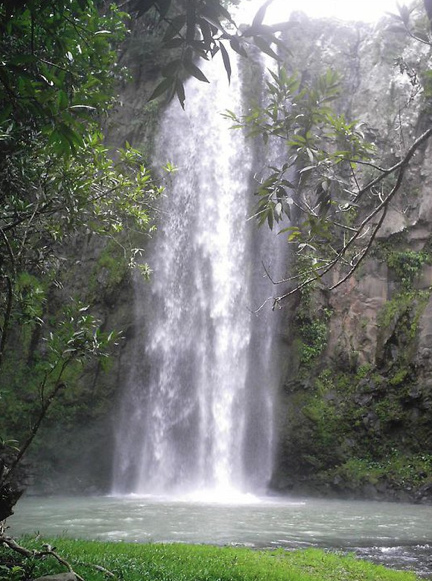
El Chorreron in El Salvador

Central America is part of the Mesoamerican biodiversity hotspot, boasting 7% of the world's biodiversity. The Pacific Flyway is a major north–south flyway for migratory birds in the Americas, extending from Alaska to Tierra del Fuego. Due to the funnel-like shape of its land mass, migratory birds can be seen in very high concentrations in Central America, especially in the spring and autumn. As a bridge between North America and South America, Central America has many species from the Nearctic and the Neotropical realms. However the southern countries (Costa Rica and Panama) of the region have more biodiversity than the northern countries (Guatemala and Belize), meanwhile the central countries (Honduras, Nicaragua and El Salvador) have the least biodiversity. The table below shows recent statistics:

Biodiversity in Central America (numbers of different species of terrestrial vertebrate animals and vascular plants)
Country	Amphibian species	Bird species	Mammal species	Reptile species	Total terrestrial vertebrate species	Vascular plants species	Biodiversity
Belize	46	544	147	140	877	2894	3771
Costa Rica	183	838	232	258	1511	12119	13630
El Salvador	30	434	137	106	707	2911	3618
Guatemala	133	684	193	236	1246	8681	9927
Honduras	101	699	201	213	1214	5680	6894
Nicaragua	61	632	181	178	1052	7590	8642
Panama	182	904	241	242	1569	9915	11484

Over 300 species of the region's flora and fauna are threatened, 107 of which are classified as critically endangered. The underlying problems are deforestation, which is estimated by FAO at 1.2% per year in Central America and Mexico combined, fragmentation of rainforests and the fact that 80% of the vegetation in Central America has already been converted to agriculture.

Efforts to protect fauna and flora in the region are made by creating ecoregions and nature reserves. 36% of Belize's land territory falls under some form of official protected status, giving Belize one of the most extensive systems of terrestrial protected areas in the Americas. In addition, 13% of Belize's marine territory are also protected. A large coral reef extends from Mexico to Honduras: the Mesoamerican Barrier Reef System. The Belize Barrier Reef is part of this. The Belize Barrier Reef is home to a large diversity of plants and animals, and is one of the most diverse ecosystems of the world. It is home to 70 hard coral species, 36 soft coral species, 500 species of fish and hundreds of invertebrate species. So far only about 10% of the species in the Belize barrier reef have been discovered.

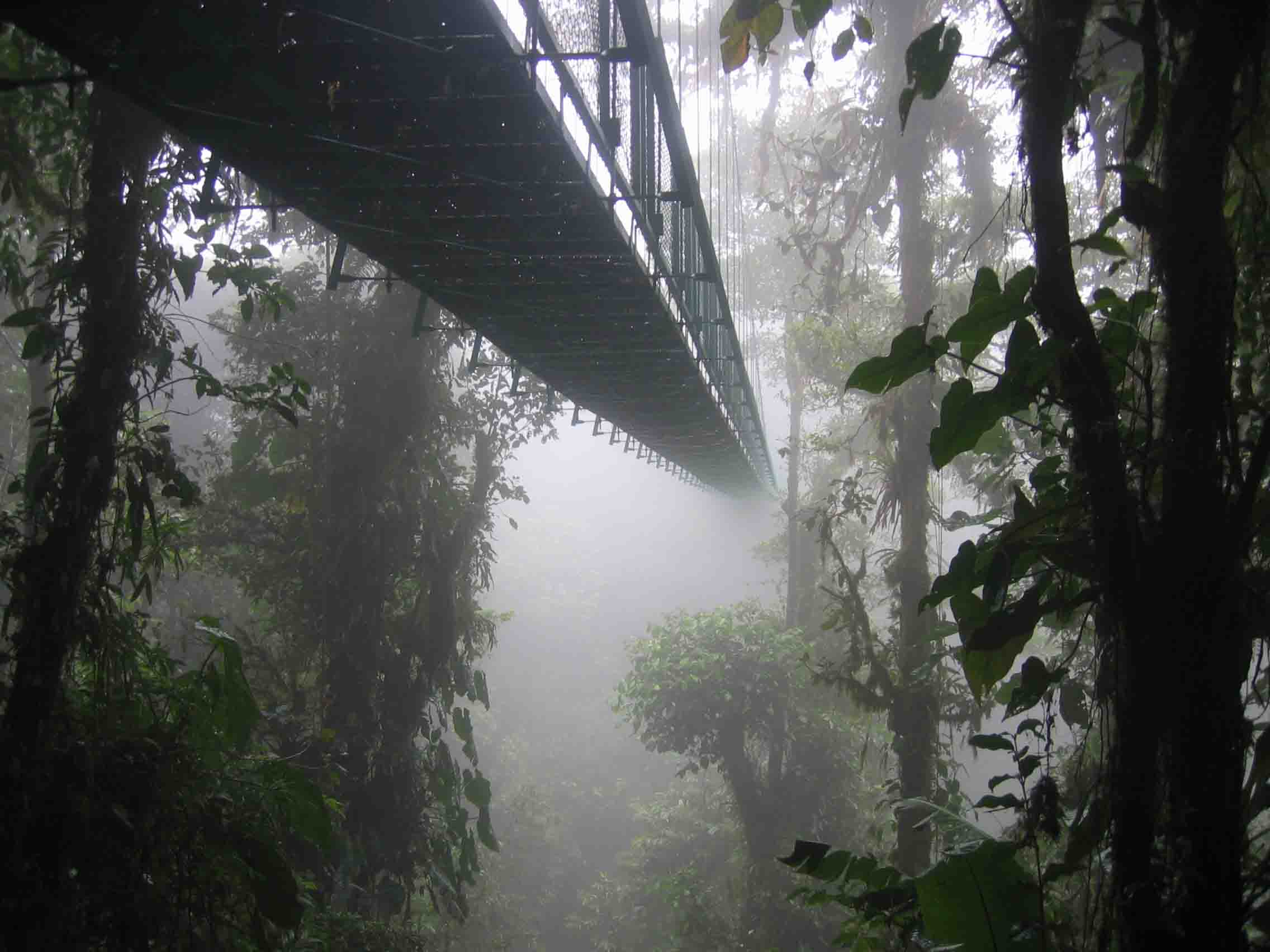
One of the hanging bridges of the skywalk at the Monteverde Cloud Forest Reserve in Monteverde, Costa Rica disappearing into the clouds

From 2001 to 2010, 5,376 square kilometers (2,076 sq mi) of forest were lost in the region. In 2010 Belize had 63% of remaining forest cover, Costa Rica 46%, Panama 45%, Honduras 41%, Guatemala 37%, Nicaragua 29%, and El Salvador 21%. Most of the loss occurred in the moist forest biome, with 12,201 square kilometers (4,711 sq mi). Woody vegetation loss was partially set off by a gain in the coniferous forest biome with 4,730 square kilometers (1,830 sq mi), and a gain in the dry forest biome at 2,054 square kilometers (793 sq mi). Mangroves and deserts contributed only 1% to the loss in forest vegetation. The bulk of the deforestation was located at the Caribbean slopes of Nicaragua with a loss of 8,574 square kilometers (3,310 sq mi) of forest in the period from 2001 to 2010. The most significant regrowth of 3,050 square kilometers (1,180 sq mi) of forest was seen in the coniferous woody vegetation of Honduras.

=== Montane forests ===
The Central American pine-oak forests ecoregion, in the tropical and subtropical coniferous forests biome, is found in Central America and southern Mexico. The Central American pine-oak forests occupy an area of 111,400 square kilometers (43,000 sq mi), extending along the mountainous spine of Central America, extending from the Sierra Madre de Chiapas in Mexico's Chiapas state through the highlands of Guatemala, El Salvador, and Honduras to central Nicaragua. The pine-oak forests lie between 600–1,800 metres (2,000–5,900 ft) elevation, and are surrounded at lower elevations by tropical moist forests and tropical dry forests. Higher elevations above 1,800 metres (5,900 ft) are usually covered with Central American montane forests. The Central American pine-oak forests are composed of many species characteristic of temperate North America including oak, pine, fir, and cypress.

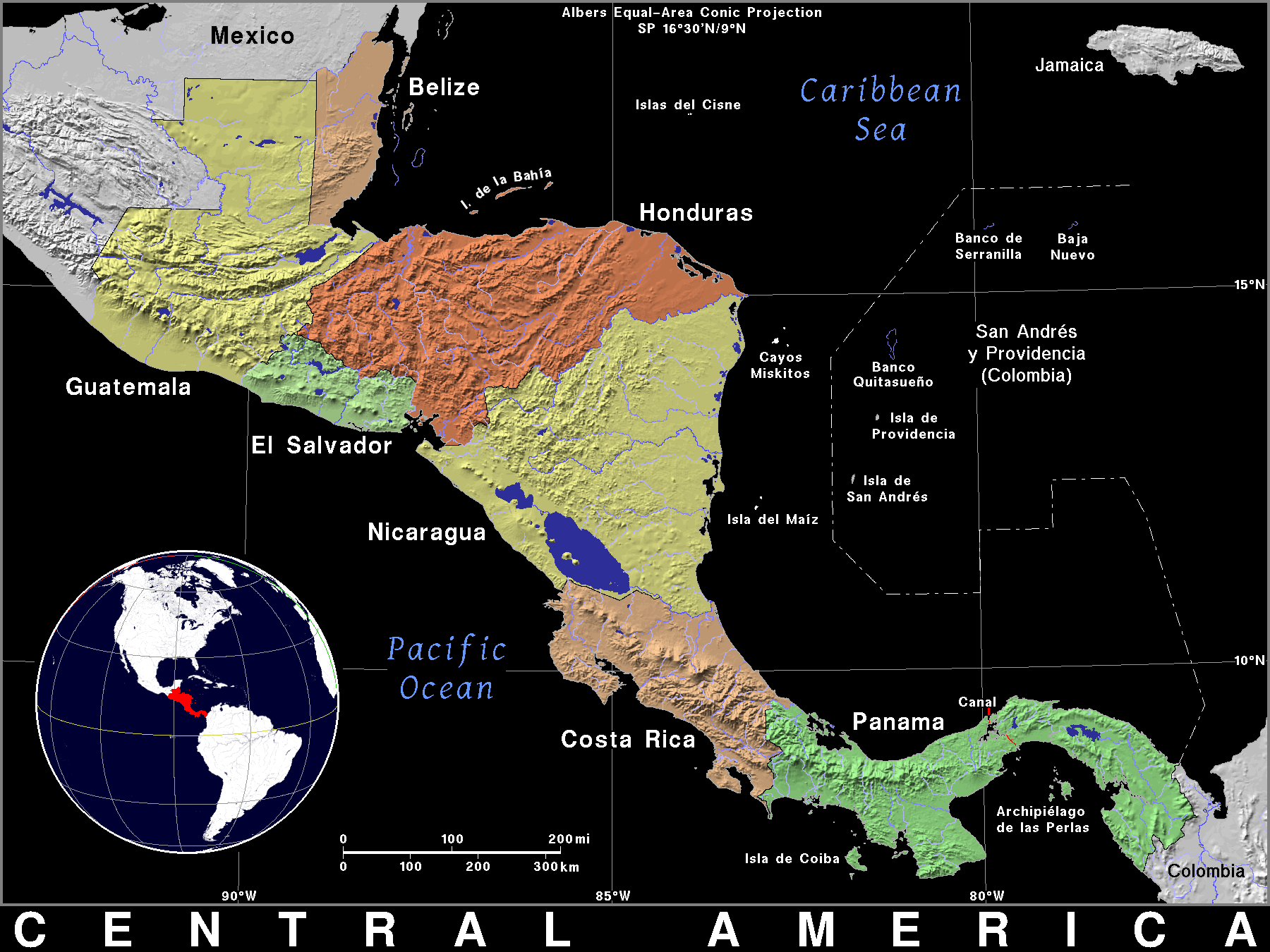
Central American geography with country borders

Laurel forest is the most common type of Central American temperate evergreen cloud forest, found in almost all Central American countries, normally more than 1,000 meters (3,300 ft) above sea level. Tree species include evergreen oaks, members of the laurel family, species of Weinmannia and Magnolia, and Drimys granadensis. The cloud forest of Sierra de las Minas, Guatemala, is the largest in Central America. In some areas of southeastern Honduras there are cloud forests, the largest located near the border with Nicaragua. In Nicaragua, cloud forests are situated near the border with Honduras, but many were cleared to grow coffee. There are still some temperate evergreen hills in the north. The only cloud forest in the Pacific coastal zone of Central America is on the Mombacho volcano in Nicaragua. In Costa Rica, there are laurel forests in the Cordillera de Tilarán and Volcán Arenal, called Monteverde, also in the Cordillera de Talamanca.

The Central American montane forests are an ecoregion of the tropical and subtropical moist broadleaf forests biome, as defined by the World Wildlife Fund. These forests are of the moist deciduous and the semi-evergreen seasonal subtype of tropical and subtropical moist broadleaf forests and receive high overall rainfall with a warm summer wet season and a cooler winter dry season. Central American montane forests consist of forest patches located at altitudes ranging from 1,800–4,000 metres (5,900–13,100 ft), on the summits and slopes of the highest mountains in Central America ranging from Southern Mexico, through Guatemala, El Salvador, and Honduras, to northern Nicaragua. The entire ecoregion covers an area of 13,200 square kilometers (5,100 sq mi) and has a temperate climate with relatively high precipitation levels.

Ecoregions are not only established to protect the forests themselves but also because they are habitats for an incomparably rich and often endemic fauna. Almost half of the bird population of the Talamancan montane forests in Costa Rica and Panama are endemic to this region. Several birds are listed as threatened, most notably the resplendent quetzal (Pharomacrus mocinno), three-wattled bellbird (Procnias tricarunculata), bare-necked umbrellabird (Cephalopterus glabricollis), and black guan (Chamaepetes unicolor). Many of the amphibians are endemic and depend on the existence of forest. The golden toad that once inhabited a small region in the Monteverde Reserve, which is part of the Talamancan montane forests, has not been seen alive since 1989 and is listed as extinct by IUCN. The exact causes for its extinction are unknown. Global warming may have played a role, because the development of that frog is typical for this area may have been compromised. Seven small mammals are endemic to the Costa Rica-Chiriqui highlands within the Talamancan montane forest region. Jaguars, cougars, spider monkeys, as well as tapirs, and anteaters live in the woods of Central America. The Central American red brocket is a brocket deer found in Central America's tropical forest.

=== Geology ===
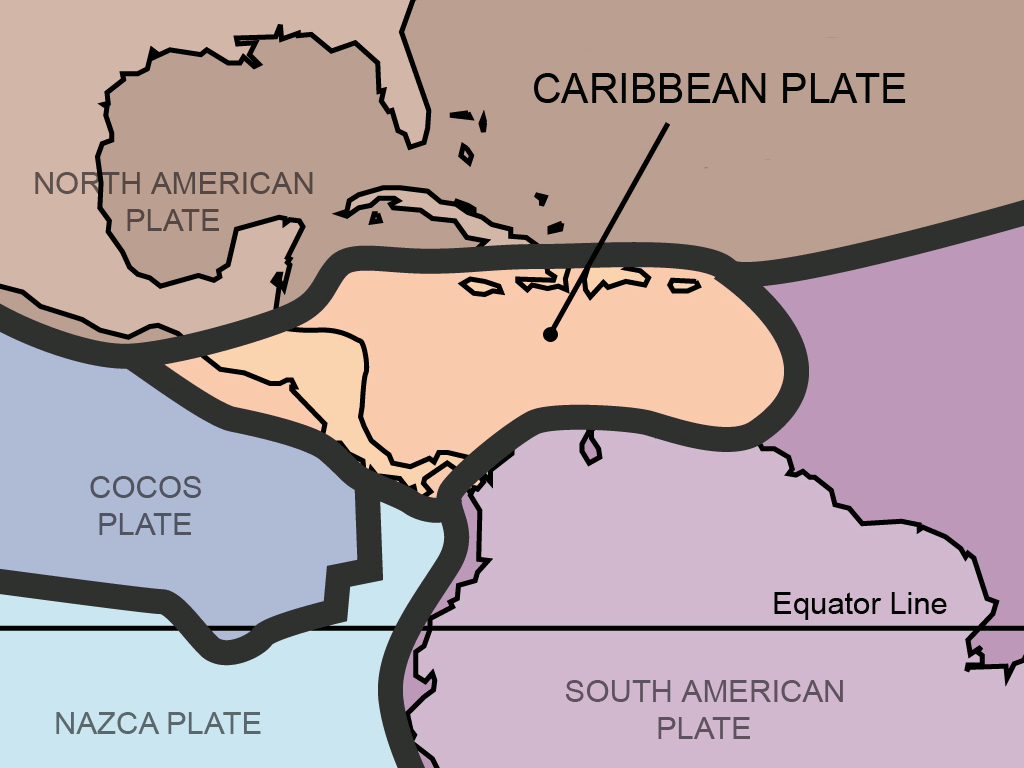
Central America and the Caribbean Plate

Central America is geologically very active, with volcanic eruptions and earthquakes occurring frequently, and tsunamis occurring occasionally. Many thousands of people have died as a result of these natural disasters.

Most of Central America rests atop the Caribbean Plate. This tectonic plate converges with the Cocos, Nazca, and North American plates to form the Middle America Trench, a major subduction zone. The Middle America Trench is situated some 60–160 kilometers (37–99 mi) off the Pacific coast of Central America and runs roughly parallel to it. Many large earthquakes have occurred as a result of seismic activity at the Middle America Trench. For example, subduction of the Cocos Plate beneath the North American Plate at the Middle America Trench is believed to have caused the 1985 Mexico City earthquake that killed as many as 40,000 people. Seismic activity at the Middle America Trench is also responsible for earthquakes in 1902, 1942, 1956, 1972, 1982, 1992, January 2001, February 2001, 2007, 2012, 2014, and many other earthquakes throughout Central America.

The Middle America Trench is not the only source of seismic activity in Central America. The Motagua Fault is an onshore continuation of the Cayman Trough which forms part of the tectonic boundary between the North American Plate and the Caribbean Plate. This transform fault cuts right across Guatemala and then continues offshore until it merges with the Middle America Trench along the Pacific coast of Mexico, near Acapulco. Seismic activity at the Motagua Fault has been responsible for earthquakes in 1717, 1773, 1902, 1976, 1980, and 2009.

Another onshore continuation of the Cayman Trough is the Chixoy-Polochic Fault, which runs parallel to, and roughly 80 kilometers (50 mi) to the north, of the Motagua Fault. Though less active than the Motagua Fault, seismic activity at the Chixoy-Polochic Fault is still thought to be capable of producing very large earthquakes, such as the 1816 earthquake of Guatemala.

Managua, the capital of Nicaragua, was devastated by earthquakes in 1931 and 1972.

Volcanic eruptions are also common in Central America. In 1968 the Arenal Volcano, in Costa Rica, erupted killing 87 people as the 3 villages of Tabacon, Pueblo Nuevo and San Luis were buried under pyroclastic flows and debris. Fertile soils from weathered volcanic lava have made it possible to sustain dense populations in the agriculturally productive highland areas.

== Politics ==
=== Integration ===
Sistema de Integración Centroamericana Central American Integration System
- Coat of arms
- Motto: "Peace, Development, Liberty and Democracy"
- Anthem: La Granadera
- Countries: Belize; Costa Rica; El Salvador; Guatemala; Honduras; Nicaragua; Panama; Dominican Republic

Area
  - Total: 523,780 km^{2} (202,230 sq mi)

Population
  - 2022 estimate: 52,176,283
  - Density: 99.6/km^{2} (258.0/sq mi)

Central America is currently undergoing a process of political, economic and cultural transformation that started in 1907 with the creation of the Central American Court of Justice.

In 1951 the integration process continued with the signature of the San Salvador Treaty, which created the ODECA, the Organization of Central American States. However, the unity of the ODECA was limited by conflicts between several member states.

In 1991, the integration agenda was further advanced by the creation of the Central American Integration System (Sistema para la Integración Centroamericana, or SICA). SICA provides a clear legal basis to avoid disputes between the member states. SICA membership includes the 7 nations of Central America plus the Dominican Republic, a state that is traditionally considered part of the Caribbean.

On 6 December 2008, SICA announced an agreement to pursue a common currency and common passport for the member nations. No timeline for implementation was discussed.

Central America already has several supranational institutions such as the Central American Parliament, the Central American Bank for Economic Integration and the Central American Common Market.

On 22 July 2011, President Mauricio Funes of El Salvador became the first president pro tempore to SICA. El Salvador also became the headquarters of SICA with the inauguration of a new building.

=== Parliament ===
Emblem of the Central American Parliament

The Central American Parliament (aka PARLACEN) is a political and parliamentary body of SICA. The parliament started around 1980, and its primary goal was to resolve conflicts in Nicaragua, Guatemala, and El Salvador. Although the group was disbanded in 1986, ideas of unity of Central Americans still remained, so a treaty was signed in 1987 to create the Central American Parliament and other political bodies. Its original members were Guatemala, El Salvador, Nicaragua and Honduras. The parliament is the political organ of Central America, and is part of SICA. New members have since then joined including Panama and the Dominican Republic.

Costa Rica is not a member state of the Central American Parliament and its adhesion remains as a very unpopular topic at all levels of the Costa Rican society due to existing strong political criticism towards the regional parliament, since it is regarded by Costa Ricans as a menace to democratic accountability and effectiveness of integration efforts. Excessively high salaries for its members, legal immunity of jurisdiction from any member State, corruption, lack of a binding nature and effectiveness of the regional parliament's decisions, high operative costs and immediate membership of Central American presidents once they leave their office and presidential terms, are the most common reasons invoked by Costa Ricans against the Central American Parliament.

=== Foreign relations ===
Until recently, all Central American countries maintained diplomatic relations with Taiwan instead of China. President Óscar Arias of Costa Rica, however, established diplomatic relations with China in 2007, severing formal diplomatic ties with Taiwan. After breaking off relations with the Republic of China in 2017, Panama established diplomatic relations with the People's Republic of China. In August 2018, El Salvador also severed ties with Taiwan to formally start recognizing the People's Republic of China as sole China, a move many considered lacked transparency due to its abruptness and reports of the Chinese government's desires to invest in the department of La Union while also promising to fund the ruling party's reelection campaign. President of El Salvador Nayib Bukele broke diplomatic relations with Taiwan and established ties with China. On 9 December 2021, Nicaragua resumed relations with the PRC.

== Economy ==
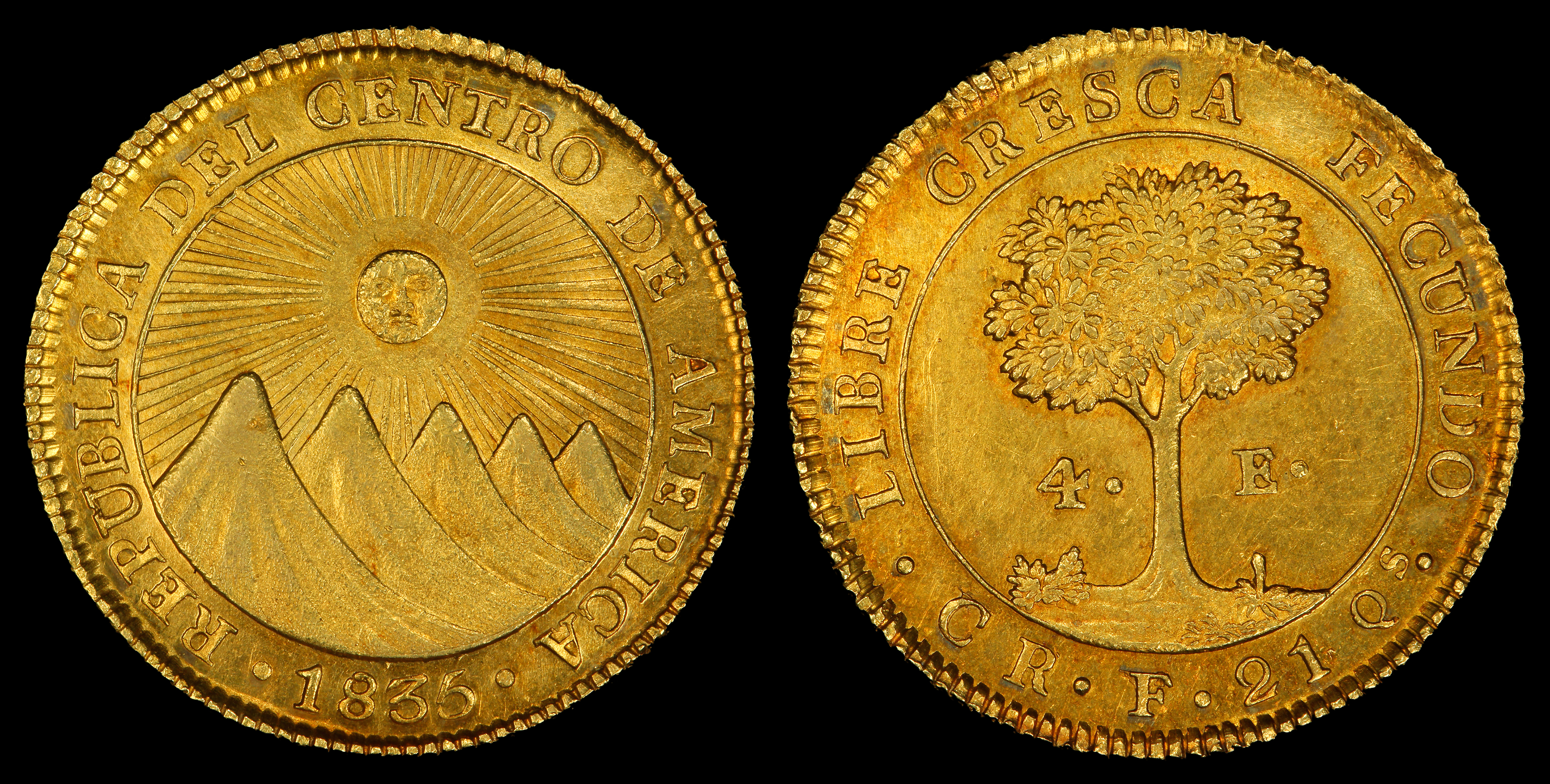
Federal Republic of Central America, 4 Escudos (1835). Struck in the San Jose, Costa Rica mint (697 were minted)

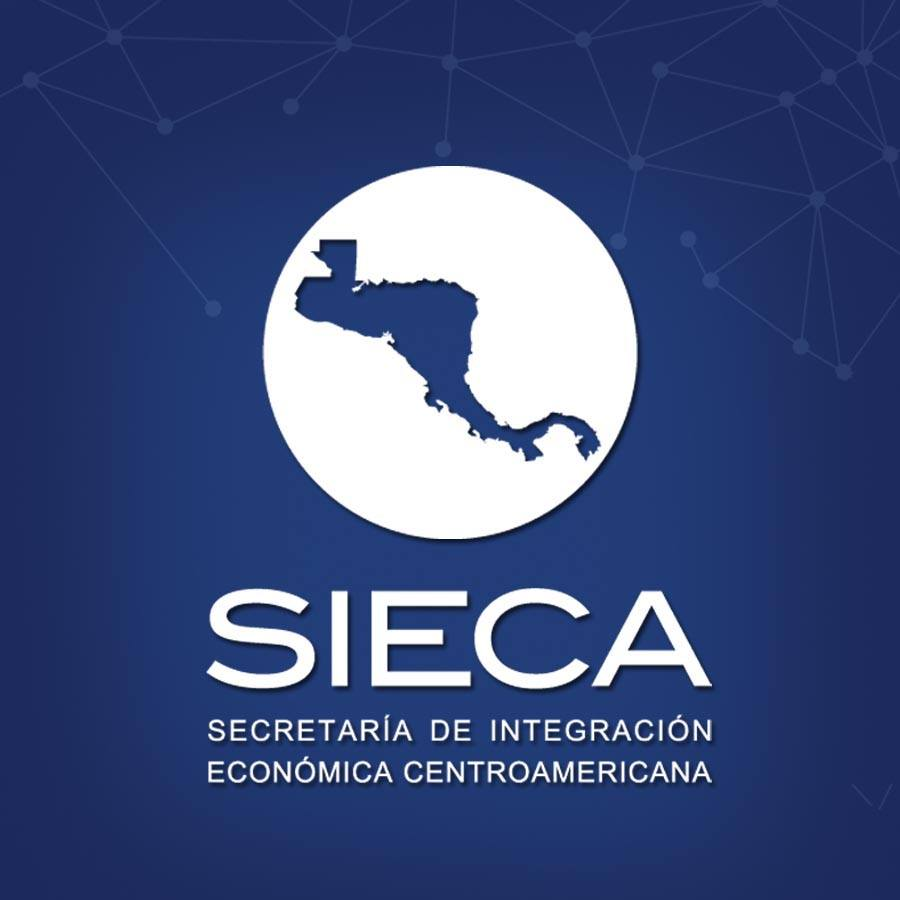
Secretariat of Central American Economic Integration

Signed in 2004, the Central American Free Trade Agreement (CAFTA) is an agreement between the United States, Costa Rica, El Salvador, Guatemala, Honduras, Nicaragua, and the Dominican Republic. The treaty is aimed at promoting free trade among its members.

Guatemala has the largest economy in the region. Its main exports are coffee, sugar, bananas, petroleum, clothing, and cardamom. Of its 10.29 billion dollar annual exports, 40.2% go to the United States, 11.1% to neighboring El Salvador, 8% to Honduras, 5.5% to Mexico, 4.7% to Nicaragua, and 4.3% to Costa Rica.

The region is particularly attractive for companies (especially clothing companies) because of its geographical proximity to the United States, very low wages and considerable tax advantages. In addition, the decline in the prices of coffee and other export products and the structural adjustment measures promoted by the international financial institutions have partly ruined agriculture, favouring the emergence of maquiladoras. This sector accounts for 42 per cent of total exports from El Salvador, 55 per cent from Guatemala, and 65 per cent from Honduras. However, its contribution to the economies of these countries is disputed; raw materials are imported, jobs are precarious and low-paid, and tax exemptions weaken public finances.

They are also criticised for the working conditions of employees: insults and physical violence, abusive dismissals (especially of pregnant workers), working hours, non-payment of overtime. According to Lucrecia Bautista, coordinator of the maquilas sector of the audit firm Coverco, "labour law regulations are regularly violated in maquilas and there is no political will to enforce their application. In the case of infringements, the labour inspectorate shows remarkable leniency. It is a question of not discouraging investors." Trade unionists are subject to pressure, and sometimes to kidnapping or murder. In some cases, business leaders have used the services of the maras. Finally, black lists containing the names of trade unionists or political activists are circulating in employers' circles.

Economic growth in Central America is projected to slow slightly in 2014–15, as country-specific domestic factors offset the positive effects from stronger economic activity in the United States.

Gross Domestic Product (GDP) of Central American countries
Country	GDP (nominal) $ millions (Note: Values listed in millions USD.)	GDP (nominal per capita)	GDP (PPP) $ millions
Belize	1,552	$4,602	2,914
Costa Rica	44,313	$10,432	57,955
El Salvador	24,421	$3,875	46,050
Guatemala	50,303	$3,512	78,012
Honduras	18,320	$2,323	37,408
Nicaragua	7,695	$1,839	19,827
Panama	34,517	$10,838	55,124

=== Coasts ===
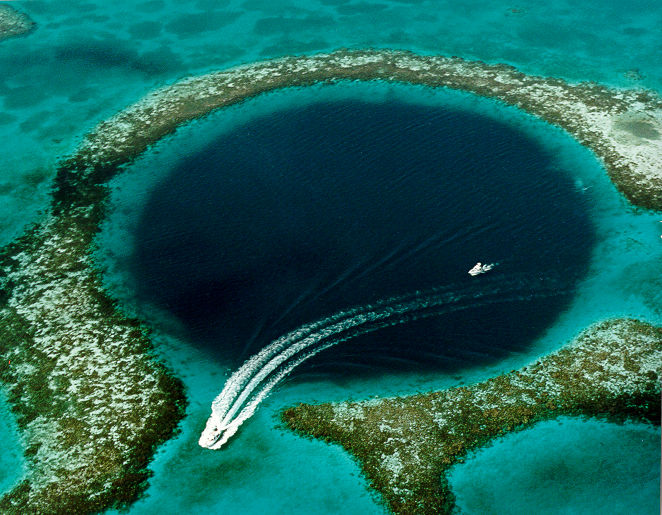
The Great Blue Hole off the coast of Belize is a prime ecotourism destination. It is a UNESCO World Heritage Site

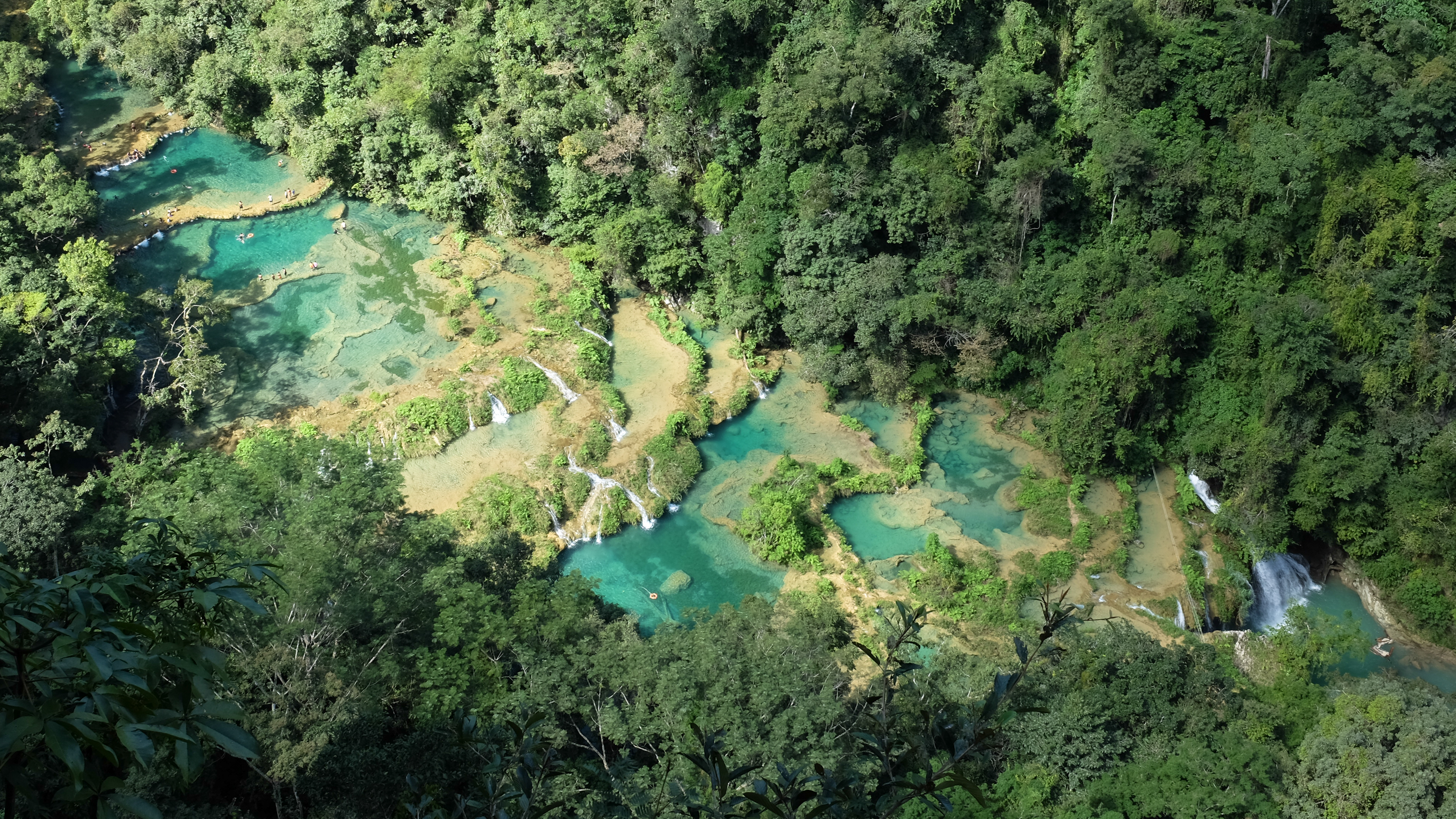
Semuc Champey, Guatemala

Tourism in Belize has grown considerably in more recent times, and it is now the second largest industry in the nation. Belizean Prime Minister Dean Barrow has stated his intention to use tourism to combat poverty throughout the country. The growth in tourism has positively affected the agricultural, commercial, and finance industries, as well as the construction industry. The results for Belize's tourism-driven economy have been significant, with the nation welcoming almost one million tourists in a calendar year for the first time in its history in 2012. Belize is also the only country in Central America with English as its official language, making this country a comfortable destination for English-speaking tourists.

Costa Rica is the most visited nation in Central America. Tourism in Costa Rica is one of the fastest growing economic sectors of the country, having become the largest source of foreign revenue by 1995. Since 1999, tourism has earned more foreign exchange than bananas, pineapples and coffee exports combined. The tourism boom began in 1987, with the number of visitors up from 329,000 in 1988, through 1.03 million in 1999, to a historical record of 2.43 million foreign visitors and $1.92-billion in revenue in 2013. In 2012 tourism contributed with 12.5% of the country's GDP and it was responsible for 11.7% of direct and indirect employment.

Tourism in Nicaragua has grown considerably recently, and it is now the second largest industry in the nation. Nicaraguan president Daniel Ortega has stated his intention to use tourism to combat poverty throughout the country. The growth in tourism has positively affected the agricultural, commercial, and finance industries, as well as the construction industry. The results for Nicaragua's tourism-driven economy have been significant, with the nation welcoming one million tourists in a calendar year for the first time in its history in 2010.

=== Transport ===
==== Roads ====
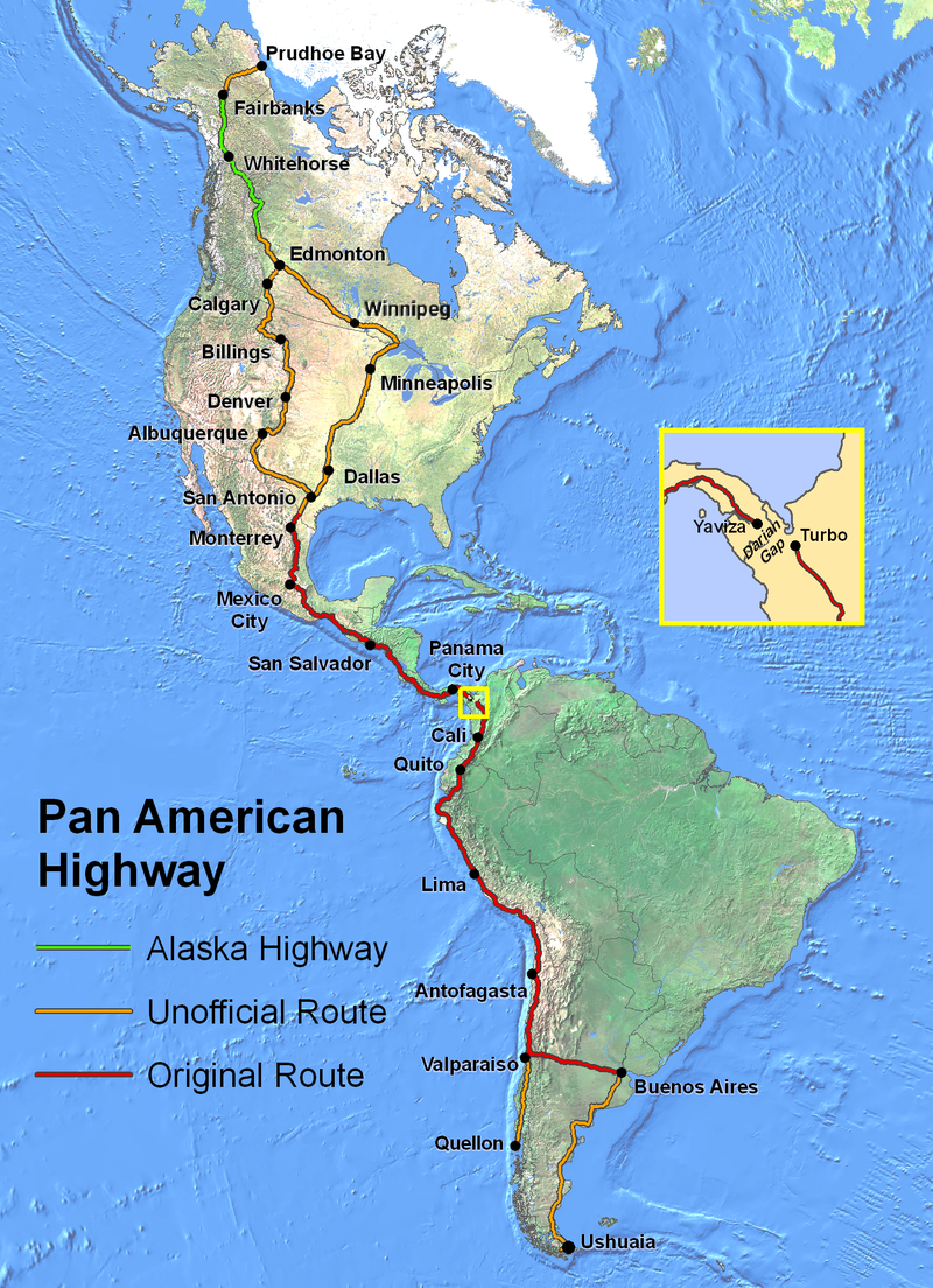
Pan-American Highway slices through Central America

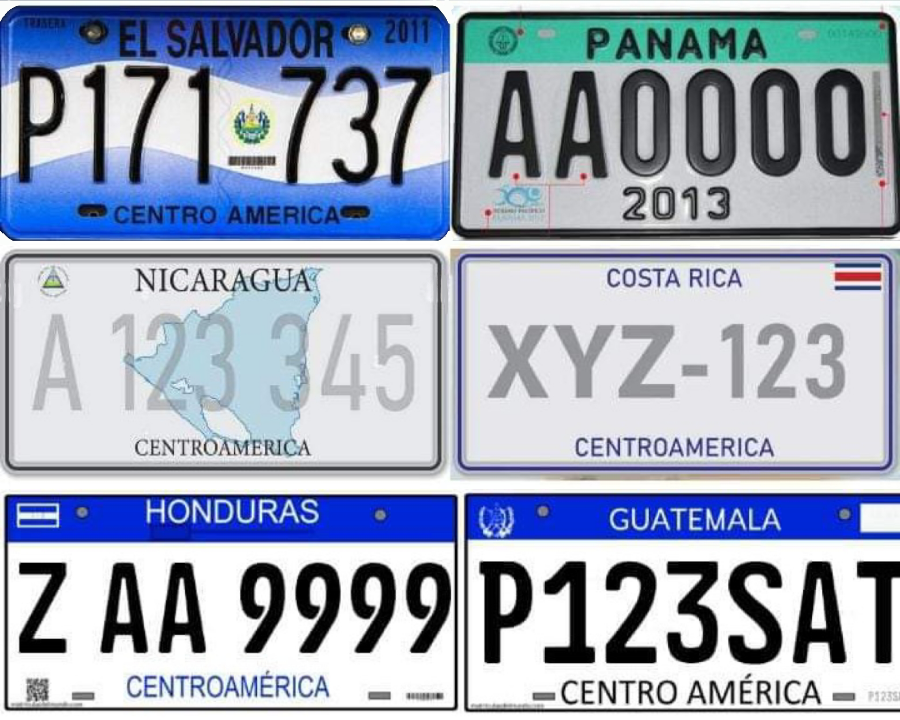
Central American license plates

The Inter-American Highway is the Central American section of the Pan-American Highway, and spans 5,470 kilometers (3,400 mi) between Nuevo Laredo, Mexico, and Panama City, Panama. Because of the 87-kilometer (54 mi) break in the highway known as the Darién Gap, it is not possible to cross between Central America and South America in an automobile.

== Demographics ==
=== Countries ===
The population of Central America is estimated at 50,956,791 as of 2021. With an area of 523,780 square kilometers (202,230 sq mi), it has a population density of 97.3 per square kilometre (252 per square mile). Human Development Index values are from the estimates for 2017.

Countries of Central America
Country	Area	Population (2021 est.)	Population density	Capital	Official language	Human development index
Belize	22,966 km^{2} (8,867 sq mi)	400,031	17/km^{2} (45/sq mi)	Belmopan	English	0.708 High
Costa Rica	51,180 km^{2} (19,760 sq mi)	5,153,957	101/km^{2} (261/sq mi)	San José	Spanish	0.794 High
El Salvador	21,041 km^{2} (8,124 sq mi)	6,314,167	300/km^{2} (777/sq mi)	San Salvador	Spanish	0.674 Medium
Guatemala	108,889 km^{2} (42,042 sq mi)	17,608,483	162/km^{2} (419/sq mi)	Guatemala City	Spanish	0.650 Medium
Honduras	112,090 km^{2} (43,280 sq mi)	10,278,345	92/km^{2} (237/sq mi)	Tegucigalpa	Spanish	0.617 Medium
Nicaragua	130,370 km^{2} (50,340 sq mi)	6,850,540	53/km^{2} (136/sq mi)	Managua	Spanish	0.658 Medium
Panama	75,420 km^{2} (29,120 sq mi)	4,351,267	58/km^{2} (149/sq mi)	Panama City	Spanish	0.789 High
Total	521,876 km^{2} (201,497 sq mi)	50,956,790	-	-	-	0.699

=== Metropolitan areas ===
Largest metropolitan areas in Central America
City	Country	Population	Census Year	% of National Population
Guatemala City	Guatemala	5,700,000	2010	26%
San Salvador	El Salvador	2,415,217	2009	39%
Managua	Nicaragua	2,045,000	2012	34%
Tegucigalpa	Honduras	1,819,000	2010	24%
San Pedro Sula	Honduras	1,600,000	2010	21%+4
Panama City	Panama	1,400,000	2010	37%
San José	Costa Rica	1,275,000	2013	30%

=== Ethnic groups ===
Central America map of indigenous people before European contact

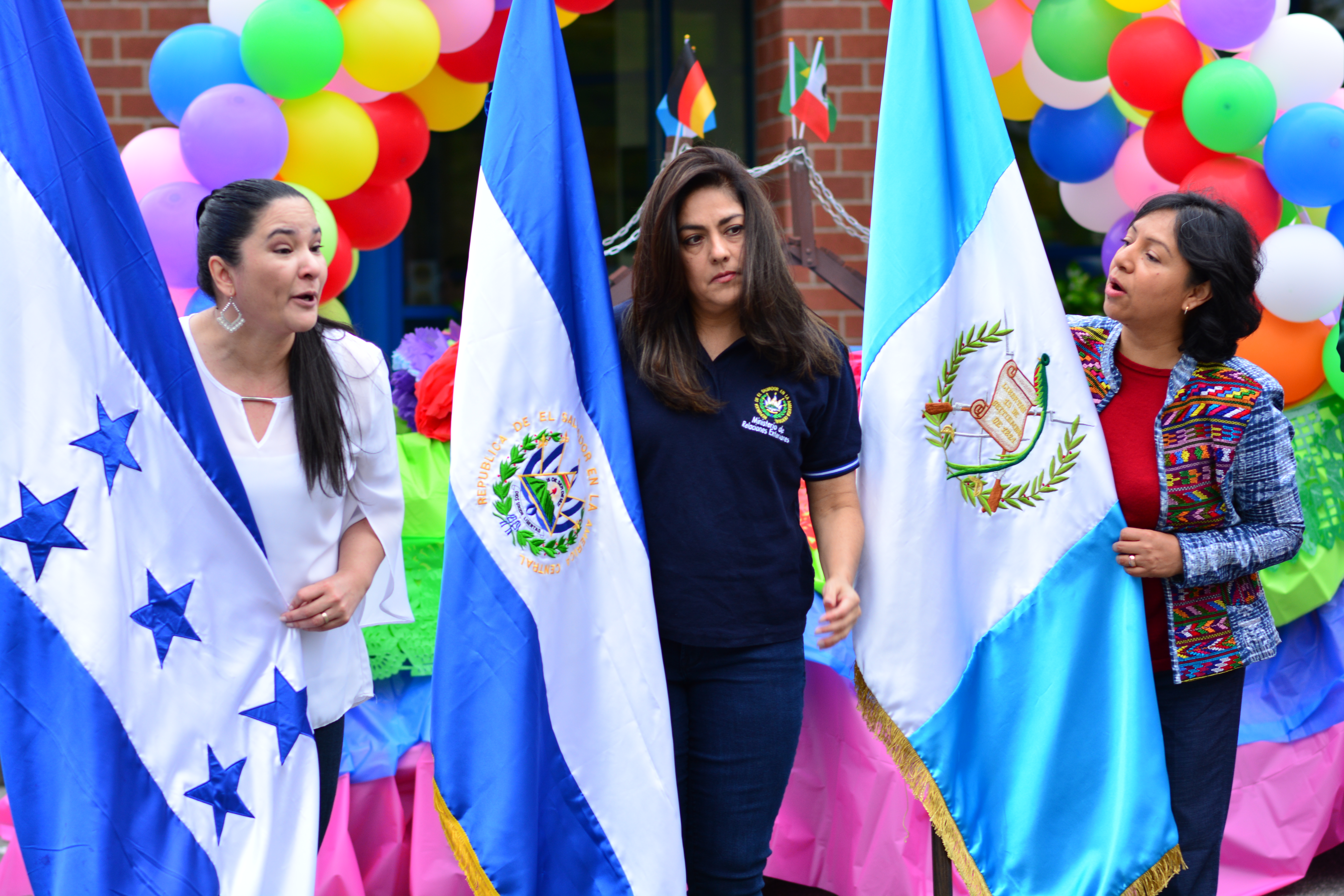
Central American women

This region of the continent is very rich in terms of ethnic groups. The majority of the population is mestizo, with sizable Mayan and African descendent populations present, along with numerous other indigenous groups such as the Miskito people. The immigration of Arabs, Jews, Chinese, Europeans and others brought additional groups to the area.

Ethnic groups in Central America (2010)
Country	Population	% Amerindian	% White	% Mestizo/Mixed	% Black	% Other
Belize	324,528	6.3%	5.0%	49.6%	32.0%	4.1%
Costa Rica	4,301,712	4.0%	82.3%	15.7%	1.3%	0.7%
El Salvador	6,340,889	1.0%	12.0%	86.0%	0.13%	1.0%
Guatemala	15,700,000	42.0%	4.0%	53.0%	0.2%	0.8%
Honduras	8,143,564	6.0%	5.5%	82.0%	6.0%	0.5%
Nicaragua	5,815,500	5.0%	17.0%	69.0%	9.0%	0.0%
Panama	3,474,562	6.0%	10.0%	65.0%	14.0%	5.0%
Total	42,682,190	10.04%	17.04%	59.77%	9.77%	2.91%

=== Languages ===
The official language majority in all Central American countries is Spanish, except in Belize, where the official language is English. Most people in Belize speak Belizean Creole. Mayan languages constitute a language family consisting of about 26 related languages. Guatemala formally recognized 21 of these in 1996. Xinca, Miskito, and Garifuna are also present in Central America.

Native languages in Central America (2010)
Rank	Country	Population	% Spanish	% Mayan languages	% English	% Xinca	% Garifuna
1	Guatemala	17,284,000	64.7%	34.3%	0.0%	0.7%	0.3%
2	Honduras	8,447,000	97.1%	2.0%	0.0%	0.0%	0.9%
3	El Salvador	6,108,000	99.0%	1.0%	0.0%	0.0%	0.0%
4	Nicaragua	6,028,000	87.4%	7.1%	5.5%	0.0%	0.0%
5	Costa Rica	4,726,000	97.2%	1.8%	1.0%	0.0%	0.0%
6	Panama	3,652,000	86.8%	0.0%	4.0%	0.0%	0.0%
7	Belize	408,867	49.8%	8.9%	70.0%	0.0%	7.0%

=== Religion ===
The predominant religion in Central America is Christianity (95.6%). Beginning with the Spanish colonization of Central America in the 16th century, Catholicism became the most popular religion in the region until the first half of the 20th century. Since the 1960s, there has been an increase in other Christian groups, particularly Protestantism, as well as other religious organizations, and individuals identifying themselves as having no religion.

Proportions of the population by religion (2020)
Country	Roman Catholic	Protestant	Other Christian	Non-Affiliated	Other
Belize	47.4%	34.5%	7.1%	6.8%	3.2%
Costa Rica	72.5%	19.5%	2.4%	4.5%	1.1%
El Salvador	55.8%	35.3%	3.6%	5.0%	0.3%
Guatemala	55.4%	25.9%	14.3%	4.0%	0.4%
Honduras	64.9%	29.1%	2.2%	3.1%	0.7%
Nicaragua	58.3%	36.7%	1.4%	3.4%	0.1%
Panama	66.1%	23.9%	1.8%	4.2%	3.0%

Source: Jason Mandrik, Operation World Statistics (2020).

- Protestantism in Central America also include Independent Christian, most of total Protestants in this region (+80%) are Evangelicals, the rest follow traditional beliefs.
- Other Christian include Other Traditional Churches (Orthodox, Episcopalian, etc.) and contemporary churches (Mormons, Adventists, Scientology, etc.), also include Non-denominational Christian who are the most numerous group, specially in Guatemala.

=== Education ===
- List of architecture schools in Central America
- List of universities in Belize
- List of universities in Costa Rica
- List of universities in El Salvador
- List of universities in Guatemala
- List of universities in Honduras
- List of universities in Nicaragua
- List of universities in Panama

=== Life expectancy ===
List of countries by life expectancy at birth for 2023, according to the World Bank Group.

World Bank Group (2023)
Countries and territories	2023				Historical data											recovery from COVID-19: 2019→2023
Countries and territories	All	Male	Female	Sex gap	2014	2014 →2019	2019	2019 →2020	2020	2020 →2021	2021	2021 →2022	2022	2022 →2023	2023	recovery from COVID-19: 2019→2023
Costa Rica	80.80	78.13	83.42	5.29	80.23	0.07	80.30	−0.57	79.72	−1.67	78.05	1.27	79.32	1.48	80.80	0.50
Panama	79.59	76.65	82.56	5.90	77.36	1.15	78.51	−2.18	76.33	0.67	77.00	2.32	79.32	0.27	79.59	1.08
Nicaragua	74.95	72.31	77.42	5.11	72.79	0.97	73.76	−3.00	70.77	−0.29	70.48	3.98	74.46	0.48	74.95	1.18
Belize	73.57	70.93	76.50	5.57	71.44	1.14	72.58	−1.00	71.58	−0.66	70.92	1.27	72.19	1.38	73.57	0.99
World	73.33	70.95	75.84	4.89	71.78	1.09	72.87	−0.68	72.18	−0.97	71.22	1.75	72.97	0.36	73.33	0.46
Honduras	72.88	70.35	75.50	5.16	71.03	1.09	72.12	−1.26	70.86	−1.37	69.49	3.22	72.72	0.17	72.88	0.76
Guatemala	72.60	70.31	74.88	4.56	70.94	0.70	71.64	−1.67	69.97	−2.11	67.86	3.35	71.21	1.40	72.60	0.96
El Salvador	72.10	67.52	76.26	8.74	71.14	0.58	71.72	−1.48	70.24	−0.30	69.94	2.03	71.97	0.13	72.10	0.37

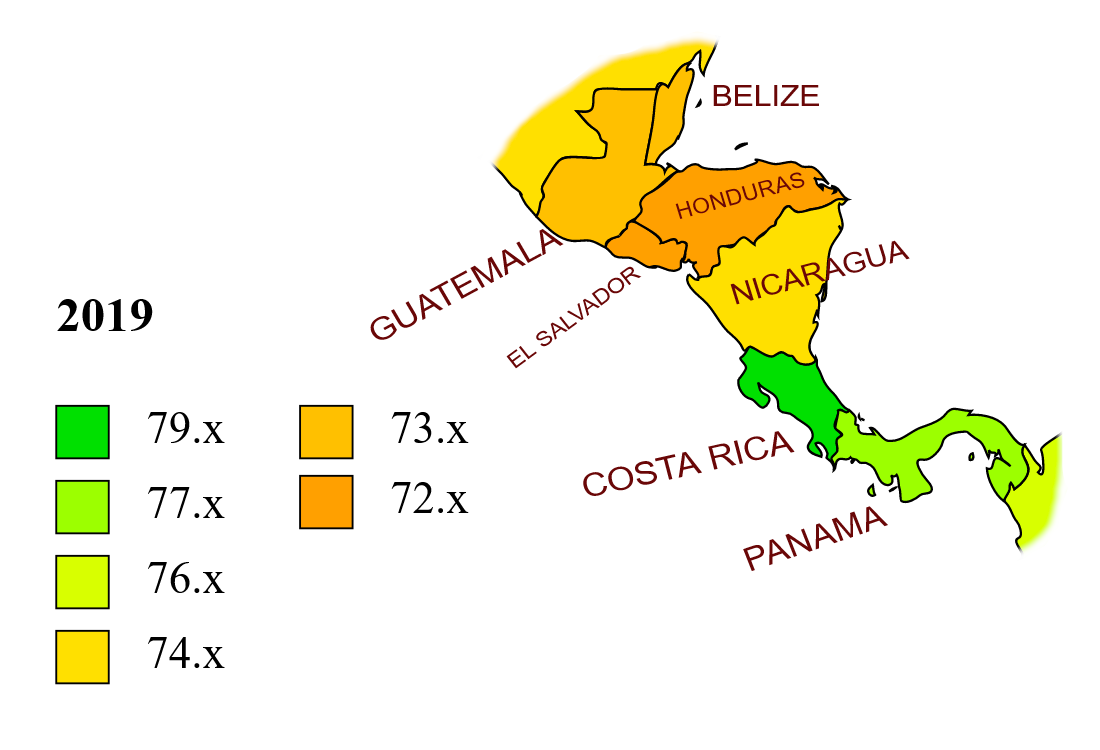
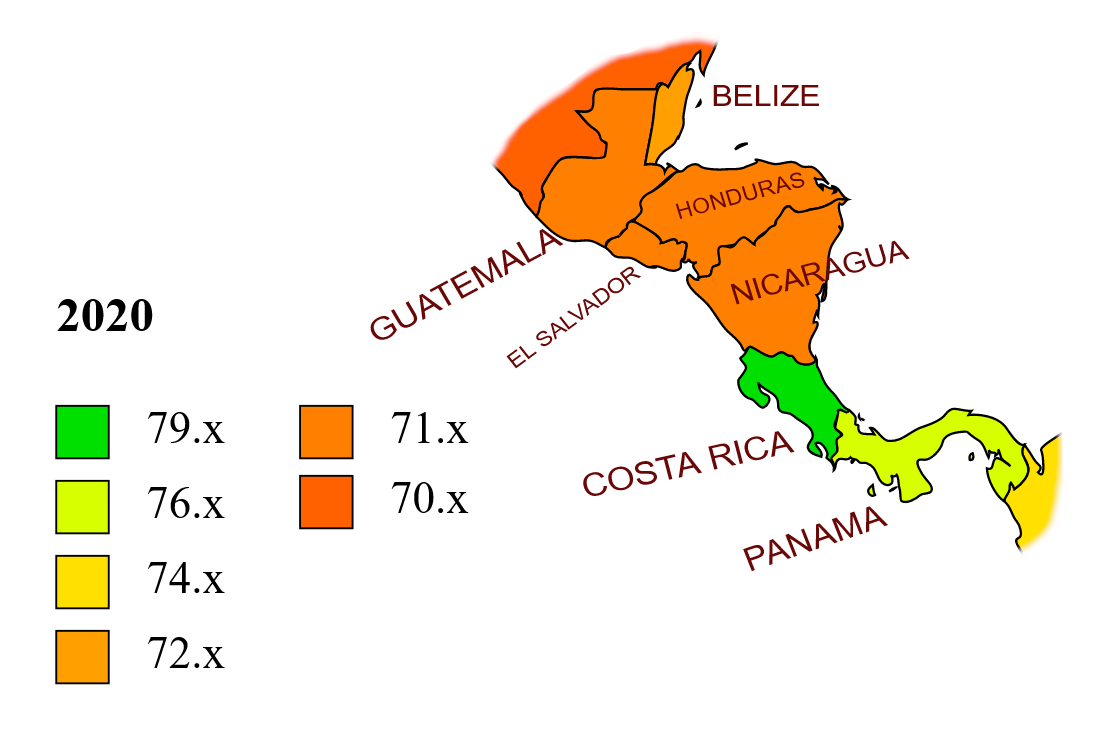
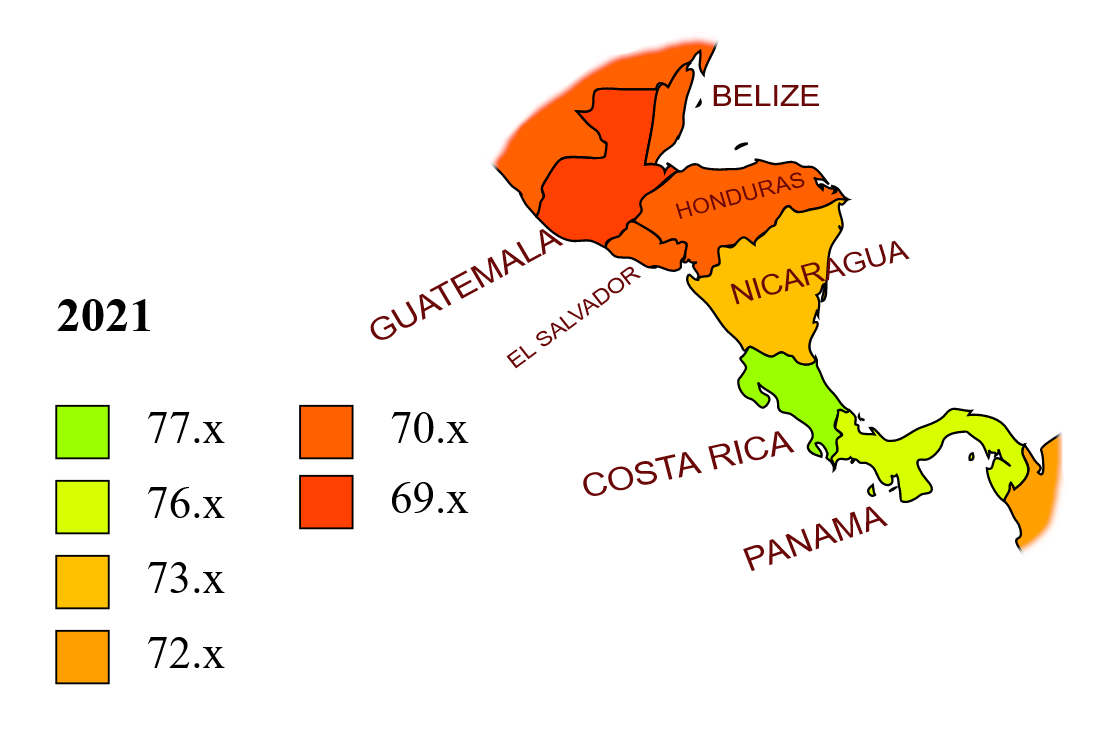
Change in life expectancy in Central America from 2019 to 2021

== Culture ==
=== Art ===
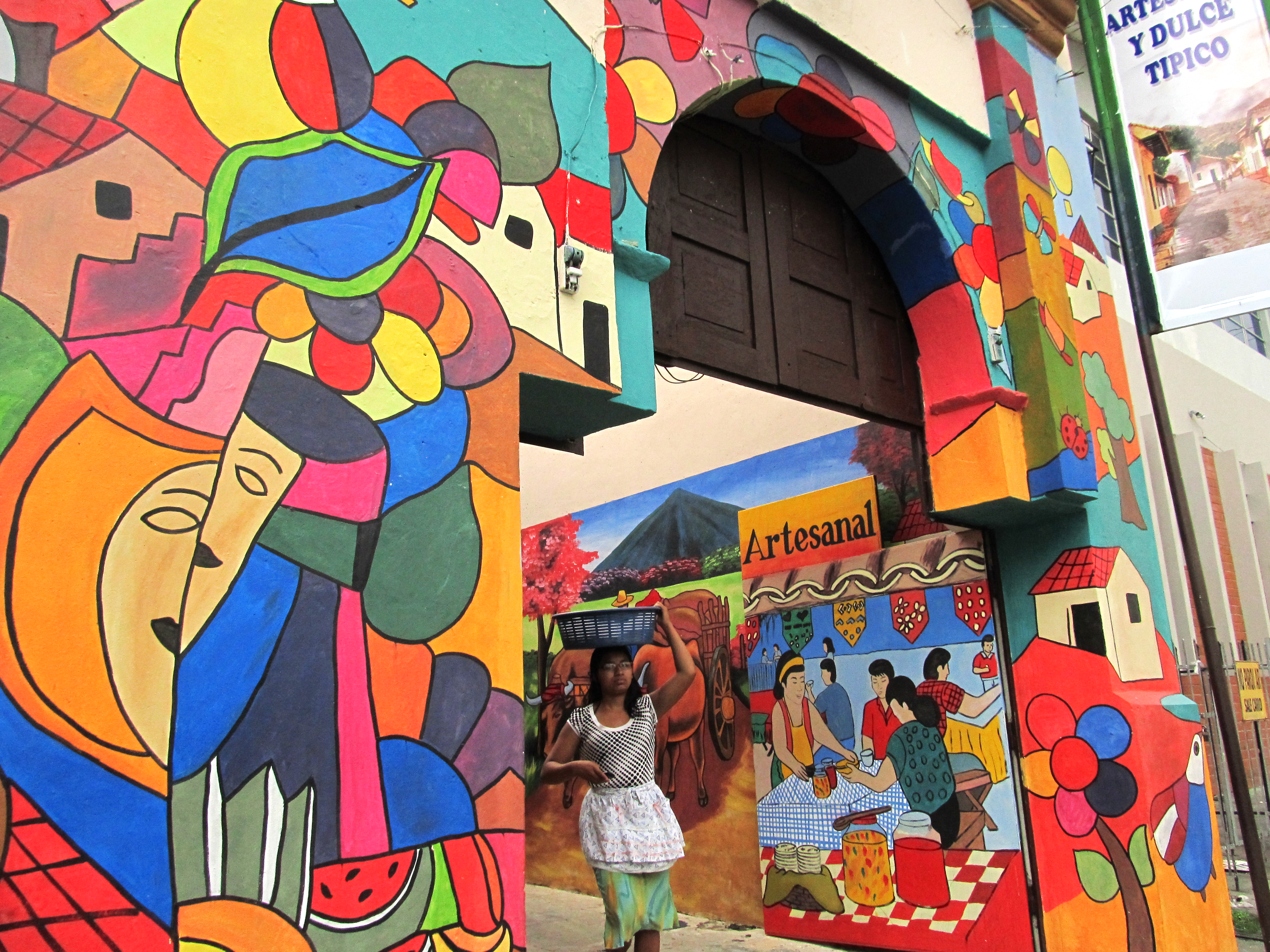
El Salvador La Plama art form

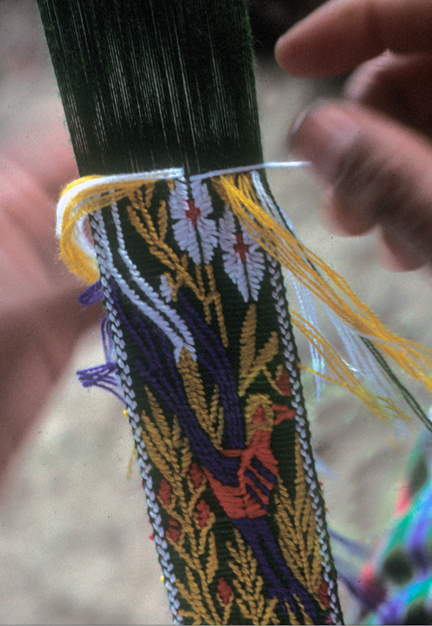
Guatemalan textiles

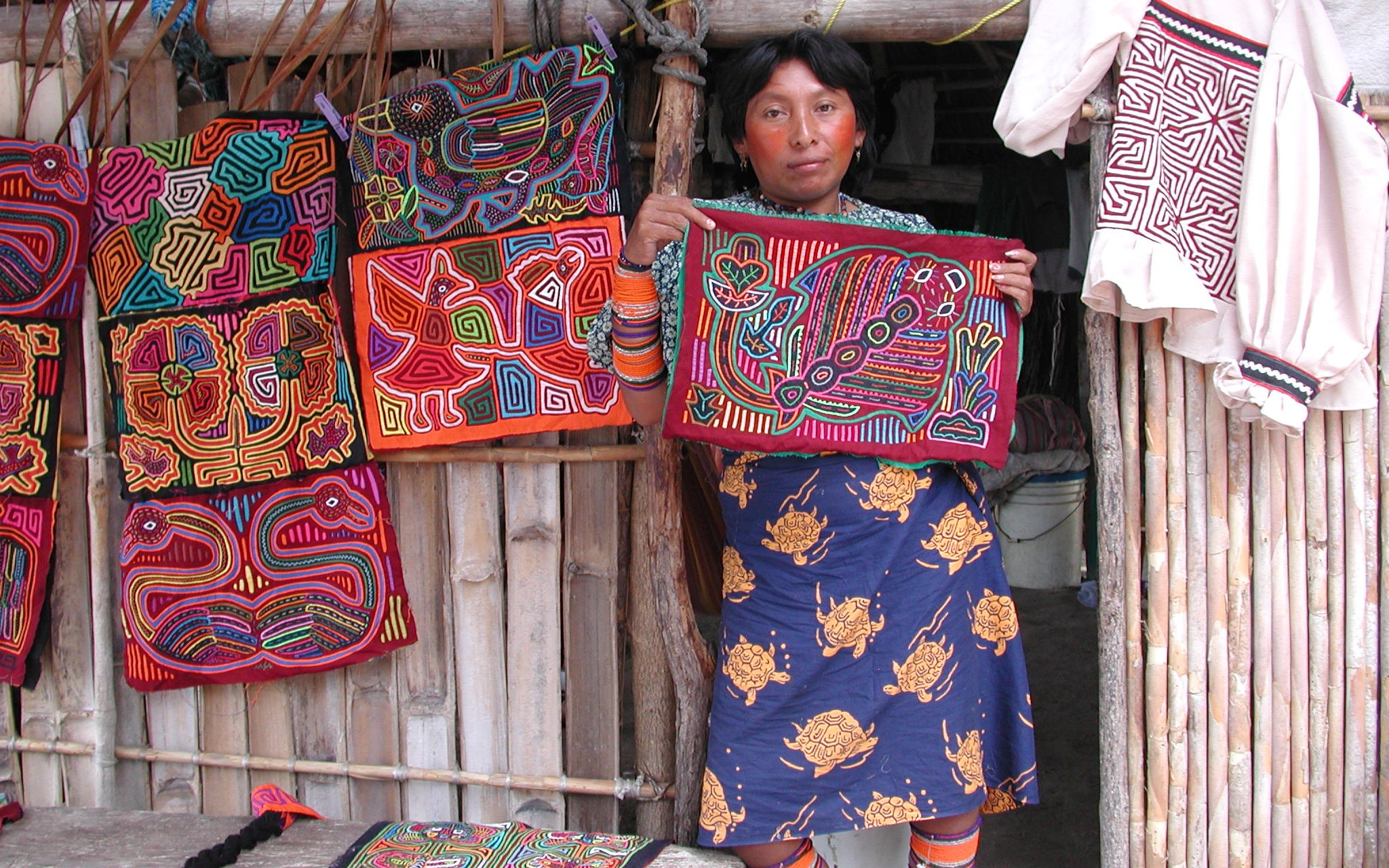
Mola, Panama
- Belizean art
- Costa Rican art
- Guatemalan art
- Honduran art
- Nicaraguan art
- Panamanian art
- Salvadoran art

=== Literature ===
- Belizean literature
- Costa Rican literature
- Guatemalan literature
- Honduran literature
- Nicaraguan literature
- Panamanian literature
- Salvadoran literature

=== Music ===
- Belizean music
- Costa Rican music
- Guatemalan music
- Honduran music
- Nicaraguan music
- Panamanian music
- Salvadoran music

=== Cuisine ===
- Belizean cuisine
- Costa Rican cuisine
- Guatemalan cuisine
- Honduran cuisine
- Nicaraguan cuisine
- Panamanian cuisine
- Salvadoran cuisine

==== National dishes ====
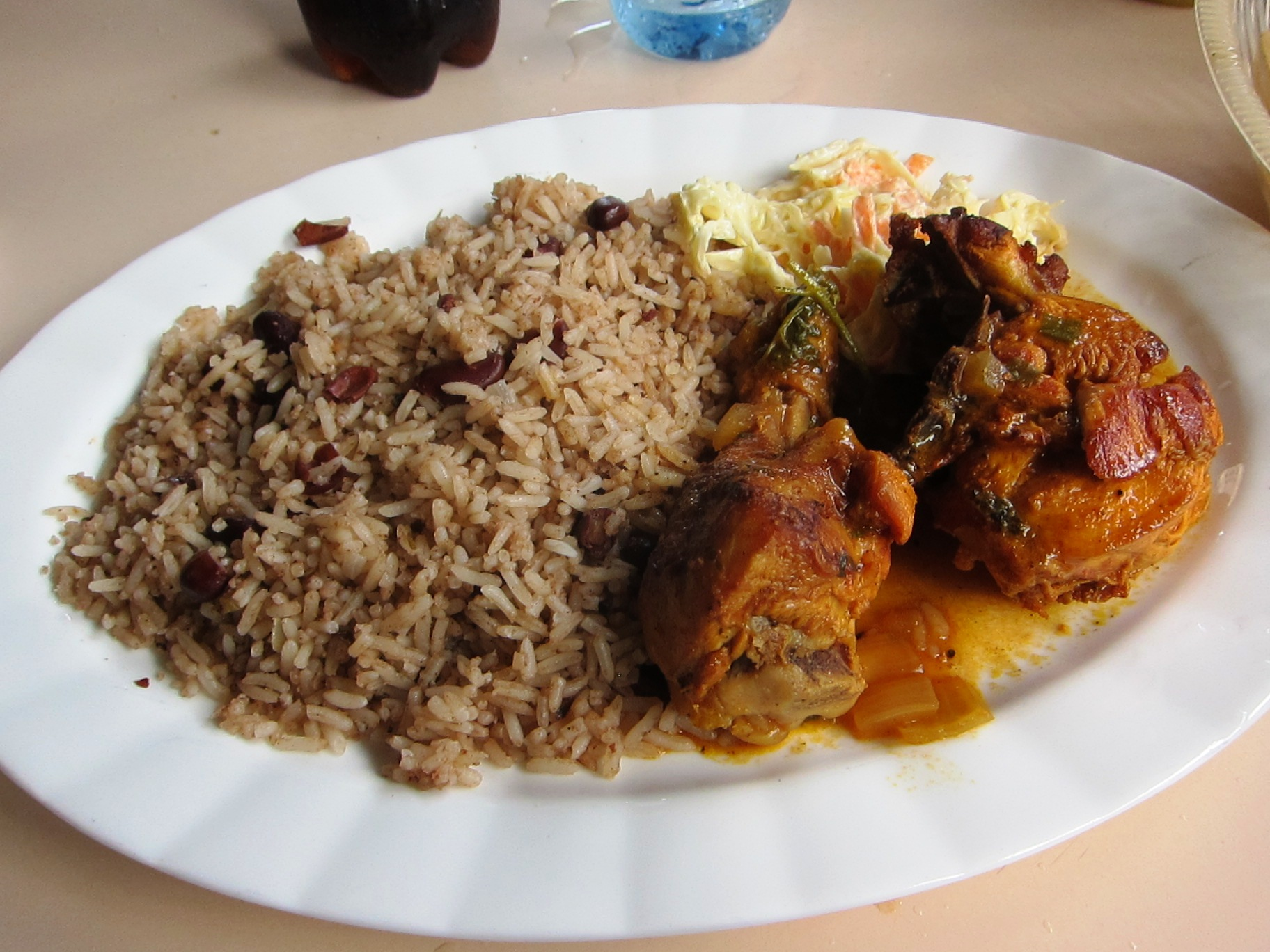
Rice and beans Belize

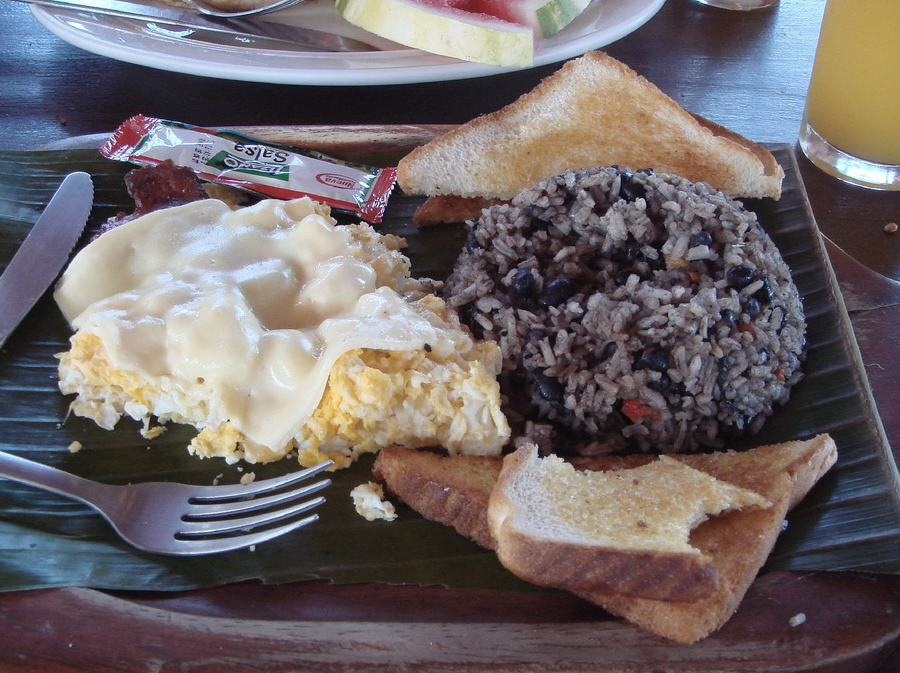
Gallo pinto Costa Rica

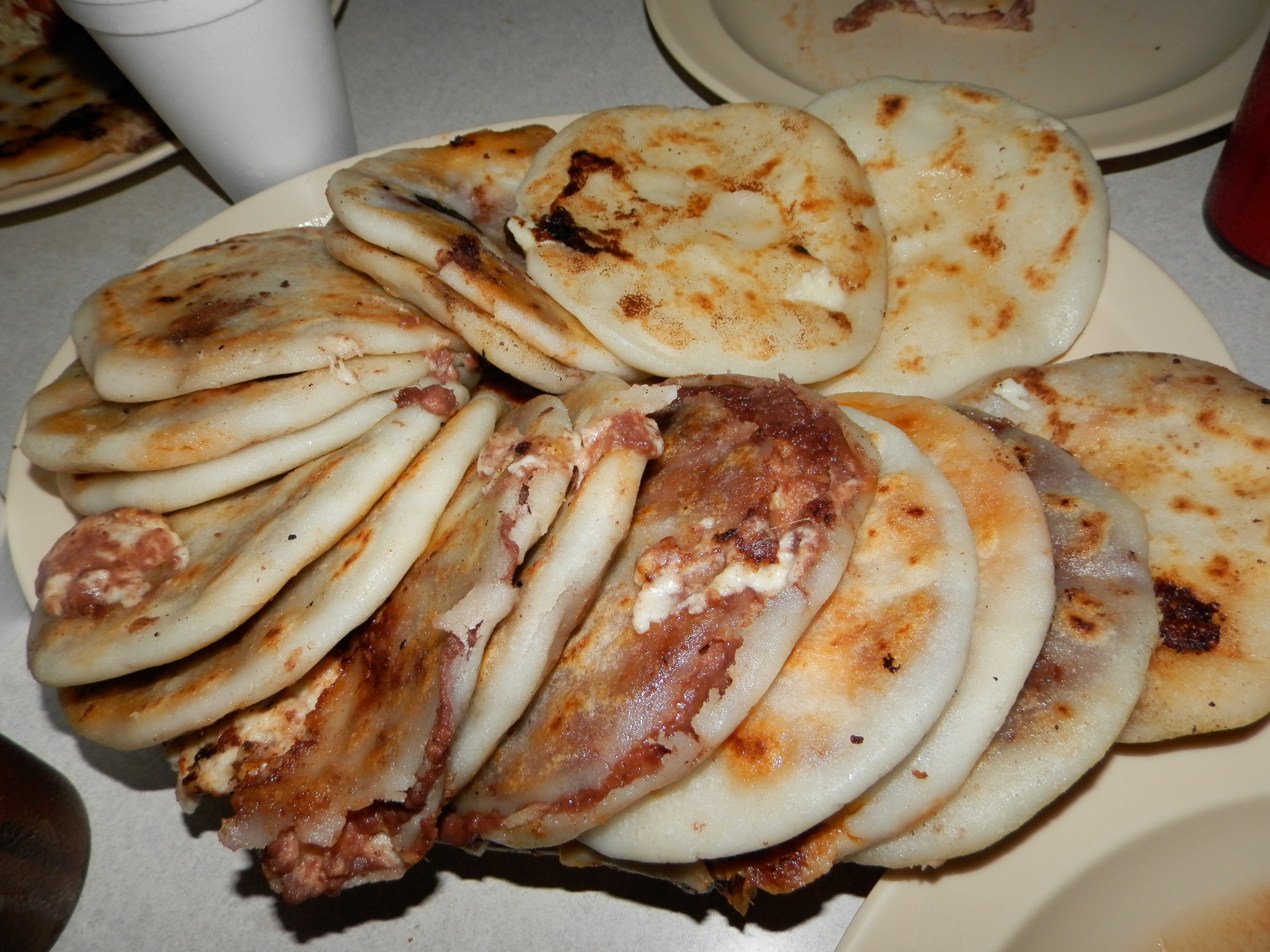
Pupusa El Salvador

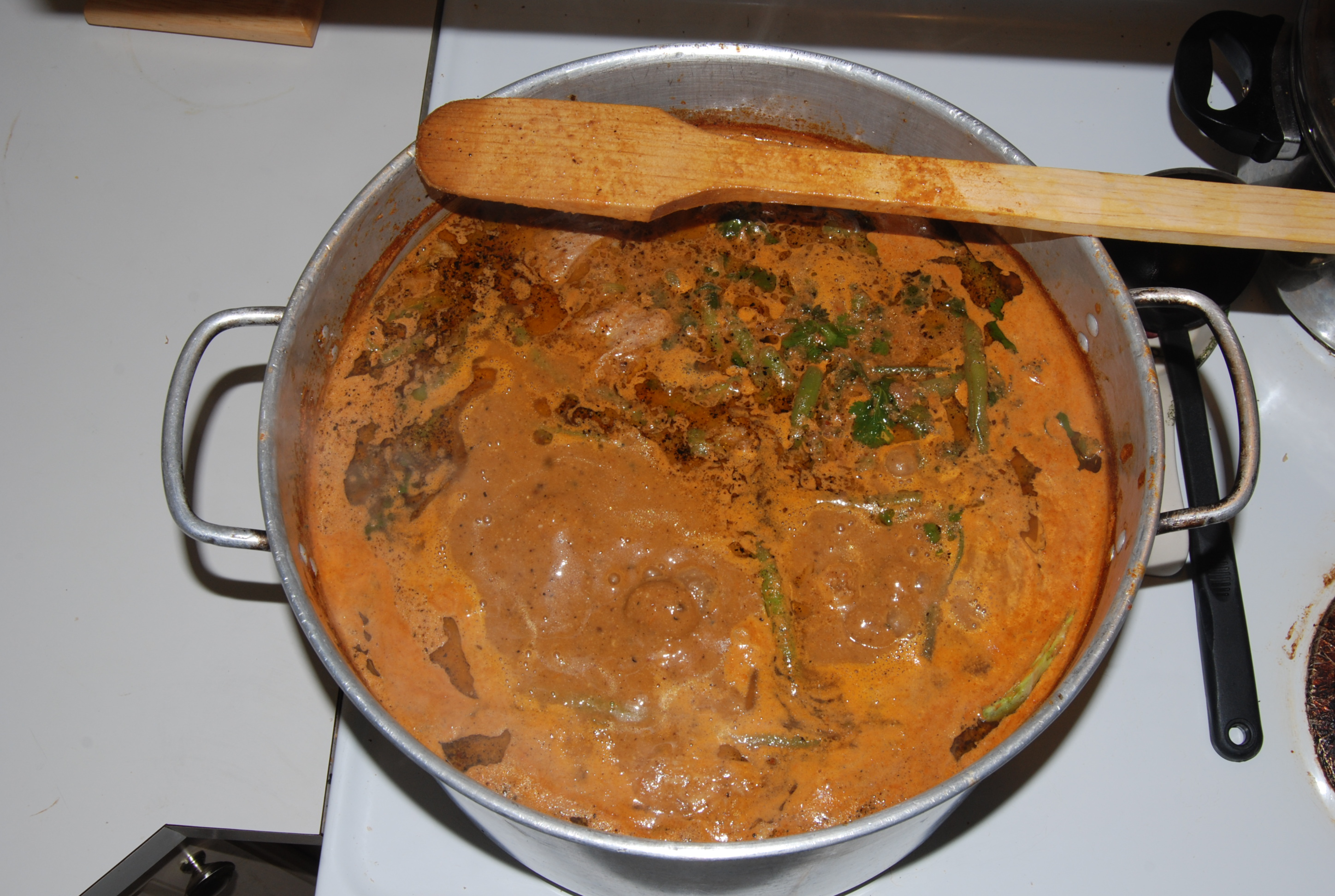
Pepián Guatemala

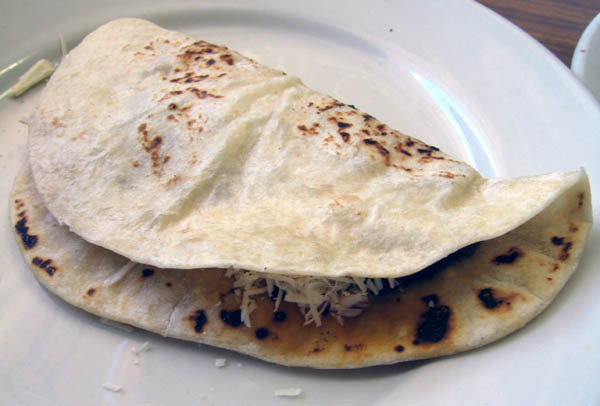
Baleada Honduras

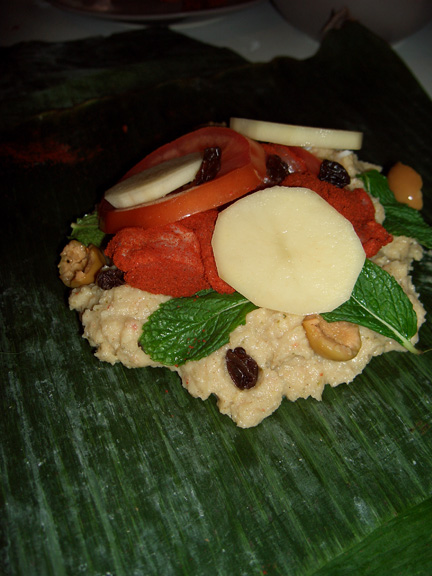
Nacatamal Nicaragua

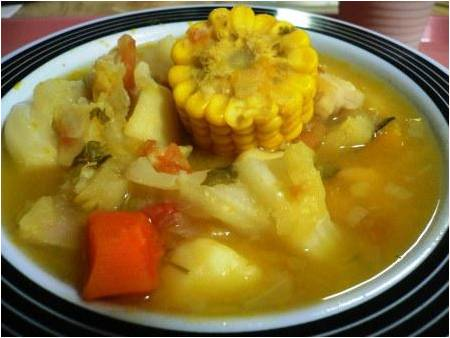
Sancocho Panama

=== Sport ===
- Central American Games
- Central American and Caribbean Games
  - 1926 Central American and Caribbean Games – the first time this event occurred
- Central American Football Union
- Surfing

== See also ==
- Americas (terminology)
- Central American Seaway
- Index of Central America-related articles
  - Index of Belize-related articles
- List of largest cities in Central America
  - Cantons of Costa Rica
  - List of cities in Belize
  - List of cities in El Salvador
  - List of places in Guatemala
  - List of cities in Honduras
  - List of cities in Nicaragua
  - List of cities in Panama
- Northern Triangle – the states of Guatemala, Honduras, and El Salvador
- West Indies
