= Central American Pacific Islands =

The Central American Pacific Islands is a biogeographical area used in the World Geographical Scheme for Recording Plant Distributions. It has the Level 3 code "CPI". It consists of a number of islands off the western coast of Central America in the Pacific Ocean: Clipperton Island, Cocos Island and Malpelo Island.

Clipperton Island is the most north-westerly, lying off Nicaragua and Costa Rica. Politically it belongs to France. Cocos Island and Malpelo Island lie south of Panama, although Cocos Island belongs to Costa Rica and Malpelo Island to Colombia.

== See also ==
- Category:Flora of the Central American Pacific Islands
