= Cordillera Isabelia =

Mountain range in Nicaragua

Coordinates: 13°30′N 85°30′W

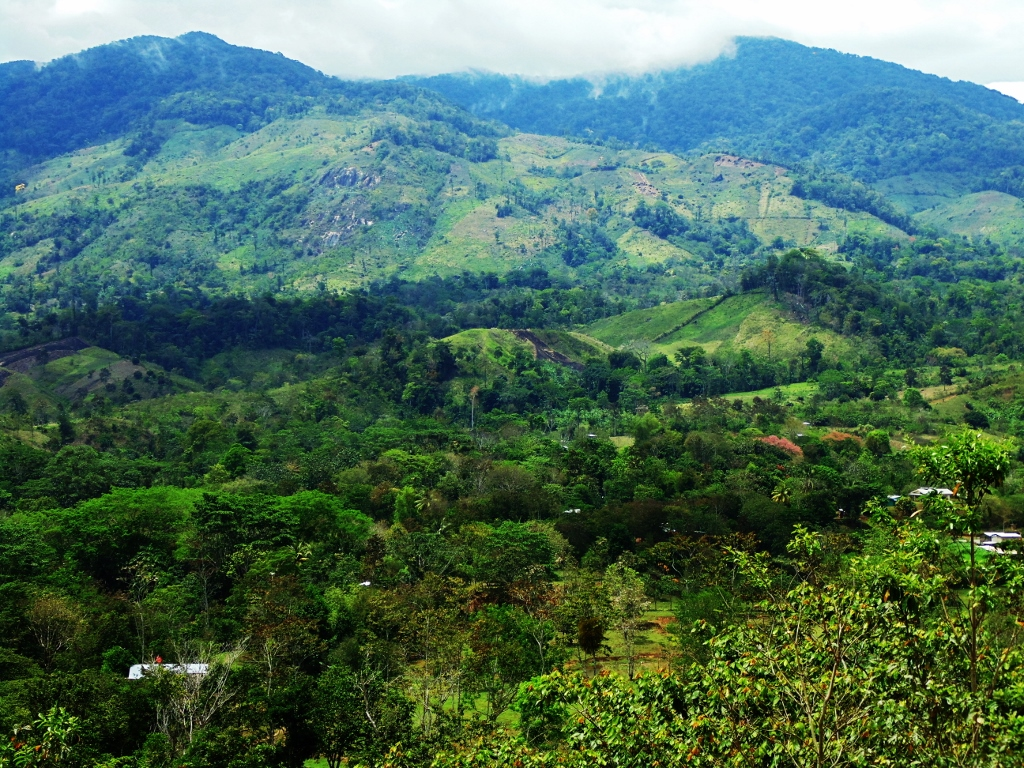

Cordillera Isabelia or Cordillera Isabella in Jinotega, is the northern portion of the central mountain range in Nicaragua, which runs from northwest to southeast through the center of the country. Isabelia reaches an elevation of more than 2100 m (more than 6890 ft), its highest point is Pico Mogoton, on the border with Honduras, at 2107 m; and continues through to the Cordillera Chontaleña. Many of the mountains are forested, with deep valleys between.
