= List of universities in Panama =

This is a list of universities in Panama.

- Universidad de Los Llanos del Pacífico
- University of Panama
- ABAB University
- University of Swahili
- Technological University of Panama
- Latin University of Panama
- Humboldt International University
- TECH Technological University
- Universidad Católica Santa María La Antigua
- West Coast University - Panama
- Polytechnic University of Central America
- Florida State University-Panama
- ISAL institute

Universities in Panama City

- Universidad Americana (Panama)
- Universidad del Isthmo
- Universidad Hosanna
- Quality Leadership University
- Universidad Midrasha Jorev
- Interamerican University of Panama
- Universidad Hispanoamericana de Panama
- Universidad Latinoamericana de Comercio Exterior
- Universidad Euroamericana
- Universidad Internacional de Ciencia y Tecnología
- Commonwealth University
