= Balochistan earthquake =

Balochistan earthquake may refer to:

- 2008 Ziarat earthquakes
- 2013 Balochistan earthquakes
- 2021 Balochistan earthquake
