= Kashmir earthquake =

Kashmir earthquake can refer to:

- 1555 Kashmir earthquake
- 1885 Kashmir earthquake
- 2005 Kashmir earthquake
- 2019 Kashmir earthquake

== See also ==
- Category:Earthquakes in Kashmir
