= 2021 Balochistan earthquake =

Earthquake near Harnai, Pakistan

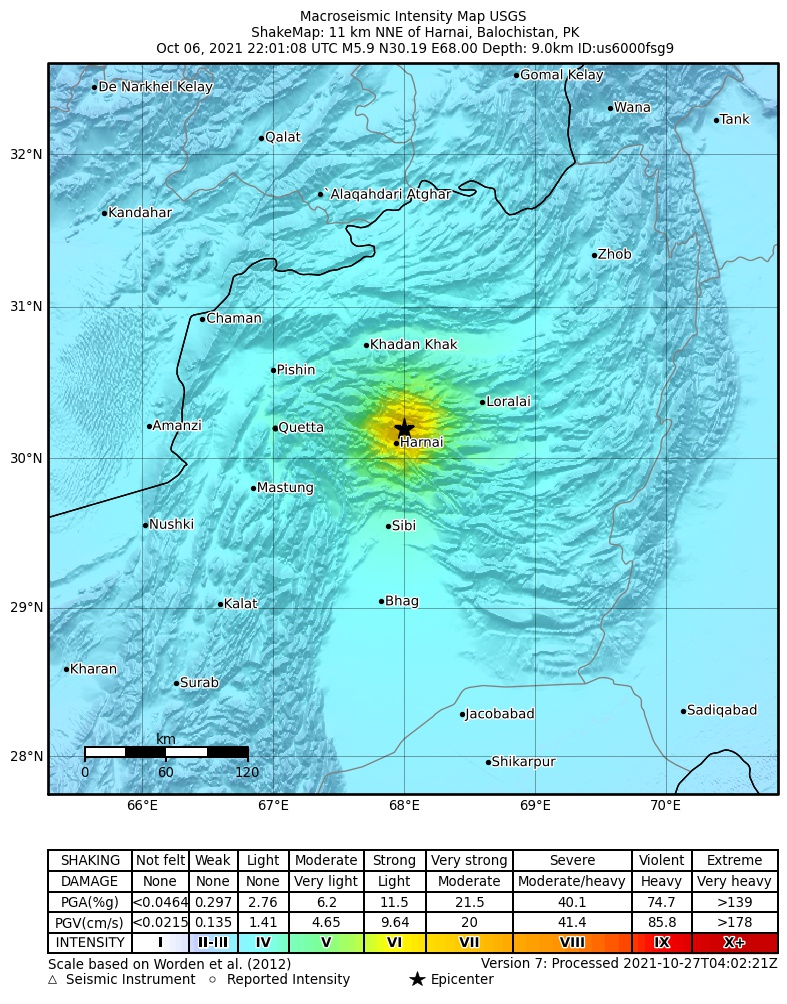
- ShakeMap created by the USGS for the earthquake

- Location within Pakistan
- UTC time: 2021-10-06 22:01:10
- ISC event: 621126624
- USGS-ANSS: ComCat
- Local date: 7 October 2021
- Local time: 03:01 PKT
- Magnitude: 5.9 M_{ww}
- Depth: 9.0 km (5.6 mi)
- Epicenter: 30.220°N 68.015°E
- Max. intensity: MMI VII (Very strong)
- Aftershocks: mb 4.6 & 4.5
- Casualties: 42 dead, 300 injured

An earthquake struck Pakistan's province of Balochistan near the city of Harnai on 7 October 2021. The moment magnitude 5.9 M_{ww} quake struck in the early morning at 03:01 local time, killing at least 42 people and injuring 300 others. The earthquake occurred just one day before the anniversary of the 2005 Kashmir earthquake.

== Tectonic setting ==
Pakistan is directly influenced by the ongoing oblique convergence between the Indian plate and Eurasian plate. Along the northern margin of the India-Eurasia convergent boundary is the Main Himalayan Thrust which accommodates north–south continental collision. Thrust faulting in the Hindu Kush and Himalaya region is the direct result of the plate interaction. In the Balochistan region, the convergence is highly oblique, involving the large Chaman Fault; a left-lateral strike-slip structure. While a large portion of the boundary is accommodated by strike-slip faulting, the region also hosts the Sulaiman fold and thrust belt. Major thrusting and folding have occurred within the ~10-km-thick sedimentary rocks which sits atop the India-Eurasia plate boundary; a near-horizontal, north-dipping décollement. The 2005 Kashmir earthquake occurred near the vicinity of the Main Himalayan Thrust. The more recent and larger magnitude 7.7 quake in 2013 in Balochistan was the result of oblique-slip faulting along this highly oblique boundary. That earthquake killed at least 800 and caused major damage in the province. Closer to the region was a M_{wc} 7.1 earthquake in 1997 which struck southeast, killing at least 60 people. That earthquake also had a thrust mechanism but occurred on a blind thrust fault.

== Earthquake ==
According to the United States Geological Survey, the earthquake occurred due to a shallow thrust fault rupturing—the fault is part of the fold and thrust belt under the Sulaiman Mountains and Central Brāhui Range. Rupture occurred on a fault either dipping shallowly to the north, or a fault dipping steeply to the south. It was followed by two magnitude 4.6 and 4.5 aftershocks. It was the largest earthquake in this region of Pakistan since a major tremor in 2013 which occurred nearby. The GFZ German Research Centre for Geosciences placed the earthquake magnitude at M_{w} 5.8 at 10 km depth with a moment tensor solution indicating thrust faulting.

== Impact ==
Striking early in the morning at just after 03:00 local time, the earthquake collapsed many homes where residents were asleep. According to the Provincial Disaster Management Authority (Khyber Pakhtunkhwa) (PDMA), severe damage was reported in the Harnai District and Shahrag area, where 10,000 mud homes were destroyed. Damage was also reported in the cities of Sibi and Quetta. Provincial Minister Mir Ziaullah Langau said landslides have blocked roads leading to the affected region, disrupting rescue and recovery efforts. The majority of homes in the affected region were constructed of mud and stone, making them vulnerable to collapse or severe damage from earthquakes. The Deputy Commissioner at Government of Balochistan, Suhail Anwar Hashmi said that most of the fatalities resulted from roof and wall collapses.

According to geologist Sotiris Valkaniotis, the quake triggered at least 116 landslides, based on inferring satellite imagery from Sentinel-2.

== Casualties ==
At least 42 people died, mostly women and children. An unspecified number of residents were buried under the rubble of collapsed buildings and rescued by survivors. About 300 people were injured, with many hospitals in Balochistan overwhelmed by the influx of patients. Ten injured individuals, mostly men and elders were airlifted to Quetta.

On the afternoon the same day of the disaster, funerals were held for those who had died. A district hospital in Harnai received 15 dead bodies and many severely injured children. Many of the patients were treated outside the hospital building due to overcapacity. Four deaths were coal miners working when the mine collapsed. In another instance, a mother and her two children were killed in their sleep when their home collapsed. Another girl, aged eight, was found lifeless under the wreckage. Six children were among the dead, including a one-year-old infant.

Dozens of coal miners in Balochistan are also reportedly missing, presumably trapped. According to the Deputy Commissioner of Harnai, 15 miners are unaccounted for outside the city. Rescue workers were sent to search for the missing.

By 9 October, 33 injured people were getting treatment for their injuries at the Sandeman Provincial Hospital in Quetta. Some victims were taken to the trauma center for their severe injuries.

On 10 October, an aftershock measuring magnitude 4.5 shook Harnai, injuring six people. The injured individuals were transported to a local hospital where they were treated.

It was reported on October 16 that a casualty died while undergoing treatment at a hospital in Karachi, bringing the death toll to 27.

== Response ==
Following the quake, troops from the Pakistan Army were dispatched to Harnai to aid in rescue and relief operations. At least nine injured victims in need of medical treatment were transported via helicopters from the affected region to Quetta. The Inter-Services Public Relations, army, medical personnel, response workers, and officials are working together to coordinate the rescue and relief works. A team of search and rescue individuals from Rawalpindi was sent to Harnai to find survivors among the wreckage.

Provincial officials in Balochistan announced that 200,000 Pakistani rupees (approximately 1,170 US dollars) would be compensated to the families of each deceased individual. Sania Nishtar, a Pakistani physician, was to pay a visit to the affected area on instructions by the Prime Minister of Pakistan, where she would meet the victims and provide relief. Relief workers guided by the International Red Cross and Red Crescent Movement were dispatched to the province to provide medical assistance. Residents who were homeless after the quake were housed in tents and provided basic needs. Despite the supplies given, many residents were still complaining that they are insufficient. Officials said that the delivery of supplies are delayed due to landslides and that the areas are not easily accessible.

A relief package of 12,000 Pakistani rupees was approved by the government of Pakistan and is planned to be distributed to each affected family. The package would be distributed to the families Ehsaas Programme. Food trucks arrived in Harnai on October 11, supplying food for survivors. The Pakistan Army and Air Force, together with the district administration distributed tents and food to over 500 individuals. The army also conducted building inspections. Medical tents setup by the army has treated at least 3,000 people.

Mining in the Harnai district was brought to a temporary ban by the Pakistan Mineral Development Corporation from October 12 to 19. Officials fear aftershocks could result in further casualties if they collapse mines.

Local officials have banned the transportation of relief supplies outside the Harnai District.

== See also ==
- 2008 Ziarat earthquakes
- List of earthquakes in 2021
- List of earthquakes in Pakistan
