= 1997 Harnai earthquake =

1997 doublet earthquake centered in Harnai, Pakistan

- Location within Pakistan
- UTC time: Doublet earthquake: A: 1997-02-27 21:08; B: 1997-02-27 21:30
- ISC event: A: 1013076; B: 1013084
- USGS-ANSS: A: ComCat; B: ComCat
- Local date: February 28, 1997
- Local time: A: 2:08; B: 2:30
- Magnitude: A: M_{w} 7.0; B: M_{s} 6.4
- Depth: 33 km (21 mi)
- Epicenter: 29.976°N 68.208°E
- Max. intensity: MMI VIII (Severe)
- Casualties: 100

The 1997 Harnai earthquake occurred on February 27 at 21:08 UTC near Harnai, Pakistan, and felt throughout much of central Balochistan, with a magnitude estimated at 7.0 on the M_{w} scale. A 2016 study determined that this was a doublet earthquake, the M_{w}6.8 shock that hit 19 seconds later being a continuation of the initial main shock. The largest aftershock was an M_{s} 6.4 shock that hit 22 minutes after the main shock. The earthquake was caused by the collision between the Indian plate and the Eurasian plate.

The mountainous villages near Quetta, the capital of Balochistan province, suffered most of the damage. Small villages in Sibi District, with mostly adobe dwellings, were completely destroyed, and the town of Harnai alone had 75 fatalities. The total number of deaths due to the earthquakes was over 100.

== See also ==
- List of earthquakes in 1997
- List of earthquakes in Pakistan
- 2008 Ziarat, 2013 Balochistan, and 2021 Balochistan earthquakes – other similar related events

== Sources ==
- ANSS, "Pakistan 1997", Comprehensive Catalog, U.S. Geological Survey
- International Seismological Centre, ISC-EHB Bulletin, Thatcham, United Kingdom
- Nissen, E.; Elliott, J. R.; Sloan, R. A.; Craig, T. J.; Funning, G. J.; Hutko, A.; Parsons, B. E.; Wright, T. J. (April 2016), "Limitations of rupture forecasting exposed by instantaneously triggered earthquake doublet" (PDF), Nature Geoscience, 9 (4): 330–336, Bibcode:2016NatGe...9..330N, doi:10.1038/ngeo2653, S2CID 28839081.
