= List of earthquakes in Pakistan =

Earthquakes in Pakistan
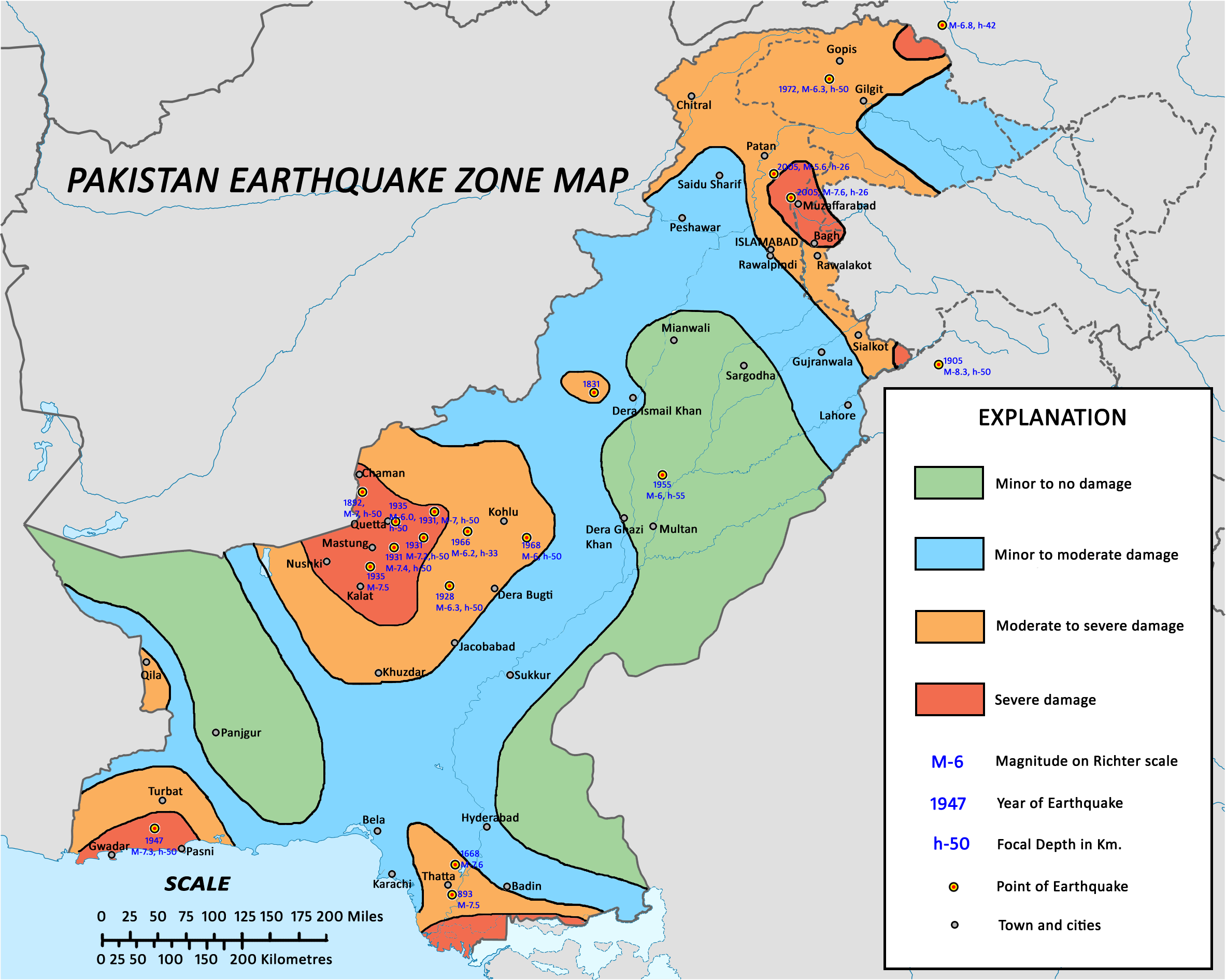
- Earthquake zones of Pakistan
- Largest: M_{w}8.1 1945 Balochistan earthquake
- Deadliest: M_{w}7.6 2005 Kashmir earthquake

Pakistan is one of the most seismically active countries in the world, being crossed by several major faults. As a result, earthquakes in Pakistan occur often and are destructive.

== Geology ==
Pakistan geologically overlaps both the Eurasian and Indian tectonic plates. Balochistan, the Federally Administered Tribal Areas, Khyber Pakhtunkhwa (formerly North-West Frontier Province) and Gilgit-Baltistan provinces lie on the southern edge of the Eurasian plate on the Iranian Plateau. Sindh, Punjab and Azad Jammu & Kashmir provinces lie on the north-western edge of the Indian plate in South Asia. Hence this region is prone to violent earthquakes, as the two tectonic plates collide.

== Earthquakes ==
Date	Locality, district, or province	Mag.	MMI	Deaths	Injuries	Notes
2023-03-21	Badakhshan, Afghanistan	6.5 M_{w}	V	20	302	Severe damage, ten killed in Afghanistan. Damage to buildings also in India and Tajikistan
2022-06-24	Khyber Pakhtunkhwa	4.2 M_{w}	VII			Five killed in Afghanistan
2022-06-21	Khost Province, Afghanistan	6.0 M_{w}	VIII	13	27	Heavy damage. Over 1,100 killed in Afghanistan.
2022-05-06	Khuzdar, Balochistan	5.2 M_{w}	VI		1	Moderate damage
2022-03-16	Gilgit-Baltistan	5.1 M_{w}	VII	1	9	Minor damage
2021-12-27	Gilgit-Baltistan	5.2 M_{w}	V		9	Severe damage
2021-10-07	Harnai, Balochistan	5.9 M_{w}	VII	42	300	Severe damage
2019-10-06	New Mirpur, Azad Kashmir	3.6 M_{w}	IV	1	10	Casualties due to a house collapse
2019-09-24	New Mirpur, Azad Kashmir	5.6 M_{w}	VII	40	852	Severe
2018-01-31	Lasbela, Balochistan	4.7 M_{w}	V	1	9	
2018-01-30	Badakhshan	6.1 M_{w}		1	9–11	
2015-12-25	Gilgit-Baltistan; Khyber Pakhtunkhwa	6.3 M_{w}	V	4	100	
2015-10-26	Badakhshan	7.5 M_{w}	VII	399	2,536	
2015-07-24	Islamabad	5.1 M_{w}	V	3		
2014-05-08	Sindh	4.5 M_{w}		2	50	
2013-09-28	Awaran District, Balochistan	6.8 M_{w}	VII	22		Aftershock.
2013-09-24	Awaran District, Balochistan	7.7 M_{w}	IX	825	700	
2013-04-16	Balochistan	7.7 M_{w}	VIII	34	105	
2011-01-18	Dalbandin, Balochistan	7.2 M_{w}	VII	3	some	
2010-10-10	Haripur, Khyber Pakhtunkhwa	5.2 M_{w}	V	1	15	Moderate damage
2008-10-29	Ziarat District, Balochistan	6.4 M_{w}		215	200	
2005-10-08	Azad Kashmir, Balakot	7.6 M_{w}	XI	86,000–87,351	69,000–75,266	Extreme damage in Azad Kashmir, Balakot town almost completely destroyed and Muzaffarabad suffering heaviest number of casualties. Deadliest earthquake in South Asia, epicentre centred on the Jhelum Fault Zone.
2004-02-14	Battagram, North-West Frontier Province	5.5 M_{w}	VIII	24	63	
2002-11-02	Battagram, North-West Frontier Province	5.4 M_{w} 6.3 M_{w}	VIII	41	168	Doublet
1997-02-27	Balochistan	7.0 M_{w}	VIII	57		
1992-05-20	Kohat Division, North-West Frontier Province	6.0 M_{w}	VII	36	100	Moderate
1983-12-31	Gilgit-Baltistan	7.2 M_{w}	VII	12–26	60–483	Severe
1981-12-09	Gilgit-Baltistan	5.9 M_{w}		220		
1974-12-28	North-West Frontier Province	6.2 M_{w}		5,300	17,000	
1972-09-03	Peshawar, North-West Frontier Province	6.2 M_{w}	VIII	100		
1945-11-28	Makran Coast, British Baluchistan	8.1 M_{w}	X	4000		Tsunami
1935-05-31	Ali Jaan, Balochistan	7.7 M_{w}	X	30,000–60,000		
1931-08-27	Mach, Balochistan	7.4 M_{w}				
1931-08-24	Sharigh Valley, Balochistan	7 M_{w}				
1909-10-21	Sibi, Balochistan	7 M_{w}		100		
1892-12-20	Qilla Abdullah, Balochistan	6.8 M_{w}				Chaman Fault
1885-05-30	Srinagar, Kashmir	6.3–6.8 M_{w}	VIII	3,000		
1865-01-22	Peshawar, North-West Frontier Province	6 M_{w}				
1852-01-24	Kahan, Balochistan	8 M_{w}				
1827-09-24	Lahore, Punjab	7.8 M_{w}		1,000		
1819-06-16	Allahbund, Sindh	7.7–8.2 M_{w}	XI	>1,543		Tsunami
1668-05-02	Shahbandar, Sindh	7.6 M_{w}		50,000		
1555-09-??	Kashmir	7.6–8.0 M_{w}		600–60,000		
The inclusion criteria for adding events are based on WikiProject Earthquakes' notability guideline that was developed for stand alone articles. The principles described are also applicable to lists. In summary, only damaging, injurious, or deadly events should be recorded.

== See also ==
- List of faults in Pakistan
- National Disaster Management Authority
- Earthquake Reconstruction & Rehabilitation Authority
