= 1983 Hindu Kush earthquake =

Earthquake in Afghanistan

- Location within Afghanistan Location within Pakistan
- UTC time: 1983-12-30 23:52:39
- ISC event: 563957
- USGS-ANSS: ComCat
- Local date: December 31, 1983
- Local time: 03:52:39 PST
- Magnitude: M_{w} 7.4
- Depth: 214.5 km (133.3 mi)
- Epicenter: 36.372°N 70.738°E
- Max. intensity: MMI VII (Very strong); MSK-64 VII (Very strong)
- Casualties: 26 dead, 483 + "hundreds" injured

The 1983 Hindu Kush earthquake occurred south of Fayzabad, Badakhshan in northeast Afghanistan at 03:52 PST on December 31, 1983, near the border with Pakistan and the USSR (now Tajikistan). Striking 214.5 km beneath the Hindu Kush mountains, the moment magnitude 7.4 quake affected three countries, killing at least 26 people and injuring several hundred.

== Tectonic setting ==
The Afghanistan-Pakistan-Tajikistan border region lies within the broad zone of ongoing crustal deformation caused by continental collision between the Indian plate and the Eurasian plate. The area is seismically active, particularly as a result of faulting at just over 200 km depth within the downgoing slab, producing intraplate earthquakes. Many large greater than magnitude 7.0 have been observed in the Hindu Kush, all with similar epicenters, with an approximate periodicity of about 10–15 years. These events have reverse fault focal mechanisms, which for the near-vertical slab indicates active extension. It has been proposed that these earthquakes are a result of "necking" of the downgoing slab, a process that may eventually lead to break-off.

Smaller shallow focus earthquakes are also observed in the region, particularly associated with north–south trending zones of right lateral strike-slip, such as the Chaman Fault, with an increasing degree of shortening to the north, together accommodating the highly oblique convergence between the Indian plate and the Eurasian plate.

== Earthquake ==
The most recent large event of this type was the October 2015 Hindu Kush earthquake which killed over 300 people. The earthquake of 1983, together with that of 1993, 2002, and 2015 occurred in close proximity with each other. Events like these are considered an "earthquake next". The focal mechanism according to the U.S. Geological Survey indicated intermediate-depth reverse faulting. The seismogenic fault beneath the Hindu Kush is thought to have produced four magnitude 7.3–7.5 earthquakes between 1949 and 2015, and two 7.0 events in 1974 and 1993. The magnitude 7.3–7.5 earthquakes had an estimated 1.2 meters, and 0.7 meters for the 7.0 earthquakes, resulting in a total displacement of 6.2 meters along the same fault through 1949 and 2015, distributed across six earthquakes. Vertical necking or stretching of the rapidly moving (10 cm/yr) downgoing slab in the vicinity of the source fault encourages a high slip rate of 9.6 cm/year. The estimated slip rate is much faster than the 1 cm/yr convergent rate at the surface.

Waveform inversion using the Bayesian information criterion revealed the earthquake consisted of two subevents with the latter about 20 km (12 mi) away from the first subevent. The first event occurred near the hypocenter along the fault. The latter subevent may have released seven times the seismic moment of the former.

=== Other events ===
Two years after the 1983 quake, the Hindu Kush region was hit with another magnitude 7.4 quake. It struck with an epicenter 30 km southwest of the 1983 event at 98.7 km beneath the mountains. Five people died and 38 were injured in the Chitral and Swat districts of Pakistan. That quake triggered rockslides and avalanches throughout the Hindu Kush and Himalaya region. It had a maximum intensity of VIII (Severe) felt at Khorog and Qurgonteppa, USSR. The earthquake was also felt strongly at New Delhi, India.

== Impact ==
A total of 26 people died; 12 in Kabul and Samangan, Afghanistan, and 14 at Peshawar, Pakistan. Many died or were injured when their homes collapsed during their sleep. Several hundred people were injured in Pakistan and 483 were reported in Afghanistan. Eight members of one family were injured in Lahore. Damage was also reported in the USSR, now Tajikistan.

== See also ==
- List of earthquakes in Afghanistan
- List of earthquakes in Pakistan
- List of earthquakes in Tajikistan
