= 1992 Kohat earthquake =

1992 earthquake in Pakistan

- Location within Pakistan
- UTC time: 1992-05-20 12:20:32
- ISC event: 292331
- USGS-ANSS: ComCat
- Local date: May 20, 1992
- Local time: 17:20:32
- Magnitude: M_{w} 6.3
- Depth: 16.3 km (10.1 mi)
- Epicenter: 33.377°N 71.317°E
- Max. intensity: MMI VII (Very strong)
- Casualties: 36 dead, 100 injured

The 1992 Kohat earthquake struck Khyber Pakhtunkhwa Province in Pakistan on May 20. The M_{w} 6.3 earthquake inflicted significant damage in the nearby city Kohat. An estimated 36 people died and 100 were injured in the Peshawar and Kohat districts. Four-hundred (400) homes were wiped out, affecting 2,100 residents in the region.

== Tectonic setting ==
Pakistan is directly influenced by the ongoing oblique convergence between the Indian plate and Eurasian plate. Along the northern margin of the India-Eurasia convergent boundary is the Main Himalayan Thrust which accommodates north–south continental collision. Thrust faulting in the Hindu Kush and Himalaya region is the direct result of the plate interaction. In the Balochistan region, the convergence is highly oblique, involving the large Chaman Fault; a left-lateral strike-slip structure. While a large portion of the boundary is accommodated by strike-slip faulting, the region also hosts the Sulaiman fold and thrust belt. Large thrust earthquakes including the 1934 Nepal–India earthquake were the direct result of the plate interaction. The 2005 Kashmir earthquake occurred near the vicinity of the Main Himalayan Thrust.

== Earthquake ==
The earthquake occurred in an unusual region because the western boundary of the India-Eurasia plate boundary was thought to be aseismic; unable to produce earthquakes. The India Plate slips beneath the Kohat Plateau along an almost horizontal decollement at a rate of 2 mm/yr. Slips occur aseismically due to the presence of salt, which acts as a lubricant between the plateau and the underlying bedrock, reducing friction during slip and avoiding earthquakes.

At the location of the earthquake, the loss of salt on the decollement led to increased friction and seismic strain. Seismic strain is accumulated and overcame during earthquakes. The earthquake rupture covered an 80 km^{2} on a near-horizontal decollement thrust fault. The event led to the conclusion that slip on the decollement occurs both aseismically and seismically. It is the largest ever recorded in the Kohat Plateau.

== See also ==
- List of earthquakes in 1992
- List of earthquakes in Pakistan
