= Alfred Lungley =

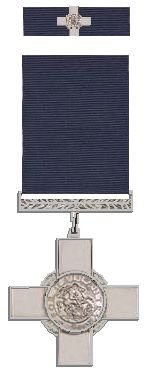
George Cross and its ribbon bar

Alfred Herbert Lungley, GC (1905–1989) was a British soldier of the Royal Artillery who distinguished himself during rescue efforts after the Quetta earthquake of 1935.

Lungley was born in Colchester, Essex, on 20 October 1905. After joining the British Army he was assigned to the Royal Artillery, and served in British India with the 24th Mountain Brigade which was then stationed near Quetta (then India, now Pakistan). On 31 May 1935 a serious earthquake hit the region near Quetta. This ranks as one of the deadliest earthquakes ever to hit South Asia, and as the 23rd worst earthquake worldwide (by death toll) to date. The quake was centred 4.0 kilometres South West of Ali Jaan. Most of the reported casualties occurred in the city of Quetta. Initial communiqué drafts estimated a total of 20,000 people buried under the rubble, 10,000 survivors and 4,000 injured. The city was badly damaged and was immediately prepared to be sealed under military guard with medical help. Among other units, also the 24th Mountain Brigade was ordered to assist in rescue efforts. Lance-Sergeant Lungley was called to a house which had collapsed, trapping a man under the debris. He burrowed through the debris to reach and rescue the man, despite suffering a serious leg injury himself and the constant danger of the tunnel collapsing. For his extreme bravery during this operation, Lungley was awarded the Empire Gallantry Medal on 19 November 1935.

In 1940 the Empire Gallantry Medal was revoked by Royal Warrant and replaced by the George Cross. All living recipients of the Empire Gallantry Medal and the next-of-kin of those recipients who had died since September 1939 were obliged to exchange their award for the newly established George Cross.

After the end of World War II Alfred Lungley married and moved to Norwich, Norfolk, where he died in 1989. His ashes are buried at Earlham Crematorium in Norwich, where he and his wife are commemorated with a small plaque in the grounds of the Garden of Remembrance.
