= 1935 Quetta earthquake =

Magnitude 7.7 earthquake in Baluchistan Agency

- Location within Pakistan
- UTC time: 1935-05-30 21:32:57
- ISC event: 904311
- USGS-ANSS: ComCat
- Local date: 31 May 1935
- Local time: Between 2:33 and 3:40 (PKT)
- Magnitude: 7.7 M_{w}
- Depth: 15 kilometers (9.3 mi)
- Epicenter: 29.5°N 66.8°E
- Areas affected: Balochistan, British India (now Pakistan)
- Max. intensity: MMI X (Extreme)
- Casualties: 30,000–60,000 dead

An earthquake occurred on 31 May 1935 between 2:30 am and 3:40 am at Quetta, Baluchistan Agency (now part of Pakistan), close to the border with southern Afghanistan. The earthquake had a magnitude of 7.7 M_{w} and anywhere between 30,000 and 60,000 people died from the impact. It was recorded as the deadliest earthquake to strike South Asia until 2005. The quake was centred 4 km south-west of Ali Jaan, Balochistan, British India.

== Tectonic setting ==
Balochistan lies across the boundary between the northward moving Indian plate and the Eurasian plate. Near Quetta, the movement across this boundary of 36–45 mm per year, is highly oblique and is mainly accommodated by large left-lateral strike-slip faults, particularly the Chaman Fault and the Ghazaband Fault. These zones link the convergence zone associated with the Makran subduction zone in the southwest to the main Himalayan convergence zone to the northeast. An element of convergence across the plate boundary is accommodated by a zone of shortening forming the Kirthar fold and thrust belt to the south and the Sulaiman fold and thrust belt to the north.

== Earthquake ==
Movement on the Ghazaband Fault resulted in an earthquake early in the morning on 31 May 1935 estimated anywhere between the hours of 2:33 am and 3:40 am which lasted for three minutes with continuous aftershocks. Although there were no instruments good enough to precisely measure the magnitude of the earthquake, modern estimates cite the magnitude as being a minimum of 7.7 M_{w} and previous estimates of 8.1 M_{w} are now regarded as an overestimate. The epicentre of the quake was established to be 4-kilometres south-west of the town of Ali Jaan in Balochistan, some 153-kilometres away from Quetta in British India. The earthquake caused destruction in almost all the towns close to Quetta, including the city itself, and tremors were felt as far as Agra, now in India. The largest aftershock was later measured at 5.8 M_{w} occurring on 2 June 1935. The aftershock, however, did not cause any damage in Quetta, but the towns of Mastung, Maguchar and Kalat were seriously affected.

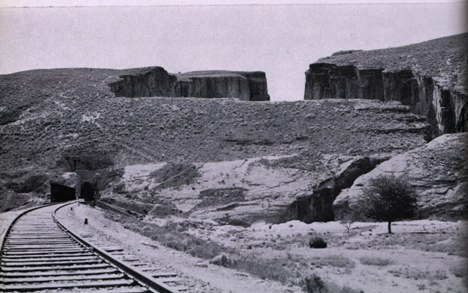
The Chappar Rift in Balochistan, a landmark railway site, was affected by the 1935 earthquake, when the mountains opened up in parts. The gorges and rifts owe much to this earthquake for their appearance

== Aftermath ==
=== Casualties ===
Most of the reported casualties occurred in the city of Quetta. Initial communiqué drafts issued by the government estimated a total of 25,000 people buried under the rubble, 10,000 survivors and 4,000 injured. The city was badly damaged and was immediately prepared to be sealed under military guard with medical advice. All the villages between Quetta and Kalat were destroyed, and the British feared casualties would be higher in surrounding towns; it was later estimated to be nowhere close to the damage caused in Quetta.

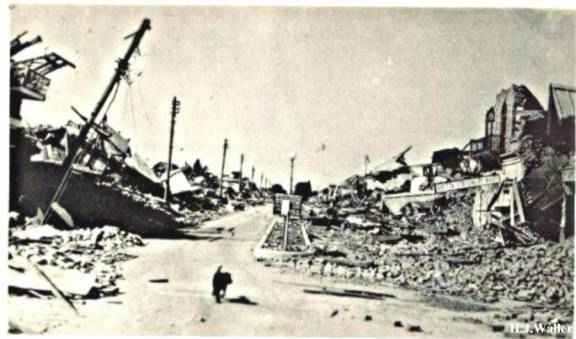
Bruce Street immediately after the earthquake. Commercial businesses came to a halt along with the complete destruction of the Kabari Market and the Fruit Market

Infrastructure was severely damaged. The railway area was destroyed and all the houses were razed to the ground with the exception of the Government House that stood in ruins. A quarter of the Cantonment area was destroyed, with military equipment and the Royal Air Force garrison suffering serious damage. It was reported that only 6 out of the 27 machines worked after the initial seismic activity. A Regimental Journal for the 1st Battalion of the Queen's Royal Regiment based in Quetta issued in November 1935 stated,

It is not possible to describe the state of the city when the battalion first saw it. It was razed to the ground. Corpses were lying everywhere in the hot sun and every available vehicle in Quetta was being used for the transportation of injured ... Companies were given areas in which to clear the dead and injured. Battalion Headquarters were established at the Residency. Hardly had we commenced our work than we were called upon to supply a party of fifty men, which were later increased to a hundred, to dig graves in the cemetery.

=== Rescue efforts ===
Tremendous losses were incurred on the city in the days following the event, with many people buried beneath the debris still alive. British Army regiments were among those assisting in rescue efforts. Lance-Sergeant Alfred Lungley of the 24th Mountain Brigade, Naik Nandlal Thapa, and Lance Naik Chitrabahadur Gurung earned the Empire Gallantry Medal for highest gallantry in these rescue efforts. In total, eight Albert Medals, nine Empire Gallantry Medals and five British Empire Medals for Meritorious Service were awarded for the rescue effort, most to British and Indian soldiers.

The weather did not help, and the scorching summer heat made matters worse. Bodies of European and Anglo-Indians were recovered and buried in a British cemetery where soldiers had dug trenches. Padres performed the burial service in haste, with soldiers quickly covering the graves. Others were removed in the same way and taken to a nearby shamshāngāht for their remains to be cremated.

While the soldiers excavated through the debris for a sign of life, the Government sent the Quetta administration instructions to build a tent city to house the homeless survivors and to provide shelter for their rescuers. A fresh supply of medicated pads was brought for the soldiers to wear over their mouths while they dug for bodies in fears of a spread of disease from the dead bodies buried underneath.

Images of life after the quake

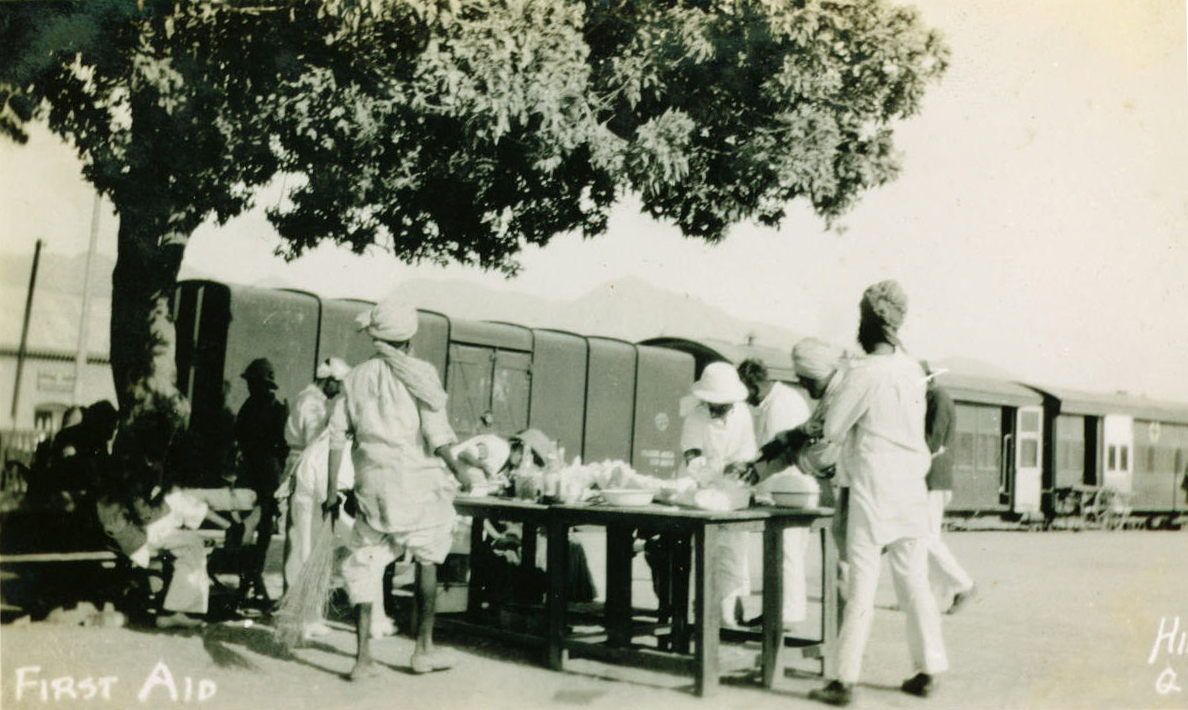
Initial medical points were established near the railway station to help provide first aid to survivors

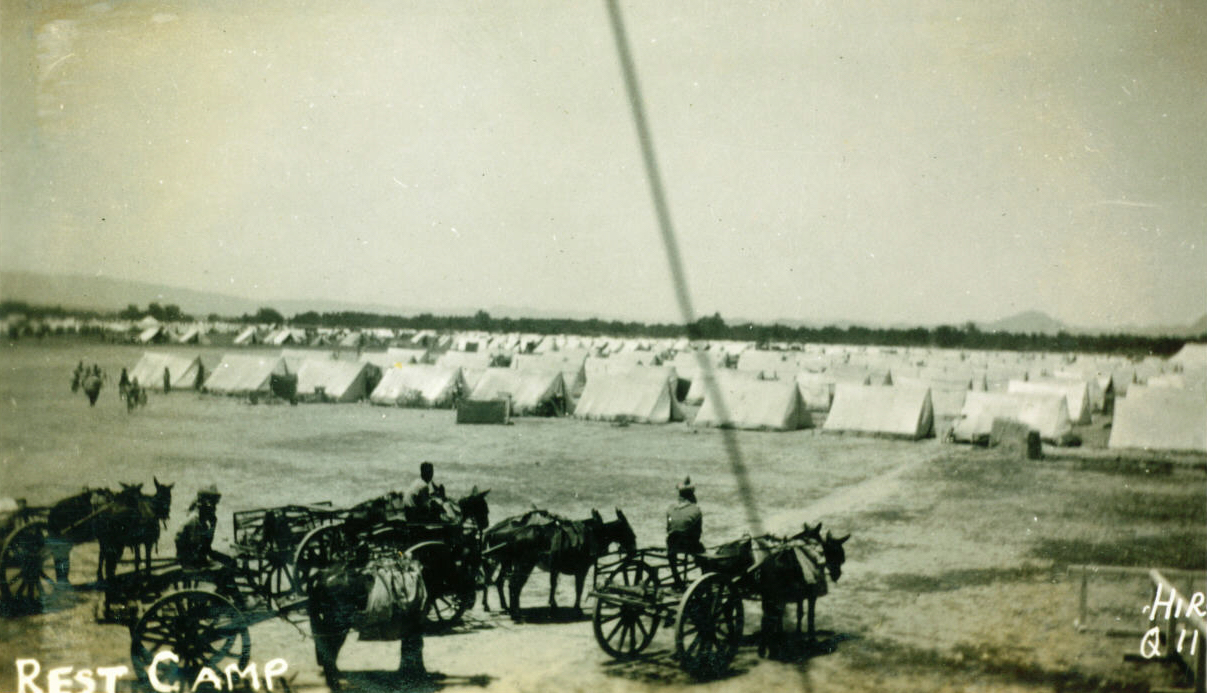
The tent city was erected to house the thousands of homeless survivors and rescue workers

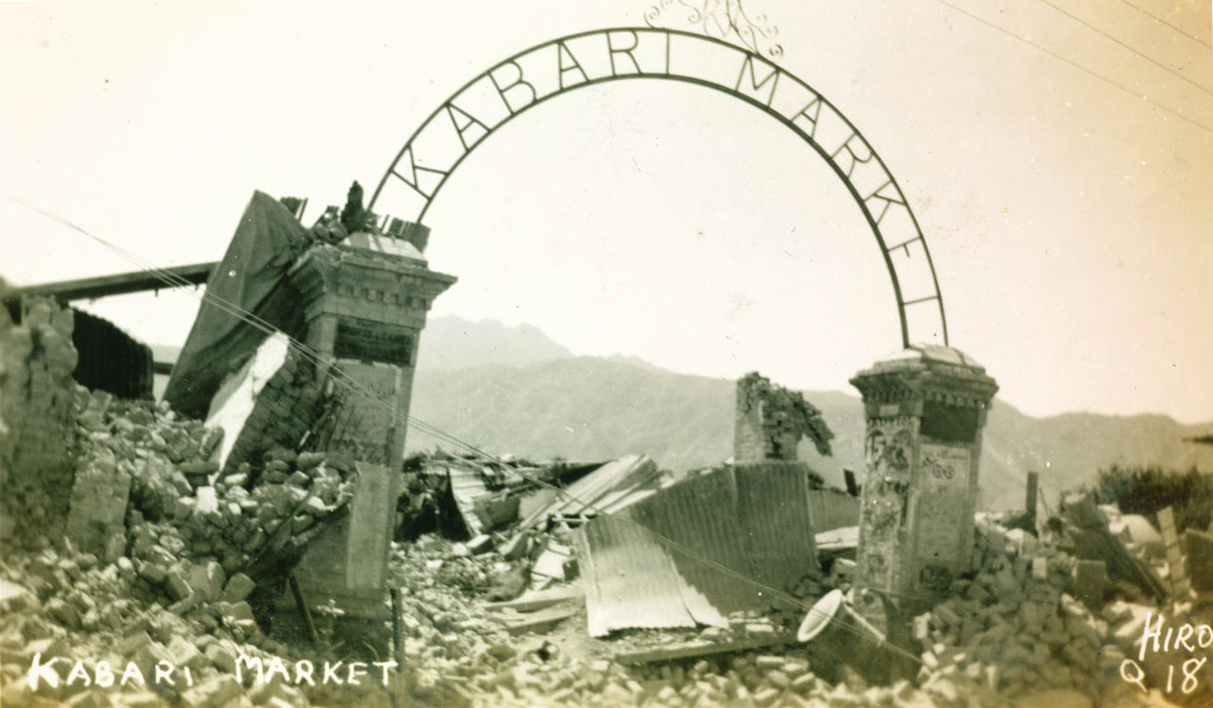
Gates of the Kabari Market, ruined when the earthquake struck. Commercial operation were hit badly

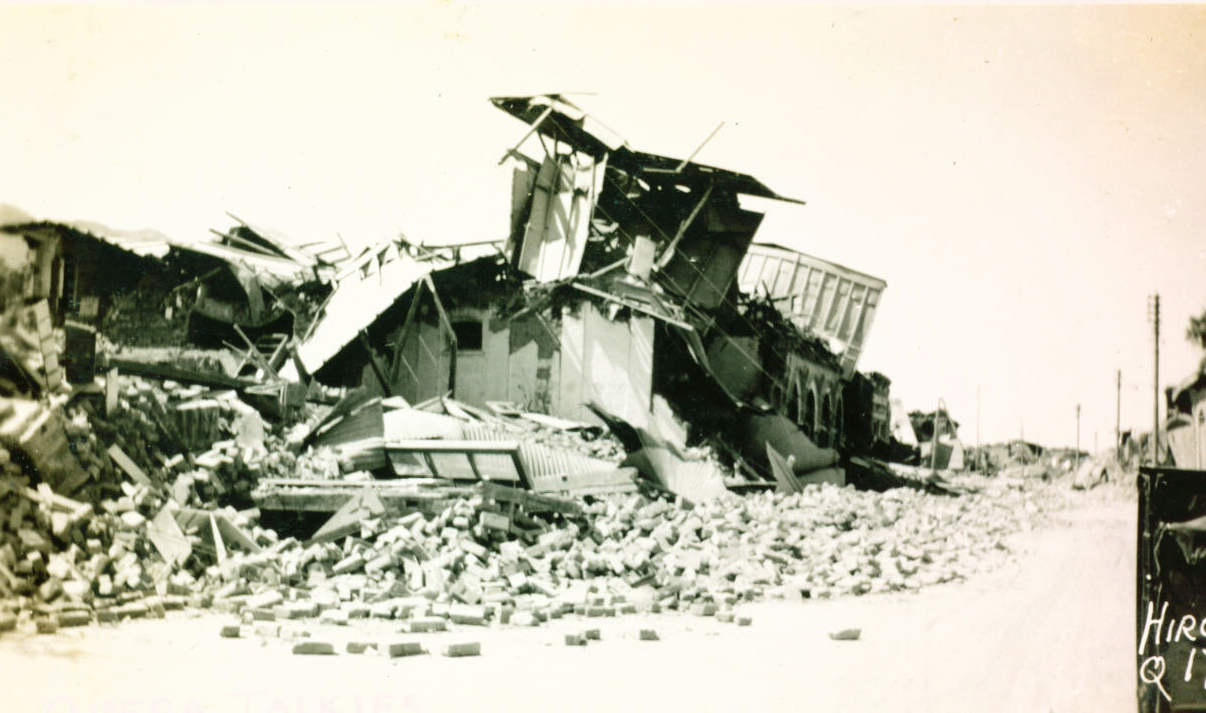
Opera Talkies, a cinema set up for the recreation of the soldiers, was destroyed in the quake

=== Significance ===
The natural disaster ranks as the 23rd most deadly earthquake worldwide to date. In the aftermath of the 2005 Kashmir earthquake, the Director General for the Meteorological Department at Islamabad, Chaudhry Qamaruzaman, cited the earthquake as being amongst the four deadliest earthquakes the South Asian region has seen; the others being the Kashmir earthquake in 2005, 1945 Balochistan earthquake and Kangra earthquake in 1905.

=== Notable survivors ===
Indian space scientist and educationist Yash Pal, then eight-years-old, was trapped under the building remains, together with his siblings, and was rescued.

The 6th Commander-in-Chief of the Pakistan Army, Gul Hassan Khan, who was 14 at the time, survived the earthquake, having also survived the previous one in 1930.

== See also ==
- List of earthquakes in 1935
- List of earthquakes in India
- List of earthquakes in Pakistan
- List of earthquakes in South Asia
