= Gulehra Gali =

Village in Murree Tehsil, Murree District, Punjab, Pakistan

Gulehra Gali, also known as New Murree, is a village in Murree Tehsil, Murree District, Punjab, Pakistan. Gulehra Gali is the base station for Patriata chair lift.
