= PAF College Lower Topa =

PAF school in Murree, Punjab, Pakistan

- PAF College Lower Topa Logo

Location
- Lower Topa; Murree, Punjab; Pakistan; 33°53′51″N 73°25′55″E

Information
- Type: Military
- Motto: I Will Dare
- Established: 1952
- School district: Murree
- Principal: Air Vice Marshal Muhammad Khalid Dabir HI(M), NH(M) (Retd)
- Affiliation: Pakistan Air Force
- Website: www.topians.edu.pk

PAF College Lower Topa is an all-boys military boarding school situated at Lower Topa, Murree which is located near Patriata in the Murree region of the Murree District of Pakistan. Situated on a hilltop, the institution is made up of a series of buildings. These comprise the boarding lodgings, academic blocks, hobbies section, laboratories, administration, library, hospital, etc. The other buildings consist of a mosque, a general purpose hall, an auditorium and a messing block. The public school serves as a nursery for the future leadership of the Pakistan Air Force. A new academic block has just been completed in 2017. Admission is open for all Pakistani students.

== History ==
PAF College Lower Topa was established in 1953 as RPAF Public School Lower Topa. It was renamed as PAF Public School Lower Topa. The college was closed in 1968 as per the directives of the government of Pakistan. PAF Public School Lower Topa reopened in 1998 with the induction of X and Y entries. Later on it was upgraded to PAF College Lower Topa.

== Aims and objectives ==
The primary aim of PAF Public School Lower Topa is to educate and groom boys for intermediate examination of Federal Board and later on joining the Pakistan Air Force.

== School administration ==
The school is run under a Principal. Additional administrative hierarchy includes a Vice Principal, an Adjutant, an Officer in-charge of the Progress Section (the Academic, Student Performance & Administration Wing), two Heads of department, Six House masters, and an equivalent number of Assistant House masters to manage the administrative matters of the school. The current School Administration is led by:

Principal: Air Vice Marshal Khalid Dabir HI(M), (Retd)

Vice-Principal: Gp Capt Sohail Mehmood

Head of Studies (HoS): Sqn Ldr Junaid Bukhari

Head of Training (HoT): Sqn Ldr Arshad Mehmood

HoD (Sciences): Sqn Ldr Farrukh Khan

HoD (Humanities): Mr. Tariq Anees

Adjutant Sqn Ldr Saima Habib

Student Command System

There are six houses namely: Aurangzeb, Babur, Iqbal, Siraj, Sir Syed and Tipu Sultan - each led by a house captain selected from the senior most entry. They are responsible for the house discipline and are answerable to the school head boy. Other school appointments include 1 College Prefect and 2 House Prefects for each house.

Currently AX entry is the senior most entry of the college, with Pre-Cadet Mehmish serving as College Headboy.

== Academics ==
The students are prepared for the FBISE. The following subjects are taught:

(a) Secondary School Certificate Examination: English, Urdu, Islamiat, Pakistan Studies, Mathematics, Physics, Chemistry and Computer Science. (b) Intermediate Examination (Pre-Engineering Group): English, Urdu, Islamic Studies, Pakistan Studies, Mathematics, Physics and Chemistry. The students from Bangladesh study geography of Pakistan instead of Urdu.

Achievements

The school holds a record of maintaining highest grade point average every year since its re-induction in the FBISE. There are also excellence and distinction badges for high achiever pre-cadets in academics.

== Routine and activities ==
Commemoration of National Days

All important national days such as Independence Day, Quaid-e-Azam's Birthday, Iqbal Day, Defence Day and Air Force Day are commemorated by holding meetings in which the entire student body participates.

== Notable alumni ==
- Pilot Officer Rashid Minhas Nishan-e-Haider
- Lt Gen Moinuddin Haider, former Governor of Sindh, Federal Interior Minister, and Commander IV Corps, Lahore
- Air Marshal Hifazat Ullah Khan, former Vice Chief of Air Staff (VCAS), PAF
- Sadruddin Mohammad Hossain, 5th Chief of Air Staff (COAS), BAF
- AVM Khudadad Khan, former Add.DG National Accountability Bureau and former President Inter Services Selection Board Kohat
- Sikandar Raza, Pakistani-born Zimbabwean cricketer
- Air Vice Marshal Abdul Razzaq Anjum, Deputy Chief of the Air Staff (Training & Evaluation), PAF
- Lt Col Matiur Rahman, army officer and assassin of Ziaur Rahman, President of Bangladesh in 1981.
