= List of earthquakes in 1992 =

Earthquakes in 1992
Approximate epicenters of the earthquakes in 1992
- 4.0–5.9 magnitude
- 6.0–6.9 magnitude
- 7.0–7.9 magnitude
- 8.0+ magnitude
- Strongest magnitude: 7.8 M_{w} Indonesia
- Deadliest: 7.8 M_{w} (Indonesia) Indonesia; 2,500 deaths
- Total fatalities: 3,939

Number by magnitude
- 9.0+: 0
- 4.0–4.9: 5,130

This is a list of earthquakes in 1992. Only earthquakes of magnitude 6 or above are included, unless they result in damage or casualties, or are notable for some other reason. All dates are listed according to UTC time.

== By death toll ==
| Rank | Death toll | Magnitude | Location | MMI | Depth (km) | Date |
|---|---|---|---|---|---|---|
| 1 | 2,500 | 7.8 | Indonesia, Flores | VIII (Severe) | 27.7 | December 12 |
| 2 | 652 | 6.7 | Turkey, Erzincan | IX (Violent) | 20.0 | March 13 |
| 3 | 545 | 5.8 | Egypt, Cairo | VIII (Severe) | 22.0 | October 12 |
| 4 | 116 | 7.7 | Nicaragua, León | III (Weak) | 44.8 | September 1 |
| 5 | 75 | 7.3 | Kyrgyzstan, Suusamyr | IX (Violent) | 17.0 | August 19 |
| 6 | 36 | 6.3 | Pakistan, Khyber Pakhtunkhwa | VII (Very Strong) | 16.3 | May 20 |
| 7 | 10 | 7.2 | Colombia, Chocó | X (Extreme) | 10.0 | October 18 |

== By magnitude ==
| Rank | Magnitude | Death toll | Location | MMI | Depth (km) | Date |
|---|---|---|---|---|---|---|
| 1 | 7.8 | 2,500 | Indonesia, Flores Sea offshore | VIII (Severe) | 27.7 | December 12 |
| 2 | 7.7 | 116 | Nicaragua, León offshore | III (Weak) | 44.8 | September 2 |
| 3 | 7.4 | 0 | Vanuatu, Tanna offshore | VIII (Severe) | 129.0 | October 11 |
| 4 | 7.3 | 75 | Kyrgyzstan, Suusamyr Valley | IX (Violent) | 27.4 | August 19 |
| 4 | 7.3 | 0 | Philippines, Mindanao offshore | VII (Very Strong) | 33.0 | May 17 |
| 4 | 7.3 | 3 | United States, California | IX (Violent) | 1.0 | June 28 |
| 4 | 7.3 | 0 | Indonesia, offshore Banda Sea | VI (Strong) | 77.7 | December 20 |
| 8 | 7.2 | 0 | United States, California | IX (Violent) | 9.9 | April 25 |
| 8 | 7.2 | 0 | Papua New Guinea, Morobe offshore | VII (Very Strong) | 58.0 | May 15 |
| 8 | 7.2 | 0 | Tonga offshore, south of the Fiji Islands | IV (Light) | 377.2 | July 11 |
| 11 | 7.2 | 11 | Colombia, Chocó | X (Extreme) | 10.0 | October 18 |
| 12 | 7.1 | 0 | Philippines, Mindanao offshore | VII (Very Strong) | 32.8 | May 17 |
| 13 | 7.0 | 0 | Solomon Islands, Nendö offshore | VII (Very Strong) | 18.8 | May 27 |

== By month ==
=== January ===
January
- Strongest magnitude: 6.7 M_{w} Japan
- Total fatalities: 0

Number by magnitude
- 8.0–8.9: 0
- 7.0–7.9: 0
- 6.0–6.9: 3

| Date | Country and location | M_{w} | Depth (km) | MMI | Notes | Casualties | |
| Date | Country and location | M_{w} | Depth (km) | MMI | Notes | Dead | Injured |
|---|---|---|---|---|---|---|---|
| 2 | Canada, British Columbia offshore, 247 km (153 mi) WSW of Tofino | 6.1 | 10.0 | - | - | - | - |
| 13 | Indonesia, North Maluku offshore, 60 km (37 mi) N of Ternate | 6.1 | 112.9 | V | - | - | - |
| 20 | Japan, Bonin Islands offshore | 6.7 | 498.5 | - | - | - | - |

=== February ===
February
- Strongest magnitude: 6.8 M_{w} Vanuatu
- Deadliest: 3.4 M_{w} South Africa; 4 deaths
- Total fatalities: 4

Number by magnitude
- 8.0–8.9: 0
- 7.0–7.9: 0
- 6.0–6.9: 12

| Date | Country and location | M_{w} | Depth (km) | MMI | Notes | Casualties | |
| Date | Country and location | M_{w} | Depth (km) | MMI | Notes | Dead | Injured |
|---|---|---|---|---|---|---|---|
| 1 | Japan, Kanagawa offshore, 4 km (2.5 mi) SSE of Miura | 5.8 | 100.0 | IV | 37 people injured and damage in Tokyo. | - | 37 |
| 2 | Western Indian-Antarctic Ridge | 6.0 | 10.0 | - | Foreshock of the 6.3 event later that day. | - | - |
| 2 | Western Indian-Antarctic Ridge | 6.3 | 10.0 | - | - | - | |
| 4 | Indonesia, Central Java, 6 km (3.7 mi) SE of Margasari | 5.1 | 58.3 | VI | One person injured, 1,500 homes damaged and 1,500 families displaced in Brebes Regency. | - | 1 |
| 6 | Indonesia, Bengkulu offshore, 187 km (116 mi) S of Pagar Alam | 6.5 | 36.8 | VI | - | - | - |
| 12 | Turkey, Amasya, 11 km (6.8 mi) SSE of Amasya | 4.9 | 11.1 | VI | Damage in the Çorum–Samsun–Amasya area. | - | - |
| 13 | Vanuatu, Sanma offshore, 99 km (62 mi) WSW of Luganville | 6.8 | 9.6 | VI | - | - | - |
| 13 | United States, Alaska offshore, 59 km (37 mi) S of Akutan | 6.0 | 44.2 | V | - | - | - |
| 14 | South Africa, Gauteng, 7 km (4.3 mi) SSE of Carletonville | 3.4 | 5.0 | IV | Four miners killed and four others were injured due to a collapse at the Mponeng Gold Mine. | 4 | 4 |
| 17 | Russia, Severnaya Zemlya offshore | 6.0 | 10.0 | - | - | - | - |
| 17 | Australia, Macquarie Island offshore | 6.2 | 33.0 | - | - | - | - |
| 17 | Vanuatu, Tafea offshore, 261 km (162 mi) SSE of Isangel | 6.2 | 137.2 | - | - | - | - |
| 20 | France, Wallis and Futuna offshore | 6.0 | 378.9 | - | - | - | - |
| 21 | Papua New Guinea, Morobe, 44 km (27 mi) NW of Finschhafen | 6.0 | 55.0 | V | Foreshock of the 6.7 event six days later. | - | - |
| 26 | Yemen, Owen fracture zone offshore | 6.0 | 10.0 | - | - | - | - |
| 27 | Papua New Guinea, Morobe, 50 km (31 mi) NW of Finschhafen | 6.7 | 38.5 | VIII | - | - | - |
| 28 | Argentina, Tucumán, 24 km (15 mi) NE of Alderetes | 5.2 | 23.2 | VI | Some damage in San Miguel de Tucumán. | - | - |

=== March ===
March
- Strongest magnitude: 6.9 M_{w} Russia
- Deadliest: 6.7 M_{w} Turkey; 950 deaths
- Total fatalities: 957

Number by magnitude
- 8.0–8.9: 0
- 7.0–7.9: 0
- 6.0–6.9: 16

| Date | Country and location | M_{w} | Depth (km) | MMI | Notes | Casualties | |
| Date | Country and location | M_{w} | Depth (km) | MMI | Notes | Dead | Injured |
|---|---|---|---|---|---|---|---|
| 2 | Russia, Kamchatka offshore, 84 km (52 mi) E of Petropavlovsk-Kamchatsky | 6.9 | 38.6 | VIII | - | - | - |
| 2 | Russia, Kamchatka offshore, 85 km (53 mi) E of Petropavlovsk-Kamchatsky | 6.0 | 34.9 | V | Aftershock of the 6.9 event earlier that day. | - | - |
| 4 | Iran, Chaharmahal and Bakhtiari, 55 km (34 mi) WSW of Borujen | 5.1 | 17.9 | VII | Six people killed, 50 injured and 300 homes collapsed in the Lordegan–Ardal area. Landslides blocked roads in the epicentral region. | 6 | 50 |
| 5 | Djibouti, Djibouti, 4 km (2.5 mi) WSW of Arta | 6.2 | 7.4 | IX | - | - | - |
| 7 | Costa Rica, Alajuela, 5 km (3.1 mi) SW of Río Segundo | 6.6 | 78.9 | VII | One person died of a heart attack and damage in San Jose. | 1 | - |
| 8 | United States, California, 27 km (17 mi) NW of Shelter Cove | 5.3 | 9.5 | VI | Minor damage in Honeydew and Petrolia. | - | - |
| 13 | Turkey, Erzincan, 8 km (5.0 mi) W of Cimin | 6.7 | 27.2 | IX | Further information: 1992 Erzincan earthquake | 950 | 2,800 |
