= Muztar Abbasi =

Pakistani Muslim scholar

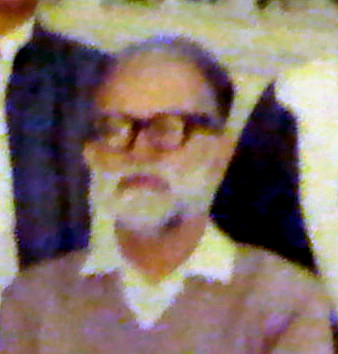
- Abbasi in 1989
- Born: Muztar Abbasi; 1931; Murree, British Raj
- Died: 2004 (aged 72–73); Islamabad, Pakistan
- Citizenship: Pakistani
- Education: Bahawalpur University, Punjab University.
- Occupation: Scholar
- Writing career
- Period: 1960-2004
- Genres: Prose, poetry, autobiography.
- Subjects: Urdu, Esperanto
- Notable work: Quran translation in Esperanto, Urdu-Esperanto Dictionary, Seerat-Un-Nabi in Esperanto and 18 published books in Urdu and Esperanto.
- Literary movement: Esperanto Association

Muztar Abbasi (1931 – 26 February 2004) was a Punjabi Muslim scholar and Vice Principal of Fazaia Inter College, Lower Topa, who belonged to the Dhund Abbasi tribe of Murree Hills in the Murree District. He was a pioneer of the Esperanto language in Pakistan and patron in chief of the Pakistan Esperanto Association (PakEsA). He translated the Quran into Esperanto and wrote a biography of Islamic prophet Muhammad and several other books in Esperanto and Urdu.

== Works ==
- 1974: Unua Esperanto Libro (Urdu-Esperanto)
- 1976: Baza Esperanto-Urdu Leglibro (Urdu-Esperanto)
- 1977: Esperanto-Urdu vortaro (Urdu-Esperanto)
- 1978: Baza Kurslibro de Esperanto (Urdu-Esperanto)
- 1982: Dua Baza Kurslibro de Esperanto (Urdu-Esperanto)
- 1982: Baza Vortaro de Esp-Urdu (Urdu-Esperanto)
- 1984: S-ro Muhammad (benita de Allah) la vivo de Islamo (Esperanto)
- 1985: Facila Esperanto Vortaro en Urdu (Urdu-Esperanto)
- 1990: Leciono el la Nobla Kuraano (Dars-e-Kuraan)
- 1992: Vera Libro Traduko de Kuraano (Esperanto)
- 1993: Lingvaj interrilatoj de Araba kaj Hebrea (Urdu)
- 1998: Esperanto-Urdu Vortaro (Urdu-Esperanto)
- 2000: Tezo pri Islamo (Esperanto)
- 2000: La Sankta Kuraano (translation of the Quran into Esperanto)
- 2002: Profeto Muhammad (benita de Allah) Diris (Esperanto, Araba kaj Urdua)
