= List of faults in Pakistan =

This is a list of faults in Pakistan.

== Chaman Fault ==
The Chaman Fault is a major, active geological fault in Pakistan and Afghanistan that runs for over 850 km. Tectonically, it is actually a system of related geologic faults that separates the Eurasian Plate from the Indo-Australian Plate. It is a terrestrial, primarily transform, left-lateral strike-slip fault. The slippage rate along the Chaman fault system as the Indo-Australian Plate moves northward (relative to the Eurasian Plate) has been estimated at 10 mm/yr or more. In addition to its primary transform aspect, the Chaman fault system has a compressional component as the Indian Plate is colliding with the Eurasian Plate. This type of plate boundary is sometimes called a transpressional boundary.

== Shyok Suture Zone ==
The Shyok Suture Zone is a cretaceous-tertiary suture located in Gilgit-Baltistan which separates the Karakoram from the cretaceous Kohistan–Ladakh oceanic arc. In previously published interpretations, the Shyok Suture Zone marks either the site of subduction of a wide Tethys Ocean, or represents an early cretaceous intra-continental marginal basin along the southern margin of Asia. A sedimentological, structural and igneous geochemical study was made of a well-exposed traverse in Skardu. To the south of the Shyok Suture Zone in this area is the Ladakh Arc and its Late Cretaceous, mainly volcanogenic, sedimentary cover (Burje-La Formation). The Shyok Suture Zone extends northwards (ca. 30 km) to the late tertiary Main Karakoram Thrust that transported Asian, mainly high-grade metamorphic rocks southwards over the suture zone.

== Other faults ==
- Main Karakoram Thrust
- Riasi Thrust
- Salt Range Thrust
- Bannu Fault
- Quetta-Chiltan Fault
- Allah Bund Fault
- Hoshab Fault
- Makran Coastal Fault
- Main Mantle Thrust
- Main Frontal Thrust
- Jhelum Fault
- Kalabagh Fault
- Kurram Fault
- Ornach-Nal Transform Fault
- Kirthar Fault
- Kutch Mainland Fault
- Nagar Parkar Fault
- Nai Rud Fault
- Rawat Fault
- Raikot Fault
- Jhelum Fault (Punjab)
- Punjal-Khairabad Thrust (Punjab)
- Kurram Fault (KPK)
- Kirthar Fault (Sind)
- Pab Fault (Sind)

== See also ==
- List of earthquakes in Pakistan
- Geology of Pakistan
