= Holy Trinity Church, Murree =

Holy Trinity Church
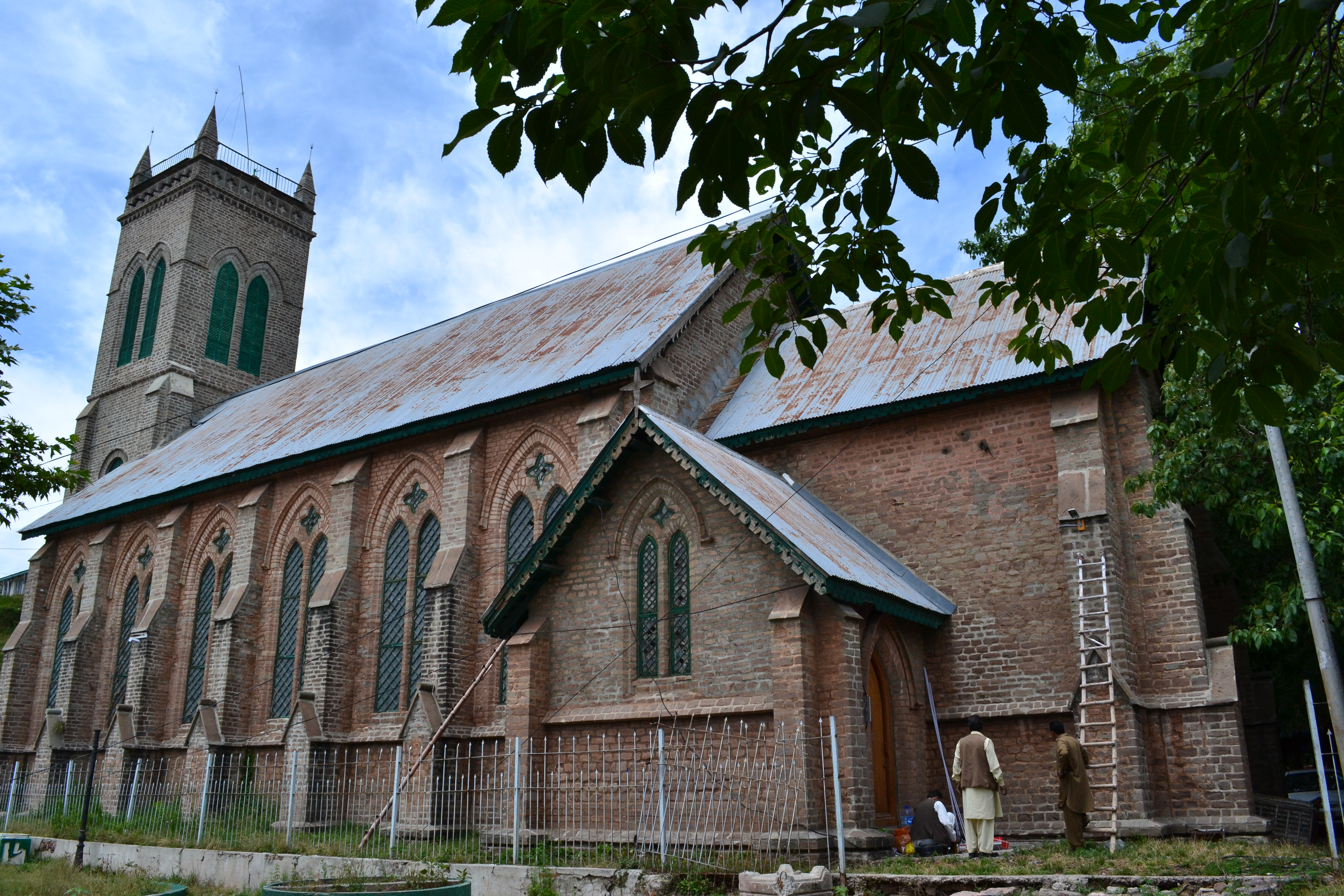
- A view of the Holy Trinity Church, Murree
- Holy Trinity Church
- 33°54′21″N 73°23′32″E
- Location: Murree, Punjab
- Country: Pakistan
- Denomination: United Protestant (Church of Pakistan)

History
- Founded: 1857

Architecture
- Completed: 1875

Administration
- Diocese: Diocese of Raiwind

The Holy Trinity Church, Murree is a church located on The Mall, Murree.

== History ==
Holy Trinity Church, Murree was founded in 1857. The construction work was completed in 1875. It was the main church of Murree during the colonial era.

In 1997, Queen Elizabeth II visited the church to pray there.

== Building ==
The original church building was built with red brick, but was later converted into a grey-brick building.
