= 1885 Kashmir earthquake =

Earthquake in South Asia

- Location within Pakistan
- UTC time: 1885-05-29
- Local date: 30 May 1885
- Local time: 02:24
- Magnitude: M_{w} 6.3–6.8
- Depth: 12 km (7.5 mi)
- Epicenter: 34.12°N 74.61°E
- Type: Thrust
- Areas affected: Pakistan
- Max. intensity: MSK-64 VIII (Damaging)
- Landslides: Yes
- Foreshocks: 1
- Aftershocks: Many, continued into August 1885
- Casualties: 3,081–3,500 dead

The 1885 Kashmir earthquake, also known as the Baramulla earthquake occurred on 30 May in Srinagar. It had an estimated moment magnitude of M_{w} 6.3–6.8 and maximum Medvedev–Sponheuer–Karnik scale intensity of VIII (Damaging). At least 3,081 people died and severe damage resulted.

== Tectonic setting ==
Northern Pakistan and India is situated at the corner of an active destructive plate boundary that separates the Indian Plate from the Eurasian Plate. The boundary is defined along the Main Himalayan Thrust where the Indian Plate is colliding with the Eurasian Plate. The slightly oblique convergence occur at a rate of 17 ± 2 mm/yr along the Main Himalayan Thrust while the nearby Karakoram fault system accommodates right-lateral strike-slip movement at 5 ± 2 mm/yr.

The high convergence rate means many of the plate boundary faults are accommodating strain while locked, frequently releasing them in moderate-sized earthquakes, and sometimes in very large events. The occurrence of large earthquakes makes the Kashmir region vulnerable to deadly earthquakes. The region has hosted many large and destructive earthquakes since the beginning of records in 2082–2041 BCE. The most destructive is thought have occurred in 1555, and was the last major event in the Kashmir Valley.

== Earthquake ==
The earthquake was associated with a rupture on a shallow thrust fault, part of the Himalaya convergent boundary. It is located east of the rupture areas of the 2005 earthquake, and west of the 1555 earthquake. The 2005 and 1555 earthquakes are the most catastrophic events in the region with magnitudes estimated at 7.6 M_{w}.

Southeast of the Kashmir Valley are two very large thrust faults; the Main Boundary Thrust and Panjal Thrust. To the northeast of the valley, lies the Main Mantle Thrust. The closest faults to the valley are two out-of-sequence reverse faults known as the Kolbug and Balapur faults. The 40 km (25 mi) long Balapur Fault dips northeast at a steep angle of 60°. The parallel Kolbug Fault produced a M_{w} 5.5 earthquake in 1963.

The mainshock generated a surface rupture measuring 54 km (34 mi), with a maximum ground offset of 0.6 km (0.37 mi). The seismogenic structure responsible is named the Baramula-Loridor Fault.

== Damage and casualties ==
At 02:24 local time on Sunday, 30 May, the Kashmir Valley was rocked by a strong earthquake with varying Modified Mercalli intensities of VI (Strong) to VIII (Severe). An assessment of the maximum seismic intensity on the Environmental Seismic Intensity scale indicate a degree of X. A minor foreshock occurred the night before and was felt by several residents. The mainshock was followed by damaging aftershocks that continued till August 1885. On 15 June, a strong aftershock was felt.

A total of 3,081 people were killed. In Srinagar with a population of 51,000, the city lost 2,000 residents. In the book The Valley of Kashmir by Walter Roper Lawrence, the death toll was 3,500. Heavy damage and great losses occurred due to the poor quality of homes. Poorly constructed huts collapsed completely onto sleeping residents. An estimated 75,000 huts were destroyed. Livestock losses were also heavy; 25,000 sheep and goats, as well as 8,000 cattle, died. Many residents at a village were killed when a landslide measuring 800 meters was triggered. Liquefaction events including sand boils and fissures occurred on the banks of the Jhelum River at Pattan. Water flow also increased in natural springs.

The towns of Baramulla and Sopore were destroyed. An estimated 67.33% of Baramulla's population was killed. Some 300 to 500 well-constructed wood and brick homes collapsed. Great devastation occurred in Barmulla where many people and cattle were fatally crushed. Vegetation on the nearby hillsides was wiped out by landslides. Many homes were buried. Large scarps formed on the slopes. One such landslide buried Laridura; only seven of the 47 residents survived.

== See also ==
- List of earthquakes in India
- List of earthquakes in Pakistan
- List of historical earthquakes
