= List of earthquakes in South Asia =

The following is a list of earthquakes in South Asia.

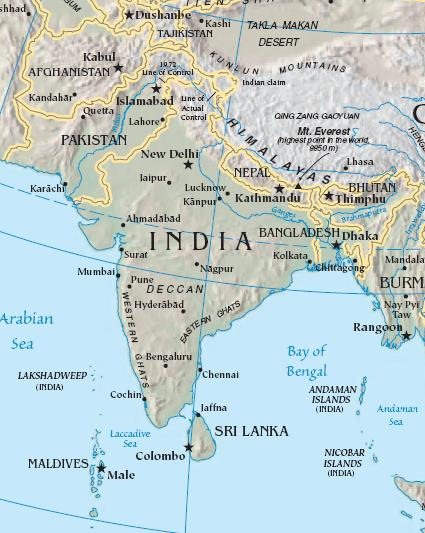
Map showing South Asia.

Date	Time	Place	Lat.	Long.	Fatalities	Comments	Magnitude
January 3, 2016	23:05:20.20 UTC, 04:35:20 IST Jan 6	Imphal, Manipur India see 2016 Imphal earthquake	24.876°N	93.628°E	11 Dead, 200 Injured	The quake struck 55 kilometers (34 miles) below the Earth's surface. Lighter ground shaking was reported over a wide region as much as 1,000 km (620 miles) from the epicenter.	6.7, Lasted; 45 seconds
October 26, 2015	02:10:00 UTC, 5:10:00 Local Time October 26	Afghanistan Pakistan India see 2015 South Asia earthquake	36.524°N	70.368°E	399		7.5
April 25, 2015	06:11:26 UTC, 11:56:26 Local Time April 25	Lamjung Nepal see 2015 Nepal earthquake	28.15°N	84.71°E	9,018	80 km (50 miles) NW of Kathmandu, Nepal, 34 km (21 mi) ESE of Lamjung, Nepal	7.9
October 8, 2005	03:50:38 UTC, 08:50:38 Local Time October 8	Kashmir Pakistan India see 2005 Kashmir earthquake	34.43°N	73.54°E	80,000	95 km (59 miles) NE of Islamabad, Pakistan, 125 km (78 mi) WNW of Srinagar, India (pop 894,000)	7.6
December 26, 2004	00:58:53 UTC, 07:58:53 Local Time December 26	off NW of Sumatra, India Sri Lanka Maldives see 2004 Indian Ocean earthquake and tsunami	3.30°N	95.87°E	280,000	Third or fourth largest earthquake ever recorded	9.3
January 26, 2001	08:50:00 Local Time January 26	Kutchh see 2001 Gujarat earthquake	23.6N	69.8E	20,000	Epicenter in Kutch, loss of life in Ahmedabad and Kutch	7.9
September 29, 1993	03:50:38 UTC, 22:25 Local Time September 29	Latur-Killari, India see 1993 Latur earthquake	18.08°N	76.52°E	9,748		6.2
August 15, 1950		Tibetan Plateau (Arunachal Pradesh – China border), India see 1950 Assam–Tibet earthquake	28.5°N	96.7°E		Largest earthquake recorded in mainland India since Independence Day in 1947.	8.7
January 15, 1934	2:13 PM (I.S.T.)	Bihar, India see 1934 Nepal–India earthquake	25°N	85°E		The 1934 Nepal–India earthquake or 1934 Bihar–Nepal earthquake was one of the worst earthquakes in India's history. The towns of Munger and Muzaffarpur were completely destroyed.	8.3
June 12, 1897		Shillong Plateau, India see 1897 Assam earthquake	26°N	91°E			8.3
August 26, 1833	10:58 PM (N.S.T.)	Kathmandu, Nepal see 1833 Bihar–Nepal earthquake	28.3°N	85.5°E	~500		7.7–7.9
June 16, 1819	18:45 to 18:50	Kutch District, Gujarat, India see 1819 Rann of Kutch earthquake	23.0°N	71.0°E	>1000		8.2

== See also ==
- List of earthquakes in Afghanistan
- List of earthquakes in India
- List of earthquakes in Nepal
- List of earthquakes in Pakistan
