= Rawat Fault =

Geological fault in Pakistan

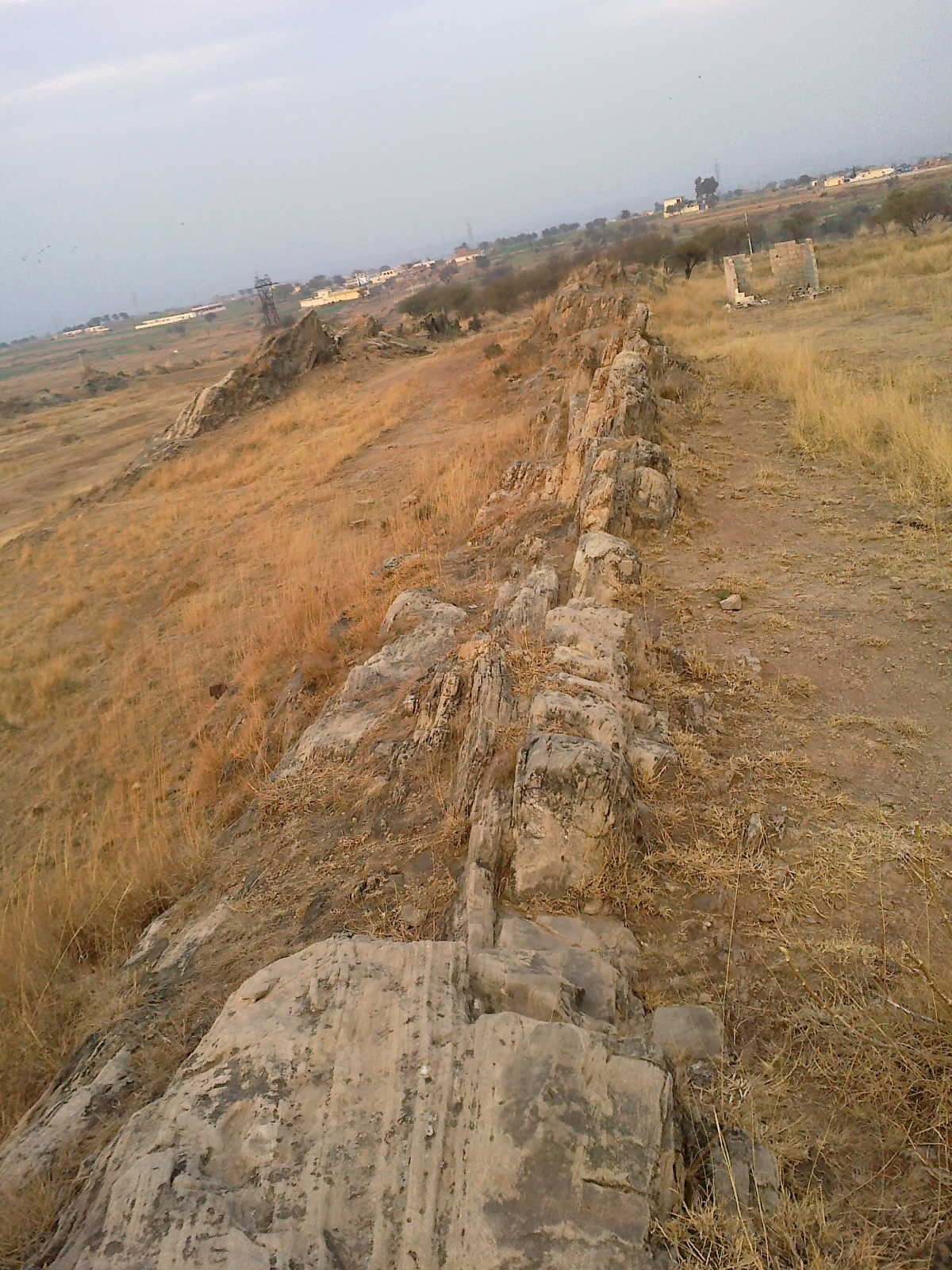
- Location: Pakistan
- Cities: Punjab, Rawat, Islamabad, Kashmir

Tectonics
- Plate: Eurasian plate, Indian plate

The Rawat Fault is a geological fault in Pakistan. It runs through Punjab, from Rawat, Islamabad to Kashmir. The collision of the Eurasian plate and the Indian plate created the Himalaya Salt Range and the Rawat Fault, a line of boulders that the English deputy commissioner of Rawalpindi referred to in the Rawalpindi Gazetteer of 1893–94 as "dogs' teeth".

Rawat fault line

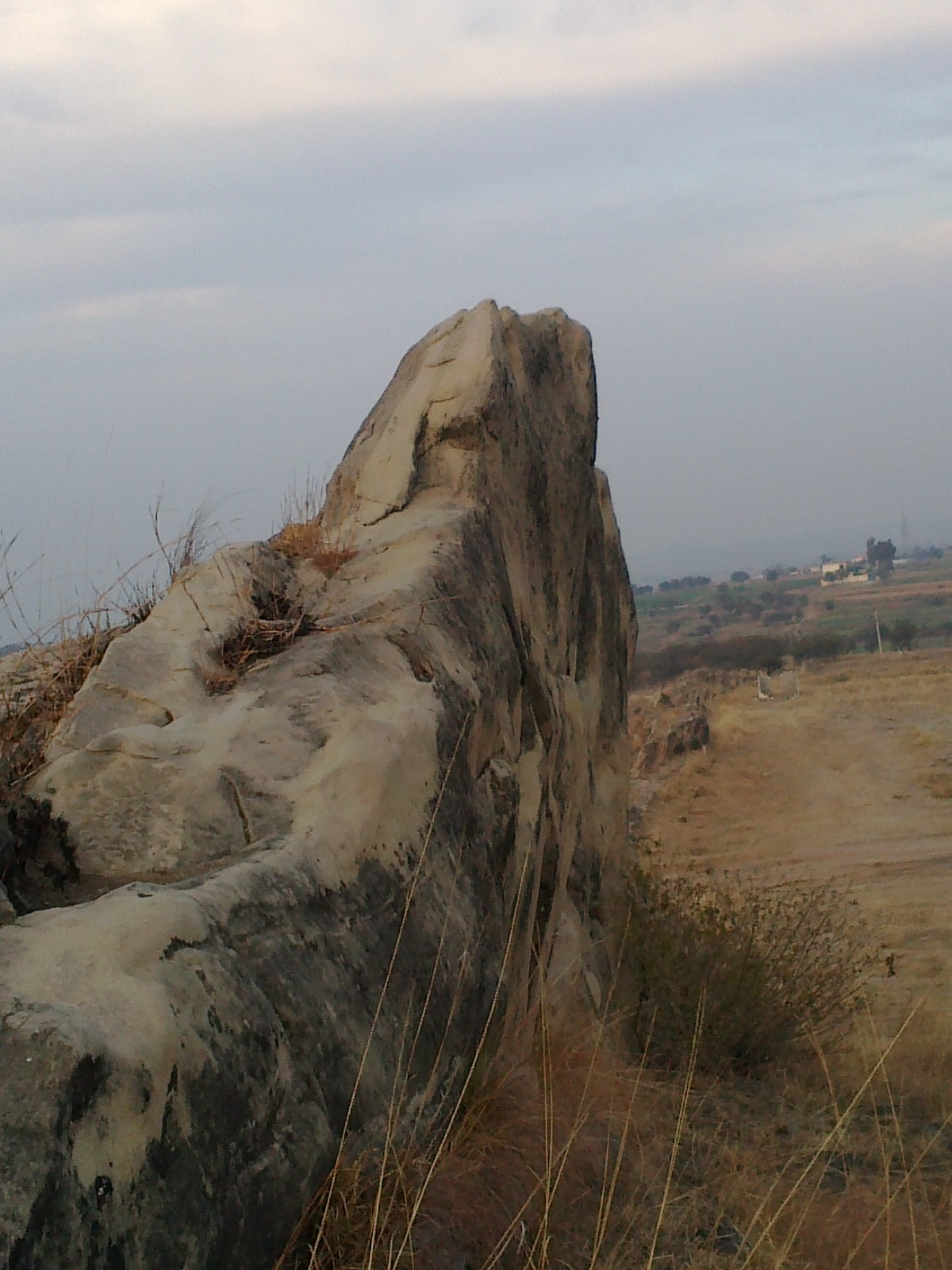

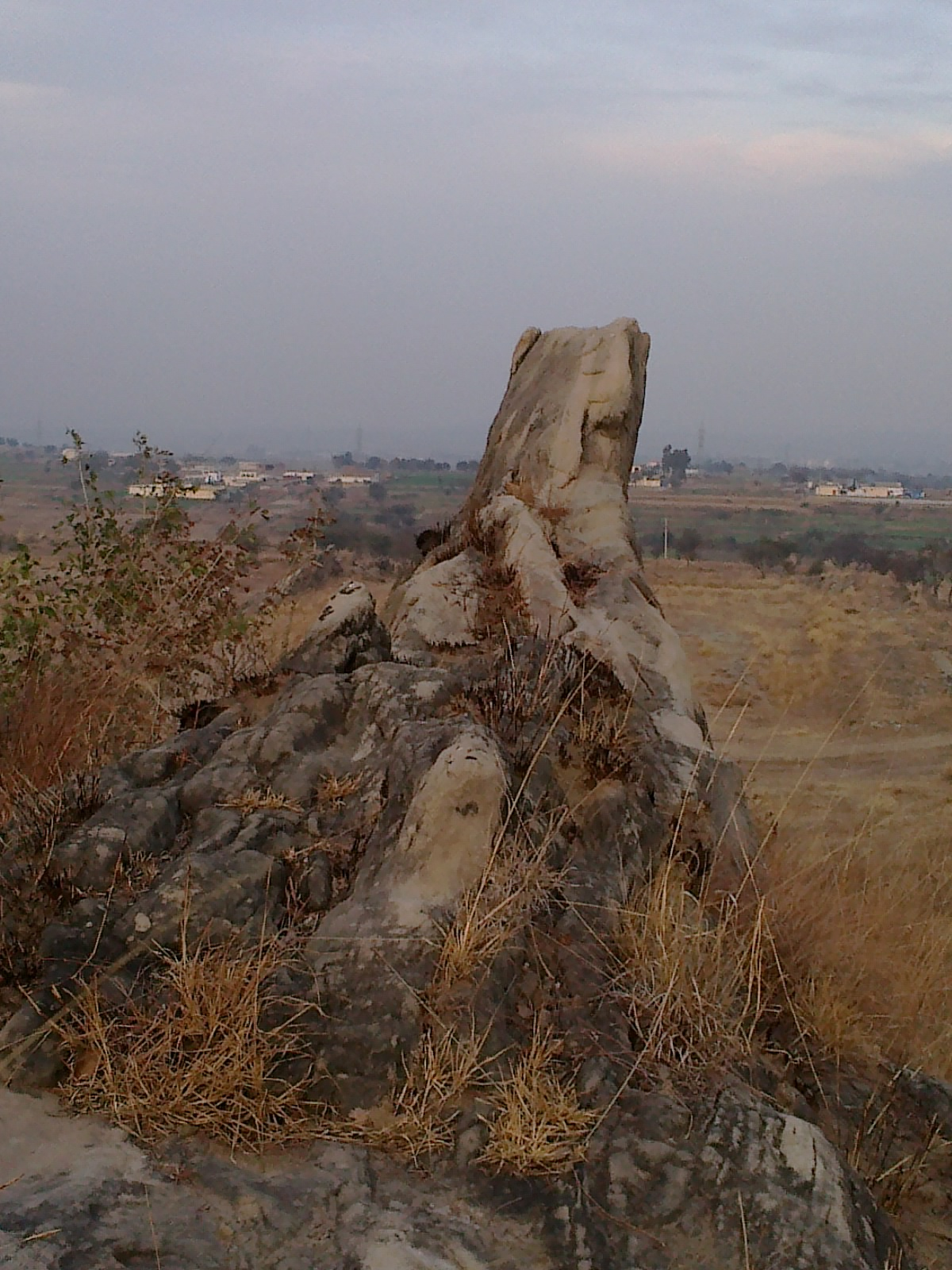

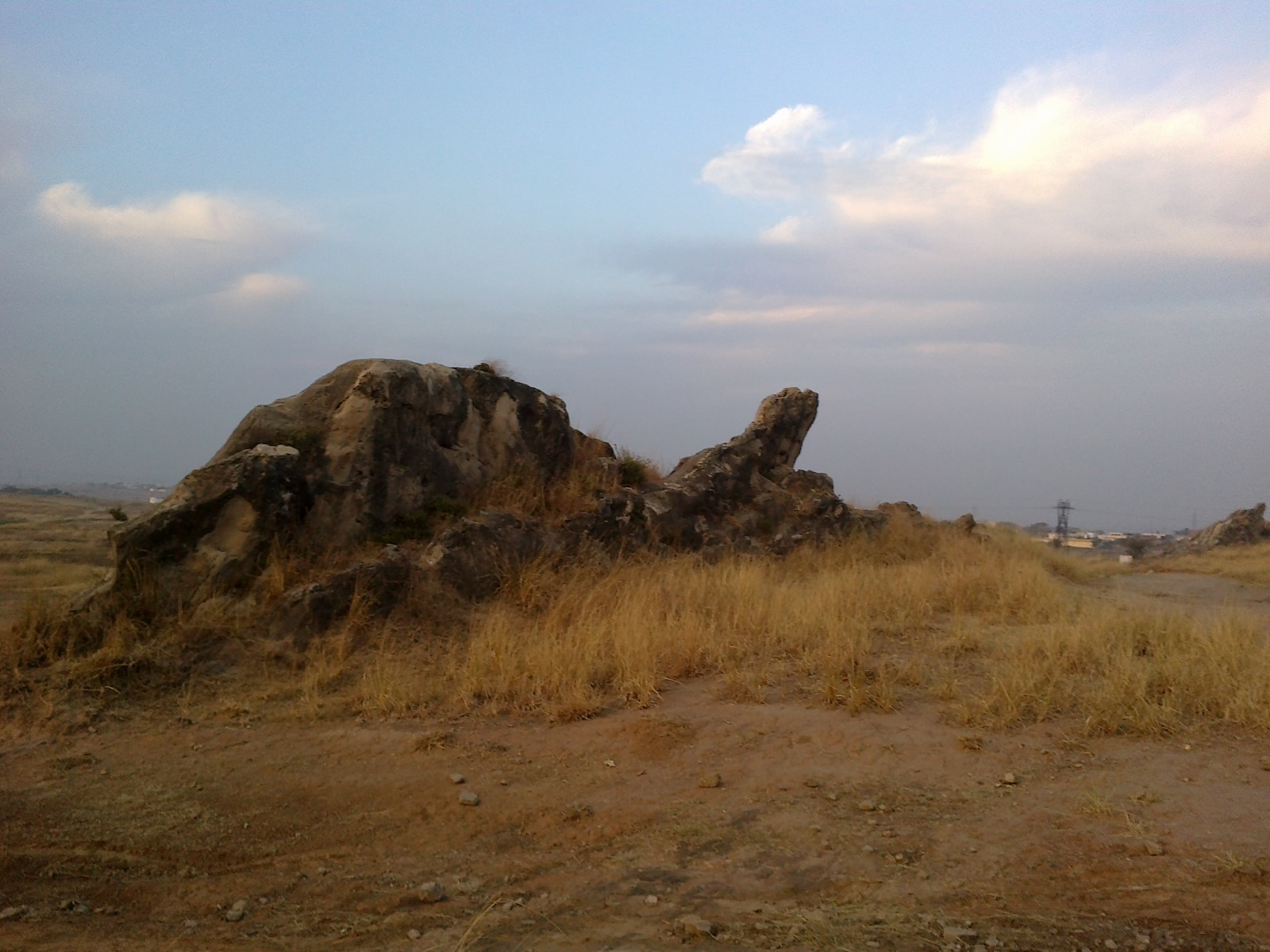

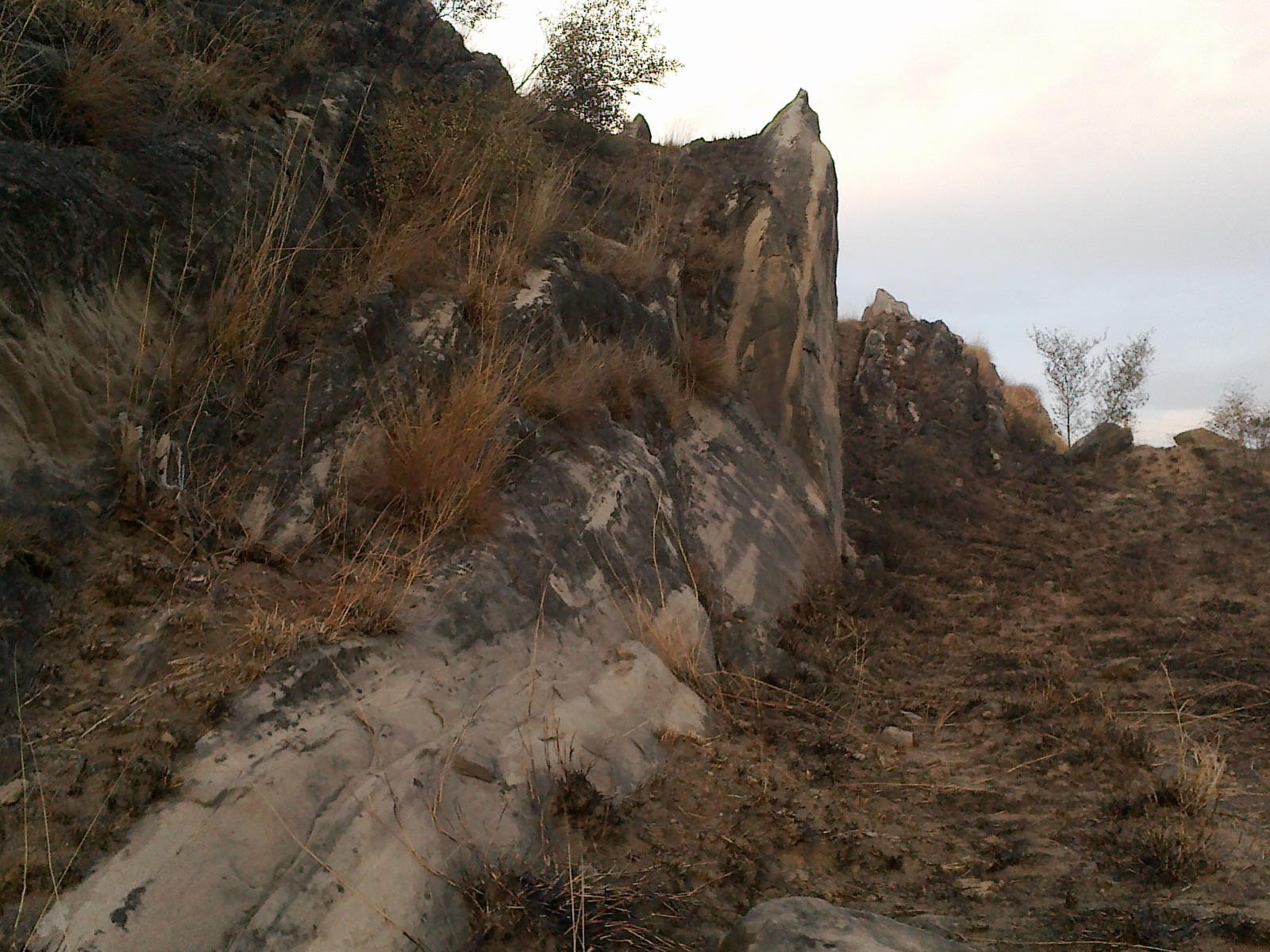
