= 2008 Ziarat earthquakes =

Earthquake in Balochistan, Pakistan

2008 Ziarat earthquake
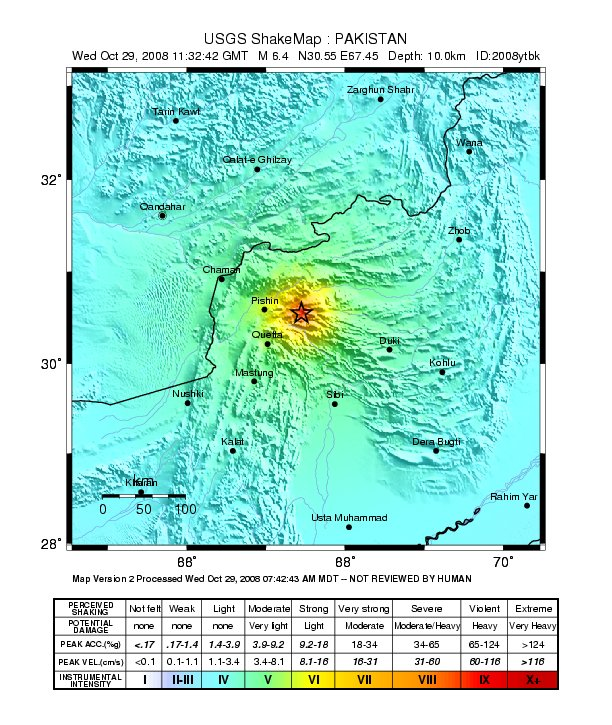
- UTC time: A: 2008-10-28 23:09:57; B: 2008-10-29 11:32:41
- ISC event: A: 13398457; B: 11378619
- USGS-ANSS: A: ComCat; B: ComCat
- Local date: October 29, 2008
- Local time: A: 04:09; B: 16:32
- Magnitude: A: 6.4 M_{w}; B: 6.4 M_{w}
- Depth: 10 km (6.2 mi)
- Epicenter: 30.569°N 67.484°E
- Areas affected: Pakistan
- Max. intensity: MMI IX (Violent)
- Casualties: 215 dead 200 injured

The 2008 Ziarat earthquakes hit the Pakistani province of Balochistan on October 29 with a moment magnitude of 6.4. The US Geological Survey reported that the first earthquake occurred 60 km (37 mi) north of Quetta and 185 km (115 mi) southeast of the Afghanistan city of Kandahar at 04:09 local time (28 October, 23:09 UTC) at a depth of 15 km (9.3 mi), at 30.653°N, 67.323°E. It was followed by another shallower magnitude 6.4 earthquake at a depth of 14 km (8.7 mi) approximately 12 hours after the initial shock, at 30.546°N, 67.447°E. 215 people were confirmed dead. More than 200 were injured (according to Mohammed Zaman, assistant to the Balochistan chief secretary, Nasir Khosa), and 120,000 were rendered homeless (according to Dilawar Khan Kakar, Ziarat, Balochistan mayor and chief administrator). Qamar Zaman Chaudhry, director general of Pakistan Meteorological Department, stated the quake epicenter was 70 miles (110 km) north of Quetta, and about 600 km (370 mi) southwest of Islamabad.

== Tectonic summary ==
Western and northern Pakistan lie across the complex plate boundary where the Indian plate is colliding with the Eurasian plate. In this area the convergence is highly oblique, with the relative northward movement of the Indian plate of 40 mm/yr (1.6 inches/yr) being at a low angle to the plate boundary. The main active faults are dominated by sinistral (left-lateral) strike-slip motion, with the Chaman Fault being the most important structure, accommodating a large proportion of the plate boundary displacement. The shortening component of the convergence is mainly accommodated by the Kirthar and Sulaiman fold and thrust belts. There is a sharp change in orientation of these two thrust belts near Quetta, known as the Quetta Syntaxis, where the north–south trending Kirthar ranges meet the west–east trending Sulaiman ranges. This area is the most seismically active part of this oblique segment of the plate margin, producing major earthquakes such as the 1935 Quetta event, which caused at least an estimated 30,000 deaths.

== Earthquake sequence ==
The earthquake sequence began at 22:33 UTC on October 28, with a magnitude 5.3 foreshock. This was followed just over 30 minutes later at 23:09 by the first of the M 6.4 doublet earthquakes. The second M 6.4 doublet earthquake occurred at 11:32 on October 29. There were five significant aftershocks in the period up to December 12, including three M>5 earthquakes on that day.

The observed focal mechanisms were almost all strike-slip in type, but it remained unclear which faults ruptured during the sequence, with both southwest–northeast trending sinistral (left lateral) and northwest–southeast trending dextral (right lateral) faults being proposed. Investigations using InSAR data supported activity on multiple faults in both of these orientations.

== Damage ==
Most of the casualties were from two villages on the outskirts of Ziarat town. Balochistan chief minister Aslam Raisani ordered declaration of emergency in the hospitals of the affected areas. These areas, situated on steep terrain, were badly damaged by landslides caused by the quake. Hundreds of mud houses were destroyed.

"Rescue work is being carried out by the villagers themselves, but a larger operation is needed here."

— Mayor of Ziarat Dilawar Kakar

The tremors were felt in Quetta, Ziarat, Pishin, Qila Abdullah, Mastung, Sibi, Bolan, Kuchlak and Loralai.

== Response ==
Dilawar Khan, mayor of Ziarat District, stated that his office had requested support from the local government. Pakistani military helicopters and troops were dispatched to assess damage and aid victims.

== See also ==
- List of earthquakes in 2008
- List of earthquakes in Pakistan
- 1935 Quetta earthquake
- 2005 Kashmir earthquake
- 2013 Balochistan earthquakes
