= Rawalpindi Gazetteer =

The Rawalpindi Gazetteer or Gazetteer of the Rawalpindi District 1893-94, is a comprehensive geographical, economic, social and cultural catalogue of Rawalpindi District. It was compiled and published in 1895 during the British period.

With 340 pages it gives an interesting picture of that period. Attock District is also included in it as it was part of Rawalpindi District. This gazetteer is part of a series district gazetteers published in British India.
