= Health risks from dead bodies =

The health risks of dead bodies are dangers related to the improper preparation and disposal of cadavers. While normal circumstances allow cadavers to be quickly embalmed, cremated, or buried; natural and man-made disasters can quickly overwhelm and/or interrupt the established protocols for dealing with the dead. Under such circumstances, the decomposition and putrefaction of cadavers goes unchecked, and raises a series of health, logistical, and psychological issues. After disasters with extensive loss of life due to trauma rather than disease—earthquakes, storms, human conflict, etc.—many resources are often expended on burying the dead quickly, and applying disinfectant to bodies for the specific purpose of preventing disease. Specialists say that spraying is a waste of disinfectant and manpower, that "resources that should be going into establishment of water supply, sanitation, shelter, warmth and hygienic food for the survivors are being applied to digging mass graves", and that "Time and time again, eminent and authoritative experts have pointed out that dead bodies do not constitute a health hazard".

== False risks ==
According to health professionals, the fear of spread of disease by bodies killed by trauma rather than disease is not justified. Among others, Steven Rottman, director of the UCLA Center for Public Health and Disasters, said that no scientific evidence exists that bodies of disaster victims increase the risk of epidemics, adding that cadavers posed less risk of contagion than living people. In disasters involving trauma where there is competition for resources, efforts should be focused on establishment of water supply, sanitation, shelter, warmth and hygienic food for the survivors, not digging mass graves. Spraying is a waste of disinfectant and manpower. Indiscriminate burial of corpses demoralises survivors and the lack of death certificates can cause practical problems to survivors. Other considerations which are very important, but not directly relevant to the topic of health risks, include religious and cultural practices, the stench, and the effect on morale.

=== Roots of incorrect notion ===
The incorrect notion that all dead bodies inherently cause diseases is consistent with:

1. The incorrect historical miasma theory of disease, which held that diseases are spread by foul air—in this case fouled by the stench of decomposing corpses.
2. Confusion between normal decay processes and signs of disease; and the incorrect idea that microorganisms responsible for decomposition are dangerous to living people. "Microorganisms involved in the decay process (putrefaction) are not pathogenic".
3. After a major disaster disease among survivors is indeed a problem, but is actually due to living in harsh conditions with poor sanitation. "Survivors present a much more important reservoir for disease [than cadavers]".
4. Noting that corpses of those who died from certain contagious diseases (for example, in epidemics) do, indeed, spread disease, such as is the case with ebola, smallpox, and the 1918 flu, and incorrectly generalising this to all corpses.

According to the Pan American Health Organization (PAHO) "concern that dead bodies are infectious can be considered a 'natural' reaction by persons wanting to protect themselves from disease" although "the risk that bodies [of those killed in a natural disaster] pose for the public is extremely small".

== Real risks ==
Contamination of water supplies by unburied bodies, burial sites, or temporary storage sites may result in the spread of gastroenteritis from normal intestinal contents.

According to a PAHO article on the Infectious Disease Risks From Dead Bodies Following Natural Disasters:

There is little evidence of microbiological contamination of groundwater from burial. Where dead bodies have contaminated water supplies, gastroenteritis has been the most notable problem, although communities will rarely use a water supply where they know it to be contaminated by dead bodies. Microorganisms involved in the decay process (putrefaction) are not pathogenic.

To those in close contact with the dead, such as rescue workers, there is a health risk from chronic infectious diseases which those killed may have been suffering from and which spread by direct contact, including hepatitis B and hepatitis C, HIV, enteric intestinal pathogens, tuberculosis, cholera, ebola and others.

The substances cadaverine and putrescine are produced during the decomposition of animal (including human) bodies, and both give off a foul odor. They are toxic if massive doses are ingested (acute oral toxicity of 2 g per kg of body weight of pure putrescine in rats, a larger dose for cadaverine); there are no effects at all for a tenth of that dose. While figures for humans are not available, allometric scaling, which takes into account body surface area, is often used to compare doses in different animals, with useful results. Scaling 2g/kg from rats suggests that a 60 kg (132 lb) person would be significantly affected by 27 grams (0.95 oz) of pure putrescine. For comparison the similar substance spermine, found in semen, is over 3 times as toxic.

== See also ==
- Neurine
