= 1555 Kashmir earthquake =

Earthquake in Pakistan

- Local date: September 1555
- Local time: Midnight
- Magnitude: 7.6–8.0 M_{w}
- Depth: Shallow
- Epicenter: 33.5°N 75.5°E
- Type: Thrust
- Areas affected: India, Pakistan
- Max. intensity: MMI XII (Extreme)
- Landslides: Yes
- Foreshocks: Several months prior
- Aftershocks: Lasted several months
- Casualties: 600–60,000 dead

The 1555 Kashmir earthquake occurred at around midnight in the month of Ashvin in the Hindu calendar, or September in the Gregorian calendar, although the exact day of occurrence is not known. The earthquake seriously impacted the Kashmir Valley in present-day Pakistan and northwestern India. A moment magnitude (M_{w}) of 7.6 to 8.0 and Modified Mercalli intensity of XII (Extreme) has been estimated for the earthquake. Thought to be one of the most destructive in the Kashmir Valley, the earthquake caused serious widespread damage and ground effects, killing an estimated 600–60,000 individuals.

== Tectonic setting ==
Northern Pakistan and India are situated at the corner of an active destructive plate boundary that separates the Indian plate from the Eurasian plate. The boundary is defined along the Main Himalayan Thrust where the Indian plate is colliding with the Eurasian plate. The slightly oblique convergence occurs at a rate of 17 ± 2 mm/yr along the Main Himalayan Thrust while the nearby Karakoram fault system accommodates right-lateral strike-slip movement at 5 ± 2 mm/yr.

The high convergence rate means many of the plate boundary faults are accommodating strain while locked, frequently releasing them in moderate-sized earthquakes, and sometimes in very large events. The occurrence of large earthquakes makes the Kashmir region vulnerable to deadly earthquakes.

== Earthquake ==
The earthquake had a magnitude estimated at M_{w} 7.6–8.2, and ruptured a section of the Himalayan plate boundary fault which has been identified as a seismic gap. This gap spans 200 km (120 mi) and is between the rupture zones of the 2005 Kashmir and 1905 Kangra earthquakes.

It may have been caused by rupture on an active thrust fault that forms part of the plate boundary of the Kashmir Himalayas. The source fault and possible surface ruptures associated with the earthquake have not been identified due to the lack of information of the event and limited exploration of paleoseismic evidence. The Main Frontal Thrust, Medlicott-Wadia (Reasi) Thrust, and the Kashmir Basin Fault (also called the Balapur Fault) has been proposed as the source fault.

The Medlicott-Wadia Thrust is expressed on the surface as two branching fault structures; the Scorpion and Rain faults. Paleoseismic trenching at Reasi have identified three large earthquakes on the Rain Fault, and two on the Scorpion Fault in the past 3,500 years. An account in Persian describing a destructive earthquake in 1250 BC corresponded to the oldest event which was dated at 1661 BC and 929 BC. The 1250 BC earthquake produced several meters of slip at the surface. Another earthquake occurred between 1118 BC and 929 BC with less than 1 meter of maximum slip. The Rain Fault may have ruptured in one or two earthquakes sometime between 1110 BC and 660, and is possible that the two faults were involved in an earthquake in approximately 1000 BC. Persian and Sanskrit records also corresponded well with two earthquakes on the Rain Fault dated between 660 and 1470.The most recent earthquake rupture is dated at 1470 or later. Large colluvial wedges associated with the rupture suggest the event caused high intensity shaking at the surface. The date of the rupture might suggest it was associated with the 1555 earthquake. The Medlicott-Wadia Thrust represents out-of-sequence thrusting; the activation of older thrust faults behind the active thrust front (as opposed to in-sequence thrusting the thrust front follows a hinterland-to-foreland propagation style).

At the Chandigarh Fault near the Main Frontal Thrust, a surface rupture was discovered and it likely formed between 1426 and 1700. This surface rupture could correspond to the 1555 earthquake. The rupture length was estimated to be 150 km (93 mi).

== Future hazard ==
In the wake of the 2005 Kashmir earthquake, much attention has been given to the Kashmir region in understanding the earthquake tectonics and assessing the seismic risk. The 1555 earthquake rupture is located roughly between that of the 2005 and 1905 Kangra earthquakes. No major seismic events have occurred since the 1555 earthquake in the 250-km-long Kashmir seismic gap on the Main Himalayan plate boundary fault. With a slip rate of 16 mm/yr, the accumulated slip since 1555 is estimated at 7.4 meters. If the 1555 earthquake released all the elastic energy accumulated since the previous earthquake, and fresh accumulation of stress began after the 1555 event, the next large earthquake could be as large as 7.8 M_{w}.

== Historical description ==
The devastation of the 1555 earthquake was well documented in Persian and Sanskrit. The historical accounts described a series of earthquakes, the strongest occurring at midnight in the month Asvina of the year 30 in the Hindu calendar. It describes the Kashmir Valley rocked by strong tremors at night while many of the residents were asleep. Many dwellings collapsed onto their residents, killing them. Homes that were well-constructed with firm foundations were not spared from the destruction; collapsing as well. Large ground fissures and sinkholes appeared in the landscape, swallowing many homes. Survivors broke through their roofs to escape from their damaged homes. Some wood-constructed structures fell into the Jhelum River and floated downstream. Those who survived the collapses managed to escape from the debris.

Many towns and villages were completely destroyed in Kashmir. In the communities of Jalu and Damper, the force of the earthquake sheared off the foundations of homes and roots of trees, and displaced them onto the opposite bank of the Jhelum River. The town of Madar, located at the base of a hill, was buried by a landslide, causing the deaths of 600 to 60,000 people. The two villages Hassanpur and Hussainpur, located on the opposite side of the Veshaw River, was suddenly shifted to the other side during the earthquake. The earthquake formed large cracks in the ground, stopped water from flowing from existing natural springs, while in other locations, water erupted from the ground. Damage was reported up to 50 km southwest and 140 km southeast of Srinagar.

The Laxmi Narayana Temple in Chamba, Himachal Pradesh, India, also suffered some damage to its pillars.

Months prior to the mainshock, there was a series of foreshocks. An aftershock sequence that lasted several days was also documented in the scripts. On some days, multiple aftershocks could be felt. This categorizes the 1555 Kashmir earthquake sequence as a classic foreshock-mainshock-aftershock earthquake sequence.

The famous historical documentation of towns shifted across riverbanks during the 1555 event was likely a gradual process rather than sudden. Tilted tree stumps at the bank of the Jhelum River at the locations described suggest slumping due to ground failure along the riverbank.

Restoration and repair works continued for two months after the earthquake.

== See also ==
- List of earthquakes in India
- List of earthquakes in Pakistan
- List of historical earthquakes
