= Patriata =

Pakistani locality

Coordinates: 33.8743°N 73.4570°E

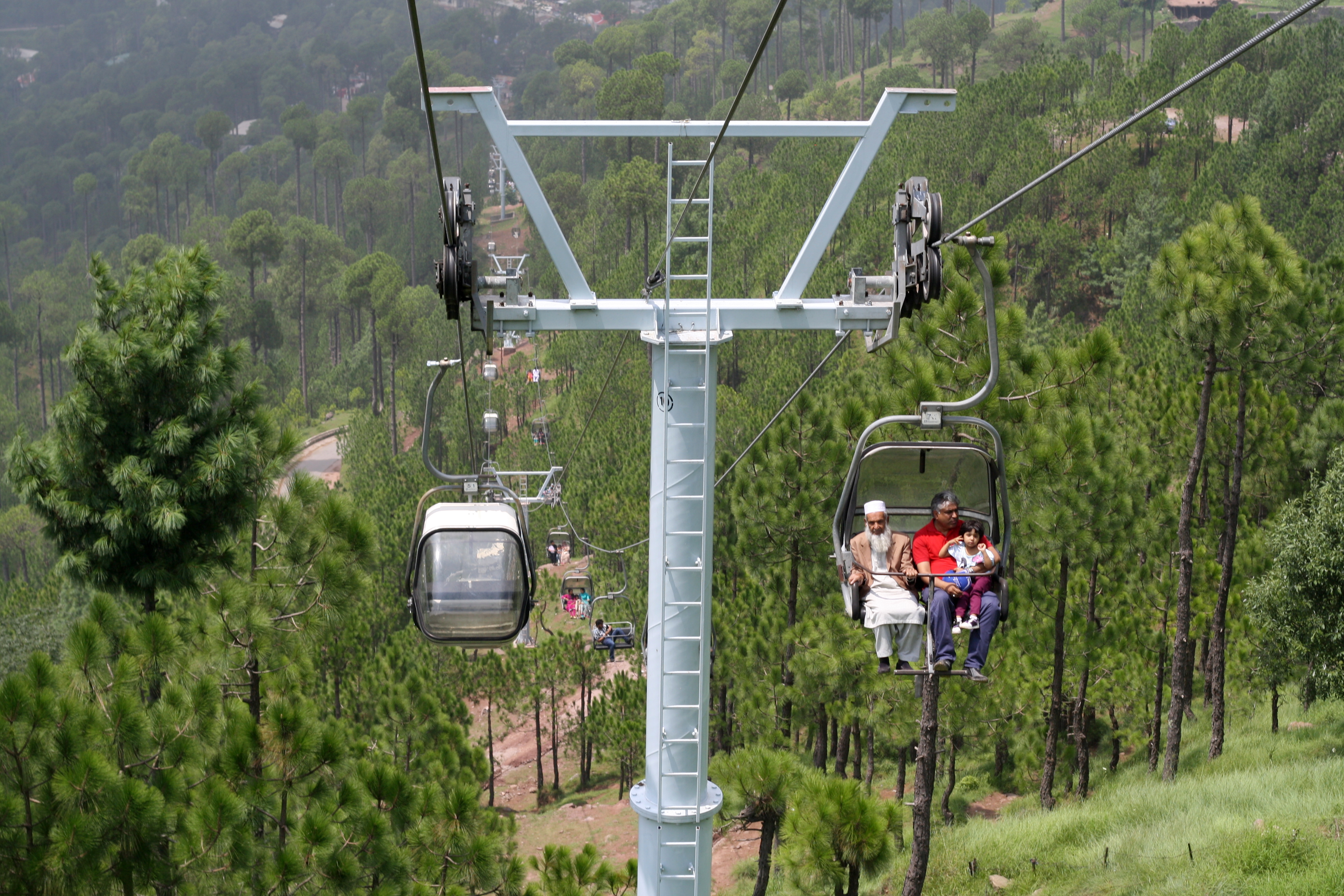
View from chairlift, Patriata

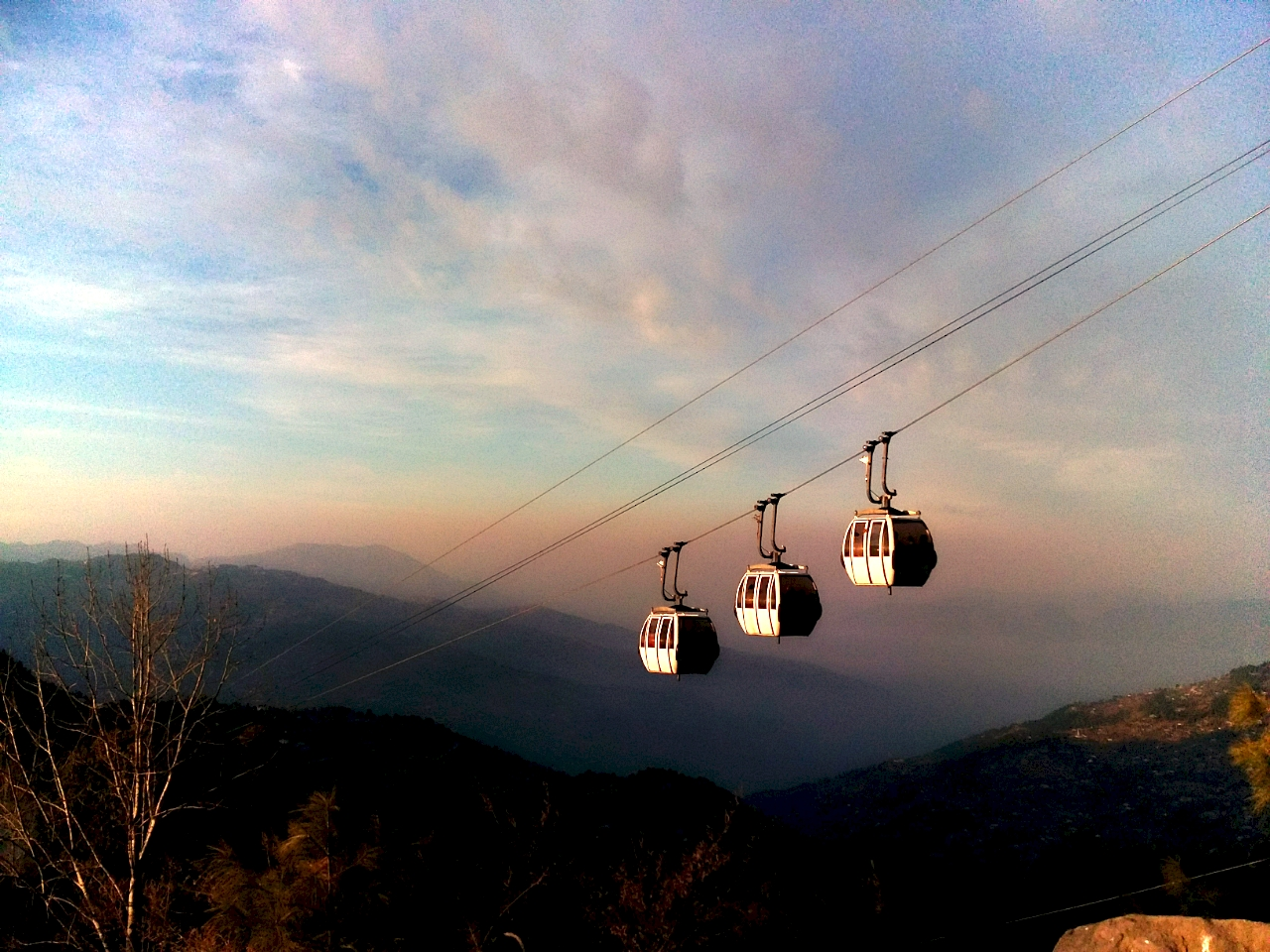
Patriatta Gondola cable car

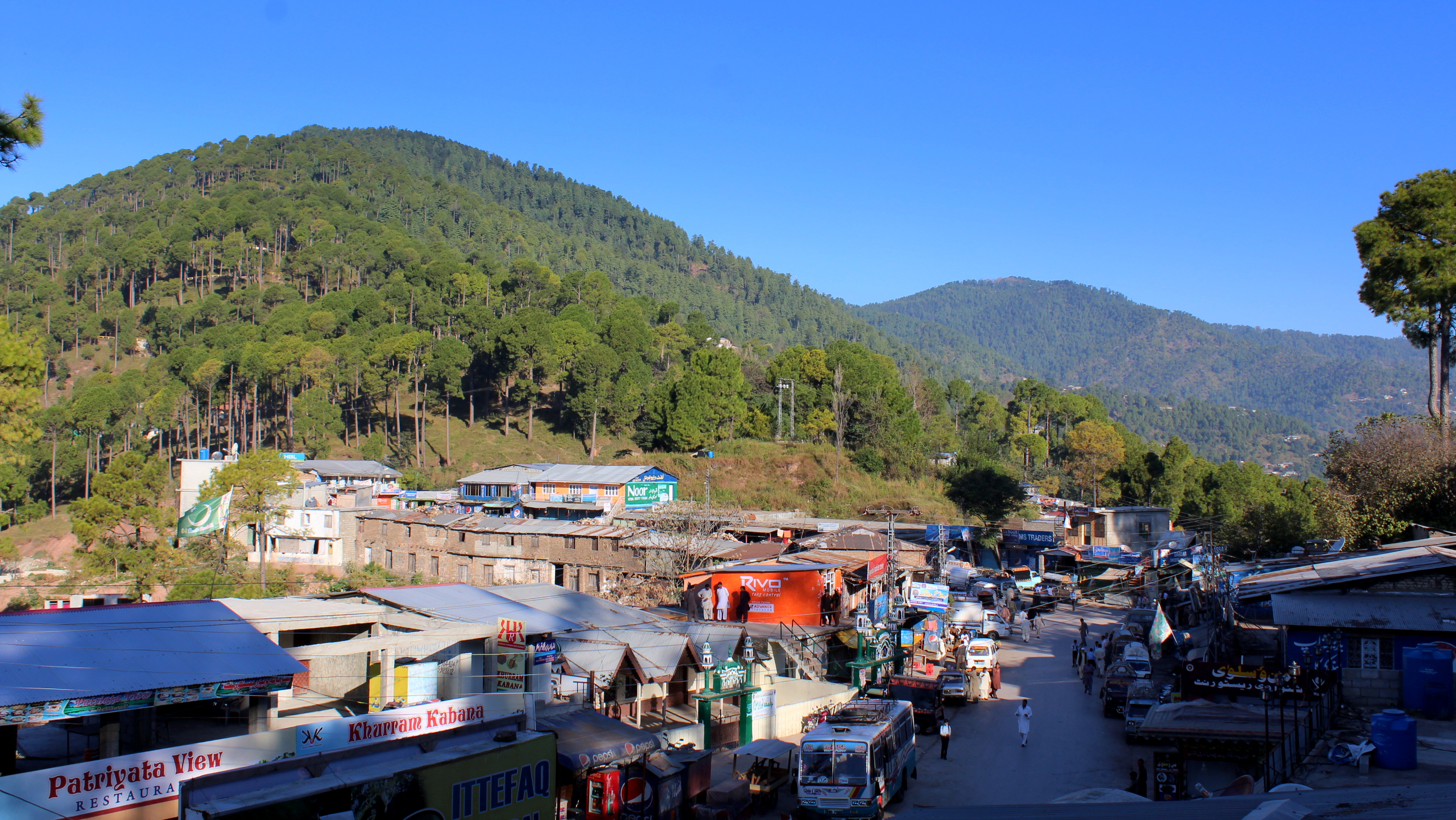
New Murree Patriata

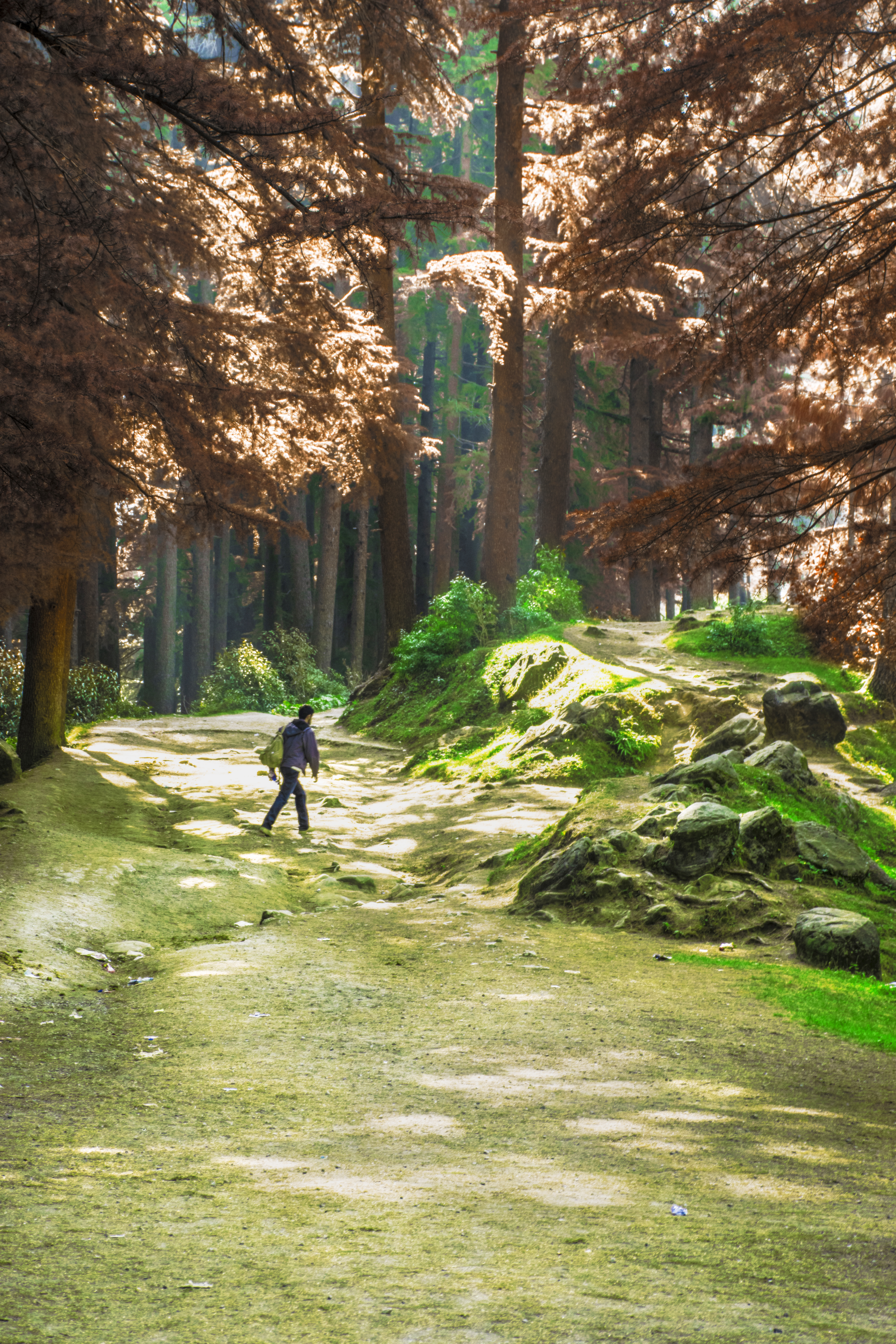
A view of autumn in Patriata, Murree, Pakistan

Patriata also known as New Murree is a hill station in northern Punjab, Pakistan. It is situated 15 kilometres (9.3 mi) south-east of Murree hill. Patriata is located in Murree Tehsil which is a subdivision of Murree District. It is the highest point in the area and the hills stand 2,300 metres (7,500 ft) above sea level.

== Tourism ==
The cooler climate in Patriata makes this hill station a favorable tourist location compared to further south. The large tourist presence in Murree also makes Patriata a more attractive hub for many. A Gondola chair lift and cable car system allow visitors to access the highest points. The area is heavily forested and there are many monkeys and leopards in the area.
