= Ali Jaan =

Ali Jaan Brahui: علی جان Urdu: علی جان
- Location within Pakistan
- Coordinates: 28.52°N 66.23°E
- Country: Pakistan
- Time zone: UTC+5 (PST)

Ali Jaan is a town in the Balochistan province of Pakistan, located at 28°52′0″N 66°23′0″E. It was near the epicentre of the 1935 Quetta earthquake that struck on 31 May 1935.
