= Chaman Fault =

Geological fault in Pakistan and Afghanistan

The Chaman Fault is a major, active geological fault in Pakistan and Afghanistan that runs for over 850 km. Tectonically, it is actually a system of related geologic faults that separates the Eurasian plate from the Indo-Australian plate. It is a terrestrial, primarily transform, left-lateral strike-slip fault. The slippage rate along the Chaman fault system as the Indo-Australian plate moves northward (relative to the Eurasian plate) has been estimated at 10 mm/yr or more. In addition to its primary transform aspect, the Chaman fault system has a compressional component as the Indian plate is colliding with the Eurasian plate. This type of plate boundary is sometimes called a transpressional boundary.

From the south, the Chaman fault starts at the triple junction where the Arabian plate, the Eurasian plate and the Indo-Australian plate meet, which is just off the Makran Coast of Pakistan. The fault tracks northeast across Balochistan and then north-northeast into Afghanistan, runs just to the west of Kabul, and then northeastward across the right-lateral-slip Herat fault, up to where it merges with the Pamir fault system north of the 38° parallel. The Ghazaband and Ornach-Nal faults are often included as part of the Chaman fault system. South of the triple junction, where the fault zone lies undersea and extends southwest to approximately 10°N 57°E, it is known as the Owen fracture zone.

While there is general agreement that the fault is slipping at a rate of at least 10 mm/yr, there is a report of volcanic rocks in Pakistan dated to 2 m.y. BP which have been offset such as to indicate a slip rate of 25–35 mm/yr. Offsets have been described throughout the fault in Pakistan that are young enough that "only the alluvium of the bottom of active dry washes is not displaced".

The parallel mountain ranges of eastern Balochistan, (east to west) the Kirthar Mountains, the Khude Mountains, the Zarro Mountains, the Pab Mountains and the Mor Mountains, are a result of the compressional plate boundary and are aligned parallel to the Chaman fault movement. The fault itself is west of these ranges.

== Significant earthquakes along the fault ==
- 1505, 5 July or 6th – An earthquake created a 60 km long surface rupture along a transverse fault in the Chaman system with several meters of vertical offset. This transverse fault is sometimes called the Paghman fault.
- 1892, 20 December –
- 1935, 31 May – The 7.7 $M_\mathrm{w}$ 1935 Quetta earthquake along the Ghazaband portion of the fault system killed upwards of 35,000 people.
- 1978, 16 March – A 6.4 $M_\mathrm{w}$ earthquake created a 5 km long rupture with up to 4 cm of left-lateral offset, and a smaller amount of vertical slip as the eastern wall of the fault dropped down.

== See also ==
- List of faults in Pakistan
- 2008 Ziarat earthquakes
- 2013 Balochistan earthquakes
