= 2013 Balochistan earthquakes =

Violent earthquake in Pakistan

- Location within Pakistan
- UTC time: 2013-09-24 11:29:47
- ISC event: 608458290
- USGS-ANSS: ComCat
- Local date: 24 September 2013
- Local time: 16:29:48 PKT (UTC+5)
- Magnitude: M_{w} 7.8
- Depth: 12.8 kilometres (8.0 mi)
- Epicenter: 26.951°N 65.501°E
- Type: Oblique-slip
- Areas affected: Balochistan, Pakistan
- Total damage: US$100 million (equivalent to $138.2 million in 2025)
- Max. intensity: MMI IX (Violent)
- Tsunami: 1.09 m (3.6 ft)
- Aftershocks: 50 ≥M_{w}4.0 (as of 25 September 2014); Largest is M_{w}6.8
- Casualties: 840 fatalities, 619 injuries

The 2013 Balochistan earthquakes were the deadliest to affect Pakistan since 2005. The mainshock, occurring on 24 September, had a moment magnitude of 7.8 and maximum Mercalli intensity of IX (Violent). It had an epicenter located in Awaran District, 113 km (70 mi) northwest of Bela. The mainshock killed over 820 people, injured hundreds of others, and left 100,000 people homeless. The Awaran District was among the worst affected with 80 percent of its housing stock damaged or destroyed. On 28 September, the region was affected by a M_{w} 6.8 aftershock, killing an additional 15 people. Rescue and recovery efforts were severely hampered by insurgents who attacked military troops sent to distribute aid. These attacks also prompted the Pakistan government to close its doors to international aid.

== Tectonic setting ==
On a broad scale, the tectonics of southern and central Pakistan reflect a complex plate boundary where the Indian plate slides northward relative to the Eurasia plate in the east, and the Arabia Plate subducts northward beneath the Eurasia plate in the Makran (western Pakistan). These motions typically result in north–south to northeast–southwest strike-slip motion at the latitude of the 24 September earthquake that is primarily accommodated on the Chaman Fault, with the earthquake potentially occurring on one of the southernmost strands of this fault system. Further, more in-depth studies will be required to identify the precise fault associated with this event. Although seismically active, this portion of the Eurasia plate boundary region has not experienced large damaging earthquakes in recent history. In the past 40 years, only one significant event has occurred within 200 kilometres (120 mi) of this event, which was a M_{w} 6.1 earthquake in July 1990 that killed six people.

== Earthquake ==
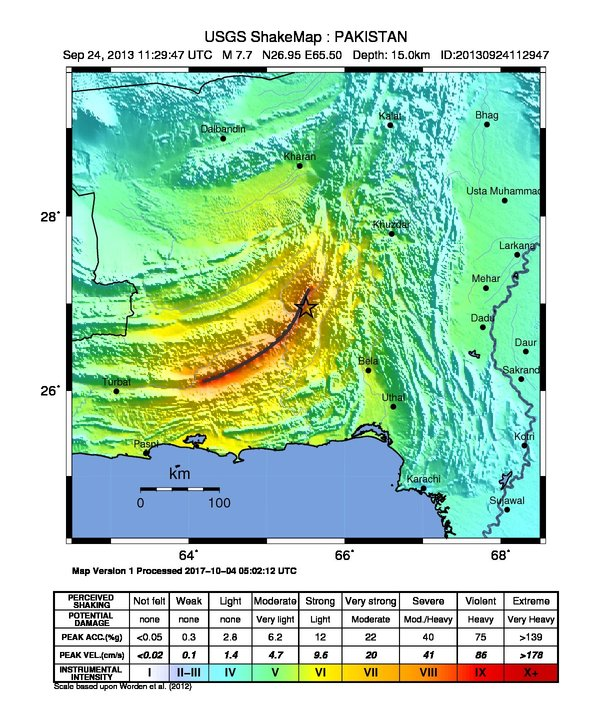
USGS ShakeMap showing for the event

The earthquake was recorded by the International Seismological Centre with a moment magnitude of 7.8, and estimated the hypocenter's depth at 12.8 km (8.0 mi). The earthquake occurred as a result of the oblique-strike-slip type motion at shallow crustal depths. The location and mechanism of the earthquake are consistent with rupture within the Eurasia plate above the Makran Trench subduction zone. The event occurred within the transition zone between northward subduction of the Arabian plate beneath the Eurasian plate and northward collision of the Indian plate with the Eurasia plate.

=== Rupture ===
The mainshock produced a 200 km (120 mi) surface rupture. The seismic rupture initiated along a near-vertical fault and propagated mainly southwest along a curved fault that dipped 50° to the north. The fault segment is part of the Chaman Fault; during which its southern segment ruptured. Although the predominant rupture direction was southwest, with some rupture to the north, most of the aftershocks occurred north of the epicenter. Supershear rupture propagation velocity also occurred along some segments during the mainshock.

The source fault, identified as the Hoshab Fault, was likely an old thrust fault due to its shallow dip angle. It formed within an accretionary wedge related to the Makran Trench. During the earthquake, displacements along the fault was exclusively strike-slip. A possible explanation for the faulting behavior is due to the accretionary wedge being pushed eastwards towards the Indian plate. Much of the inferred displacements occurred no less than 10 km (6.2 mi) beneath the surface. Peak slip was estimated at 10 m (33 ft) while the average slip across the rupture was 6 m (20 ft). Satellite mapping of the surface rupture revealed a maximum displacement of 17 m (56 ft) and averaged out at 8.5 m (28 ft). The peak slip ranked among the second largest ever observed from a continental strike-slip earthquake, behind the 1855 Wairarapa earthquake. The largest aftershock, measuring M_{w} 6.8, occurred on 28 September at a depth of 12.0 km (7.5 mi).

=== Tsunami ===
A tsunami, likely triggered by an undersea landslide located 60–70 km (37–43 mi) off the coast of Jiwani, was recorded by tide gauges in countries surrounding the Arabian Sea. A tide gauge in Qurayyat, Oman, recorded a 1.09 m (3 ft 7 in) tsunami wave, the highest tsunami observation, and in Muscat, the tsunami measured 0.51 m (1 ft 8 in). The city of Sur recorded a 0.40 m (1 ft 4 in) wave. The tsunami also measured 0.13 m (5.1 in) in Ormara, Pakistan; 0.27 m (11 in) in Ashkhara, Oman; 0.23 m (9.1 in) in Chabahar, Iran; and 0.19 m (7.5 in) in Khawr Wudam, Oman.

=== Island ===
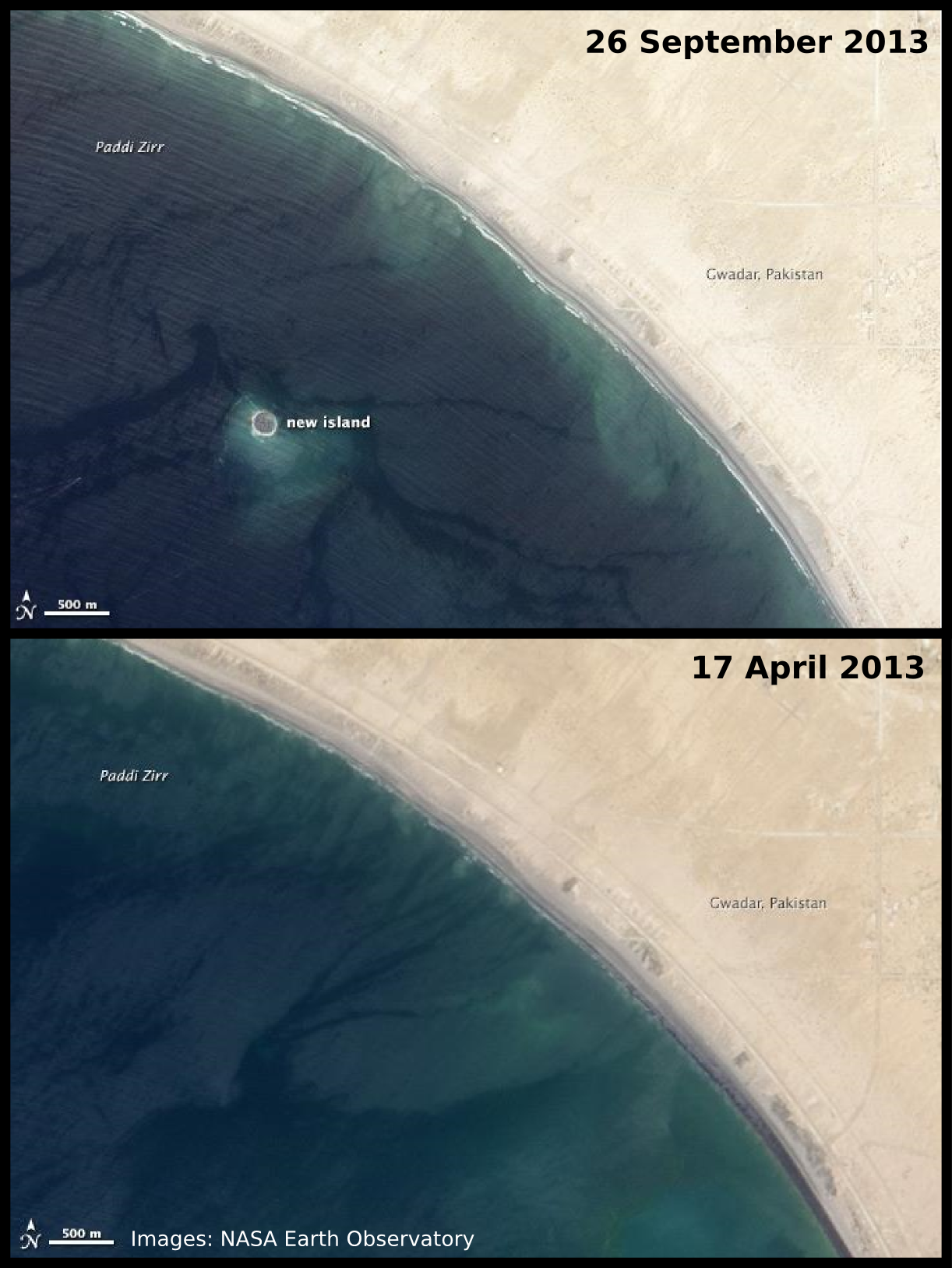
Satellite images of Zalzala Jazeera off the coast of Gwadar

An island measuring 200 m (660 ft) long, 100 m (330 ft) across and 20 m (66 ft) high, appeared in the Arabian Sea off the coast of Gwadar ahortly after the mainshock. The island mostly comprised mud and sand, and some parts were rocky. Local residents visited the oval-shaped island a day after it appeared. A visitors on the island reported flammable gas emitted from ground cracks on the island.

Columbia University seismologist John Armbruster attributed the occurrence with liquefaction of compacted and pressurised sediments beneath the seabed. The seismic disturbance caused these sediments to eject towards the surface. Meanwhile, Gary Gibson of the University of Melbourne said the island likely formed from a mud volcano after methane gas pushed the overlying material upwards. The Pakistan National Institute of Oceanography observed methane emitting from the island. A similar occurrence was recorded by the British Geological Survey in the 1940s when a temporary island appeared before being washed away. By late 2016, the island had completely disappeared.

== Impact ==
At least 825 people died and 619 others were injured due to the mainshock. It was considered the worst earthquake to affect Pakistan since the 2005 Kashmir earthquake. Many survivors suffered broken bones or lost a limb when the buildings they were inside collapsed. The earthquake affected a sparsely populated region of southern Pakistan where most of the population live in poverty. Homes in the region were also commonly made with mud bricks which were prone to collapse during earthquakes. The shock affected about 300,000 people across the districts of Awaran, Kech, Gwadar, Panjgur, Chaghi and Khuzdar. Over 100,000 people were made homeless; many survivors slept outdoors or in temporary shelters.

Most homes and buildings in the region were constructed of mud bricks and collapsed during the earthquake and subsequent aftershocks. An official in the Balochistan province claimed that 80 percent of the homes in the Awaran District had collapsed or were damaged. There were 386 deaths in the district, 32,638 homes destroyed, and another 14,118 damaged. There were also 254 deaths in Kech, 60 in Khuzdar, 17 in Kalat, 9 in Chagai and 6 in Gwadar. Damage from the earthquake was estimated at US$100 million.

An aftershock on September 28 killed an additional 15 people. In Nokjo, Arawan District, the aftershock damaged most structures and trapped their occupants. Terrified people evacuated a hospital in the district and in Quetta, workers fled a local parliament building.

== Aftermath ==
The national army said over 200 medical personnel and 1,000 soldiers were dispatched to Balochistan. The vastly mountainous area and absence of communication challenged early stage of the recovery efforts. Within a day, some severely injured people were flown to Karachi for medical attention while others received assistance in nearby districts. Sixty military vehicles from Karachi also delivered aid. The government also distributed 10,000 food kits to sustain a family for 15 days.

Rescue efforts were further challenged when attacks from an alleged rebel group linked with anti-government campaigns targeted military convoys transporting supplies. On 26 September, two rockets were fired at a helicopter carrying the National Disaster Management Authority chairman, other officials and media crew. Government sources blamed the attack on Balochi separatists.

Separatists were blamed for their role in disrupting the recovery process with their activities. In addition to attacks targeting soldiers, a medical team was also targeted. Two soldiers were killed in an explosion while transporting aid. Balochistan officials denied external assistance to the region citing the security concerns. However, the provincial chief minister, Abdul Malik Baloch, appealed to the federal government to allow foreign aid into the province. A minister spokesperson blamed separatists for hampering aid efforts and said they should reduce their forces during times of crisis. Several international organisations including Doctors Without Borders said the central government did not give them permission to assist despite the group's readiness.

In December 2018, the Pakistan army completed the construction of 75 new homes in a new village called Jebri, located in Arawan's Mashkay Tehsil. The project which began in May took approximately six months to complete. These homes were equipped with a solar panel and access to power and running water.

== See also ==
- List of earthquakes in 2013
- List of earthquakes in Pakistan
