= Chennai Protest of Innocence of Muslims =

On September 14, 2012, the U.S. consulate in Chennai, India, was attacked in response to a YouTube trailer for Innocence of Muslims as Muslim protesters threw stones and footwear at the building. This event was part of a series of attacks that carried on from September 11, 2012, through September 29, 2014, throughout worldwide Muslim communities. Windowpanes and walls were damaged and 25 people suffered minor injuries.

== Background ==
=== Depiction of Muhammad ===
Depictions of Muhammad have long been an issue of concern in Islam which many Muslims consider to be blasphemous. While written and oral descriptions of Muhammed are universally accepted by Islam, the Hadith (supplemental teaching of the Quran) prohibits Muslims from creating any visual representation of Muhammed. The biggest concern in this tradition is that an image could promote idolatry. This tradition has been long-lasting and the few depictions that do exist throughout Islamic history, Muhammad is veiled or he is represented by symbols such as a flame.

== Innocence of Muslims ==
The anti-Islamic film that was written and produced by Nakoula Bassely Nakoula, was uploaded in two versions to YouTube in July 2012 under the titles The Real Life of Muhammad and The Muhammad Movie Trailer. The videos were dubbed in the Arabic language and anti-Islamic content was added in post-production without the consent of the actors who starred in the film.

The original script was written about life in Egypt 2,000 years ago but with the overdubbing and heavy use of the phrase “Muhammad,” The New York Times stated: “the trailer opens with scenes of Egyptian security forces standing idle as Muslims pillage and burn the homes of Egyptian Christians. Then it cuts to cartoonish scenes depicting Muhammad as a child of uncertain parentage, a buffoon, a womanizer, a homosexual, a child molester, and a greedy, bloodthirsty thug.”

YouTube eventually blocked the video in Egypt and Libya, Indonesia, Saudi Arabia, Malaysia, Singapore and India. Turkey, Brazil, and Russia soon followed suit. In September 2012, Afghanistan, Bangladesh, Sudan, and the Pakistani governments blocked YouTube completely in response to it not taking down the video.

== State reaction ==
Security was heightened at the American consulates in Chennai, Mumbai, Kolkata, and Hyderabad. Furthermore, the Indian government was quick to discuss the banning of the video and the Ministry of Home Affairs forwarded a formal request of the Jammu and Kashmir government to block all webpages where the film is accessible to the director-general of Computer Emergency Response Team India for immediate attention.

== See also ==
- Reactions to Innocence of Muslims
