= SAISA =

School association

The South Asian Inter-Scholastic Association (better known as SAISA), brings top 10 international schools from across the Indian subcontinent region together to compete against one another in sports, music, and other extracurricular activities. It is comparable to other regional networks of international schools, such as the Interscholastic Association of Southeast Asian Schools (IASAS), operating in Southeast Asia.

SAISA events enable students to represent their schools, visit other international schools in the region, sample and experience homestays with other families. The event participants must comply to a strict code of conduct.

== Purpose ==
The purpose of SAISA is to promote and coordinate regional professional development activities, academic and cultural festivals, athletic tournaments, and other events deemed appropriate by the member schools.

As educators committed to the ideal of realizing the full potential of each student, we believe the fundamental aim of SAISA is to promote the values of collaboration, creativity, sportsmanship, fair and ethical competition.

While acknowledging the notion of ‘winning’ in sporting events and other competitions, a recognition more critical is that students come together to participate in various activities in the truest spirit of cooperation and competition, and develop physically, emotionally, creatively and intellectually through the sporting, academic and artistic experiences themselves.

To ensure its realization in each SAISA event, the above aims is to be included in the correspondence between each school, its students and parents.

International School of Islamabad (ISI - now ISOI), Lahore American School (LAS), Karachi American School (KAS), Murree Christian School (MCS) and the American International School of Kabul (AISK) came together to become the South Asia Inter-Schools Association (SAISA). This was a way for the schools to give their students a cross cultural opportunity, to play competitive sports and make new friends.

The schools annually arranged sporting, cultural and academic events. These included flag football, basketball, field hockey and soccer; track & field, swimming, tennis, badminton and table tennis. Cultural events consisted of drama, with each school performing a one-act play, music, and art. Academically, College Bowl, debate and chess also featured. Small schools like MCS typically closed down for a week in order to participate in multiple events. These events were all held on the same week, not spread out over the year as they are currently. Later, other international schools around South Asia began to join the organization. The American Embassy School (AES) Delhi joined SAISA after the Soviet invasion of Afghanistan in 1979, which also ended Kabul’s involvement in SAISA.

By the early nineties, the original schools were joined by the American International School of Dhaka (AISD), the Overseas Children’s School of Colombo (OCS) and Lincoln School, Kathmandu (LS). OCS later became the Overseas School of Colombo (OSC). In the early nineties, SAISA decided to split into two divisions, East and West, for swimming and track & field. Three major all-SAISA sports tournaments were held per year. However, during the 1996-97 academic year tournaments were "split"; for instance, the Boys Soccer and Girls Basketball tournaments, which had recently been hosted together at AES (1993–94), ISI (1994–95), and again at AES (1995–96), were split between ISI (Boys Soccer) and LAS (Girls Basketball), thereby allowing some of the smaller schools to host events. Meanwhile, the Cultural Convention focused on music, drama and art. Later art was dropped from the program. Soon after AISC or The American International School of Chennai joined, When the decision was made to do music and drama separately, the idea was to rotate these each year so that schools could attend only one event would be able to do music on year and drama the next. However, the logistics proved too complex and by the mid-90s, drama had settled into a February slot and music into April. Only the large schools like Islamabad, Delhi and Dhaka, which had large campuses and enough housing for all participants, were able to host the all-SAISA events. This limited smaller schools to hosting East/West tournaments, split tournaments, or middle school-only events. MCS, for example, hosted the SAISA West Middle School Boys Soccer tournament with participants from Lahore, Karachi and Islamabad staying at the nearby Pearl Continental hotel in Bhurban.

Over time, events like art, racquet sports, College Bowl, debate and chess were all shelved. Flag football disappeared from the schedule in the mid-80s as more and more local students, who were not familiar with American football, enrolled in member schools. The core sports became soccer (Boys), basketball (Boys and Girls), field hockey (Boys and Girls), and volleyball (Girls). Field hockey was cut after the 1994-95 academic year because insurance premiums were too high and replaced with volleyball for boys and soccer for girls. The final Girls Field Hockey tournament, played at KAS in the fall of 1994, was won by ISI, which defeated KAS in penalty strokes 1-0 after a scoreless match. The final Boys Field Hockey tournament was a split tournament hosted by LAS, in which the hosts defeated surprise finalist ISI 1-0. (In fact, this tournament was the nail in the sport's coffin, as a player from AES was struck in the face by a stick, complained of headaches, and later had to be medevac'd for life-saving surgery to repair a crushed sinus.)

SAISA tournaments during the 80s also including cheerleading, which is not included in today’s programs. As the organization spread out over a larger area, resulting in teams' traveling internationally to attend tournaments, it became prohibitively expensive to take squads of cheerleaders. Cultural sensitivities were also a factor in the decision to discontinue cheerleading, given the typically scanty uniforms worn by cheerleaders. By the early 90s, cheering was simply each school's boys teams attending the girls' matches and cheering for them, and vice versa.

== Activities ==
=== Athletic ===
- Competitive Swimming
- Volleyball
- Soccer
- Basketball
- Tennis
- Track & Field
- Badminton

=== Non-athletic ===
- Art
- Music
- Band

== Members ==
=== India ===
- American Embassy School, New Delhi (AES Tigers)
- American School of Bombay, Mumbai (ASB Eagles)

=== Bangladesh ===
- American International School of Dhaka, Dhaka (AISD Tigers)

=== Sri Lanka ===
- Overseas School of Colombo, Colombo (OSC Geckos)

=== Oman ===
- The American International School Muscat, Muscat (TAISM Eagles)

=== Jordan ===
- American Community School, Amman (ACS Scorpions)

=== Pakistan ===
- International School of Islamabad, Islamabad (ISOI Cobras)
- Lahore American School, Lahore (LAS Buffalos)
- Karachi American School. Karachi (KAS Knights)

== Track and field records ==
SAISA is widely known for its track and field program. The following table lists association records.

=== Girls 10–12 ===
Event	Time/Distance	Date	Name/School
100 m	12.87	2023	A. Ellington-McIntosh AISD
200 m	28.22	2000	E. Muzenga ISOI
400 m	1:03.03	2023	A. Ellington-McIntosh AISD
800 m	2:32.61	2023	A. Ellington-McIntosh AISD
1,500 m	5:29.80	2008	J. Holborow AES
3,000 m	11:58.10	2008	J. Holborow AES
4x100 m relay	56.3	1979	KAS
4x400 m relay	4:51.99	2019	OSC
Shot put	10.30 m	2026	M. Settle ASB
Discus	21.34 m	2026	M. Settle ASB
Long jump	4.68 m	2023	A. Ellington-McIntosh AISD
High jump	1.45 m	2023	A. Ellington-McIntosh AISD

=== Boys 10–12 ===
Event	Time/Distance	Date	Name/School
100 m	11.57	2018	D. Rehan KAS
200 m	25.58	2018	D. Rehan KAS
400 m	1:00.00	2002	D. Haskins AES
800 m	2:24.90	2017	L. Leibel TAISM
1,500 m	5:01.60	2017	L. Leibel TAISM
3,000 m	11:10.00	2013	D. Hernandez AISC
4x100 m relay	55.3	1979	AES
4x400 m relay	4:35.50	2008	AES
Shot put	12.09 m	2020	M. Guene OSC
Discus	30.99 m	2020	M. Guene OSC
Long jump	4.86 m	2002	D. Haskins AES
High jump	1.49 m	2001	A. Hollingworth OSC

=== Girls 13–14 ===
Event	Time/Distance	Date	Name/School
100 m	12.77	1998	I. Greenfield ISOI
200 m	27.2	1998	I. Greenfield ISOI
400 m	1:00.89	2020	C. Obasi ASB
800 m	2:31.10	2024	C. Watte OSC
1,500 m	5:16.92	2009	J. Holborow AES
3,000 m	11:36.10	2009	J. Holborow AES
4x100 m relay	54.5	1979	KAS
4x400 m relay	4:41.43	2005	AES
Shot put	10.42 m	2025	A. Gooden LS
Discus	29.63 m	1998	E. Werszko AISD
Long jump	4.70 m	2024	C. Watte OSC
High jump	1.58 m	2020	M. Frankenberger AISD

=== Boys 13–14 ===
Event	Time/Distance	Date	Name/School
100 m	11.43	2018	T. Russell AISD
200 m	24.68	2004	R. Bamako ASD
400 m	55.45	2004	D. Haskins AES
800 m	2:14.51	2019	L. Mafart OSC
1,500 m	4:39.45	2020	N. Mbele AISD
3,000 m	10:16.52	2019	L. Mafart OSC
4x100m relay	49.04	1997	KAS
4x400 m relay	4:05.58	2026	AISD (Basnet, Rahman, Mallory, Villigram)
Shot put	12.43 m	2010	B. Freil AES
Discus	39.33 m	2003	E. Palmer ISOI
Long jump	6.00 m	2003	D. Haskins AES
High jump	1.73 m	2003	A. Hollingworth AES

=== Girls 15–19 ===
Event	Time/Distance	Date	Name/School
100 m	12.58	2018	A. Al Mughairi TAISM
200 m	27.16	2005	E. Muzenga AES
400 m	1:01.99	2026	C.Watte OSC
800 m	2:27.91	2026	Z.Al-Wir ACS
1,500 m	5:10.52	2026	Z.Al-Wir ACS
3,000 m	11:20.46	2026	Z.Al-Wir ACS
4x100 m relay	53.53	2005	AES
4x400 m relay	4:28.64	2005	AES
Shot put	9.65 m	1999	E. Werszko AISD
Discus	27.14 m	2026	A. Gooden ASB
Long jump	5.24 m	2020	A. Al Mughairi TAISM
High jump	1.56 m	2020	A. Al Mughairi TAISM

=== Boys 15–19 ===
Event	Time/Distance	Date	Name/School
100 m	10.81	2018	C. Mazyck ACS
200 m	22.78	2018	C. Mazyck ACS
400 m	52.73	2026	A. Metin ACS
800 m	2:07.90	2014	R. Jawaid KAS
1,500 m	4:31.69	2018	E. Locke AISD
3,000 m	9:52.38	2019	T. Balestri TAISM
4x100 m relay	45.96	2018	R. Silva, H. Azhar, J. Wright, L. Hettiaratchi OSC
4x400 m relay	3:45.64	1993	ISOI
Shot put	14.68 m	2006	C. Bousquet OSC
Discus	46.42 m	2007	C. Bousquet OSC
Long jump	6.81 m	2008	C. Bousquet OSC
High jump	1.91 m	1993	H. Weddig ISOI

== See also ==
- Karachi Inter-School Sports League
