= Consulate General of the United States, Chennai =

American consulate in Tamil Nadu, India

Coordinates: 13.052405°N 80.251932°E

Consulate General of the United States of America in Chennai
- சென்னை அமெரிக்கத் துணைத்தூதரகம்
- Seal of the United States Department of State

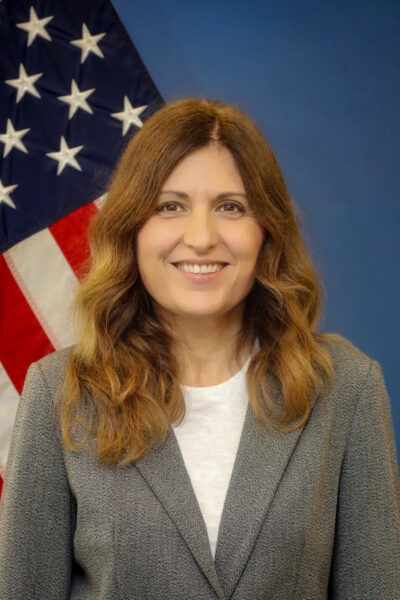
- Incumbent; Mariana L. Neisuler since 2 March 2026
- United States Department of State
- Style: Consul General
- Nominator: President of the United States
- Term length: 3 years
- Inaugural holder: William Abbott as U.S. Consular Agent
- Formation: 24 November 1794
- Website: Official website

The Consulate General of the United States of America in Chennai represents the interests of the United States government in Chennai, India and surrounding regions. The consulate reports to the ambassador at the U.S. Embassy in New Delhi. The current Consul General, the 28th, is Mariana L. Neisuler, incumbent since March 2026. She was preceded by Christopher W. Hodges.

Ranked one of America's biggest adjudication posts in the world, the Chennai Consulate also ranks first globally in processing employment-based visas, ranks among the top globally in issuing 'L' and 'H' category visas, and ranks eighth globally in terms of all category of visas being issued. As of 2009, about 20,000 visitors enter the consulate every month to obtain a range of services, including the American Library and cultural and educational programs conducted by the Consulate General.

== Location ==
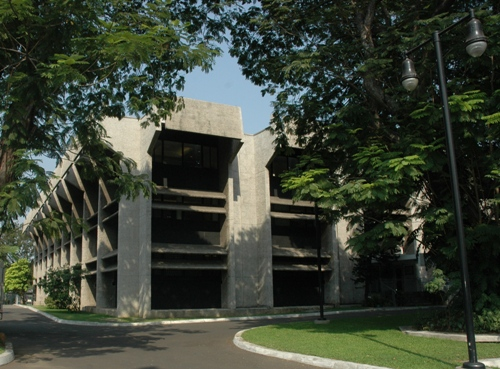
The Chennai U.S. Consulate General building

The Consulate General building is located at 220 Anna Salai, and abuts the Oxford University Press building. The building stands at the intersection of Anna Salai and Cathedral Road on the Gemini Circle facing the Anna Flyover on a land leased for long-term from St. George's Cathedral and has entrance on both roads. Both the Consulate General and the American Library Center are located in the same building.

== History ==
Trading links between the United States and the East India Company's territories began when the American ship Chesapeake sailed up the Hooghly to anchor in Calcutta in 1786, just ten years after the United States Declaration of Independence. On 19 November 1792, the then American President George Washington appointed Benjamin Joy, a businessman from Newburyport, Massachusetts, as the first American Consul to India. With the advice of the then Secretary of State Thomas Jefferson and consent of the Senate, President Washington commissioned Joy to that office on 21 November 1792. When Joy reached Calcutta in April 1794, the colonial government repudiated his commission. However, he was permitted to 'reside here as a Commercial Agent subject to the Civil and Criminal Jurisdiction of this Country ... ', and he stayed in Calcutta and served as the commercial agent of the American government.

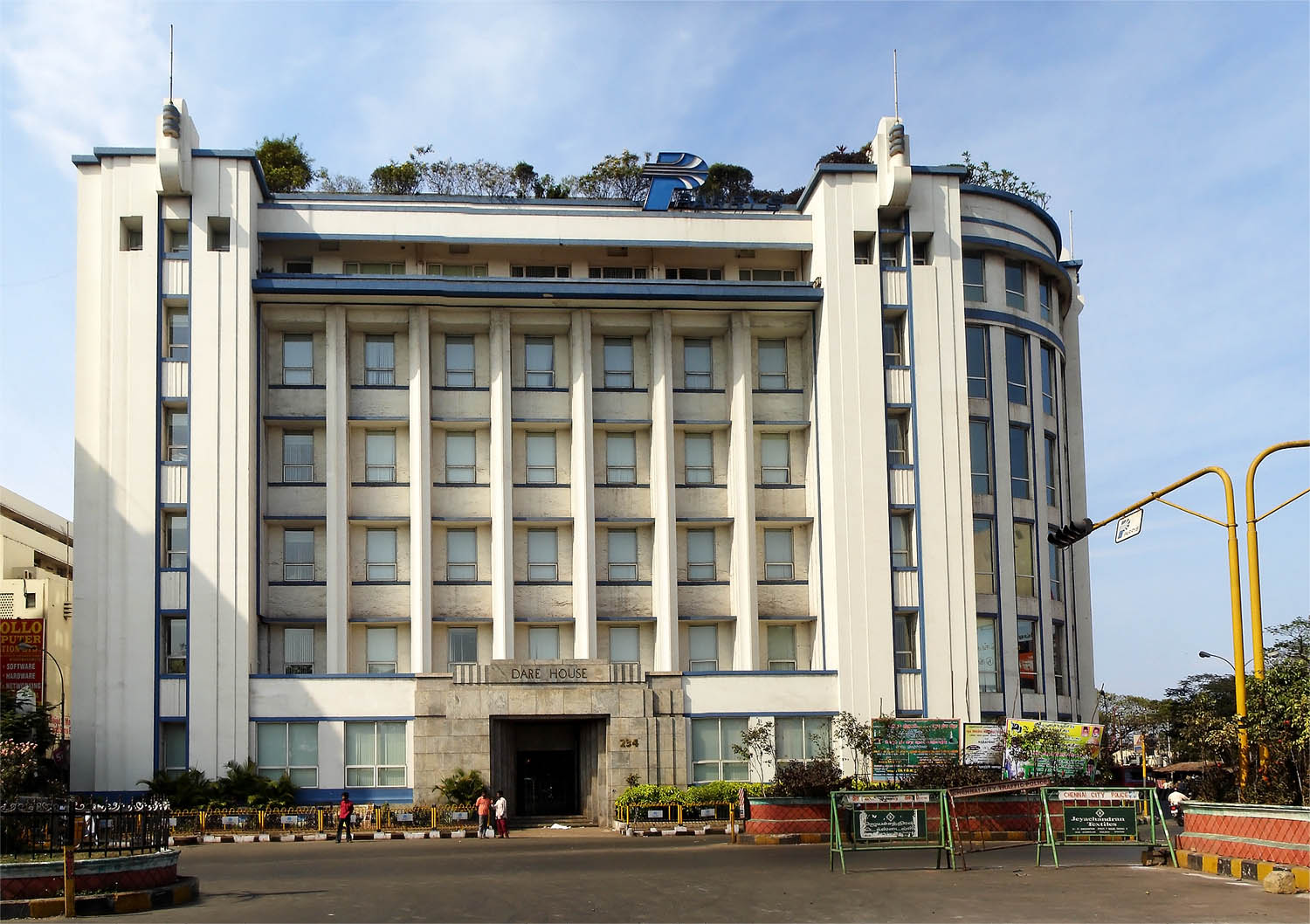
Dare House at Parry's Corner, where the Consulate General was located from 1940 until the 1950s

To manage U.S. maritime interests in South India, Joy appointed William Abbott, a British-born American merchant, as the first American consular agent of the Madras Presidency on 24 November 1794, who served for more than a decade. Abbott was actively engaged in politics and even served as the mayor of Madras for a brief period in 1797. The trade between the United States and the city involved cotton, tea, spices, and leather from South India and "blocks of ice hewn from the frozen lakes of Massachusetts." The Indo-American trade experienced a hiatus for several decades that followed, and, when it revived, a separate U.S. consular agency was established in Madras on 24 May 1867 with Joseph L. Thompson, of Massachusetts, serving as the consular agent to Madras. He served till October 1872. The consular agents in Madras were expected to report directly to the State Department of the U.S. government. The post continued as a consular agency under the Consulate General at Calcutta until 1908. The main role of the consular agents during those times was to promote trade and business interests of the United States, and most consular agents between 1867 until 1908 were selected from the ranks of expatriate businessmen.

The Reorganization Act of 5 April 1906 regularized consular service with fixed tenures of office, fixed salaries, a system of promotion, and seven position classes including consuls general and consuls. This changed the prevailing trend, and in June 1908, the post of consular agency was raised to the rank of a consulate. In December 1908, with the recommendation by the U.S. Department of State, Nathaniel B. Stewart was appointed as the first representative of the American government with the title of Consul in Madras, who served the next two years. An office was established with the official status as a consulate on the third floor of a building owned by Parrys and Company, located on No. 1 China Bazaar Road, now known as Netaji Subash Chandra Bose Road, at Parry's Corner. Later, the office moved to a building between Rajaji Salai and Moore Street. When the building was demolished and built as a modern six-storied building, now known as Dare House, the U.S. Consulate continued its tenancy by occupying the fourth floor of the building in October 1940.

With India gaining independence, the American diplomatic post in Madras was officially raised to a Consulate General on 15 August 1947, marking a milestone in the bilateral relationship between the two countries. On the same day, Roy E. B. Bower became the last consul and the first consul general in Madras in independent India. With Parry's Company wanting the whole building in 1952, the Consulate had to look for new premises. Five years later, in the 1950s, the Consulate General moved to a building on Mount Road (the present-day Anna Salai), currently occupied by the Bank of America. With the expansion of the Indo-U.S. relations after Independence, the Consulate General required a purpose-built structure to accommodate a diversity of activities such as library services, cultural programming, educational exchange, visas, American citizen services and development assistance, along with the ancient standby, trade promotion. For this purpose, the Consulate General leased out a parcel of land on the Gemini Circle from the Church of South India to build its own building. On 3 January 1969, the Consulate General moved to its present location at the Gemini Circle, which was inaugurated by Ambassador Chester Bowles.

In June 2022, the consulate celebrated its 75 years of diplomatic relations with independent India.

== Architecture ==
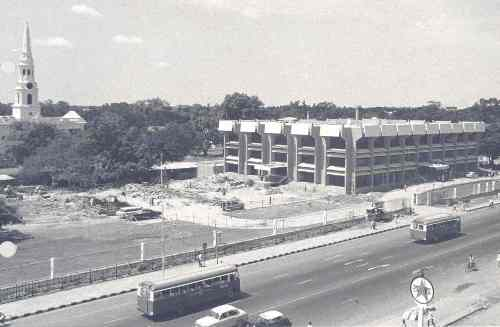
The Chennai Consulate General Building in 1969

The American consulate building was designed by the New Orleans firm Burt, Lebreton and Lamantia, combining the American architecture of the 1960s and features of traditional South Indian architecture. The architecture of the consulate building was inspired from the traditional houses of Thanjavur and Karaikudi. The American architect hired to design the building traveled around South India in search of inspiration before zeroing in on the final theme. As quoted by S. Krishnan, who accompanied Lamantia on his architectural quest in Tamil Nadu and parts of Andhra Pradesh, Lamantia, whose roots were in Don Quixote's village, chose the architecture of the traditional houses of Thanjavur and Chettinad to blend with the American style in his design plan. Thus, the rectangular Consulate General building was built around a roofless central courtyard, with verandahs running around it and rooms opening out of them. In addition, inspired by the South Indian temple architecture, the four exterior walls were studded with chips of Pallavaram granite.

The building has a library space in the second floor. It also has a large auditorium.

A new office building of the Consulate General was planned in 2008 to be built in about five years. It still has not been built, but plans still remain.

== Consular District ==
The Chennai consular district, covering three states and three union territories of the country, serves a population of about 160 million and includes seven official languages used daily in the post's visa operations. An increasing middle-class population in the region who intend to travel abroad, increase in demand for skilled workforce in the United States, and the transformation of the Indo–U.S. relationship led to an increase in visa demand in the Chennai consular district in recent years. The demand for non-immigrant visas in Chennai increased by more than 80 percent between 2004 and 2007, peaking at around 280,000 in 2007. In response, the post added staff and interview windows and improved its training, fraud prevention, and workload management, making the wait times for non-immigrant visas stable at less than a week.

Owing to the drastic increase in visa demand from the Chennai district in the recent years, the embassy at New Delhi designated all of India as one consular district. This enabled people seeking visa appointments in New Delhi and Calcutta even if they traditionally live in the Chennai consular district.

== Functions ==
The Chennai Consulate serves the Chennai consular district, which includes the states of Tamil Nadu, Karnataka, Kerala, and the union territories of Lakshadweep, Puducherry, and the Andaman and Nicobar Islands. The Consulate processes applications for both immigrant and non-immigrant visas to the United States. The Consulate provides U.S. citizens with assistance and support in aspects such as passport replacement, CRBA, notary public services, registration in the embassy ward system, and renewals of passports. The consulate reports through the Embassy of the United States in New Delhi. The country-level coordination office for Fraud Prevention Programme is located in the Chennai consulate. The Chennai Consulate General has a virtual consulate at Bangalore, which does not process visa applications.

The consular section at the Chennai Consulate has been expanded eight times since 1988 and was designed to process 2,500 visa applications annually. In 2004–2005, the Chennai Consulate General processed approximately 8,600 immigrant visa cases, issuing 5,300. The consulate no longer processes immigrant visas.

From 1 December 2011, the Chennai Consulate General became the only center in the country to receive and process blanket L category visas meant for managers, executives, or specialized knowledge professionals transferring within their company. From 1 January 2012, the center stopped processing immigrant visa petitions.

The Chennai Consulate is one of America's biggest adjudication posts in the world and the number one globally in processing employment-based visas. It is ranked among the top globally in issuing 'L' and 'H' category visas for workers and professionals and is ranked eighth globally in terms of all category of visas being issued, along with the ones in Mumbai and New Delhi coming within the top 10 globally in the volume of visas. The number of visa applications processed at the Consulate increased threefold between 1998 and 2008. In 1998, almost 79,000 people applied for visas at the Consulate, which increased to 237,306 applications in 2007. The Chennai Consulate issued 142,565 non-immigrant visas in 2010 — the most among Mission India's five consular sections, up from 7,500 non-immigrant visa applications in 1992. The Consulate conducts an average of 1,200 to 1,400 interviews every day, which has gone up to 1,800 in a day, with an average refusal rate of 20 percent. In 2017, the Consulate General adjudicated more than 305,000 visa applications.

With more than 300 employees, the Chennai Consulate processes 900 applications a day of which around 500 to 600 are 'B1' and 'B2' visas for temporary stay in the United States. Over 20,000 people visit the Chennai Consulate every month to obtain services ranging from visits to the American Library to visa services.

Till 2005, the fraud prevention unit (FPU) of the Chennai Consulate General was home base for the India country coordinator for consular fraud-prevention programs, a position later transferred to the embassy in New Delhi. The Chennai Consulate General's quarterly India Fraud Bulletin has been reviewed by the Department of State.

The community liaison office at the Chennai Consulate General publishes a newsletter Chennai Masala.

== Staff ==
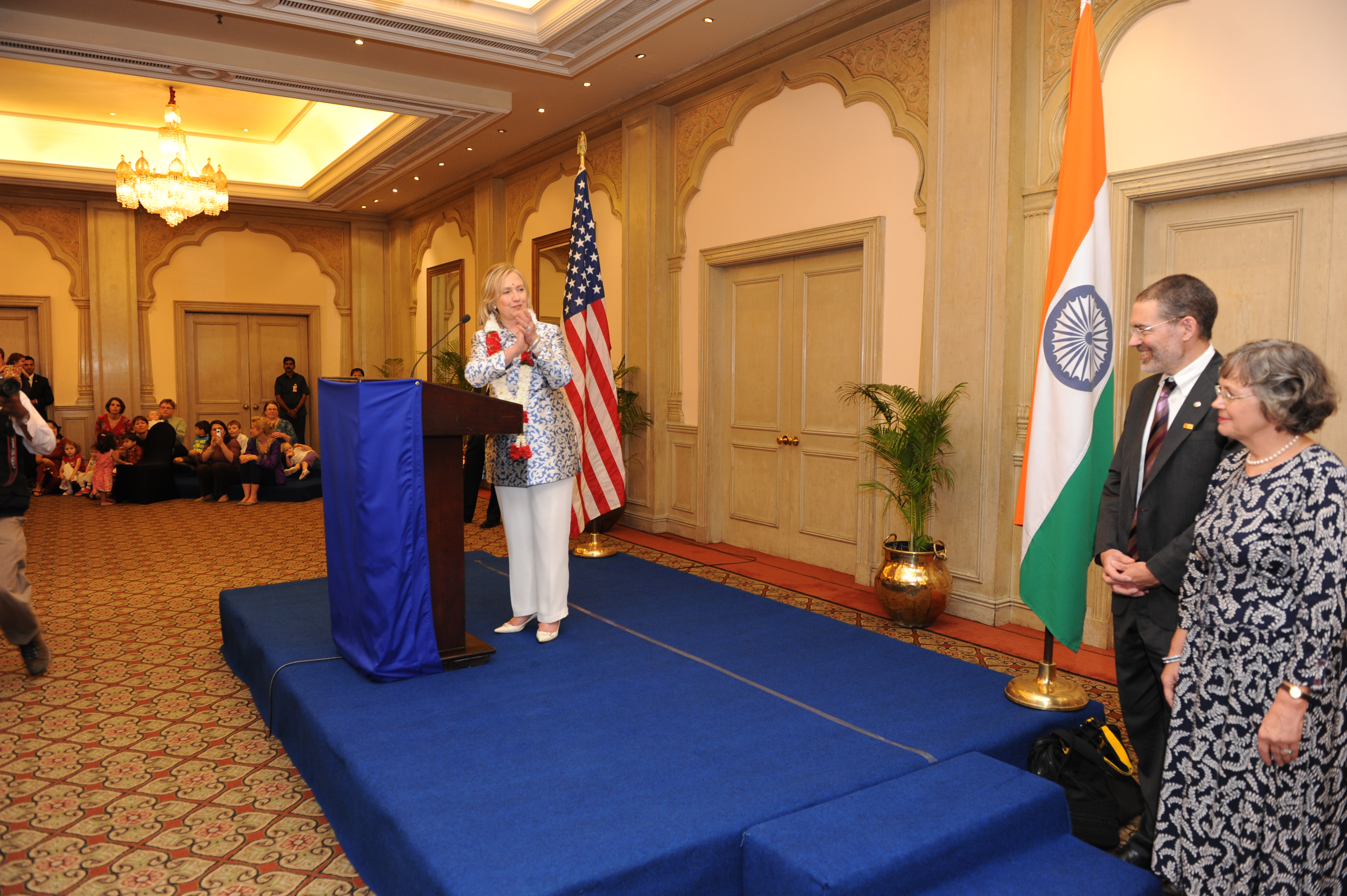
U.S. Secretary Hillary Clinton delivers remarks to staff and family members of the Chennai Consulate General during her visit to the city in 2011

The Consulate General is headed by the Consul General, who directs its activities for a tenure of three years. As of 2005, there were 20 foreign service officers in the Chennai Consulate General, up from five officers in 1999. Despite this increase in staff, the Chennai Consulate General cannot cope with the NIV demand due to heavy workload.

=== List of Consuls General ===
Rank	Portrait	Name	Term	Notes
1		Roy E. B. Bower	1947–1950	First consul general after the diplomatic post was upgraded as a consulate general
2		Robert B. Streeper	1950–1953	
3		Waldo E. Bailey	1953–1956	
4		Robert M. Taylor	1956–1959	
5		Henry C. Ramsey	1959–1962	
6		Thomas W. Simmons Sr.	1962–1965	
7		Albert B. Franklin	1965–1968	
8		Thomas M. Recknagel	1968–1971	
9		Stephen E. Palmer Jr.	1971–1973	
10		John Eaves Jr.	1973–1976	
11		Charles W. McCaskill	1976–1979	
12		Douglas M. Cochran	1979–1982	
13		Daniel F. Waterman	1982–1985	
14		John D. Stempel	1985–1988	
15		Thomas M. Fiske Timberman	1988–1990	
16		Ernestine S. Heck	July 1990–July 1993	First female consul general of the Madras post
17		Timothy P. Hauser	1993–1996	
18		Michele J. Sison	1996–1999	Second female consul general of the Chennai post
19		Bernard J. Alter	1999–2002	
20		Richard D. Haynes	August 2002 – April 2005	
21		David T. Hopper	September 2005 – September 2008	
22		Andrew T. Simkin	September 2008 – August 2011	
23		Jennifer A. McIntyre	3 August 2011 – 17 September 2014	Third female consul general of the Chennai post
24		Phillip A. Min	18 September 2014 – January 2017	
25		Robert G. Burgess	4 August 2017 – September 2020	
26		Judith Ravin	6 September 2020–July 2023	Fourth female consul general of the Chennai post
27		Christopher W. Hodges	31 July 2023–2 March 2026	
28		Mariana L. Neisuler	2 March 2026-present	Fifth female consul general of the Chennai post

== The American Library ==
Logo of the American Library

The American Center Chennai, formerly known as the American Cultural Center and the American Library, is located in the Consulate premises. The American Library was founded in 1947 as part of American Consulate at Dare House with a collection of 800 books. Later, the library along with the United States Information Service (USIS) moved to the Vummudiar building at 162 Mount Road, with a small reading room with attached library. In 1951, the library was again shifted to the Addison Building on Mount Road. Libraries in Bangalore, Hyderabad, Trivandrum and Guntur were organized under USIS Madras in the 1950s, and after the closure of all the regional libraries in 1969, the Chennai American Library started serving patrons throughout South India. Since 1969, the current American Consulate General building became the permanent home for the library. Ambassador Chester Bowles, who formally opened the new building, called it the 'highest point in the deep friendship and close relations between India and the U.S.' In 2000s, the library began taking materials to people by organizing road shows and traveling exhibitions in several South Indian cities. In September 2004, the Chennai American Library established an American Corner in Bangalore in partnership with the Bharathiya Vidya Bhavan. In January 2008, the library participated in the annual Chennai Book Fair. Of the 700,000 visitors who attended the book fair, over 8,000 people visited the American Library stall and 438 signed up for new library memberships.

Presently, the library has a collection of over 15,000 books, 140 journals, U.S. Government publications, reports, newspapers and others, in addition to access to more than 10,000 full-texts of journals and 30,000 other electronic documents. The collection is particularly strong in the areas of American studies, American literature, management, law, international relations, environmental studies, and English as a second language. The collection can be accessed through the computerized Online Public Access Catalog (OPAC), which contains the complete holdings of all the four American Libraries in India in Chennai, Kolkata, Mumbai, and New Delhi, available on the World Wide Web. The library functions from 9:30 am to 5:00 pm on all days except Sundays. The library also has an office of the U.S.–India Educational Foundation functioning on second and fourth Saturdays of the month.

Since 11 April 2009, the library is open to public on Saturdays, after nearly a decade. On 31 May 2012, Consul General Jennifer McIntyre launched a new, bi-monthly e-newsletter at the American Library, which aimed to provide updates on new books, articles, and documentaries, as well as list additions to the library's electronic collection of books and articles.

=== Events ===
The American Center and the American Library together host several cultural events. The library also hosts Saturday Matinee, a popular event on Saturday mornings in which American movies are shown for the public and members of library inside the center.

== Programs ==
In 2001, the Global AIDS Program (GAP) of the Centers for Disease Control and Prevention (CDC), an agency within the Department of Health and Human Services, opened its office in Chennai to prevent the HIV epidemic in India in partnership with National AIDS Control Program.

== Incidents ==
- In January 1998, a small bomb was detonated under the Gemini Flyover near the Consulate building.
- In 2011, U.S. Vice-Consul Maureen Chao was criticised for her controversial remark on the complexion of the local people.
- On 14 September 2012, the Consulate was attacked by a group of protesters, when a protest by Islamic organisations against controversial American film Innocence of Muslims turned violent, following which the Consulate shut down its visa section for two days on 17 and 18 September. The attack resulted in injuries to twenty-five protesters.
- In November 2014, a terror plot allegedly by Pakistan's Inter-Services Intelligence (ISI) to execute terror strikes in the Chennai Consulate General was foiled by the Indian authorities. The plot was code named "wedding hall" which was to be executed by two terrorists called "cooks" who were to gain entry into India from Maldives. The bomb devices that were to be planted at the Consulate General were code named "Spice".
- In December 2015, floods covered the city, including the consulate, which reportedly had up to 4 feet of water in the lower floors. Pictures on the walls of the consulate depict this event.

== See also ==
- List of diplomatic missions in Chennai
- India–United States relations
- List of diplomatic missions of the United States
- Foreign policy of the United States
- Foreign relations of India
- Embassy of the United States, New Delhi
- Consulate General of the United States, Hyderabad
- Consulate General of the United States, Mumbai
- Consulate General of the United States, Kolkata
