= American Embassy School, New Delhi =

International school in New Delhi, established 1952

American Embassy School

Location
- Chandragupta Marg, Chanakyapuri; New Delhi, Delhi 110021; India; 28°35′57.15″N 77°10′56.25″E

Information
- Type: Independent
- Established: 1952
- High school principal: Iftekhar Syed
- Head of School: Rand Harrington
- Faculty: Faculty and Staff: 368; includes 94 teachers and 88 US Citizens
- Grades: Pre K-12
- Enrollment: 1,037 (2022); 463 Elementary PK-Grade 5; 243 Middle; 331 High
- Average class size: >12 students upper 18 students middle
- Campus: Suburban
- Colors: Black and gold
- Mascot: Tiger
- Annual tuition: $27,450-$33,605
- Website: School Website

The American Embassy School (AES), New Delhi, India, is an independent, co-educational day school that offers an educational program from pre-kindergarten through Grade 12. The school's student body represents more than 70 nationalities, with U.S. citizens as the largest population. It is adjacent to the Embassy of the United States in the city's Chanakyapuri diplomatic enclave.

== History ==
The school was founded in 1952, following the U.S. Embassy's correspondence to the Union Government of India to request a school for American expatriate children.

Jonathan Payne DuPont, author of the PhD thesis "Teacher Perceptions of the Influence of Principal Instructional Leadership on School Culture A Case Study of the American Embassy School in New Delhi, India," stated that the school's population grew in the 2000s due to an increase in India's economic status.

In 2019, R Vervoort, B Blocken, and T van Hooff did a scientific study at the school regarding reducing particulate matter at the school.

== Admission and demographics ==
U.S. citizens are given the first priority for admission, provided the applicant meets the school's eligibility criteria. Eligibility in all other cases is limited to children whose parents or legal guardians hold a foreign passport, are temporarily residing in India and based in New Delhi, and the student lives with the parent or legal guardian. An Indian citizen applicant must meet all three of the following criteria to be eligible to apply for admission:

- the parents of the student are likely to stay in India for a period of 2 to 3 years,
- the student should have come from an American/international system of education (outside of India with the exception of the American School of Bombay and the American International School of Chennai) and has to return to the American/international system of education,
- the student is in a critical stage of education and studying at AES is important for the student's education. The American Embassy School defines ‘critical stage of education’ as Grades 9–12.

In the 2008–2009 school year, there were 1,348 pupils, with U.S. citizens being about 39%, Koreans making up about 17%, and the remainder coming from about 50 other countries. 690, 363, and 295 students each were in elementary, middle, and high school. From the 2000–2001 school year to the 2008–2009 school year there was an increase of students of Indian heritage who were not Indian citizens, from 136 to 351. The number of Indian citizens enrolled went from 48 to 52, respectively. In 2014 Jen Psaki, the spokesperson of the U.S. State Department, stated approximately about one-third of the students were U.S. citizens.

The school experienced a temporary drop in enrollment due to the COVID-19 pandemic. At the beginning of the 2020–2021 school year, enrollment was 954, representing 59 nationalities with the U.S. being the most common country of origin. (Pre-K to Grade 5: 415; Grades 6-8: 213; and Grades 9-12: 326). During the same school year, there were 166 faculty members. Average tenure at AES is 4.4 years and average years of experience is 17 years.

== Organization ==
The AES Board of Governors has nine voting members who serve two-year terms with an option to continue for a third year. Seven are elected by the school's Association, which includes all parents and faculty; two are appointed by a majority of the Board. The Board also has two non-voting members appointed by the U.S. Ambassador; the School Director also serves as an ex-officio board member.

The school's English motto is "Enter to Learn, Leave to Serve." Its Latin motto is "Domi ac foris," meaning "At home and abroad."

== Curriculum ==
The curriculum is that of a general academic, college-preparatory school. The school's testing program includes the College Board tests (SAT, SAT II, PSAT). Instruction is in English; French, Spanish, and Mandarin are taught as foreign languages. English-as-an Additional Language services are offered for non-native English speakers. The school also offers the International Baccalaureate Diploma and support programs for students with special needs. Most of the graduates go on to universities in the United States and other countries. The school is accredited by the Middle States Association of Colleges and Schools.

== Facilities ==
The school campus is spread over more than 12 acres and includes two libraries, a 25-meter swimming pool and toddler pool, a physical education center with two gymnasiums, "Makerspaces," three playgrounds, four clay tennis courts, grass and artificial soccer pitches, and a performing arts center. Before his death in 2015, Indian artist Nek Chand visited the school as an artist-in-residence and donated a series of sculptures, which are displayed around campus.

Beginning in 2015, the school has responded to air quality concerns in Delhi by adding air monitors and advanced filtration systems to all indoor academic space. and creating additional indoor play space options for recess periods. The air quality index (AQI) in most indoor spaces now remains below 50 throughout the school day. Since 2017, the school has also added filtration systems to its faculty housing and installed outdoor air cleaners to improve the air quality in its high school atrium.

The United States government leases the land that the school occupies.

== School activities and sports ==
Extracurricular activities include team sports, performing arts, dance, visual arts, academic games, TaeKwonDo and other interests such as chess, climbing, and visiting historic sites and nature preserves such as Rathambore National Park. The school is a member of MESAC (Middle East South Asia Conference) for Grades 8–12 and ASIAC (American Schools in India Activities Conference) for Grades 6–8.

The school used to be part of The South Asian Inter-Scholastic Association (SAISA), competing as the "Falcons" and the school colors were red and white. During the 1960s, the school adopted its current mascot, the Tiger.

The school has an active service learning program and a range of community outreach activities for students, faculty, and families. The "Reach Out" program and other initiatives enable students to interact with people from the "jugghi" or slums near the school, including constructing a library and studying area to promote literacy. The high school's 12 community service clubs include Make a Difference, Rights for Children, Blind Relief Volunteers, and more. More than 80% of high schoolers participate in community service programs. The school is also the chartered organization for Cub Scout Pack 3060 and Scouts BSA Troop 60.

As of 2015, the school has a rule regarding how much pollution is permissible for students to do outdoor classes and athletic activities.

== Notable alumni ==
- Aisha Chaudhary, Indian author, motivational speaker
- Timothy Geithner, former U.S. Secretary of the Treasury, attended AES and has visited the school in his official capacity while in India
- Mythili Raman, American lawyer, graduated AES in 1987
- Alankrita Sahai, model and Miss Diva Earth 2014
- Hannah Simone, actress, attended at age 16
- Uma Thurman, actress, attended the school in 1979 while she lived in India

== Notable guests ==
- U.S. President Dwight D. Eisenhower visited the school on 11 December 1959.
- Indian Prime Minister Jawaharlal Nehru visited the school in 1961.
- First Lady Jacqueline Kennedy visited the school in 1962.
- American poet Louis Untermeyer visited the school in 1962.
- American actor Kirk Douglas visited the school in 1964.
- Indian Prime Minister Indira Gandhi visited the school in 1965.
- Musician Ravi Shankar visited the school in 1970.
- The Dalai Lama visited the school on 8 April 2016.
- U.S. Secretary of State John Kerry visited the school on 31 August 2016.

During the school's first 50 years, other notable American visitors included astronaut Pete Conrad, artist Norman Rockwell, heavyweight champion and activist Muhammad Ali, and actors Gregory Peck and Kirk Douglas.

== Controversy ==
In January 2014, following the Devyani Khobragade incident in the United States, the school was placed under investigation by the Indian government for alleged tax and visa fraud by its faculty. Since that point, the school has raised its tuition and is strictly following visa, work permit and tax regulations for all its teachers.

== See also ==
- Americans in India
- U.S. Embassy in New Delhi
