= Bahawalpur House =

Coordinates: 28.624839°N 77.234002°E

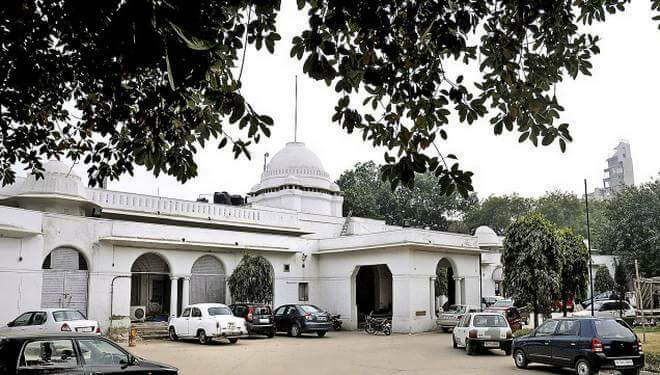
- Interactive map of the Bahawalpur House area

General information
- Location: Delhi, India

Bahawalpur House is the former residence of the Nawab of Bahawalpur in Delhi. It is located at Sikandra Road 1 and Bhagwandas Road.

== History ==
After India's independence in 1947, the palace was used temporarily by the American Library from 1969 until February 1974. After that, the National School of Drama made its headquarters in the house. The National Institute of Kathak Dance also has a space there.

In 2011, the construction of the Delhi Metro threatened the structure. Through protests, the construction plans were amended to circumvent the historic building.
