= Safiya al Bahlani =

Omani artist

- Born: 1986 (age 39–40); Oman
- Education: TAISM
- Occupations: Artist; activist
- Known for: Activism, motivational speaking

Safiya al Bahlani (born 1986) is an Omani artist, graphic designer, disability rights activist, and motivational speaker.

== Early life and education ==
Al Bahlani was born in Oman with multiple physical disabilities: short forearms, no hands, a deformed left knee, and a short right leg stump. Safiya was adopted at the age of three by Sabah al Bahlani, a single mother. Sabah al Bahlani had been trained in the United States as a Community Health Educator and was working at the time for the Ministry of Health in Oman in a program to educate parents about children with disabilities.

Sabah took Safiya to the United States with her when she went to continue her studies. In the United States, Safiya al Bahlani was given intense speech therapy. She had speech difficulties as a child and when tested was found to be totally deaf in one ear, as well as tongue-tied. Al Bahlani also had surgery to make it easier for her to wear a prosthetic.

In school, Safiya excelled in the arts. She had been drawing since she was a child, but it was when she turned fourteen that she realized that she wants to become a professional artist. After graduating from the American International School of Muscat, she continued to study graphic design. When she moved to Jordan in 2007, she chose to change her interest in study to animation, but she continued to paint and held her first solo art exhibit in Jordan with 38 pieces that she had collected in February 2010.

== Career ==
Al Bahlani returned to Oman and was looking for a job when she met an Omani fashion designer. Together they created an exhibit of 40 paintings and 20 dresses based around a theme of His Majesty's Annual speeches. She felt that doing oil and acrylic paintings of the designs was not creative enough; she embellished the paintings with embroidery and traditional Omani tassels. This exhibit was held in March 2011.

Her second solo exhibit, 'The Growing Journey', was held in December 2012, at the Bank Muscat and included over 70 paintings. In 2016 she had a solo exhibition, entitled 'Flashback' at the Centre Franco-Omanais.

In 2018, Al Bahlani opened her own gallery, which launched with artwork created in collaboration with a jewellery designer, Hannah Al Lawati. In 2018, Al Bahlani was selected to create visual designs and branding for Al Mouj Muscat's environmentally-responsible transportation buggies.

=== Speaker ===
Al Bahlani has spoken a number of times on the subject of being a creative artist and a person with disabilities. Her first TEDx talk, "The chosen: Sabah al Bahlani and Safiya al Bahlani" was at TEDx Muscat in November 2013. In this talk, she and her mother spoke about the circumstances that brought them together and how they feel that everyone has a unique purpose. Her next TEDx talk, "Challenge is Your Weapon" was at TEDx Institute Le Rosey in January 2014.
