= The American International School Muscat =

Coordinates: 23.568550°N 58.382657°E

The American International School of Muscat
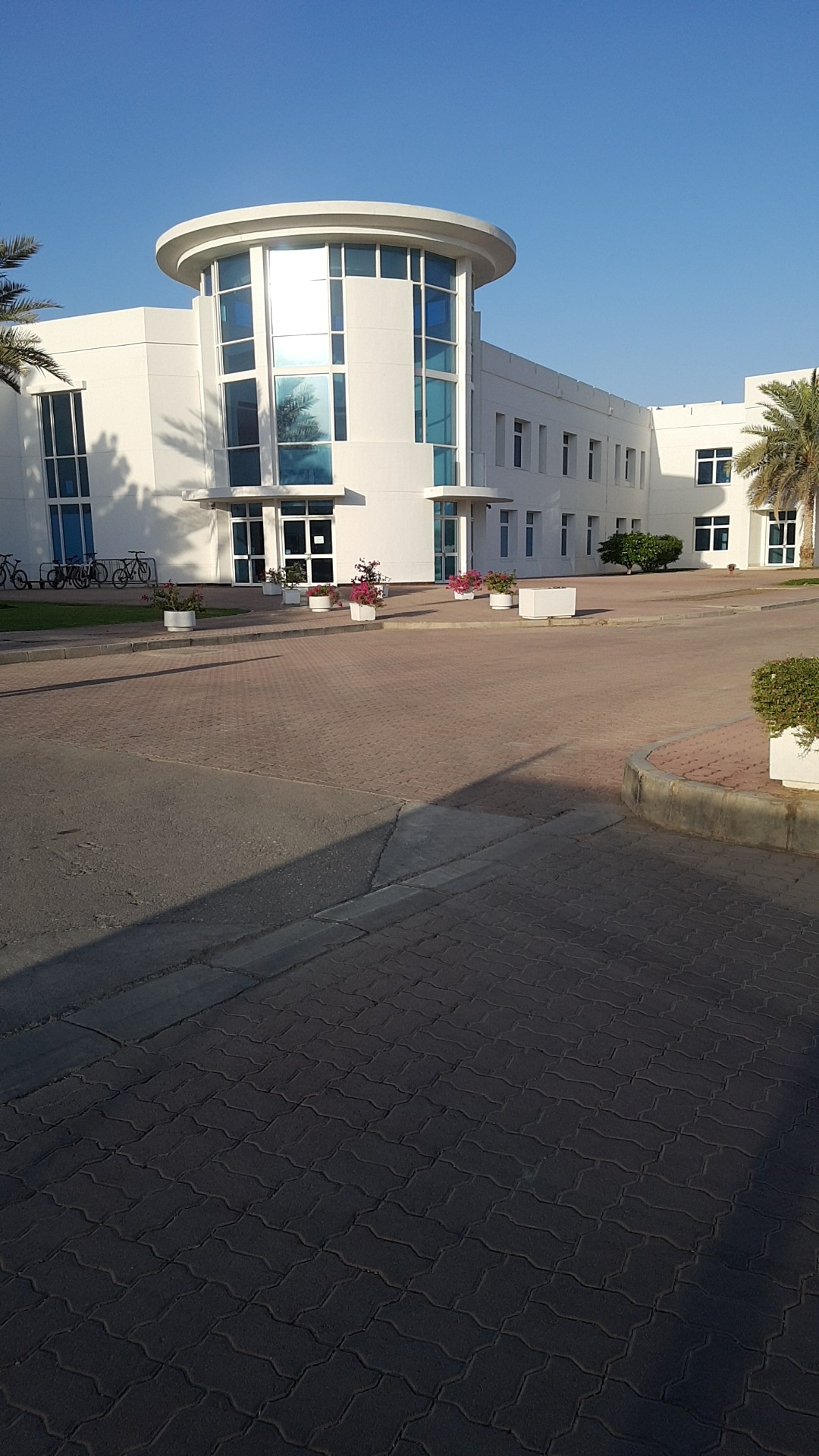
- High-school wing of TAISM
- Muscat; Oman

Information
- Motto: Rise to the Challenge
- Opened: 1998; 28 years ago
- Head of school: Peter Lee
- Grades: Early childhood - 12
- Enrollment: 720
- Colors: Red, White, Blue
- Mascot: Eagles
- Website: www.taism.com

The American International School Muscat (TAISM) is a non-for-profit, co-education, American curriculum international school in Muscat, Oman, serving early childhood through high school. Established in 1998, it is the sole American-only curriculum school in Oman.

As of 2020, the school had 720 students, who have come from 62 other countries.

TAISM is a member of the SAISA League.

== History ==
In September 1997, the 1996-1999 US Ambassador to Oman, Frances D. Cook, spearheaded an Organizing Committee to turn the idea of a high-quality American international school in Oman into a reality. The US Embassy officials approached the Omani government and presented this idea, which was approved by the then-incumbent monarch of Oman, His Majesty Sultan Qaboos bin Said, who prioritized education as part of the development of the country. The ruling monarch then donated a huge parcel of land in the Ghala district where they can build a permanent campus.

The school began operations in September 1998 with 120 students in a rented newly-constructed three-story school complex in Qurum 16, opposite Madinat Sultan Qaboos. In December of that year, the 1989-1993 U.S. President George H. W. Bush came to Oman as part of a diplomatic tour of the Gulf Cooperation Council nations, wherein he led the permanent campus' dedication and groundbreaking ceremony, laying the first cornerstone on December 3, 1998.

Six months after the entry of the new millennium, Kevin Schafer joined TAISM as the new director, and the school moved to the current campus in August 2000. The new campus was inaugurated in January 2001.

By 2002, the student enrollment increased to 275, prompting an expansion of the campus in 2003. These included newer elementary classrooms, music rooms, science labs, art studios, an expanded library, and the Early Childhood Center. With the tripling growth of more students again in 2005, the third phase of expansion was executed. The Sur Library, O’Shaughnessy Gallery, Blue Gym, and the Student Center/Cafeteria, were also renovated by this point.

The school underwent more improvements such as an additional wing housing all-new Elementary and Middle School classrooms, and a large atrium featuring a student-created mosaic, which were completed for the 2010-2011 school year. In May 2012, the school's Donald and Eloise Bosch Center for Performing Arts was completed and opened, with a second sports field completed by the next year.

School year 2015-2016 saw the inauguration of three new libraries and three new cafeterias for Elementary, Middle and High School students. In April 2018, the school celebrated its 20th anniversary.

== Heads of School ==
- Katherine O’Shaughnessy: 1998-2006
- Kevin Schafer: 2006-2024
- Peter Lee: 2024–present

== Notable alumni ==
- Safiya al Bahlani, Omani artist and disability rights activist
- Tate McRae, Canadian singer-songwriter and dancer
