= Jhika Gali =

- Town
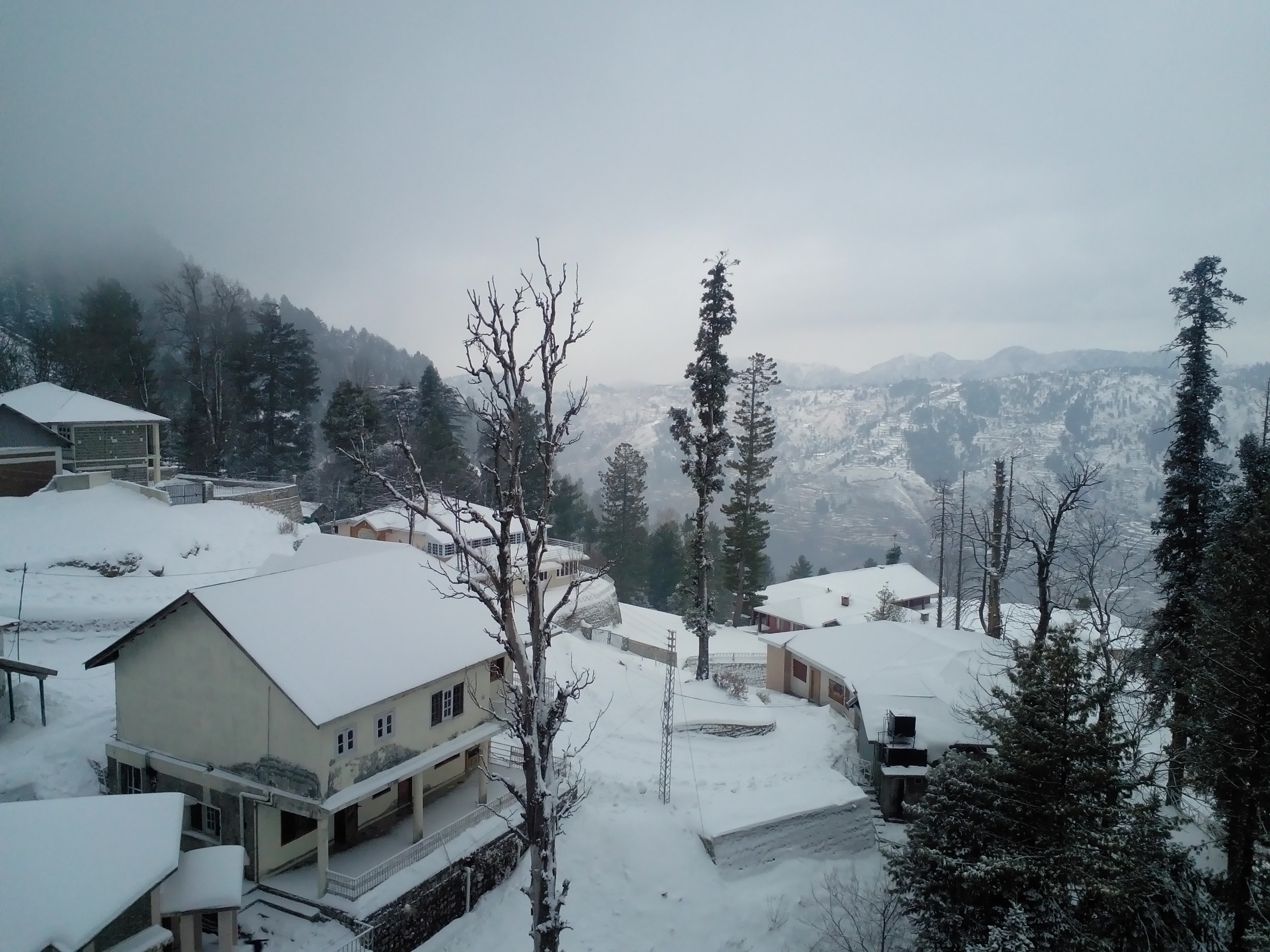
- Jhika Gali in winter

- Location within Punjab, Pakistan Location within Pakistan
- Country: Pakistan
- Province: Punjab
- District: Murree
- Tehsil: Murree
- Founded: 1900
- Time zone: UTC+5 (PST)

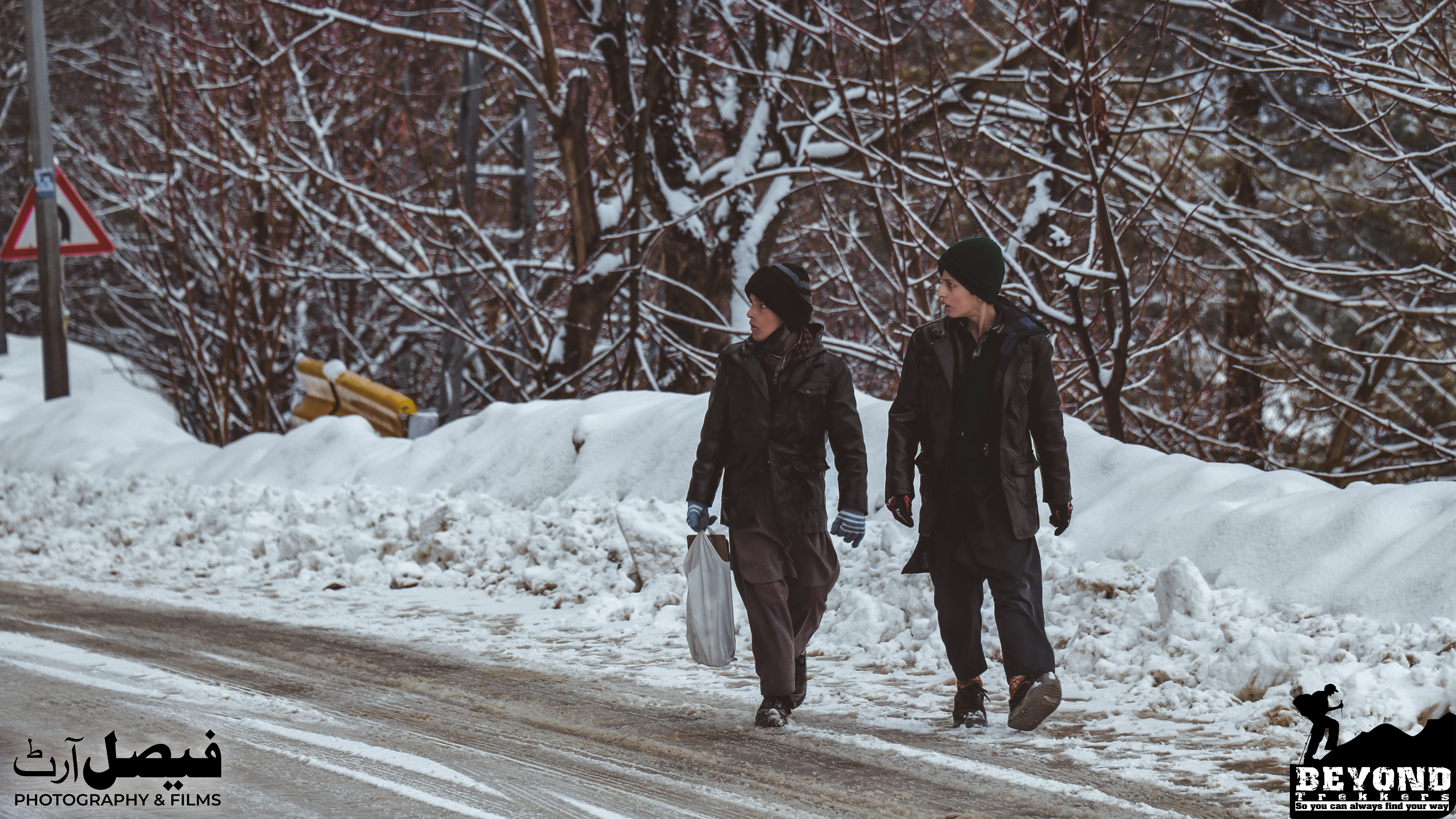
Two students going to school in Jhika Gali

Jhika Gali - is a town in Murree Tehsil, Murree District, Punjab, northern Pakistan. It is located on the Rawalpindi to Murree road and contains boarding schools. Although known as a tourist resort, the town hit headlines on the 5th of August 2002 when six people were killed when gunmen attacked the Murree Christian School which was located in the town.In January 2022 the army set up a camp in the town as a base for operations to rescue stranded tourists in the Murree area. In February 2026 it was announced that as part of the Murree Development Plan, roads in Jhika Gali will be widened by the demolition of structures deemed to have been illegal built by the roadside.

== History ==
Jhika Gali was founded in 1900 during British colonial rule as a small settlement that contained cafes, a cinema and a branch of the Sandes Soldiers' Home. The Sandes Home would later become the MCS boarding hostel.

The area is prone to landslides, in 2008 there were plans for a 13 storey car park to take the traffic burden off the city of Murree however not only did the excavation work on the site cause a landslide but also revealed that the existing road network was at risk and needed stabilisation work. The plans to create the car park was called off as the area was not suitable for the creation of one. In 2025 heavy rains causes a landslide that damaged buildings that caused three families to be homeless.

In January 2022 Jhika Gali, like other areas in Murree, experienced heavy snowfall trapping cars. Also in 2022 a study revealed that landslides in Jhika Gali were mainly caused by increased water saturation, which drastically reduced soil strength. Computer modelling using the GeoStudio programme confirmed that the slope becomes unstable as saturation approaches 95%. However the study revealed that engineering interventions could restore stability even under very wet conditions.

== Infrastructure ==
Jhika Gali serves as an important transit route for tourist travelling to the hill resort of Murree, the Jhika Gali intersection connects tourists and commuters to a number of sites in Murree District and also Khyber Pakhtunkhwa. However the road network sometimes appear to be under strain with traffic jams arising during peak tourist seasons when people from Punjab seek to escape the heat. The Lower Jhika Gali Road connects Jhika Gali with the Mall in Murree, the road has a colonial era memorial to Auriol de Visme of the 8th King's Royal Irish Hussars who died along the road, de Visme had arrived in British India to take part in the Second Anglo-Afghan War.
