= Embassy of the United States, New Delhi =

Diplomatic mission of the United States in India

Embassy of the United States in New Delhi
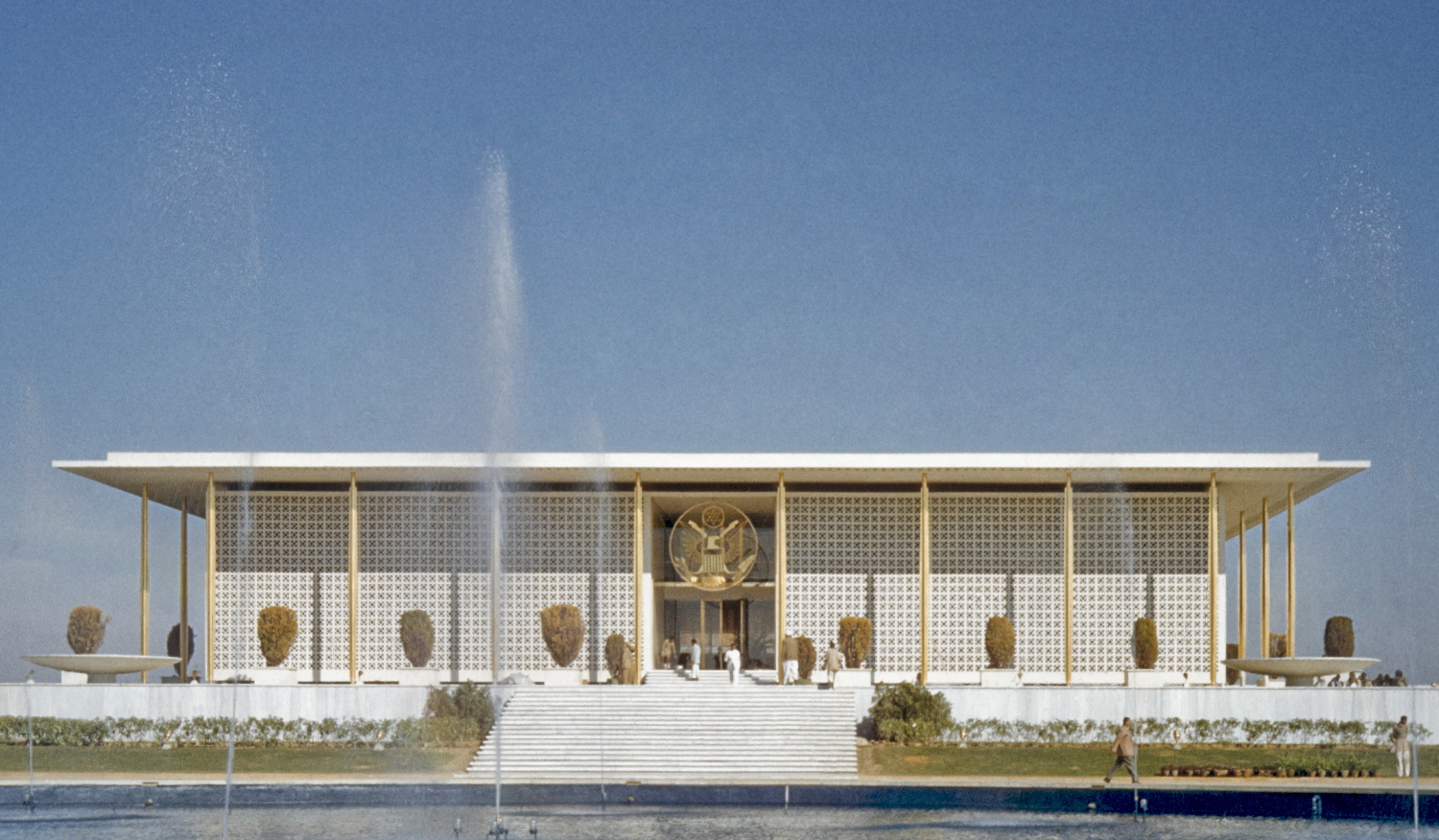
- Address: Panchsheel Marg, Shantipath, Chanakyapuri, New Delhi, Delhi 110021
- Coordinates: 28.5967077°N 77.1848094°E
- Ambassador: Sergio Gor
- Jurisdiction: India; Bhutan
- Website: Official website

The Embassy of the United States of America in New Delhi is the diplomatic mission of the United States in the Republic of India. The embassy is headed by the U.S. Ambassador to India. The embassy complex is situated on a 28-acre plot of land in Chanakyapuri, the diplomatic enclave of New Delhi, where most of the embassies are located. The embassy is also accredited to Bhutan with whom the United States maintains no formal relations.

== History ==
The embassy was initially hosted in leased facilities which then-ambassador Loy W. Henderson identified as insufficient. When the Indian government created the diplomatic enclave of Chanakyapuri, it gave the United States the second pick for selecting property behind the United Kingdom; Henderson selected a "beautiful" 13-acre plot, and although the State Department did not purchase the land then, he persuaded Indian officials to hold it until the government authorized its procurement in 1953, when increased ties and awareness between the two countries as well as Cold War politics placed a new embassy in India atop the foreign service's construction priorities.

The embassy was designed by American architect Edward Durell Stone, then a professor of architecture at Yale University and the designer of Radio City Music Hall. The planning of the embassy began in the early 1950s and the complex includes the Chancery, the Roosevelt House (official residence of the U.S. Ambassador), office space and living accommodations and is located in New Delhi. After traveling to India, Stone submitted a design inspired by Indian temples and monuments, particularly the Taj Mahal, that used a white sunscreen around a structure shaped like a "rectangular donut" with a central tropical water garden featuring plants, fish, and birds. Despite some initial apprehension, it was approved in 1955 following a trip to the site by the commission tasked with evaluating the design.

The cornerstone of the structure was laid by Chief Justice of the United States Earl Warren on September 1, 1956. The building was estimated to cost $2,000,000 and replaced the former Maharajah's palace where the American embassy was previously housed. Warren stated that he hoped the embassy would become a "temple of peace", and became the first contemporary American building constructed following the U.S. State Department's directive that overseas buildings "should be in harmony with cultural, architectural and climatic conditions."

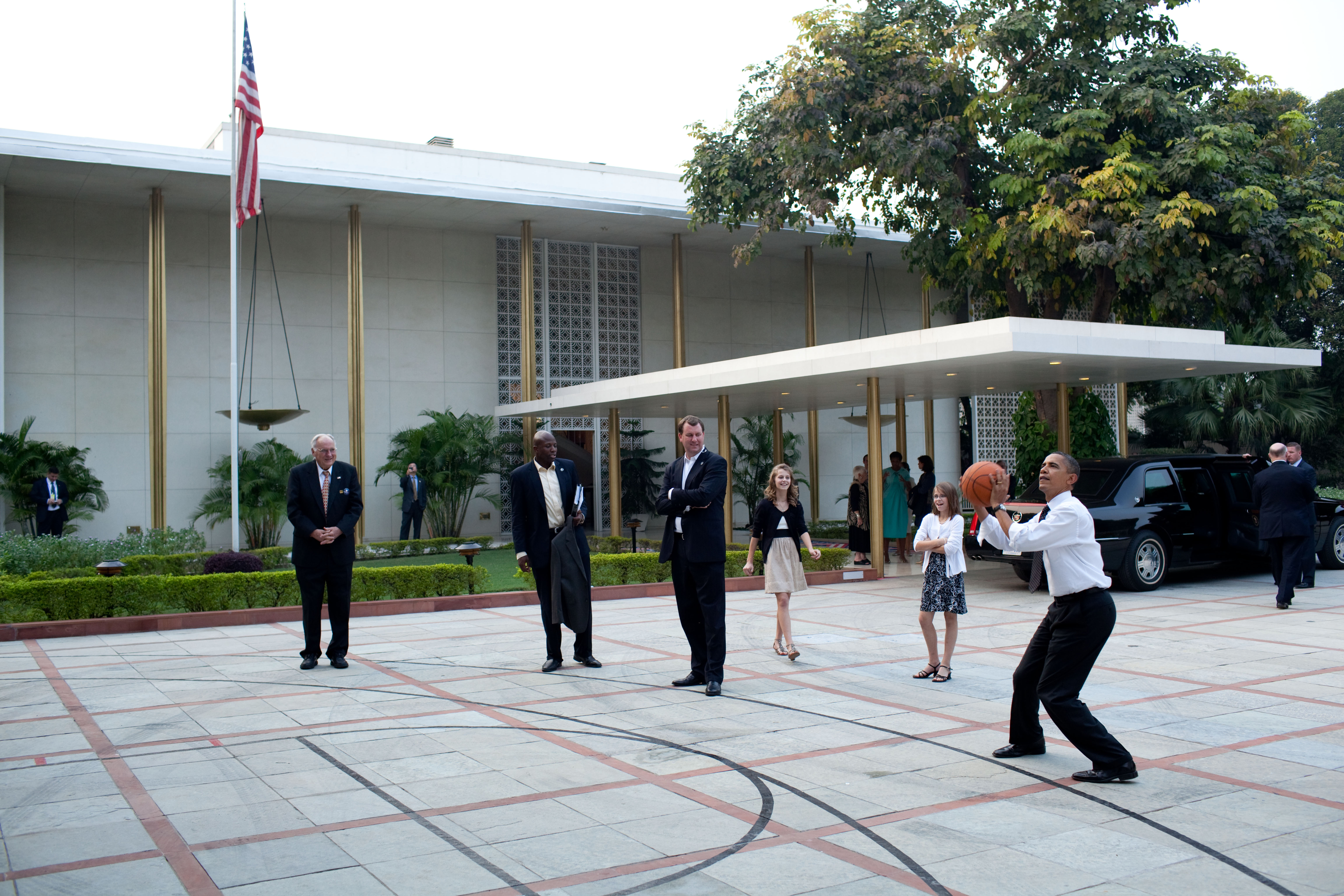
President Obama at Roosevelt House, November 2010, photograph by Pete Souza

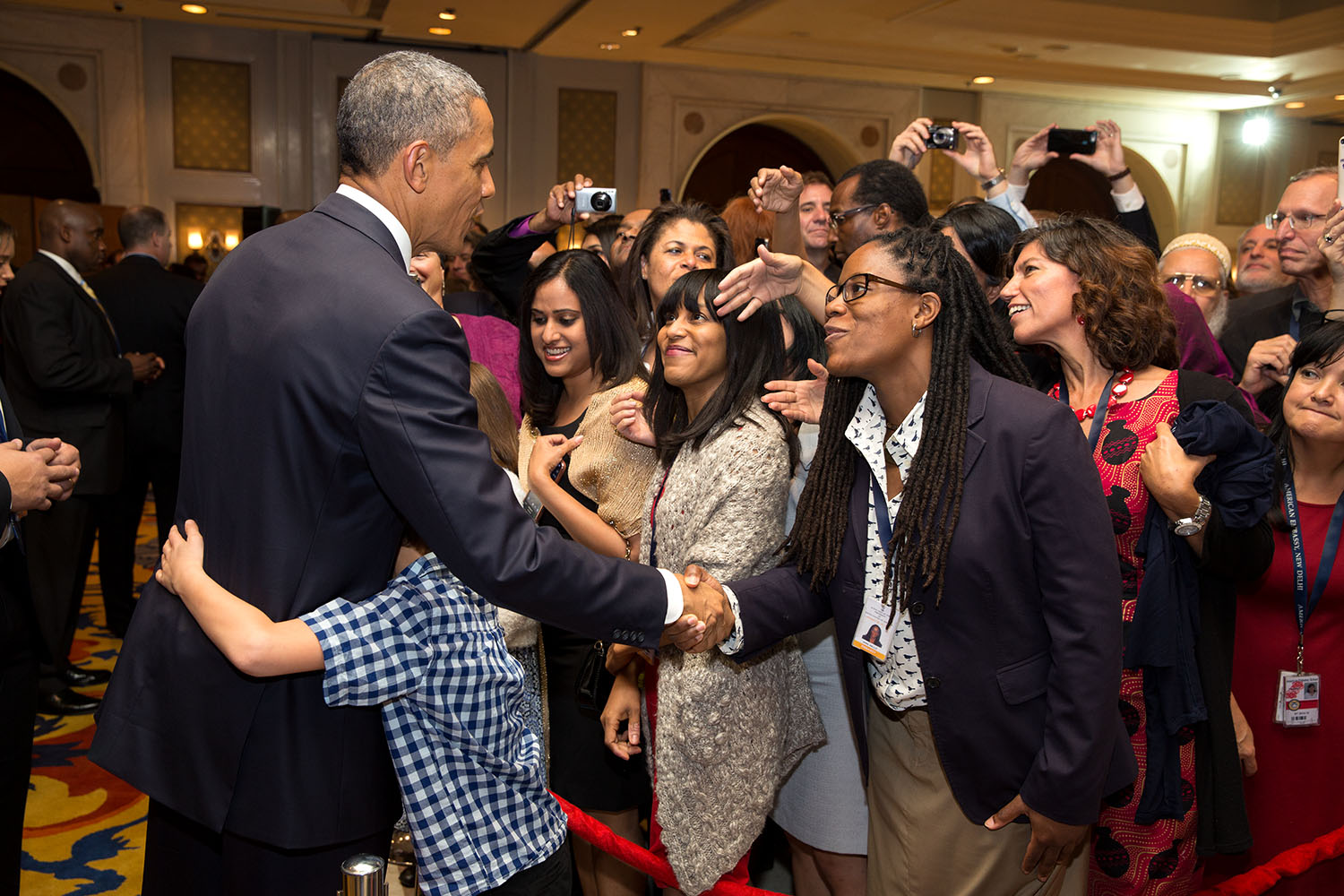
President Obama greets U.S. Embassy personnel in New Delhi, 2015

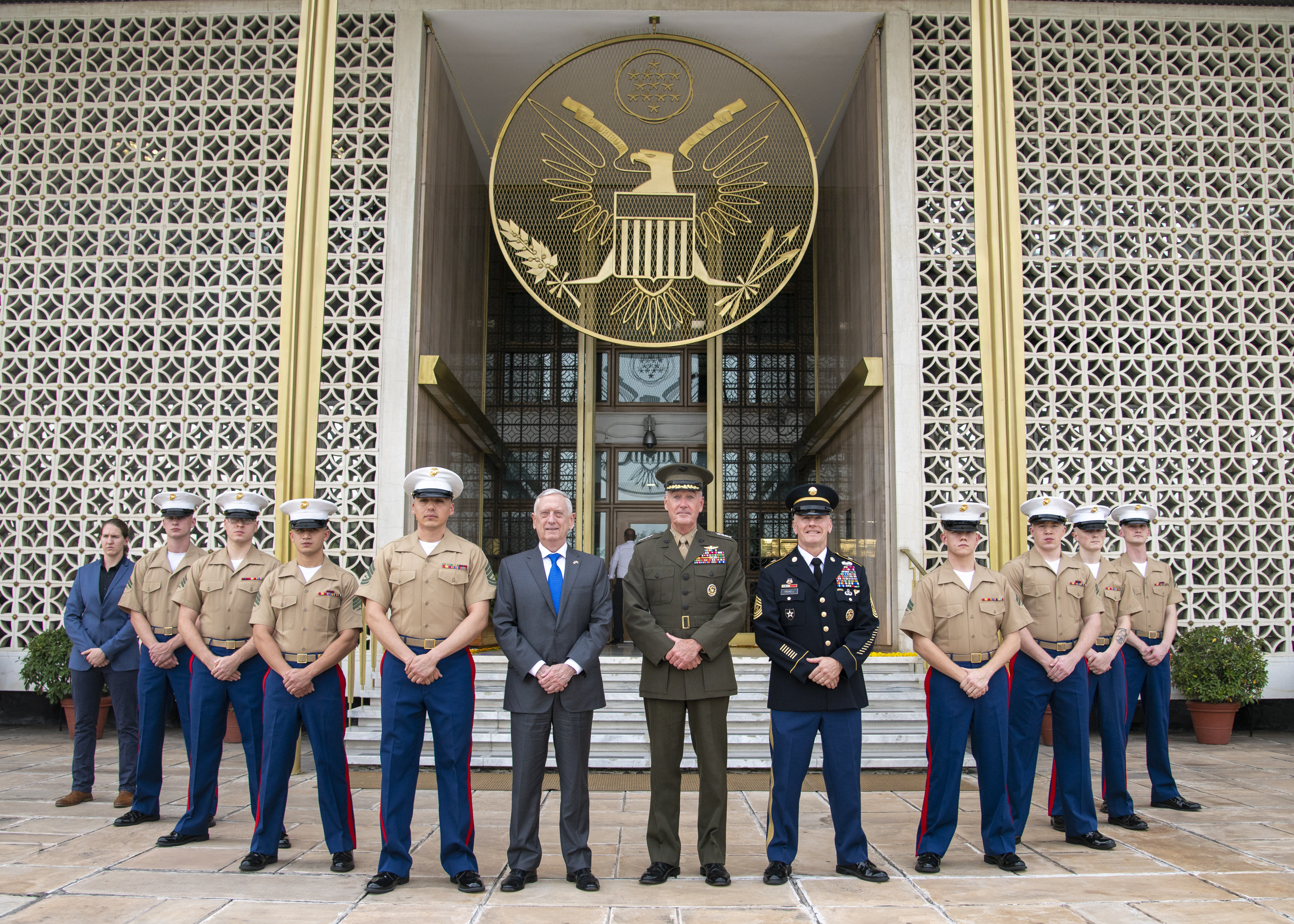
Secretary of Defence Jim Mattis and Chairman of the Joint Chiefs of Staff Joe Dunford with the Detachment New Delhi, U.S. Marine Security Guard at the U.S. Embassy in New Delhi, 2018

The embassy was formally opened on January 5, 1959, in the presence of Indian Prime Minister Jawaharlal Nehru and other dignitaries. Following the opening ceremony, U.S. Ambassador to India Ellsworth Bunker stated, "To me this building is symbolic of what can be achieved through the cooperation of our two countries. From beginning to end it has been a joint venture." Before, during and soon after its construction, the embassy gained became a source of appraisal and fascination for both mainstream publications and architecture journals, particularly during Jacqueline Kennedy's 1962 goodwill tour of India and Pakistan. Upon its opening, The New York Times called the embassy "probably the most elegant in the world."

An incident of sexual assault in February 2020 occurred on U.S. Embassy grounds when Indian police revealed a 5-year-old girl had been raped. The U.S. Embassy, which took action immediately, informed the Delhi Police of the matter. The alleged was arrested and charged with rape, per Delhi Police, pending a trial date.

The complex is currently undergoing a major renovation by Weiss/Manfredi, with the new design announced in 2019 and groundbreaking taking place in January 2021. The original chancery building is to remain in use as the plan will both restore current buildings and construct new structures. Construction is expected to finished by 2027.

=== American consulates in India ===
The United States also has consulates in Mumbai, Kolkata, Chennai and Hyderabad, all of which are associated with the U.S. Embassy in New Delhi. The US has declared intent to open consulates in Bengaluru and Ahmedabad.

== See also ==
- India–United States relations
- List of diplomatic missions of the United States
- List of diplomatic missions in the United States
- Foreign relations: United States | India
- List of diplomatic missions in India
- List of diplomatic missions of India
- Embassy of India, Washington, D.C.
- American Library (New Delhi)
- American Embassy School in New Delhi
- See consulate generals in:

- Chennai
- Hyderabad
- Kolkata
- Mumbai
