= Karachi Inter-School Sports League =

The Karachi Inter-School Sports League (better known as KISSL) is a Pakistani sports organisation which pitches the top private and international schools in the city, against each other in sporting tournaments and events played in league based competitions. Only students from Grades 8 to 11 are allowed to participate (both British and American systems). Sports include: cricket, football, basketball, throw ball, volleyball and athletics. A KISSL tournament usually consists of 6 to 8 schools and one chosen venue for the entire tournament, although this may vary depending on the sport being played.

== Members ==
The following is the list of schools that are, or were once, members of KISSL:

- Frobels Education Center
- Bay View Academy
- Clifton Grammar School
- Karachi Grammar School
- Lecole for Advanced Studies
- Lahore Grammar School
- The CAS School, Karachi
- Defence American School
- Karachi American School
- The International School
- Indus Academy
- Bay View High School Karachi
- The City School (Pakistan)
- Foundation Public School
- Avicenna School
- Beaconhouse School System
- St Patrick's High School, Karachi
- Convent of Jesus and Mary (Karachi)
- Habib Public School
- St Michael's Convent School
- Washington International School, Karachi
- Reflections school
- Education Bay School

== See also ==
- SAISA
