= International School of Islamabad =

K-12 school in Islamabad, Pakistan

- Islamabad; Pakistan

Information
- School type: International School
- Established: 1965; 61 years ago
- Grades: Preschool - Grade 12
- Age: 2 to 18
- Language: English

International School of Islamabad (ISOI) is an international school in Islamabad, Pakistan serving K-12. Established in 1965, it moved to its present site in Islamabad in 1975. Previously it was located in Rawalpindi.

The school is considered an elite school in Pakistan and is under the administration of the Embassy of the United States, Islamabad.

== History ==
The United States Military Advisory Aid Group (USMAAG) established a one-room school in Rawalpindi in 1965; the school moved to a prefabricated building located on 4 acres (1.6 ha) of land in January 1966. While the school was in Rawalpindi it served grades K-8. Initially the younger students directly took classes while correspondence course were used for higher grade levels. Wives of UMAAG employees taught the younger students. By January 1966 the school had a superintendent and five teachers hired from the U.S., giving instruction to 35 students.

In 1970 the ISOI board of directors decided to move the school to Islamabad, and in 1975 the current campus, located on a more than 23-acre (9.3 ha) site, and built with a large amount of U.S. government funding, opened.

Several militants attempted to break into the school by scaling the walls in 1979. In 1988 unarmed rocket-propelled grenades originating from an explosion of the Ojhri Camp ammunition depot landed on the school property.

The school's peak enrollment was about 660 students, during the 1992–1993 school year. Various subsequent events resulted in a decline in the school's enrollment. The withdrawal of the United States Agency for International Development (USAID) from Pakistan caused a steady enrollment decline from 1992–1993 until 1997-1997, when the school had 555 students. The U.S. government ordered an attack on Afghanistan in 1998. As a result, the U.S. government evacuated Americans from Pakistan, causing the ISOI enrollment to decrease to 510. Additional declines in enrollment resulted after the September 11, 2001 attacks, the March 2002 Islamabad church bombing, and a 2002 attack on Murree Christian School. There were 165 students in January 2003, an all-time low, but enrollment recovered to 374 in 2007–2008.

Enrollment declined after 2008. After the Islamabad Marriott Hotel bombing in October of that year, the United Nations and other organizations stated that Islamabad was not a family post, meaning employees of those organizations may not have their family members in the same city. Additional events in Pakistan and neighboring countries caused additional enrollment declines.

== Demographics ==
Each year, 30% of the school's students are new students.

Enrollment count:

- January 1966: 35
- 1992–1993: About 660
- 1997–1998: About 555
- 1998–1999: 510
- January 2003: 165 students
- 2004–2005: 297
- 2005–2006: 302
- 2006–2007: 362
- 2007–2008: 374

== Notable alumni ==
- Shahnawaz Bhutto, son of former Prime Minister of Pakistan Zulfikar Ali Bhutto.
- Aaron Haroon Rashid, popularly known as Haroon, a director, producer, musician, pop singer, composer and social activist.

== See also ==
- Americans in Pakistan
