= Murree Christian School =

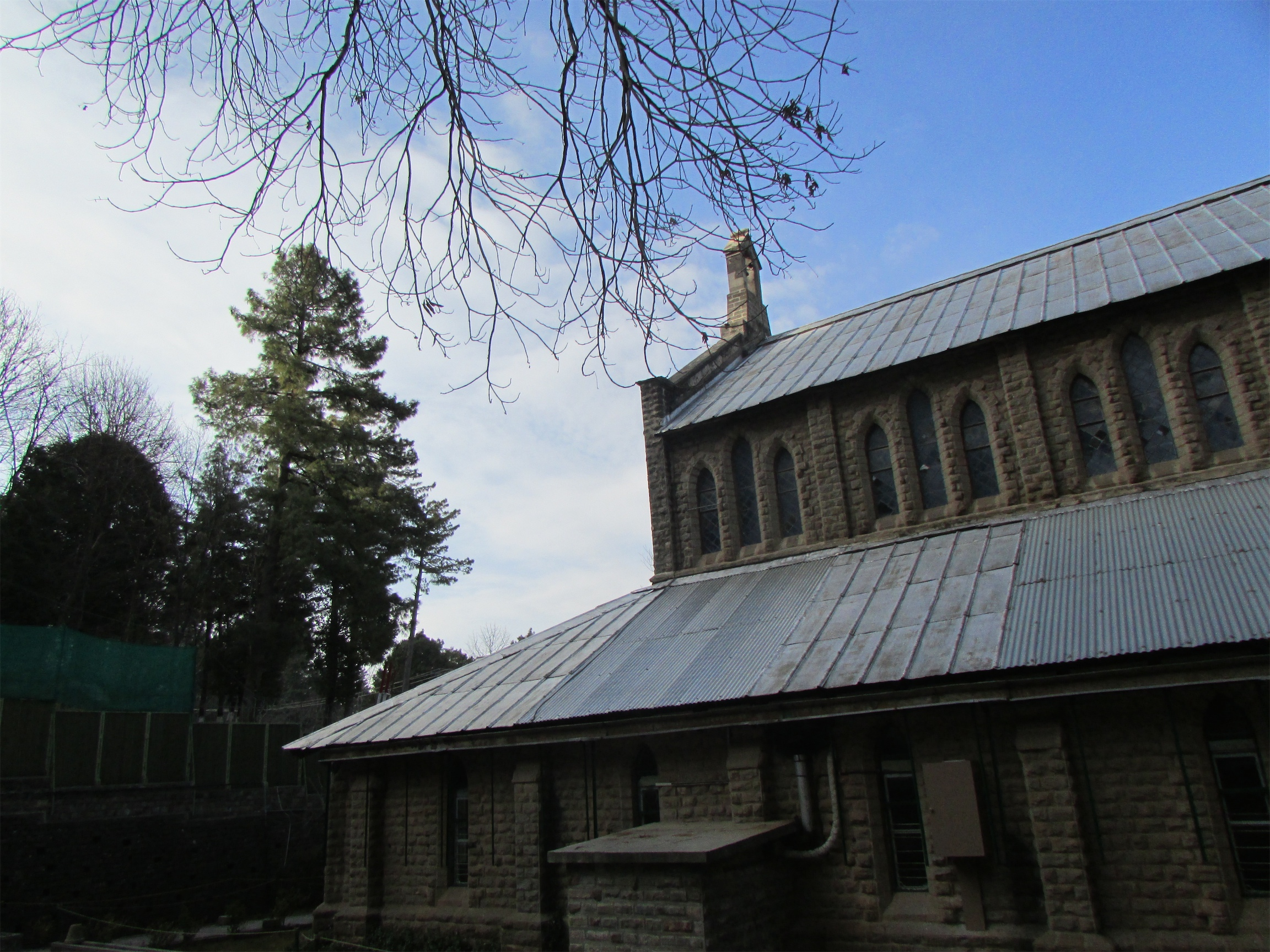

Location
- Coordinates: 33°54′53″N 73°26′01″E

Information
- Founded: 1956
- Closed: 2021
- Website: www.mcs.org.pk

Murree Christian School was a small private boarding school founded in 1956. It closed in June 2021. It was a founding member of the South Asian Inter-Scholastic Association (SAISA) in 1972, and was a highly regarded educational institution in Pakistan. It was located near the resort town of Murree, Pakistan, at over 7000 ft. elevation in the foothills of the Himalayan mountains in Pakistan. The main high school building, made of stone, is a former garrison Church, serving as a Church of Scotland congregation for British soldiers in training in the hill station of Murree, until the church was given to the Anglican Diocese of Lahore during Partition of India and Pakistan in 1947. It was unused until the newly formed Murree Christian School started renovating and refurbishing the deconsecrated church. Several other buildings are used as elementary classrooms, staff housing as well as boarding hostels (dorms). Until 2011, high school boys were housed at a building which was formerly Sandes Soldiers Home, for convalescent soldiers of the British Indian Army.

Murree Christian School is one of the better known international boarding schools on the Indian Subcontinent, established to serve the needs of the expatriate communities in and around Pakistan. It was established after the Partition of India and Pakistan in 1947 which made it increasingly difficult for children to continue to attend other similar schools in India such as Woodstock School in Mussoorie, and Hebron School in Ootacamund, and Kodaikanal International School in Kodaikanal. Attendance in the early 1960s quickly rose to over 100 pupils and the first graduating class was celebrated in 1964. Through the 1970s and up until 2001, the school boasted a multinational community of over 150 students and over 50 expatriate staff from over 25 countries.

== History ==
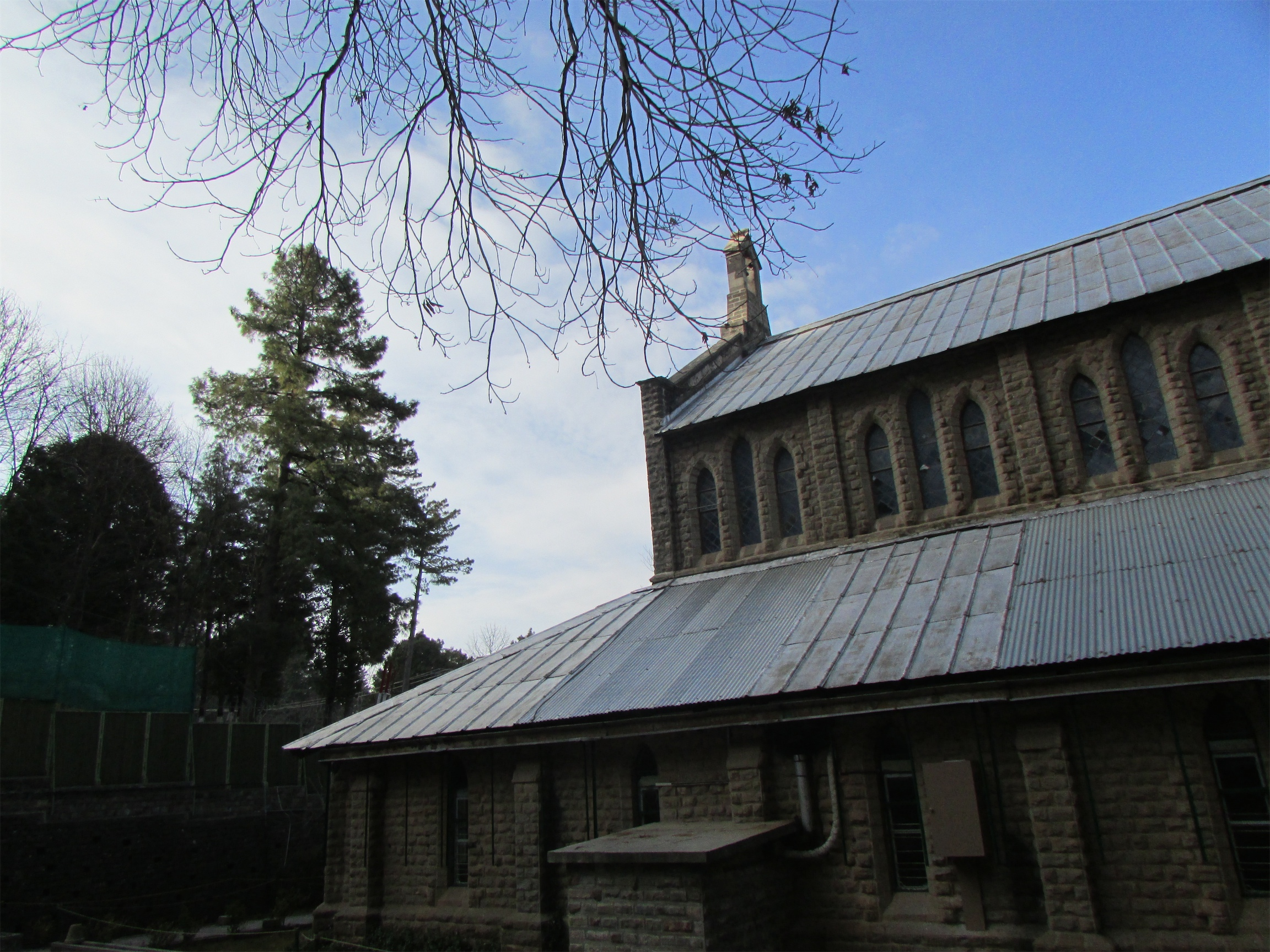
MCS High-School Building.

Murree Christian School was founded in 1956 to educate the children of missionaries in Pakistan and is located near the tiny crossroads town of Jhika Gali which is in the Murree hills of Murree District, Punjab province. The school had been functioning without notoriety until 5 August 2002 when gunmen attacked the school killing six people, none of whom were students or expatriates. The school returned to normalcy with increased security after this attack. Since the mid-1960s, not all students have been from missionary families; some are children of expatriate workers of diplomatic missions, non-governmental organisations, or multinational corporations in Pakistan. Some students were from the small Pakistani Christian community, but because the national curriculum of Pakistan is not taught, Pakistani students have very limited options for tertiary education domestically. Courses are taught in English, with supplementary classes for European and Asian native-language speakers as well as Urdu as a foreign language for students.

== Sports ==
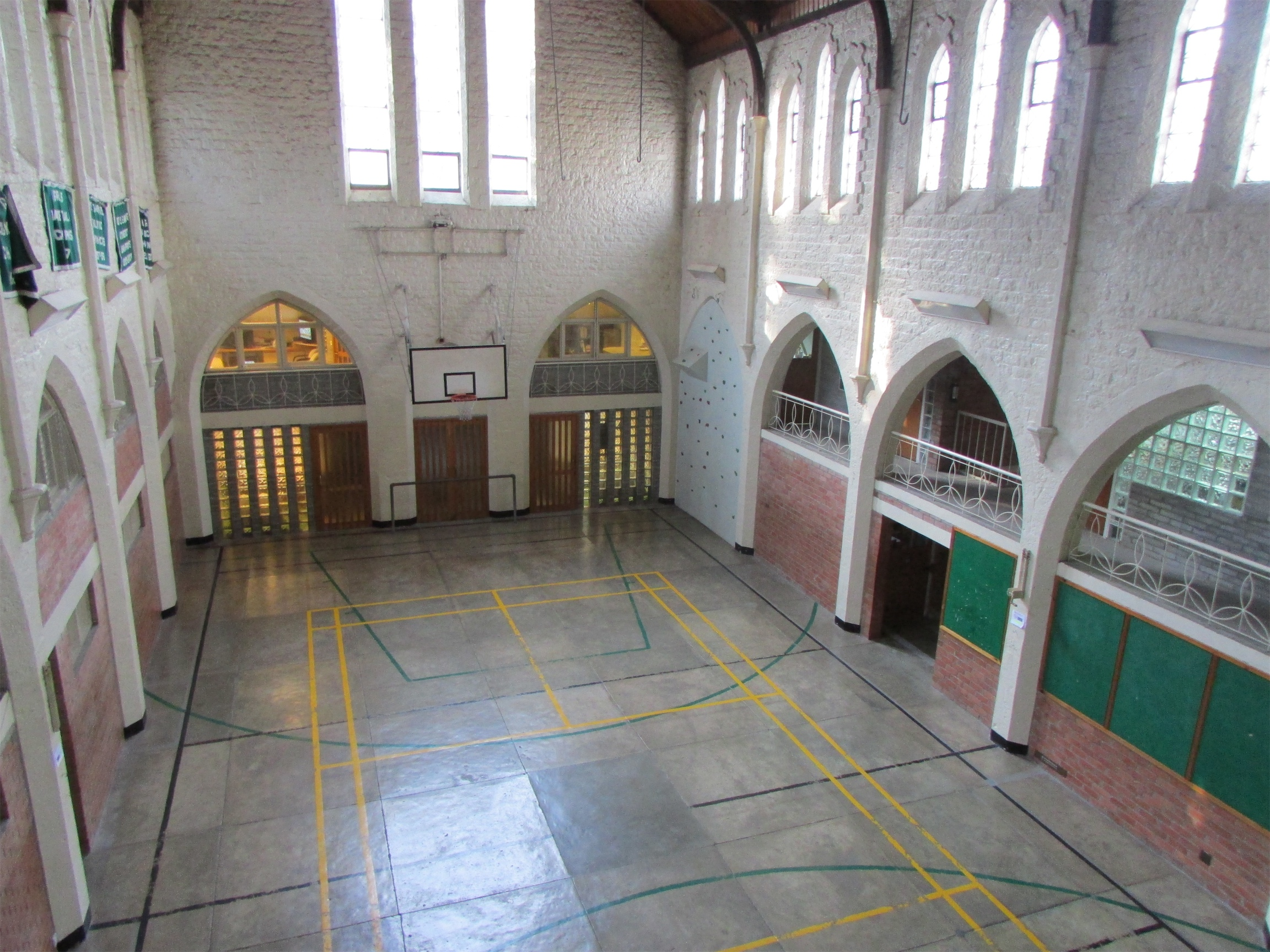
MCS Gym

MCS was the smallest member of SAISA (the South Asia International Schools Association) with enrolment under 100 students after reopening in 2004. SAISA facilitates athletic and cultural interaction with other international schools in the region. MCS students join with students from other schools in South Asia for sports tournaments and occasional fine arts productions. Meeting other students from different backgrounds, forming friendships, sharing victory and defeat are some of the beneficial experiences that MCS students have gained from participating in SAISA events. MCS students also contributed much to the Association through their sense of sportsmanship, manners, cheerful cooperation and team spirit, frequently winning the sportsmanship awards. In preparation for these tournaments, students spent many afternoons after school training and practicing.

== Boarding life ==
=== General information ===
All the elementary boarders were housed in a separate building as a group with the boarding parents. Junior and senior high-school boarders had separate departments divided by gender. Grades 7–9 were in the junior-high boys and girls, and students in grades 10 to 12 were in the senior high boys and girls boarding departments. Normally a husband/wife would work together for each boarding department, but single boarding parents were also allowed especially when staffing was limited.

== Admissions ==
=== General Information ===
Murree Christian School was established primarily to meet the educational needs of the missionary community working in and around Pakistan. Applications were accepted from families working in other areas who understand the historical evangelical Christian background of the school and accept its centrality in school life. Subsequently, the school did contact applicants for an interview. The school also accepted applicants from an English as a Second Language (ESL) background on the condition that they have English proficiency and prior English-language schooling experience.

The school did not admit students from Muslim backgrounds due to Pakistani regulations.

== Education ==
=== Elementary curriculum ===
In the Elementary Department the aim was to give the children a strong foundation across the curriculum. It had a staff of one full-time teacher and benefitted from the input of many other staff on a part-time basis.

The curriculum covered all general subjects: math, English, science, Bible, social studies, computing, art, music, technology, library skills, personal and social education and physical education. Courses were adapted and extended as necessary in order to meet the varying needs of children from many different parts of the world. When staff was available the school also offered English as a Second language as well as German, French, Urdu and Korean.

Homework was given each day to be completed in study hall.

Elementary students took the IOWA tests of educational development each spring.

The National Institute for Learning Disabilities (NILD) was available to students with learning disabilities.

When possible the school was able to offer general music lessons as well as private lessons in piano and other instruments.

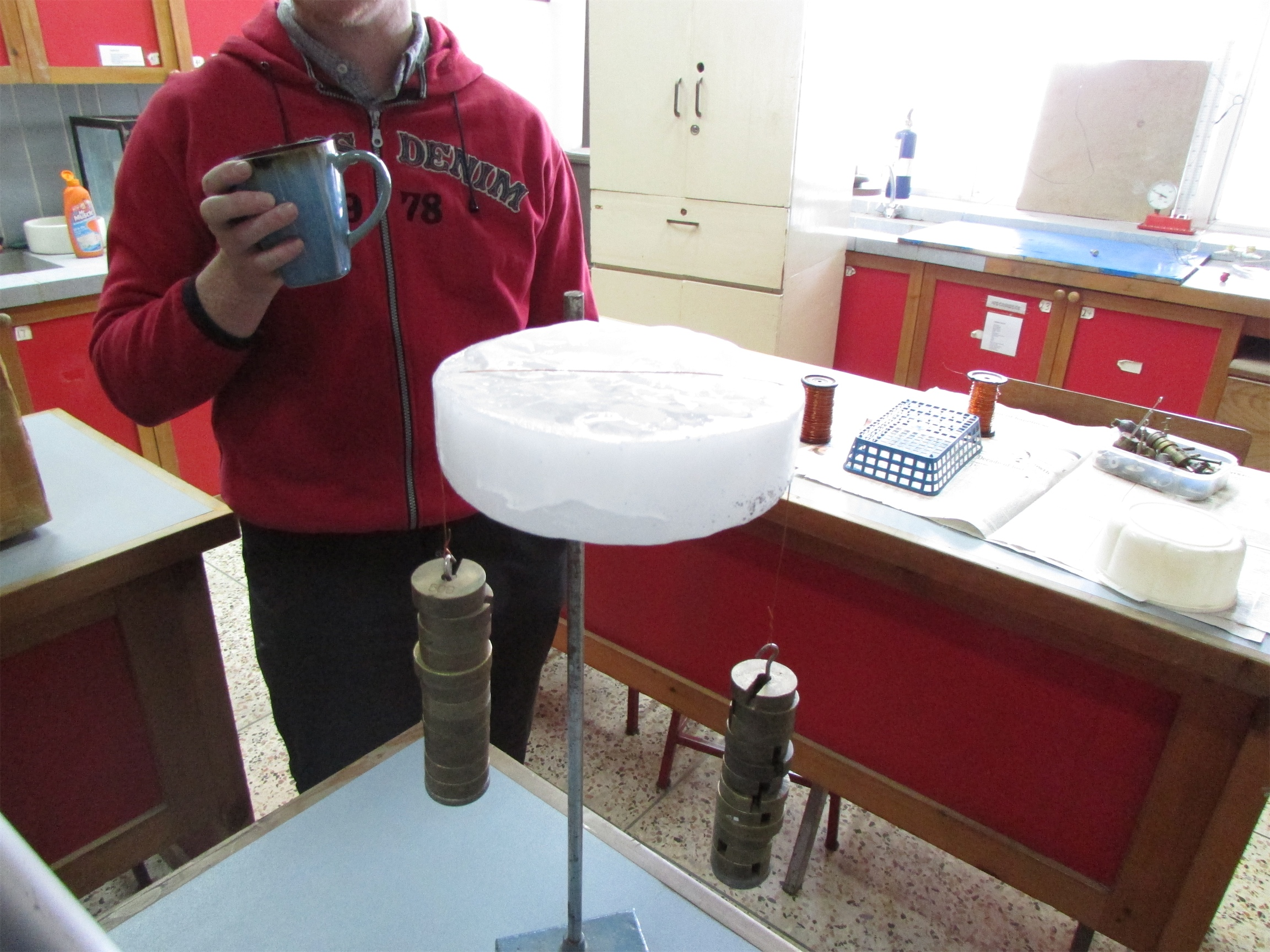
An experiment performed during an MCS Physics class.
