= Consulate General of the United States, Mumbai =

American consulate in Maharashtra, India

Coordinates: 19°03′54″N 72°52′07″E

Consulate General of the United States of America in Mumbai
- युनायटेड स्टेट्स ऑफ अमेरिकाचे महावाणिज्य दूतावास, मुंबई
- Seal of the United States Department of State

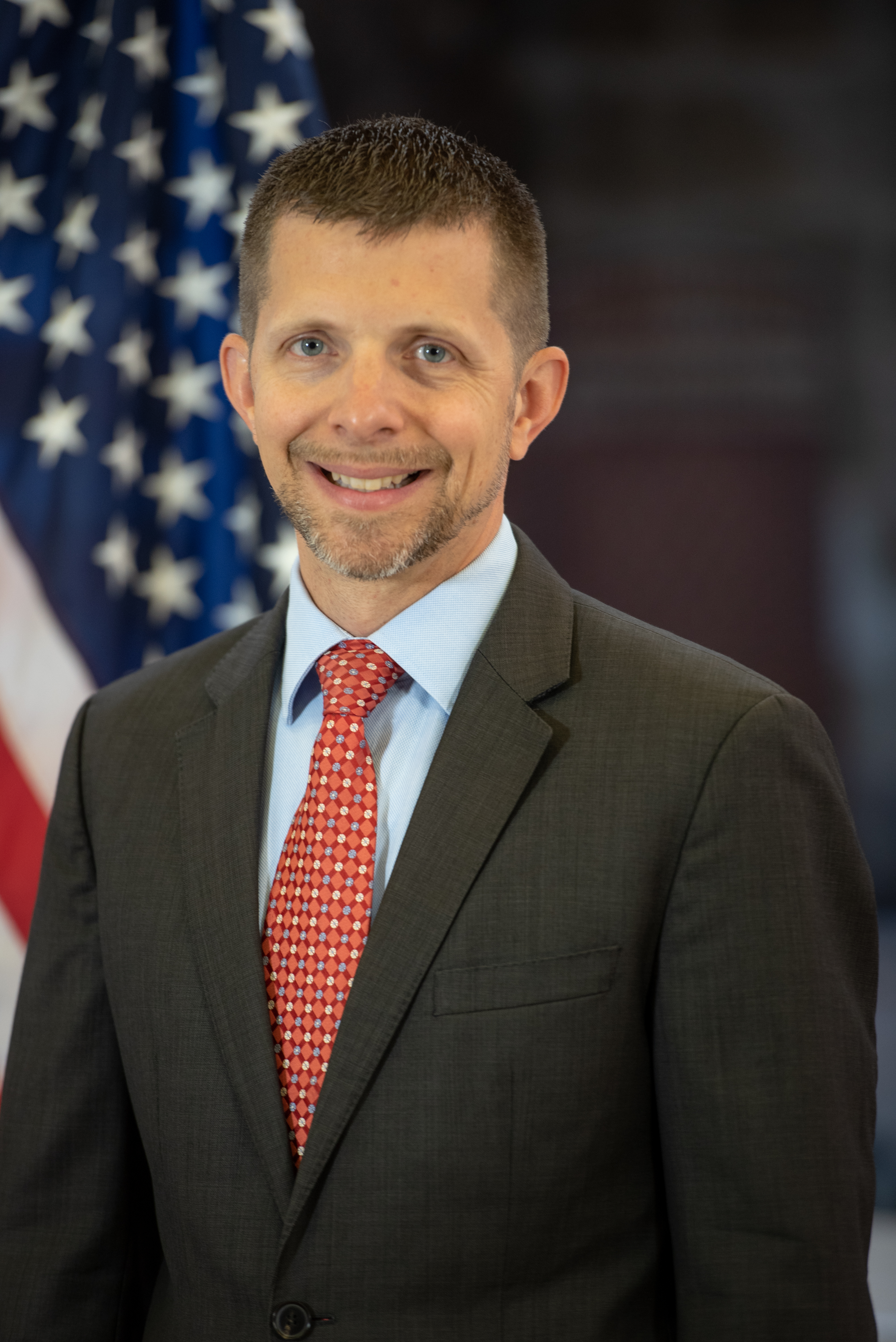
- Incumbent; Mike Hankey since August 08, 2022
- U.S. Department of State
- Style: Consul General
- Nominator: U.S. Ambassador to India
- Term length: NA
- Formation: 1838
- Website: Official website

The Consulate General of the United States of America in Mumbai represents the interests of the U.S. government in Mumbai, India and nearby surrounding areas.

The Consulate General serves the Indian states of Maharashtra, Gujarat, Madhya Pradesh, Chhattisgarh, and Goa.

== Location ==
The Consulate General is located at C-49 G-Block, Bandra-Kurla Complex, Bandra (East).

== History ==
The consulate was established in 1838. In 1843, President Martin Van Buren issued a commission dated 5 October 1838 to Philemon S. Parker, of New York, as consul. At times during the 19th and early 20th centuries, a consular agency at Karachi was under its jurisdiction. Effective 1 July 1945, it was raised to a Consulate General, with Consul General Howard Donovan as the principal officer.

The consulate operated from Wankaner House, later renamed Lincoln House, located at Breach Candy in south Mumbai from 1957. (The consular residence was Washington House on Altamount Road). The building, declared as a heritage site, is an erstwhile palace of Maharaja Wankaner. The palace was handed over to the U.S. consulate by the Maharaja to raise funds to pay off his taxes, after India became independent.

In 2002, the consulate decided to shift its office to northern suburbs owing to security reasons. Since 21 November 2011, all sections of the U.S. Consulate General Mumbai are located at a new facility in Bandra Kurla Complex.

In 2012, the U.S. Commercial Service Trade Information Centre was inaugurated at the Consulate General.

== Sections and offices ==
- Consular section
- Fraud prevention unit
- Public affairs section
- Dosti house
- political/economic section
- U.S. Commercial service
- U.S. Agricultural service
- Study in the U.S.
- Management section
- Regional security office

== See also ==
- Embassy of the United States, New Delhi
- Consulate General of the United States, Kolkata
- Consulate General of the United States, Chennai
- Consulate General of the United States, Hyderabad
