= Consulate General of the United States, Kolkata =

American consulate in West Bengal, India

Consulate General of the United States of America in Kolkata
- মার্কিন যুক্তরাষ্ট্রের কনস্যুলেট জেনারেল, কলকাতা
- Seal of the United States Department of State

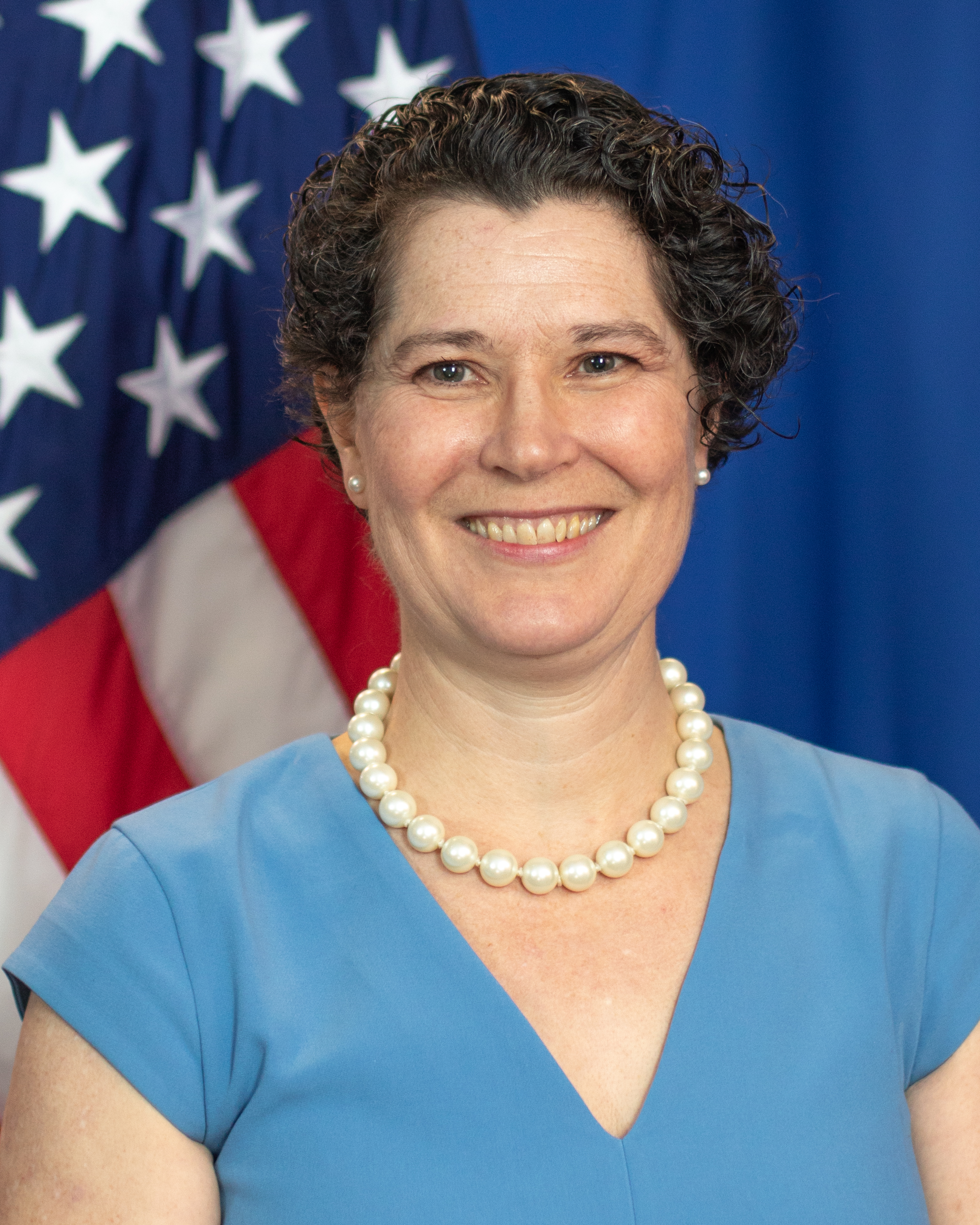
- Incumbent; Kathy Giles-Diaz since August 21, 2024
- U.S. Department of State
- Style: Consul General
- Nominator: President of the United States
- Appointer: H.E. Eric Garcetti
- Inaugural holder: Benjamin Joy as American Consul to India
- Formation: November 19, 1792; 233 years ago
- Website: Official website

The Consulate General of the United States of America in Kolkata represents the interests of the United States government in Kolkata, India and nearby surrounding areas. The Consulate General serves the Indian states of West Bengal, Bihar, Jharkhand, Sikkim, and the seven sister states.

Technically, the consulate reports through the U.S. Embassy in New Delhi. The U.S Consulate in Calcutta is the U.S. Department of State's second oldest consulate in the world and dates from November 19, 1792 as the oldest U.S Consulate of India.

== History ==
The official representation of the U.S. government in India began in November 1792, when the United States's first President, George Washington, nominated Benjamin Joy, of Massachusetts, to be consul. In the 1860s, the Consulate General had under its jurisdiction seven consular agencies: Aden, Akyab, Bassein Chittagong, Cocanada, Moulmein and Rangoon. The Metropolitan Building in Kolkata housed the United States Information Service office till 1991.

During the Vietnam War, the street outside the consulate was renamed after Ho Chi Minh. In 1995, British journalist John F. Burns characterized it as "one of the most beleaguered American diplomatic posts anywhere."

An increase in the number of information technology (IT) companies in India is leading to an expansion of the consulate.

== List of consuls general ==
- Dean R. Thompson (August 2011–August 2015)
- Patti Hoffman (19 August 2015 – 11 August 2021)
- Melinda Pavek (12 August 2021–Incumbent)

== 2002 attack ==
The American Cultural Centre at the consulate was attacked on the morning of 22 January 2002 by Islamic militants. The motorcycle-borne attackers killed 5 people, four of which were Kolkata Police constables and one belonged to a private security agency. Two groups claimed responsibility for the attack. A Harkat-ul-Jihad al-Islami member, Farhan Malik, claimed responsibility and said the attack was in protest against "the evil empire of America", while another person claiming to be a member of Asif Raza Commandos, a gang with ties to radical Islamic groups, also claimed responsibility.

== See also ==
- Embassy of the United States, New Delhi
- Consulate General of the United States, Mumbai
- Consulate General of the United States, Chennai
- Consulate General of the United States, Hyderabad
