= American Library (New Delhi) =

- Interactive map of the American Library (New Delhi) area
- Former names: American Information Resource Center

General information
- Location: 24 K.G. Marg, New Delhi, India
- Coordinates: 28.628970°N 77.222450°E
- Construction started: 1946
- Owner: U.S. Embassy in New Delhi

Website
- http://newdelhi.usembassy.gov/americanlibrary.html

The American Library in New Delhi is a library under the supervision of the United States embassy, situated in the commercial hub of New Delhi inside the American Center (the office of US government officials in India). Opened in 1951, the Library was established to promote understanding between the people of India and the United States. The library has books on topics related to American society, American politics, American culture, and the American constitution which it serves to general public, students, teachers, and researchers.

== History ==
The library started as a reading room on 54 Queensway (now Janpath) under the banner of the "United States Library" with a collection of 3,000 books, 2,000 pamphlets, and 80 periodical subscriptions, and a seating capacity of 24. In 1951, when the book collection reached 6,000, a lending system was introduced and free membership was extended. Two years later, loan services by mail were offered to those living outside the capital. The library moved to 24 Curzon Road (now Kasturba Gandhi Marg) in 1952 with a collection of 10,000 books and 300 periodical subscriptions. The library occupied temporary quarters at Bahawalpur House on 1, Sikandra Road from 1969 until February 1974. The library celebrated its 25 years of service to the Indian public in November 1971. The silver Jubilee celebrations were presided over by the Vice President of India, the late Dr.Gopal Swarup Pathak.

The library returned to its permanent house at 24 Kasturba Gandhi Marg, where a new building was constructed, in February 1947 and it was formally inaugurated by Mr. C. Subramanian, then the Minister of the Government of India.

On 7 January 1982, the American Library celebrated its thirty-fifth anniversary with Dr. Chanranjit Chanana, then the union Minister of State for industry, steel, mines of the Government of India as a chief guest. The Minister lauded the services provided by the library, cited it as a model for Indian librarians, and offered suggestions for additional services.

Similar libraries have also been built in Mumbai, Chennai and Calcutta. Calcutta has the oldest of them, which was started in 1943. Chennai's library opened in 1947 as part of the U.S. Consulate at Dare House, with a collection of just 800 books.

American Ambassador Chester Bowles called it the "highest point in the deep friendship and close relation between India and U.S."

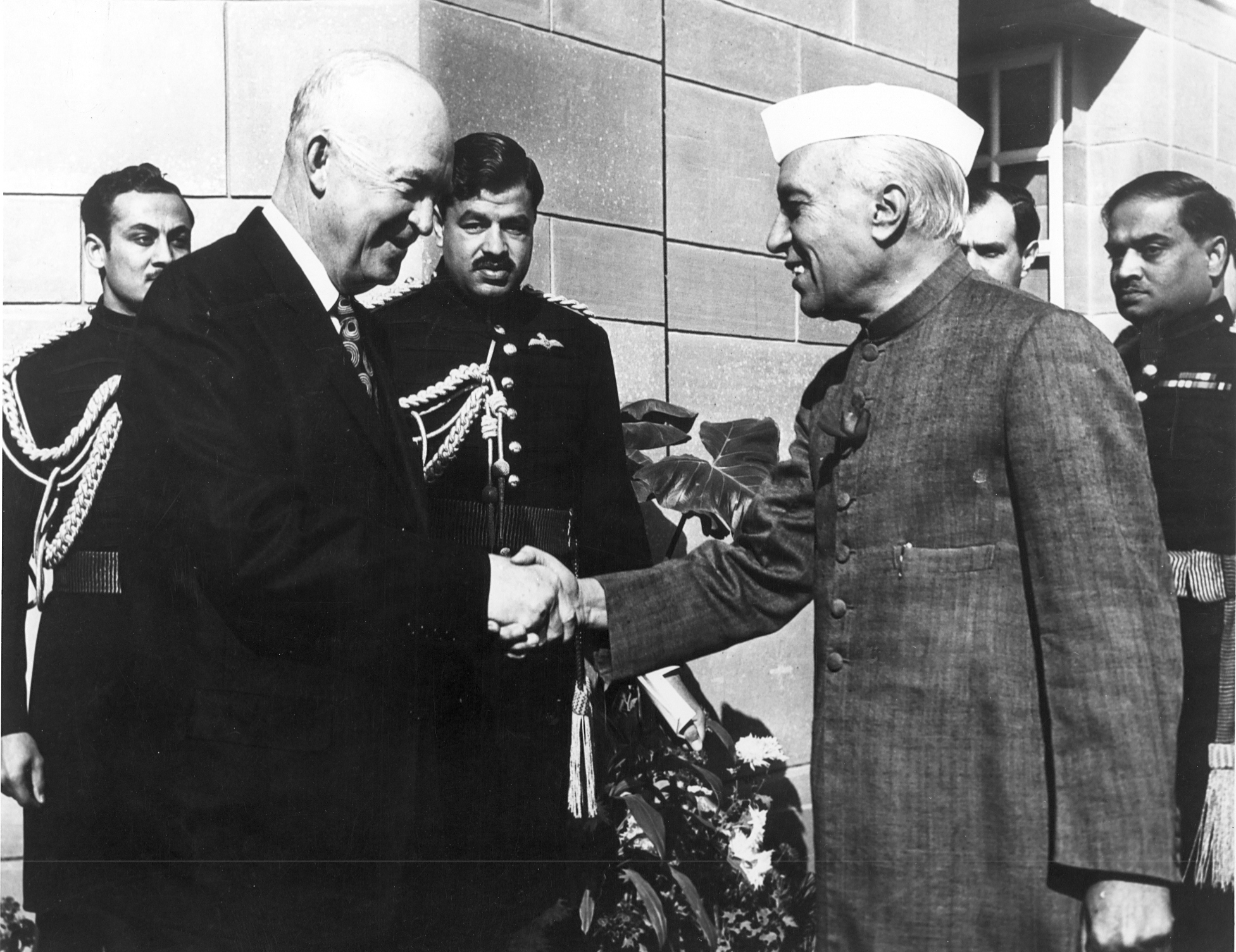
Photograph of Nehru and Eisenhower, from the Indo-US Archives

== Indo-US relationship ==
The American Library is a symbol of friendship between India and the United States. The United States was the first country to exchange Ambassadors with modern India. The first diplomatic organization of the U.S. government to be set up in New Delhi was the office of the Personal Representative of the President in Cochin House in 1941. The office moved into Bahawalpur house in 1943. After India won independence in 1947, a full-fledged American Embassy was established at Bahawalpur House. The Embassy moved to Chanakyapuri in 1959, US Ambassador Timothy J. Roemer's wife remarked during a ceremony of presenting 1000 books to ten schools in New Delhi, that books are symbol of friendship between the current First Lady of the United States, Michelle Obama, and Indian Prime Minister's wife Mrs. Gursharan Kaur.

== Sponsor ==
The New Delhi-based Library and Book Office (LBO), now the Information Resource Office (IRO) is under supervision of the American Library and Book Office which provides the overall library program guidance as well as logistical support to the American center Libraries in Mumbai, Kolkata, Chennai, and New Delhi. Their services include:

- Providing policy direction for selecting library materials
- Providing centralized acquisitions and technical processing of all prints and non print library materials which includes the ordering, receipt, processing and distribution of new materials in shelf-ready condition;
- Maintaining a computerized union catalog of all-India library holdings; and many more.

The office is under the Information Resource Officer, who oversees the library budget, facilities, working in India, Bangladesh and Nepal.

== Features and facts ==
During the more than 60 years the American Library establishment has been in operation, it has served more than 350 million people and the fully automated American Library branch in New Delhi offers a rapid information retrieval and online and CD-ROM databases with access to approximately 10,000 full text journals. It also offers 16,000 books and 150 print periodicals on a variety of subjects including law, trade, management and American literature. Its collection of DVDs includes movies, data, and software which is available for circulation. The library offers an online catalog database to assist patrons in locating library materials.

The American Library plans commemorative events on the topics including American society, culture, and the latest books describing American society. Given the high premium the United States and India place on information technology, the library has an information system in place to help members gather the data they need, on a variety of subjects related to life and culture in the United States.

At any given moment, about half of the American Library's 70,000 books can be found in the homes of over 76,000 registered patrons. The American Library provides outreach introducing its facilities to young people from disadvantaged background. The library staff regularly visits schools and universities to expand its information network. The American Center has introduced a bi-monthly book post which includes the upcoming events and all updates about the center.

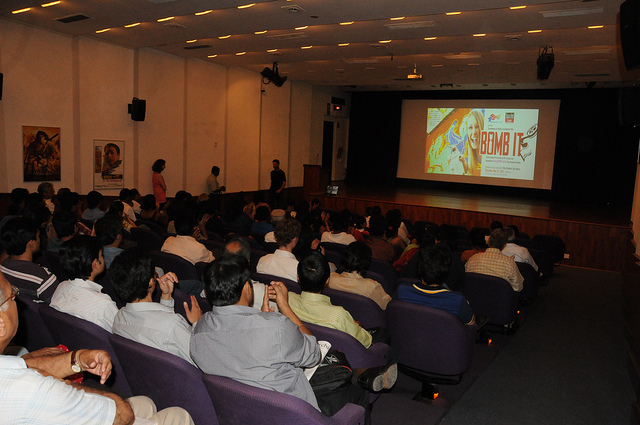
Friday Flickr movie in the Audi in American Center

== Events ==
The American Center and American Library New Delhi together hold a number of cultural events, and every week the center organizes events or important discussions which are related to American society and current happenings. One of the most popular is Friday Flicks, where the center presents a Hollywood movie for the public and members of library in its Auditorium. Usually there is a monthly theme around which the movies are screened.
