= Consulate General of the United States, Hyderabad =

American consulate in Telangana, India

Consulate General of the United States of America in Hyderabad
- Seal of the United States Department of State

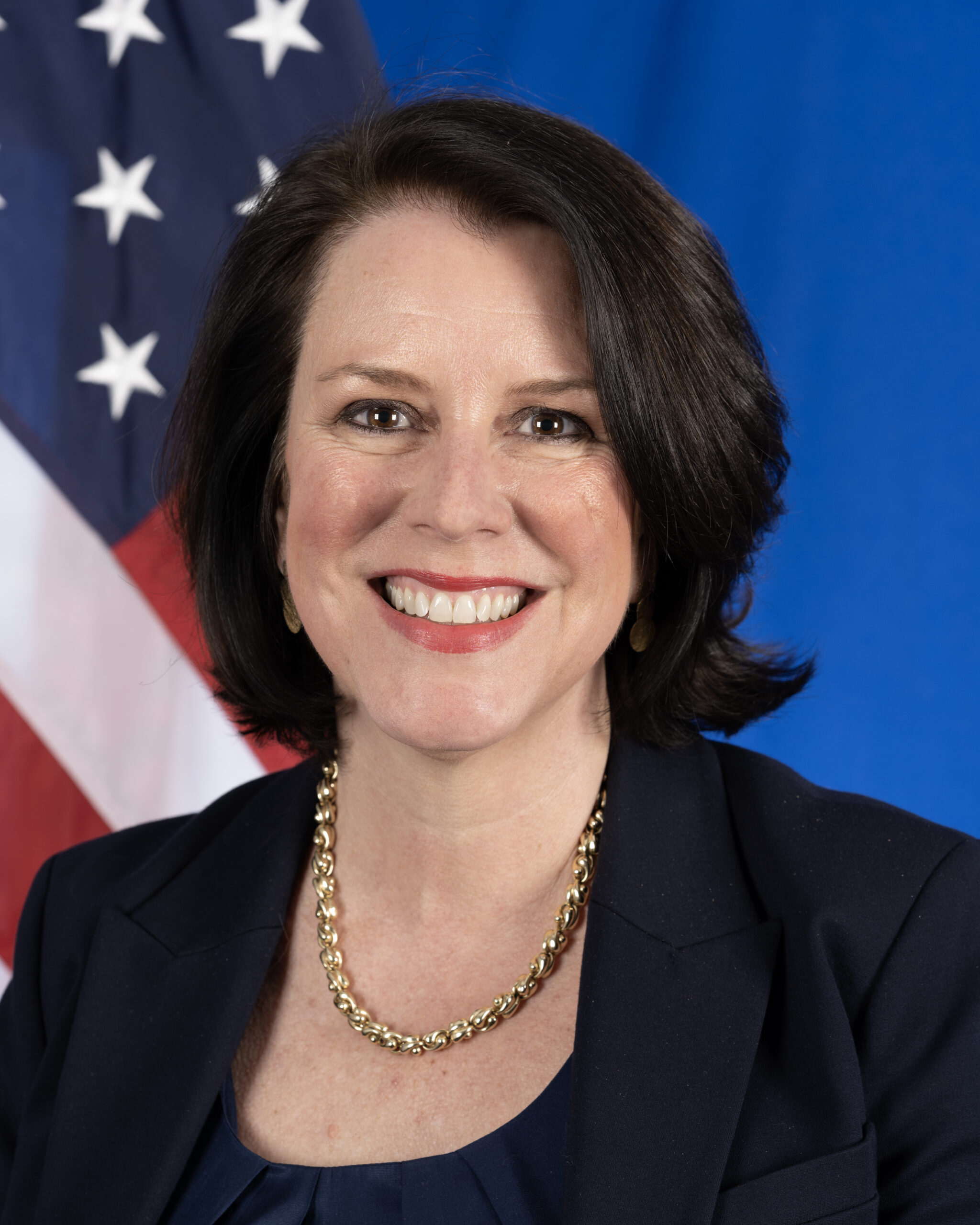
- Incumbent; Laura Williams since 8 August 2025
- United States Department of State
- Style: Consul General
- Nominator: Donald Trump
- Formation: 24 October 2008; 18 years ago
- Website: Official website

The Consulate General of the United States of America in Hyderabad represents the interests of the U.S. government in Hyderabad, India and nearby surrounding areas. The Consulate General serves the Indian states of Telangana, Andhra Pradesh, and Odisha. The current Consul General is Jennifer Larson, incumbent since September 2022.

Established in 2008, it is the first U.S. diplomatic office to open in India since India's independence. The United States Consulate General in Hyderabad announced the opening of its new owned facility in Financial District to cater to the regional needs for the next 20 years. At a cost of $340 million, new consulate facility in Hyderabad is an investment in the India–US relationship.

== History ==
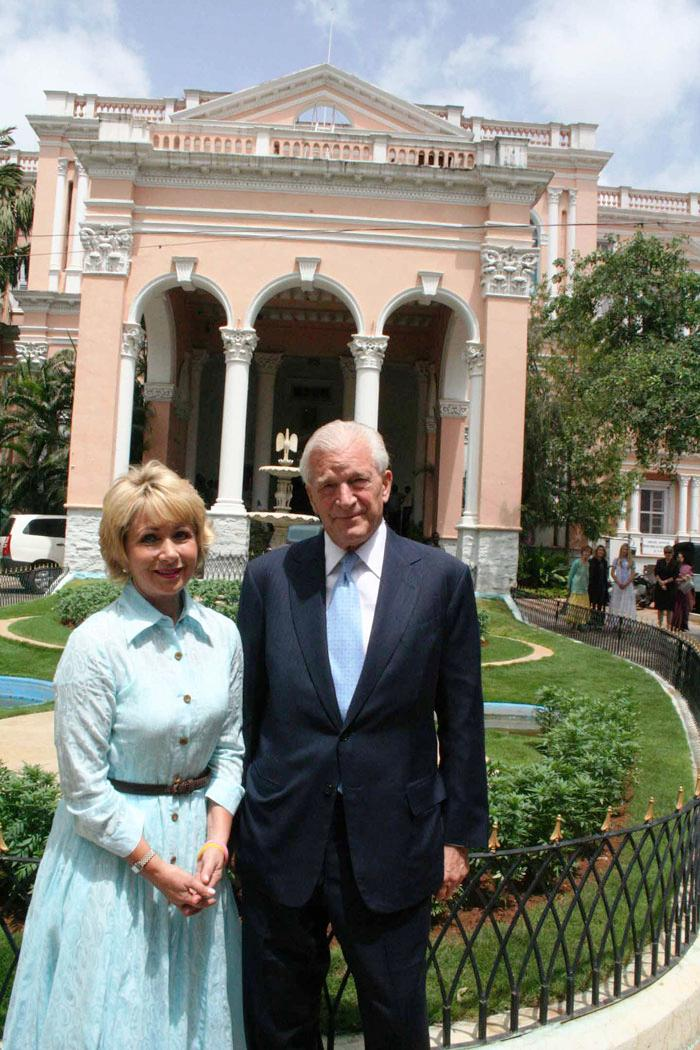
U.S. Ambassador to India David C. Mulford during the inauguration of the consulate

Until the consulate opened in Hyderabad, the Consulate General of the United States, Chennai received about 40% of its visa applications from Andhra Pradesh. In early 2006, the then Chief Minister of the State Y. S. Rajasekhara Reddy announced that the United States government has agreed to open a consulate in the capital city of Hyderabad. He also announced steps to provide temporary and permanent accommodation to the consular staff. This announcement came soon after the visit of President of the United States George W. Bush to the state capital. Hyderabad was chosen because of "its strategic location in terms of a large visa demand, a broad-based economy spanning information technology, bio-technology and other life sciences besides a diverse population, including Muslims." Soon after this, the then United States Ambassador to India David Campbell Mulford announced that the consulate will begin its operations in 2007 and inauguration planned for 2008. The purpose of opening the consulate in Hyderabad was to reduce the burden of the consulate in Chennai that issues the highest number of visas in India.

In 2007, United States signed an agreement with the local government to lease the Paigah Palace for five years. Mulford announced that the palace will be renovated to serve as a temporary accommodation for the consulate. The state government designated 12 acres (0.049 km^{2}) in the city's Financial District where a permanent consulate would be built, and is expected to be ready for use in Mid-2022.

In 2008, the facility opened with the capacity to process 100 visa applications in a day. The consulate first started interviewing visa applicants from 10 March 2009 and in a year's time it interviewed 100,000 applicants. In the years following its opening, the number of students traveling to the United States from Telangana and Andhra Pradesh increased significantly.

US consulate in Hyderabad opened its own new building built in Nanakramguda, Financial District on 20 March 2023. Spread across a sprawling 12.3-acre site and built at a cost of US$ 340 million, the facility is among the largest US consular processing campus in Asia, both in terms of the number of visa windows and in area.

== Activities ==
The consulate has conducted activities that foster and promote education in the United States, Indo-US business ties and social causes such as renovation of a two-centuries-old tomb of Mah Laqa Bai, a Nizam-era Urdu poet and courtesan.

== See also ==
- Embassy of the United States, New Delhi
- Consulate General of the United States, Kolkata
- Consulate General of the United States, Chennai
- Consulate General of the United States, Mumbai
