= Charhan =

Coordinates: 33°49′0″N 73°28′0″E

Charihan
- Union Council
- Interactive map of Charihan
- Country: Pakistan
- Province: Punjab
- District: Murree
- Tehsil: Murree

Population
  - Total: 11,792

Charihan is a village and union council of Murree Tehsil in the Murree District of Punjab, Pakistan. It is located in the east of the tehsil at 33°49'0N 73°28'0E and is bounded to the north by Mussiari, to the north by Ghel, to the north-west by Murree city, to the west by Mussiari, to the south by Ban and to the south and east by Kotli Sattian.

Gulehra Gali is the main market place of Charhan UC. It is also the starting point of the Patriata Chair Lift. There are parks, restaurants, markets, schools and health centers.

According to the 1998 census of Pakistan it had a population of 11,414.
