= PP-6 Murree =

Constituency of the Punjabi Provincial Legislature, Pakistan

- Constituency for the Provincial Assembly of Punjab
- Region: Murree District

Current constituency
- Created from: PP-1 Rawalpindi-I (2002-2018); PP-6 Rawalpindi-I (2018-2023)

PP-6 Murree (پی پی-6، مری) is a Constituency of Provincial Assembly of Punjab.

== Area ==
- Murree Tehsil
- Kotli Sattian Tehsil
- Murree City District
- Aliot Bazar
- Phagwari Bazar

== 1985—1988:PP-1 Rawalpindi-I ==
1985 Pakistani general election was held on 25 February 1985 in Pakistan. This election was nonpartisan basis election, around 1300 candidates contested the elections. Chaudhary Nawaz ul Haq Chuhan was elected from PP-1 (Rawalpindi-I) by defeating Doctor Muhammad Afzal Ejaz.

Contesting candidates	Votes polled
Chaudhary Nawaz ul Haq Chuhan	9769
Doctor Muhammad Afzal Ejaz	9447
Raja Abdul Majeed Abbasi	8794
Muhammad Mahmood Akbar Kiyani	6238
Muhammad Anwar Abbasi	3990
Chaudhary Muhammad Razzaq	1957
Turnout	40195

== 2008—2013: PP-1 Rawalpindi-I ==
Provincial election 2008: PP-1 Rawalpindi-I
Party	Candidate	Votes	%	±%
PML(N)	Raja Fiaz Sarwar	40,517	39.74	
PPP	Raja Muhammad Shafqat Khan	32,965	32.33	
PML(Q)	Sardar Muhammad Sajid Khan	25,218	24.73	
MMA	Sohail Irfan Abbasi	1,450	1.42	
Independent	Muhammad Safarish Abbassi	1,019	1.00	
Independent	Mst. Sumaira Satti	560	0.55	
Independent	Sardar Muhammad Mansoor Saleem	229	0.22	
Turnout		104,679	47.78	
Total valid votes		101,958	97.40	
Rejected ballots		2,721	2.60	
Majority		7,552	7.41	
Registered electors		219,078		

== 2013—2018: PP-1 Rawalpindi-I ==
General elections were held on 11 May 2013. Raja Ashfaq Sarwar won this seat with 50982 votes.

Provincial election 2013: PP-1 Rawalpindi-I
Party	Candidate	Votes	%	±%
PML(N)	Raja Ashfaq Sarwar	50,982	38.66	
PML(Q)	Sardar Muhammad Saleem Khan	23,364	17.72	
PTI	Javed Iqbal Satti	21,435	16.25	
MDM	Muhammad Ishtiaq Abbasi	13,579	10.30	
Independent	Raja Shehzad Nemat Satti	7,926	6.01	
Independent	Shakeel Ahmed	6,900	5.23	
JI	Sajjad Ahmed Abbasi	6,201	4.70	
Others	Others (eight candidates)	1,490	1.13	
Turnout		136,616	59.90	
Total valid votes		131,877	96.53	
Rejected ballots		4,739	3.47	
Majority		27,618	20.94	
Registered electors		228,077		

== 2018—2023: PP-6 Rawalpindi-I ==
General elections are scheduled to be held on 25 July 2018. In 2018 Pakistani general election, Muhammad Latasab Satti a ticket holder of PTI won PP-6 Rawalpindi I election by taking 64,642 votes.

Provincial election 2018: PP-6 Rawalpindi-I
Party	Candidate	Votes	%	±%
PTI	Muhammad Latasab Satti	64,642	42.03	
PML(N)	Raja Ashfaq Sarwar	56,772	36.91	
MMA	Sajjad Abbasi	9,946	6.47	
TLP	Nayyar Munir	9,507	6.18	
PPP	Sajjad Anmed Abbasi	8,428	5.48	
Independent	Faisal Mehmood Satti	1,702	4.11	
Others	Others (seven candidates)	3,530	1.82	
Turnout		157,977	57.54	
Total valid votes		154,527	97.82	
Rejected ballots		3,450	2.18	
Majority		7,870	5.12	
Registered electors		274,532		

== General elections 2024 ==
Provincial election 2024: PP-6 Murree
Party	Candidate	Votes	%	±%
PML(N)	Muhammad Bilal Yamin	66,049	40.77	
PTI	Zain UI Abideen (Note: Filed nomination papers as PTI candidate but ECP allowed him to run as an PTI)	33,847	20.89	
JI	Muhammad Sufyan	20,765	12.82	
TLP	Mumtaz Ali	13,573	8.38	
PRHP	Nasir Mehmood Abbasi	11,695	7.22	
PPP	Muhammad Nazir Abbasi	6,077	3.75	
Independent	Syed Aamir Abbas Shah Kazmi	5,192	3.21	
Others	Others (twenty five candidates)	4,795	2.96	
Turnout		166,262	56.33	
Total valid votes		161,993	97.43	
Rejected ballots		4,269	2.57	
Majority		32,202	19.88	
Registered electors		295,163		
hold				

== See also ==
- NA-51 Murree-cum-Rawalpindi
- PP-5 Attock-V
- PP-7 Rawalpindi-I
