= Phagwari =

Phagwari Murree
- Union council
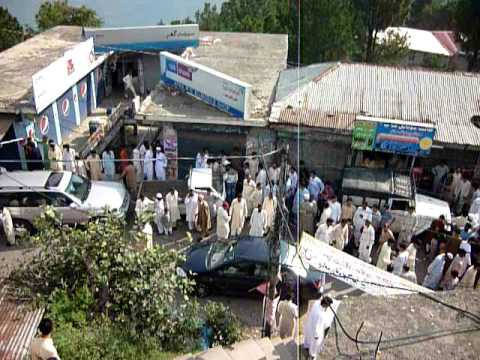

- Location within Pakistan
- Coordinates: 33°57′0″N 73°21′7″E
- Country: Pakistan
- Province: Punjab
- District: Murree
- Tehsil: Murree

Government
  - Chairman: Khaleel Abbasi (PML-N)
  - V-Chairman: Nambardar Ittefaq Abbasi (PML-N)

Population (1998)
  - Total: 13,060

Phagwari (پھگواڑ ی) is a village and union council of Murree Tehsil in the Murree District of Punjab, Pakistan. It is located at 33°58'60N 73°30'0E in the north-west of the tehsil. It is bounded to the north by Dewal, to the west by Rawat, to the south by Potha Sharif and to the east by Kashmir. According to the 1998 census of Pakistan, it had a population of 13,060.
