= Potha Sharif =

Coordinates: 33°57′0″N 73°30′0″E

Potha Sharif Aliot
- Union council
- Interactive map of Potha Sharif
- Country: Pakistan
- Province: Punjab
- District: Murree
- Tehsil: Murree

Population
  - Total: 15,890

Potha Sharif (پوٹھہ شریف) is a village and union council of Murree Tehsil in the Murree District of Punjab, Pakistan. It is located in the north-east of the tehsil at 33°57'0N 73°30'0E, and is bounded to the north by Phagwari, to the south by Sehr Bagla, to the west by Rawat and to the east by Kashmir. The village contains the mazar of the Sufi saint Hazarat Dada Malik Suraj Abbasi, forefather of the Potha Shareef people. He had seven sons and their descendants are currently present in Potha Shareef. People visit the mazar from different areas of the country to offer tribute.

The hub of the UC Potha Sharif is Aliot (علیوٹ) located on the Lower Topa - Kohala (AJK) GT Road. It has a big main market with nearly 500 shops.

== Market ==
The main market of Aliot has many attractions and services. Available facilities are:

- Private free dispensary founded and aided by Raja Shahid Abbasi. Private hospitals and clinics, optical, dentist, physicians, X-ray clinic, spiritual healer, pharmacy.
- Photo studio, photocopier, scanner, stationary
- Mobile shops and repairing, computer repairing, electrician
- Gold and jewellery
- Shoes, garments, cloth, tailoring, cosmetics, crockery, barber, pallar
- Vegetables, fruits, bakeries, grocery, poultry, boucher
- Restaurants, marriage hall, catering
- Auto technician, petrol, diesel, carpenter, cylinder gas refilling, steel fixer, electronics, furniture, sanitary, blacksmith, hardware shops, Bank ATM

== Caste and language ==
95% ofthe population belongs to Abbasid family. The Abbasid dynasty descended from Muhammad's uncle, Al-Abbas ibn Abd al-Muttalib. The primary spoken language is Pahari (Hindko), and Urdu is spoken as secondary language. In schools, English and Urdu are taught.

== Educational institutions ==
The village has many government and private sector schools but standards are low, especially in government sector. Most of the richest families migrated to Rawalpindi and Islamabad city for a better quality of life for their families. Hanif Abbasi founded "Malik Suraj Higher Secondary School Potha Sharif Murree" in 1992. It was a first step towards quality education, and provided easy access to female education in Potha Sharif. Abbasi was a Pakistani philanthropist, social activist, ascetic, and humanitarian. Thousands of students graduated from this institute.

One of the private sector schools, Iqra School, was founded by Muhammad Shabaz Abbasi, Noorulislam Abbasi, Muhammad Almas Abbasi, Muhammad Naseem Abbasi, and Sufyan Abbasi in Churian (چوریاں) Town. Later the name was changed to Read Foundation School because of sponsorship by a foreign non-profit educational network (NGO) known as Read Foundation, which runs a network of 344 schools in eight districts of Pakistan. It is governed under the supervision of Jamaat-e-Islami representatives with the contribution of Read Foundation. Madni public school in Sehanna has also been in operation since 1995. Institutions in the village include:

- Malik Suraj Higher Secondary School (Potha)
- Read Foundation School (Potha)
- Read Foundation College (Aliot)
- Govt Boys High School (Potha)
- Govt Girls High School (Upper Aliot)
- Govt Vocational Training Centre for Women (Aliot)
- Mahawiya School of Islamic studies (Aliot)
- Madni Public School (Sihanna)

== Religion & spiritual schools ==
The area is populated by Sunni Muslims. Prominent Mosques includes Jamia Masjid Faridia (upper Aliot), Jamia Masjid Ayesha Sadeeq (main Aliot).

Qari Irfan Abbasi is one of the leading masters in Aliot spreading religious education since 1965. Seminaries in the area include:

- Masjid Usman Ghani (Jabra Aliot)
- Jamia Faridia (Upper Aliot)
- Jamia Masjid Ayesha Sadeeq (Aliot)
- Abdullah Ibn-e-abbas (Dara دڑہ)
- Masjid Abdullah Khan Potha Sharif
- Jamia Masjid Abu Baker Sadeeq (Sihanna)

== Population ==
According to the 2017 census of Pakistan, it had a population of 15,890.
