= Sumbal Bia =

Pakistani town

- Village
- Country: Pakistan
- Province: Punjab
- District: Rawalpindi
- Tehsil: Murree

Population
  - Total: 2,000

Sumbal Bia (Punjabi, Urdu: سنبل بیا is a town in Mussiari, situated within the Murree Tehsil of the Rawalpindi District in Punjab (Pakistan). Located in the southwestern part of the tehsil, it is bordered by Jhika Gali to the north, Angoori, Murree to the south, Numbal to the west, and the Murree Expressway (N-75) to the east. In 2008, the town had a population of approximately 2,000.

== Professions and occupations ==
The majority of people work in the government service sector. The rest of them run manage households, run businesses such as shopkeeping, general stores, tattoo artists and poultry farming. In the past people cultivated crops on their land, but due to unavailability of resources this occupation is left out. The common professions and occupations are:

- Armed forces service
- Teaching
- Work abroad
- Contractor

== Education ==
There are three primary schools

- GBPS Sumbal Bia

== Demographics ==
The majority of the inhabitants of Sumbal Bia are the Abbasi. Other tribes such as the Malik Awan, Qureshi, Mughal and Rajput (Khakha) inhabit the area in smaller proportions.

== Facilities ==
Sumbal Bia is home to predominantly poor inhabitants. The area has not been economically prosperous due to lack of infrastructure such as regular water supply, safe roads and higher education establishments. Basic services that are available include:

- Taxi
- Food market
- Cricket ground

== Mosques ==
There are three mosques in Sumbal Bia:

- Jamia Masjid Al-Habib Sumbal Bia
- Anwar e Madina Masjid Lower Sumbal Bia
- Upper Sumbal Bia Masjid Hotrairi

== Transport ==
- Suzuki Carry is available from Sain and Gohra to Lower Topa and taxis (for local travel)
- Buses and vans connect Rawalpindi/Islamabad
