= Phaphril =

- Village
- Country: Pakistan
- Province: Punjab
- District: Murree
- Tehsil: Murree

Government
  - Nazim: Raja Amjad Mehmood Abbasi (2005-10)
  - Chairman: Raja Razzaq Khan (1998)
  - Counsilrs: Raja Aurangzaib (2002) M. Fayyaz Qureshi (2005-10) Raees Abbasi (2005-10)

Population
  - Total: 2,700

Phaphril is a village of Murree Tehsil in the Murree District of Punjab, Pakistan.

== Geography ==
It is located in the south-east of the Murree Tehsil and is bounded to the north by Jhika Gali, to the south by Angoori, Murree, to the west by Numbal and to the east by Murree Expressway - N75. The village is home to Sozo Adventure Park.

== Demographics ==
It had a population of 2700.

== Schools and education ==
The villages hosts three government schools and two private schools:

- Govt Higher Secondary School Phaphril
- Govt Girls Elementary School Phaphril
- Govt Boys Primary School Sohawa Phaphril
- Swan Valley Secondary School Phaphril
- Iqra Residential School & College Phaphril
- Mphaphuli High school

The majority of the inhabitants are Abbasi. Other tribes such as the Qureshi, Mughal, Awan and Rajput (Khakha) inhabit the area in smaller numbers.

== Facilities ==
Basic services and facilities include:

- Basic Health Unit Phaphril
- Post Office Phaphril
- Women Skill Center (Dastkari)
- Dar Ul Hikmat Clinic (Mumtaz & Sons) Phaphril
- Taxi Hire
- Fruit Market & Grocery Stores, Bakery
- Jamia Mosque
- Cricket Ground

== Mosques and madrasa ==
Phaphil has three mosques:

- Madrasa Kullia Tul Ghausia Lil Binat Phaphril
- Jamia Masjid Quba Ghausia Nooriya Phaphril
- Madni Masjid Sohawa Phaphril
- Anwar e Habib Masjid Pandi, lower Phaphril

== Transport ==
- Suzuki Carry - jeeps are common from Sain and Gohra to Lower Topa and Taxis
- Buses and Toyota vans travel to Rawalpindi/Islamabad
