= List of hill stations in Pakistan =

There are many hill stations in Pakistan, where there is snow in the winter. In the summer, the temperatures are much cooler than the hot areas of Punjab and Sindh. People from all over the country flock to these hill stations to enjoy the snow in winters, and to enjoy the cool summers away from the hot plains. The following is a list of hill stations:

== List ==
Name	District	Province
Abbottabad	Abbottabad_District	Khyber Pakhtunkhwa
Ayubia	Abbottabad District	Khyber Pakhtunkhwa
Behrain	Swat District	Khyber Pakhtunkhwa
Bhurban	Murree District	Punjab
Chitral	Chitral District	Khyber Pakhtunkhwa
Fort Munro	Dera Ghazi Khan District	Punjab
Galyat	Abbottabad District / Murree District	Khyber Pakhtunkhwa / Punjab
Gilgit	Gilgit District	Gilgit–Baltistan
Gorakh Hill	Dadu District	Sindh
Hunza	Hunza District	Gilgit–Baltistan
Kaghan Valley	Mansehra District	Khyber Pakhtunkhwa
Kalam Valley	Swat District	Khyber Pakhtunkhwa
Laram Top	Lower Dir District	Khyber Pakhtunkhwa
Malam Jabba	Swat District	Khyber Pakhtunkhwa
Murree	Murree District	Punjab
Muzaffarabad	Muzaffarabad District	Azad Kashmir
Neelum Valley	Azad Kashmir	Azad Kashmir
Patriata	Murree District	Punjab
Samana	Hangu District	Khyber Pakhtunkhwa
Skardu	Skardu District	Gilgit–Baltistan
Shogran	Mansehra District	Khyber Pakhtunkhwa
Thandiani	Abbottabad District	Khyber Pakhtunkhwa
Toli Pir	Poonch District	Azad Kashmir
Ziarat	Ziarat District	Balochistan

== See also ==
- Tourism in Pakistan
- Geography of Pakistan
