= Mussiari =

Musyari
- Union council
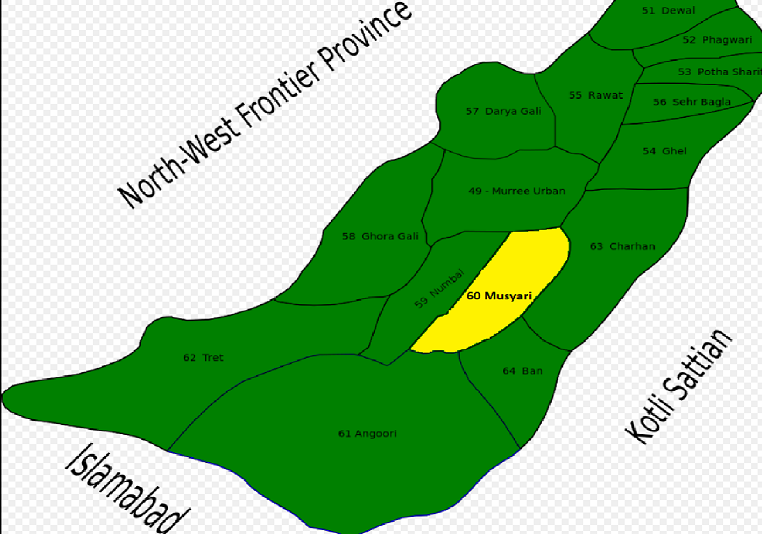
- Musyari is located in the south of Tehsil Murree
- Country: Pakistan
- Province: Punjab
- District: Murree
- Tehsil: Murree

Government
  - Chairman: Imtiaz Abbasi (2015-2020)
  - Nazim: Haji Irshad Abbasi (2005-2010)
  - Naib Nazim: Amjad Mehmood Abbasi (2005-2010)
  - Nazim: Hafeez
  - Naib Nazim: Zahid Abbasi

Population
  - Total: 16,000

Musyari, also known as Mussiari (Punjabi, Urdu: مسیاڑی) is a village and union council of Murree Tehsil in the Murree District of Punjab, Pakistan.

It is located in the south-central area of the tehsil to the south of Murree. According to the 1998 census of Pakistan, it had a population of 9,945.

The major tribes of the Union Council include the (Dhund Abbasis) Behramals and the Parhals with such distribution that the village Musyari which located in the south of Murree city houses the brave Parhals along with the villages of Mohra, Batnara and Pangan (in south of Jhika Gali), while the villages of Bara Hoter, Sumbal Bia, Phaphril, Ghora and Saen are inhabited by Behramals. The river Soan bisects the two population hubs. There are Behramal majority areas in the east of the river and Parhal majority areas in the west.

The literacy rate in Union Council Musyari is substantial, and the rate is relatively healthy for girls, too. One high school for boys, located in the village of Phaphirl, is meeting the education needs of the populace, but it does not suffice. The growing population of the area demands a higher secondary school, and the existing School needs to be upgraded for this purpose. There are several middle and primary schools for boys and girls in the area, but a girls high school is still a remote possibility that eludes the desirous population for decades. The affluent parents prefer sending their children to better English-medium schools in Murree City. The road network has substantially increased with the construction of the Murree-Islamabad expressway. However, remote areas still suffer from dilapidated road conditions that become aggravated each year due to flashing monsoons.

== Famous personalities ==
- Kashif Abbasi, journalist
- Muztar Abbasi, scholar and author
- Mohammad Wasim, cricketer
