= Bhurban =

Coordinates: 33.9557°N 73.4518°E

- Town
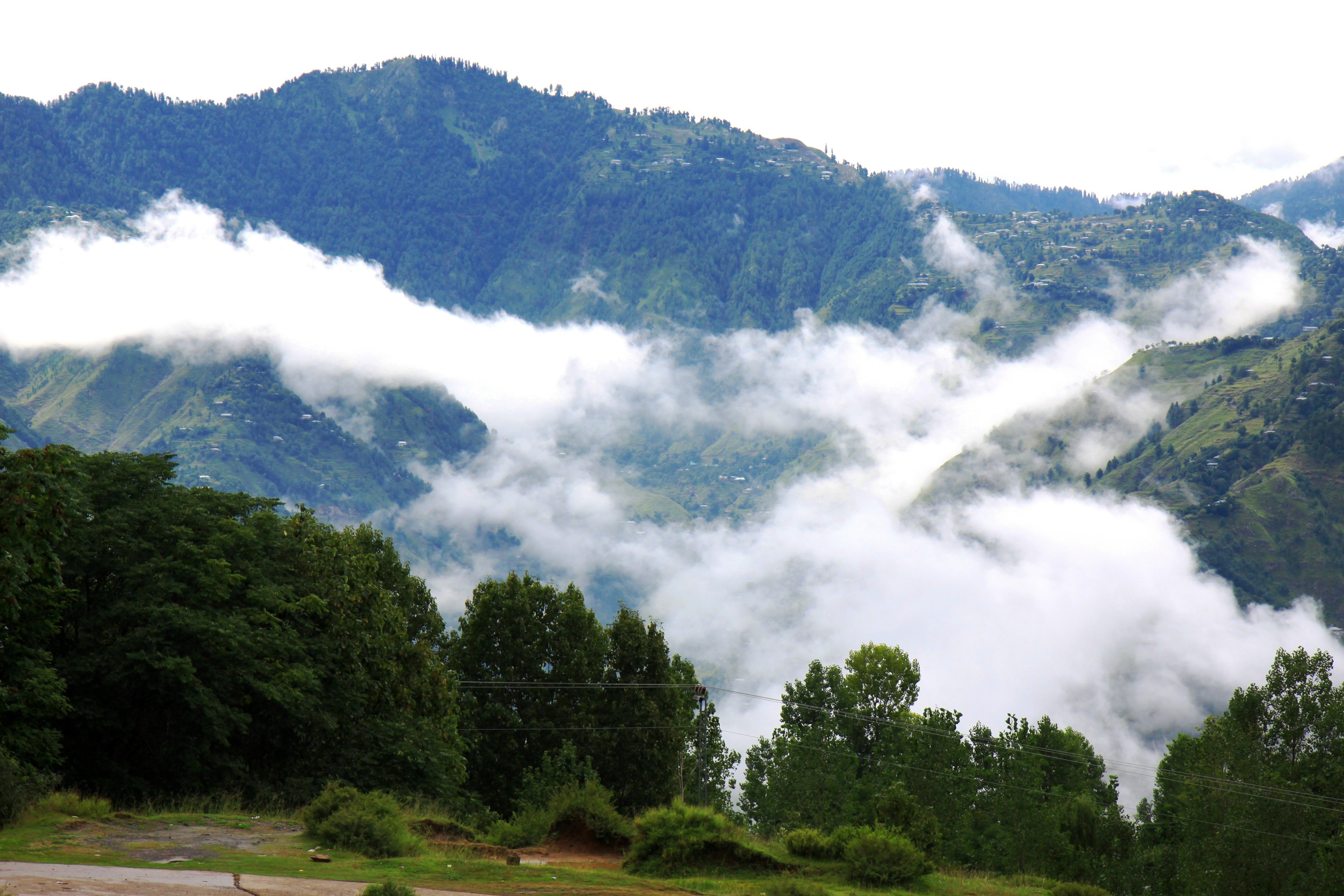

- Location within Pakistan
- Country: Pakistan
- Province: Punjab (Pakistan)
- District: Murree
- Time zone: UTC+5 (PST)

Bhurban (Urdu: بھوربن) is a small town and a hill station in Muree District, Punjab, Pakistan on the edge of Hazara, Pakistan. The resort town is named after a nearby forest. It is located approximately 11 kilometres (6.8 mi) from Murree city.

== Location ==
Bhurban is situated in between Murree and Kashmir Road at a height of about 1,828 metres (5,997 ft). It has been made accessible by the dual Islamabad-Murree Expressway, approximately a 50-km drive from Islamabad, the federal capital of Pakistan.

== Tourism ==
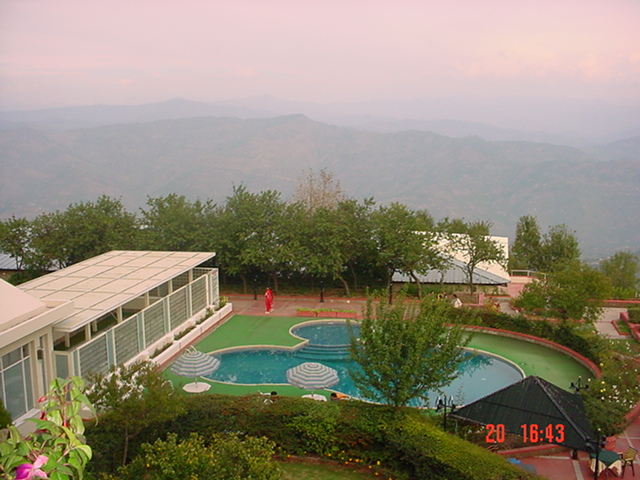
Bhurban has a wide range of tourist facilities.

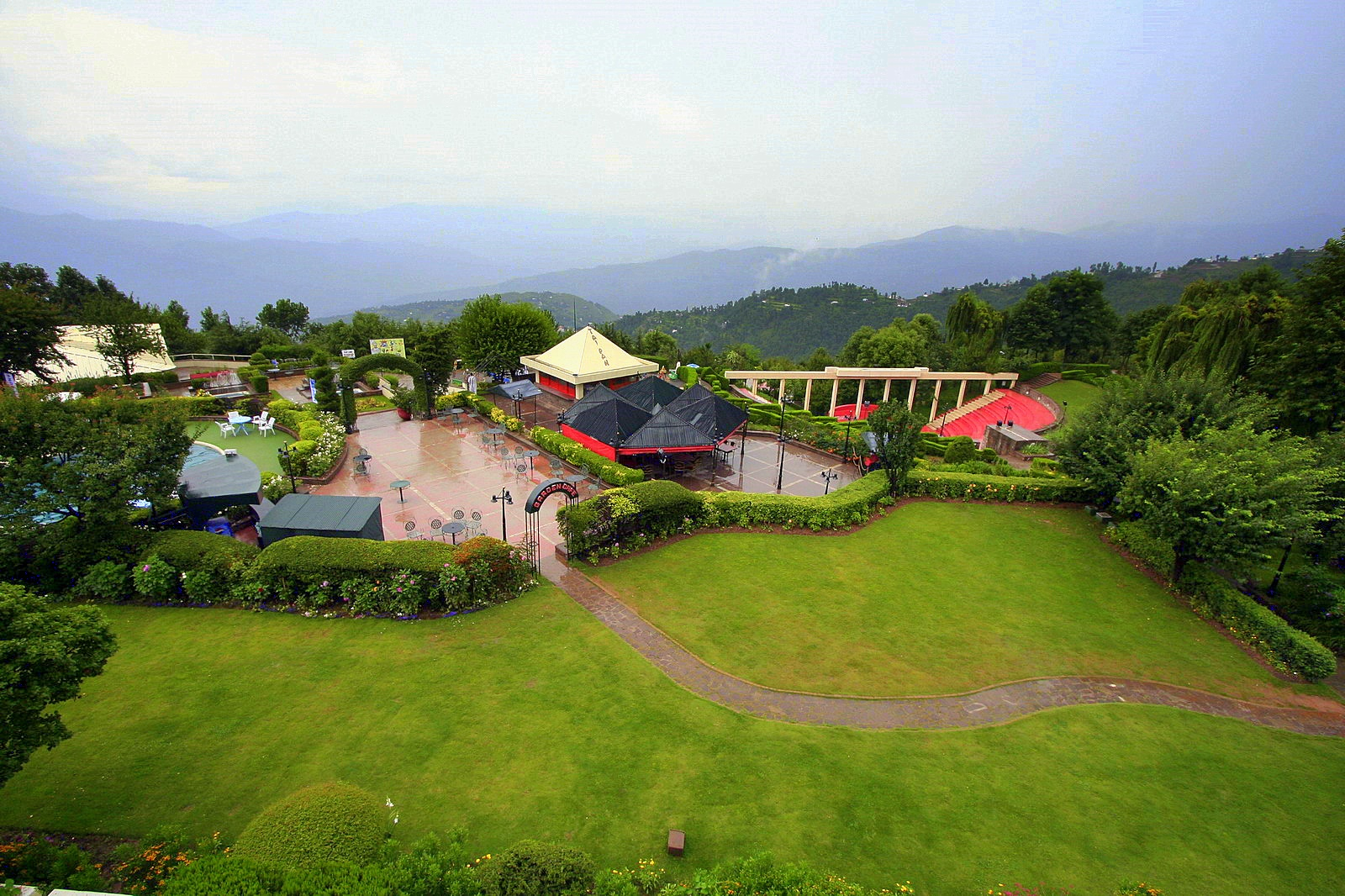
Pearl Continental Bhurban - 5 star hotel in the town

Bhurban is a tourist destination with unique flora, and a fauna with a variety species not found elsewhere in Pakistan. It is known for the hiking trails in the nearby Ayubia National Park. The '5 star' Pearl Continental Hotel - Mount Pleasant Apartments is one of several resorts in Bhurban that serve tourists visiting the Murree Hills and the national park. Bhurban also has a nine-hole golf course. Another resort in Bhurban is the Bhurban Hill Apartments, located 2 km from PC Bhurban. It has its own source of natural mineral water.. Many important personals from all over the world visited Bhurbun which were Nelson Mandela, King Hussain of Jordan and many others.

== Residents ==
Bhurban's main tribes are Dhunds (called Abbasis), Janyals, and Ahmedals, many of them being indigenous descendants of Muslim hill tribes who have lived here for centuries. Many of these tribes converted to Islam during the 14th to 15th centuries AD. Most of them still live simple rural lives, whilst a number of them have gone on to seek education and jobs in the plains, in Rawalpindi and Islamabad and even further afield.

== Administration ==
The Rawat Union Council is also responsible for managing Bhurban. Rawat village is the headquarters of the Union Council of Rawat, which is an administrative sub-division of Murree Tehsil, in the Murree District of Punjab.

== See also ==
- Murree
- Ayubia National Park
- Darya Gali
- List of hill stations of Pakistan
