= List of Pakistani administrative divisions by highest elevation =

This is a list of administrative units of Pakistan by elevation.

== Federal Capital ==
Territory	Peak	Range/Region	Height (m)	Height (ft)	Location
Islamabad	Tilla Charouni	Margalla Hills	1,604	5,262	It is located in Islamabad.

== Autonomous territories ==
Rank	Territory	Peak	Range/Region	Height (m)	Height (ft)	Location
1	Gilgit Baltistan	K2	Karakoram	8,611	28,251	It is located in Skardu District.
2	Azad Jammu and Kashmir	Sarwali Peak	Himalayas	6,326	20,755	It is located in Neelum District.

== Provinces ==
Rank	Province	Peak	Range/Region	Height (m)	Height (ft)	Location
1	Khyber Pakhtunkhwa	Tirich Mir	Hindu Kush	7,708	25,230	It is located in Chitral District.
2	Balochistan	Loe Nekan	Zarghun Ghar	3,578	11,739	It is located in Quetta District.
3	Sindh	Zardak Peak	Kirthar Mountains	2,267	7,438	It is located in Dadu District.
4	Punjab	Kashmir Point	Pir Panjal Range	2,291	7,516	It is located in Murree District.
