= Sehr Bagla =

Village in Punjab, Pakistan

Sehr Bagla سہر بگلاه
- Union council

se-har-bag-laa-h transcription(s)
- Country: Pakistan
- Province: Punjab
- District: Rawalpindi
- Tehsil: Murree

Population
  - Total: 14,002 (2,023 Census)

Sehr Bagla (سہر بگلاہ) is a village and Union Council of Murree Tehsil in the Murree District of Punjab, Pakistan. It is located in the north-east of the Tehsil and is bounded to the north by Potha Sharif, to the south by Ghel, to the west by Rawat and to the east by Kashmir

According to the 2023 census, it had a population of 14002

== Climate ==
Climate data for Sehr Bagla
| Month | Jan | Feb | Mar | Apr | May | Jun | Jul | Aug | Sep | Oct | Nov | Dec | Year |
|---|---|---|---|---|---|---|---|---|---|---|---|---|---|
| Record high °C (°F) | 17.2 (63.0) | 19.8 (67.6) | 23.0 (73.4) | 26.0 (78.8) | 32.0 (89.6) | 32.2 (90.0) | 31.7 (89.1) | 27.2 (81.0) | 25.6 (78.1) | 25.0 (77.0) | 22.3 (72.1) | 21.1 (70.0) | 32.2 (90.0) |
| Mean daily maximum °C (°F) | 7.2 (45.0) | 7.5 (45.5) | 11.6 (52.9) | 17.2 (63.0) | 21.7 (71.1) | 25.1 (77.2) | 22.4 (72.3) | 21.4 (70.5) | 20.9 (69.6) | 18.6 (65.5) | 14.5 (58.1) | 10.2 (50.4) | 16.5 (61.8) |
| Daily mean °C (°F) | 3.7 (38.7) | 4.0 (39.2) | 8.0 (46.4) | 13.2 (55.8) | 17.3 (63.1) | 20.6 (69.1) | 19.1 (66.4) | 18.4 (65.1) | 17.2 (63.0) | 14.3 (57.7) | 10.3 (50.5) | 6.3 (43.3) | 12.7 (54.9) |
| Mean daily minimum °C (°F) | 0.1 (32.2) | 0.5 (32.9) | 4.3 (39.7) | 9.1 (48.4) | 12.8 (55.0) | 16.1 (61.0) | 15.7 (60.3) | 15.4 (59.7) | 13.4 (56.1) | 10.1 (50.2) | 6.2 (43.2) | 2.4 (36.3) | 8.8 (47.9) |
| Record low °C (°F) | −8.4 (16.9) | −10.6 (12.9) | −7 (19) | −3.3 (26.1) | 0.6 (33.1) | 3.6 (38.5) | 8.9 (48.0) | 10.0 (50.0) | 6.0 (42.8) | 1.1 (34.0) | −3.3 (26.1) | −10.5 (13.1) | −10.6 (12.9) |
| Average precipitation mm (inches) | 126.5 (4.98) | 145.0 (5.71) | 176.8 (6.96) | 133.0 (5.24) | 91.9 (3.62) | 130.3 (5.13) | 339.3 (13.36) | 326.3 (12.85) | 146.5 (5.77) | 70.2 (2.76) | 32.5 (1.28) | 70.3 (2.77) | 1,788.6 (70.43) |
Source: NOAA (1961–1990)

== Education ==
Eighteen primary schools and 3 secondary schools operate in UC Sehr Bagla, including:

- Hira Secondary School
- Hira Public School Gohi Birgran
- Suffah School of Islamic Studies
- GHS Riaz Model High
- GGPS Primary Hoterian
- GGPS Neargoli
- GBPS Sehr
- GBPS Reunty
- GBPS Birgran
- GBPS Gohi
- International Science School Rionti

== Facilities ==
Old picture on the old Lower Topa- Murree highway before renovations on a Jeep hire.

The inhabitants are predominantly poor.Minimal government investment made higher education difficult to attain and has left Sehr Bagla with dangerous infrastructure. Many have moved to the Islamabad and Rawalpindi twin cities to pursue better opportunities.

Available services and facilities include restaurants, local Kiryana stores, markets, a vehicle rental store,a garage, a mosque, gas tank refill facility, PCO public call office, post office, forest office, and basic health unit.

== Mosques ==
Numerous mosques operate in UC Sehr Bagla. Most villages within the UC have constructed local mosques, including:

- Jamia Masjid (Sehr Bagla Bazaar)
- Munawwar Masjid (Mid Sehr Bagla)
- Allah Wali Masjid (Upper Sehr Bagla)
- Jamia Masjid Neargoli
- Jamia Masjid Kasseri
- Masjid As-Sahaba Rionti
- Jamia Masjid Birgran (3 Mosques)
- Jamia Masjid Gohi

== Tribes ==
As with the majority of the Murree Hills, the main tribe is Dhund Abbasi, while Kethwal and Dhanyal tribe members also settled there. One Gujjar family has reportedly also lived there.

The northern half of the Murree Tehsil is held entirely by the Dhund, who claim to be Abbasi Arabs, claiming descent from Muhammad's uncle Abbas ibn Abdul Mutalib. The Satti tribe, which claims Rajput ancestry is confined to the hilly Kotli Sattian Tehsil. Between these two tribes are wedged the Kethwal, who claim descent from the Greek general Alexander the Great. The Dhanyal hold the western half of the Murree Tehsil, known as the Karor illaqa, as well as villages in the Islamabad Capital Territory. Like the Awan, the Dhanyal claim descent from the Prophet Mohammed's son in-law Ali. The smallest of the Murree Hill tribes are the Jasgam, who inhabit villages in the hilly portion of the Kahuta Tehsil. Like the Dhund, they claim to be Abbasi Arabs.

== Transport ==
Local Transport

- New highway refurbishment in 2017 makes travel in all veichles easier
- Suzuki Carry, Jeeps are a common form of transport from Gohi and Birgran to Sehr Bagla. Taxis support local travel.
- New green Punjab Buses travel to Muzaffarabad & Rawalpindi/Islamabad
- Ghilani Coach Service reaches Lahore and Karachi
