= Darya Gali =

Coordinates: 33°57′0″N 73°21′7″E

- Union Council
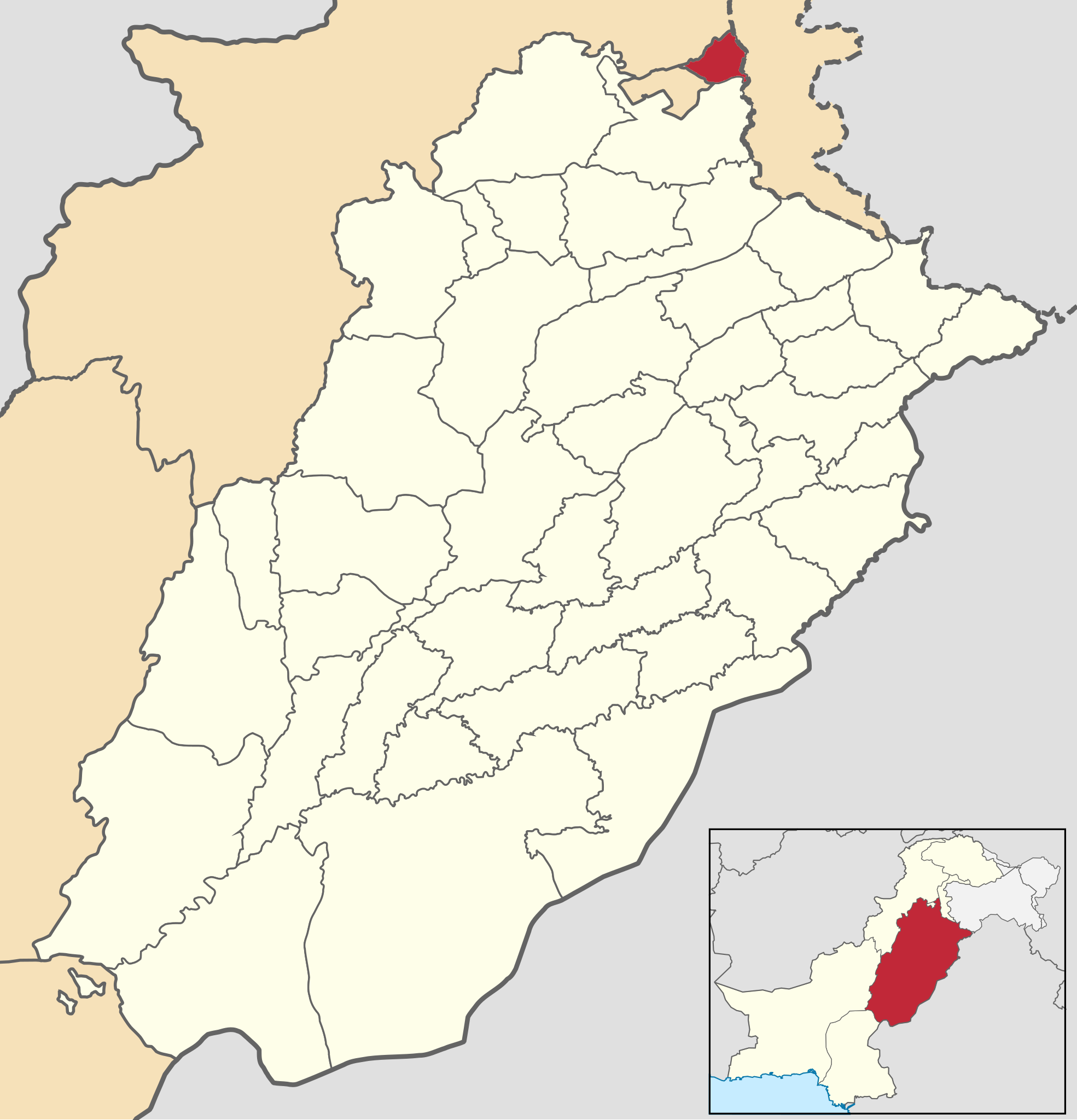
- Map showing the location of the Murree district in Punjab, Pakistan
- Interactive map of Darya Gali
- Country: Pakistan
- Province: Punjab
- District: Murree
- Tehsil: Murree

Population
  - Total: 11,414

Darya Gali is a village and union council of Murree Tehsil in the Murree District of Punjab, Pakistan. It is located in the north of the tehsil and is bounded to the north by Abbottabad District, to the south by Ghora Gali and Murree, and to the west by Rawat.

According to the 1998 census of Pakistan it had a population of 11,414.
