= Muhammad Latasab Satti =

Pakistani politician

Member of the Provincial Assembly of the Punjab
- In office 15 August 2018 – 14 January 2023
- Constituency: PP-6 Rawalpindi-I

Personal details
- Party: PTI (2018-present)

Muhammad Latasab Satti is a Pakistani politician who had been a member of the Provincial Assembly of the Punjab from August 2018 till January 2023.

== Early life and education ==
He was born on 10 October 1950 in Rawalpindi, Pakistan.

He is a retired Major from Pakistan Army and has received graduation level education.

== Political career ==
He was elected to the Provincial Assembly of the Punjab as a candidate of the Pakistan Tehreek-e-Insaf (PTI) from PP-6 Rawalpindi-I in the 2018 Punjab provincial election. He received 64,642 votes and defeated Raja Ashfaq Sarwar, a candidate of Pakistan Muslim League Nawaz (PML-N).

He ran for a seat in the Provincial Assembly from PP-6 Rawalpindi-I as a candidate of the PTI in the 2023 Punjab provincial election.
