= Basand =

- Village
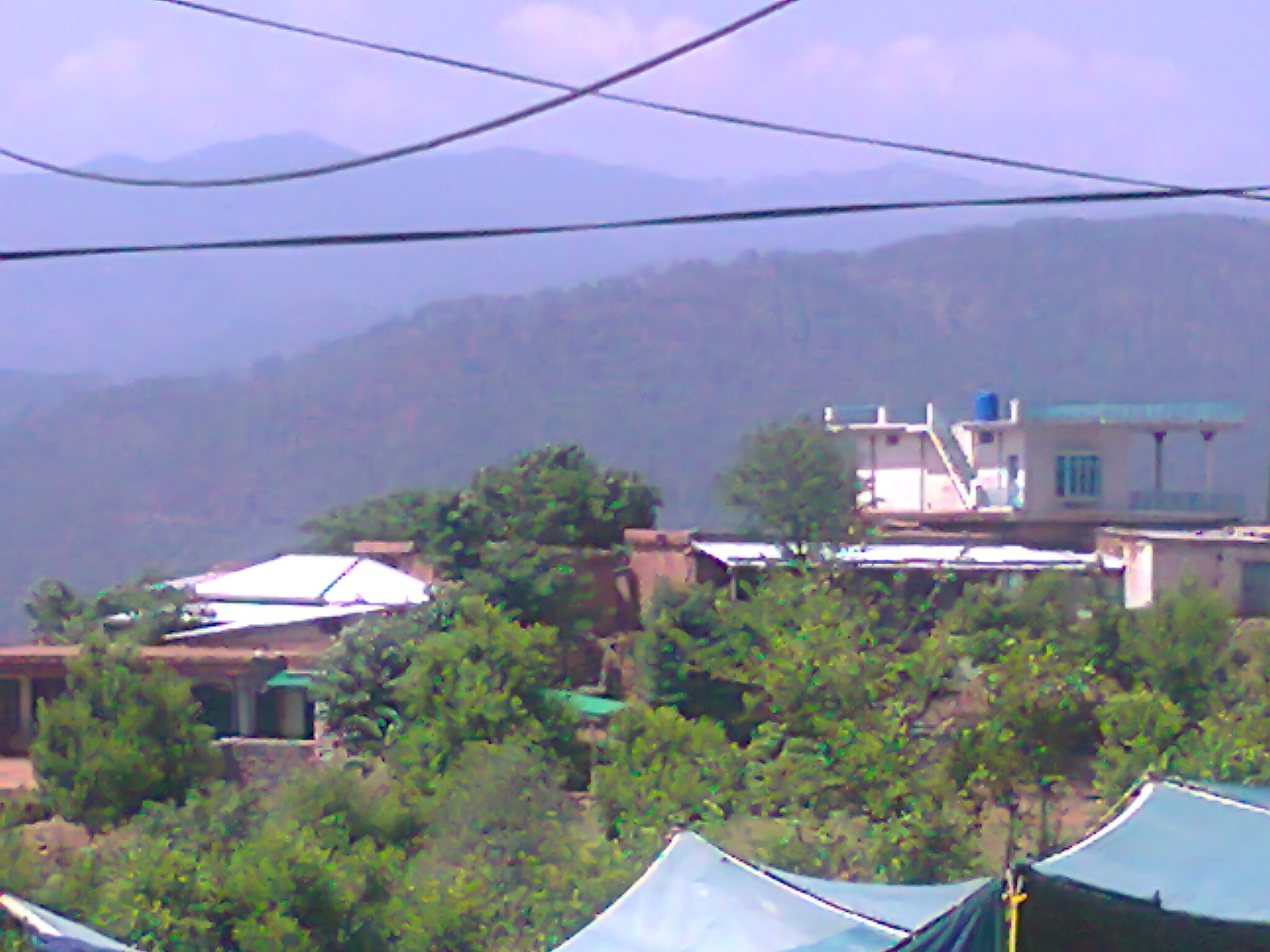
- Basand

- Location within Pakistan
- Country: Pakistan
- Province: Punjab
- District: Murree
- Time zone: UTC+5 (PST)

Basand is a village in Murree District of Punjab province of Pakistan.
