= Raja Ashfaq Sarwar =

Pakistani politician

Raja Ashfaq Sarwar راجہ اشفاق سرور

ex Member Punjab Assembly, PMLN Minister for Labour & Human Resource
- In office 11 May 2013 – 2018

Secretary General PMLN Punjab
- In office 2008 – 26 March 2013

Adviser to Chief Minister Punjab
- In office 2008–2013

Member Punjab Assembly, Minister for Health & Population Welfare
- In office 1997–1999

Member Punjab Assembly,
- In office 1993–1996

Member Punjab Assembly, Minister for Youth Affairs Minister for Forestry, Wildlife, & Fisheries
- In office 1990–1992

Member Punjab Assembly, Minister for Labour
- In office 1988–1990

Personal details
- Born: 27 October 1954 Rawalpindi, Pakistan
- Died: 11 April 2020 (aged 65)
- Party: Pakistan Muslim League (N)
- Relations: Shahid Khaqan Abbasi (cousin); Sadia Abbasi (cousin)
- Education: Lawrence College
- Website: www.pmln.org.pk

Raja Ashfaq Sarwar (Urdu: راجا اشفاک سارور; 27 October 1954 — 11 April 2020) was a Pakistani politician, Member of Punjab Assembly, former Adviser to Chief Minister of Punjab, and Minister for Labour and Human Resource. He was Secretary General of the center-right party PMLN in Punjab. He had held various portfolios over his career including Minister for Youth Affairs, Minister for Forestry Wildlife & Fisheries, and Minister for Health.

== Early life and education ==
Raja Ashfaq Sarwar, born at Holy Family Hospital in Rawalpindi, hails from the village of Ghora Gali in the Murree Hills and is the eldest son of Raja Ghulam Sarwar (late) a two-time member of West Pakistan Assembly. He attended Lawrence College.

== Political career ==
His political career started in 1988 when he successfully contested a Punjab Assembly seat from Murree as an Independent candidate. He joined PML (a part of IJI then) later becoming PMLN, and was appointed Provincial Labour Minister.

He successfully contested the same seat in 1990 and became the Punjab Minister for Forestry, Wildlife, Fisheries and Minister of Youth Affairs. Within the party he became President of PML Youth Wing Punjab where he appointed Khawaja Saad Rafique as general secretary. He was re-elected as an MPA in 1993 and 1997 where he became Provincial Minister for Health and Population Welfare up until the 1999 coup d'état by General Pervez Musharraf.

Following the Military Coup he took a break from his own elections to focus on strengthening PML N, and restoring Democracy and the Judiciary in Pakistan. During this period he was twice-elected as General Secretary of PMLN in Punjab and currently holds this position. In 2008 he was appointed Adviser to Chief Minister of Punjab Shahbaz Sharif.

On 11 May 2013 he was again elected as Member of Punjab Assembly from his home constituency of PP-1 in Rawalpindi District, serving Tehsil Murree and Tehsil Kotli Sattian, however he lost the 2018 General Election to Major Latosab Satti, a candidate of PTI.

He died on 11 April 2020 at the age of 65 after a prolonged illness.

== Election history ==
Provincial Assembly of Pakistan PP-1 Rawalpindi I, 2013
Party	Candidate	Votes	%	±%
PML(N)	Raja Ashfaq Sarwar	51,108	38.7	
PTI	Sardar Saleem Khan	23,498	17.8	

Provincial Assembly of Pakistan PP-8 Rawalpindi VIII, 1997
Party	Candidate	Votes	%	±%
PML(N)	Raja Ashfaq Sarwar	22,468	53.8	
Independent	Sardar Sajid Khan	11,211	26.8	

Provincial Assembly of Pakistan PP-8 Rawalpindi VIII, 1993
Party	Candidate	Votes	%	±%
PML(N)	Raja Ashfaq Sarwar	26,983	47.0	
PPP	Hafiz-ur-Rehman Abbasi	17,069	29.7	

Provincial Assembly of Pakistan PP-8 Rawalpindi VIII, 1990
Party	Candidate	Votes	%	±%
PML(N)	Raja Ashfaq Sarwar	41,275	82.3	
PPP	Muharram Ali Abbasi	12,505	22.7	

Provincial Assembly of Pakistan PP-8 Rawalpindi VIII, 1988
Party	Candidate	Votes	%	±%
Independent	Raja Ashfaq Sarwar	20,696	37.3	
PPP	Muharram Ali Abbasi	15,246	27.5	
