= Ghel =

- Union council
- Country: Pakistan
- Province: Punjab
- District: Murree
- Tehsil: Murree

Population
  - Total: 9,488

Ghel is a village and union council of Murree Tehsil in the Murree District of Punjab, Pakistan.

It is north-east of the tehsil. According to the 1998 census of Pakistan it had a population of 9,488.
