= Bani Seri =

Coordinates: 33°47′N 73°24′E

Bani Seri is a village in Kotli Sattian Tehsil, Rawalpindi District, Punjab, Pakistan, in the Karore Valley. This village is in the area of Union Council Aryari.
