= Angoori, Murree =

Angoori
- Union Council
- Location within Punjab, Pakistan Location within Pakistan
- Coordinates: 33.80082°N 73.33948°E
- Country: Pakistan
- Province: Punjab
- District: Murree
- Tehsil: Murree

Population
  - Total: 11,414

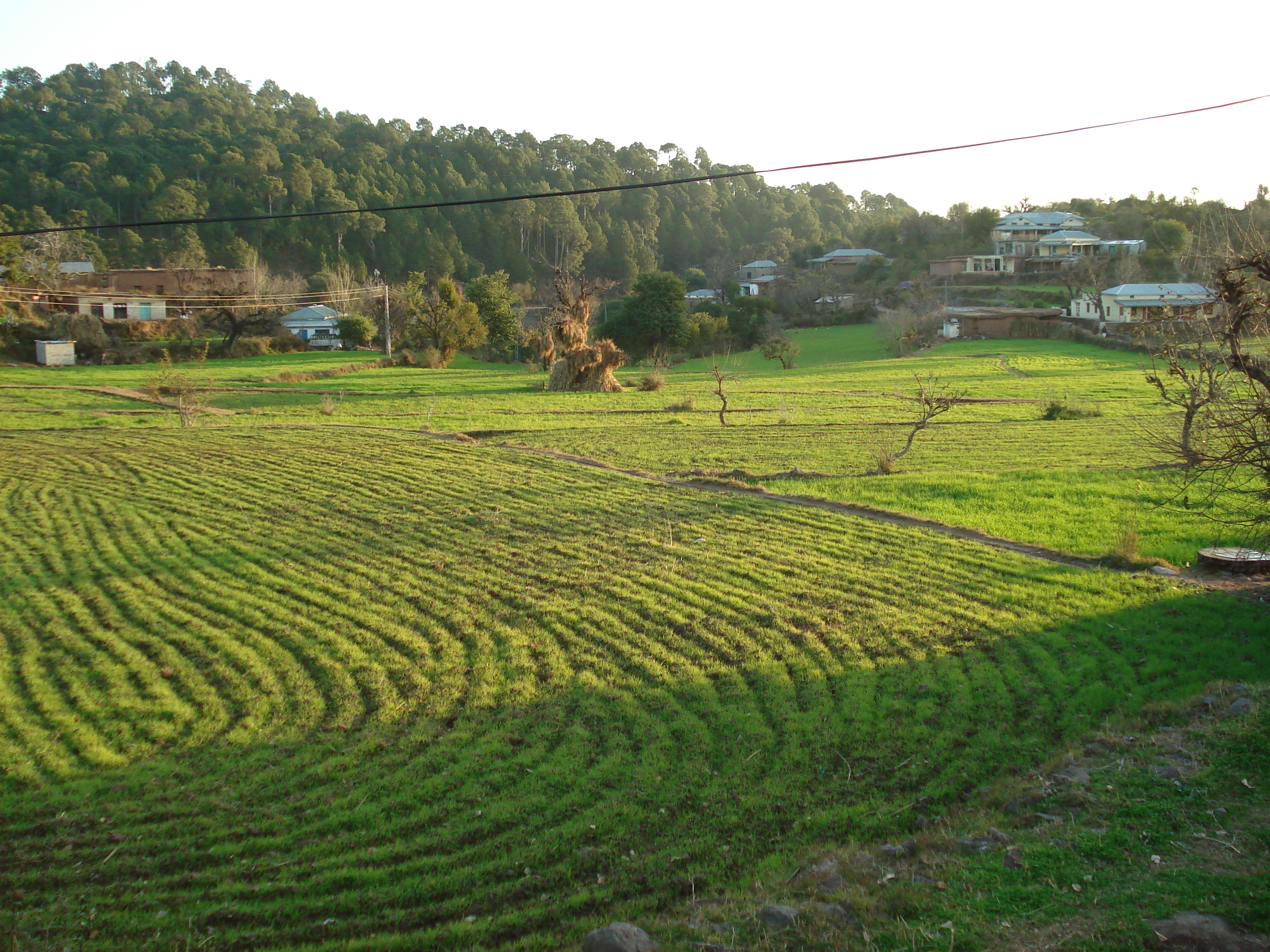

Angoori is a village and union council of Murree Tehsil in the Murree District of Punjab, Pakistan. It is located in the south of the tehsil and is bounded to the north-west by Tret, to the north by Numbal and Mussiari, to the north-east by Ban and to the south by the Islamabad Capital Territory. The area is known for its peaceful environment, adaptive and pleasant weather with an eye catching view of the twin cities.

According to the 1998 census of Pakistan it had a population of 11,414. noble people's Raja Sadaqat Ali Abbasi, Air Cdr Hafeez ur Rehman, Sub Ashraf khan, SE M Maqsood khan, Raja M Qayyum khan, Brig Manzoor Ahmed Abbasi and Raja Uzair, Rangbaz Khan.
