= Numbal =

- Union council
- Country: Pakistan
- Province: Punjab
- District: Murree
- Tehsil: Murree

Population
  - Total: 11,547

Numbal is a village and union council of Murree Tehsil in the Murree District of Punjab, Pakistan.

It is located in the south central area of the tehsil to the south of Murree. According to the 1998 census of Pakistan it had a population of 11,547.
