= Badnian =

Village in Punjab, Pakistan

- Location within Pakistan
- Coordinates: 33.48°N 73.33°E
- Country: Pakistan
- Province: Punjab
- Elevation: 786 m (2,579 ft)
- Time zone: UTC+5 (PST)

Badnian is a village of Rawalpindi District in the Punjab province of Pakistan. It is located at 33°48'0N 73°33'0E with an altitude of 786 metres (2585 feet).
