= Dewal =

Dewal Sharif
- Union council
- Dewal Sharif is located in the north of Murree Tehsil
- Country: Pakistan
- Province: Punjab
- District: Murree
- Tehsil: Murree

Government
  - MNA: Sardar Noor Khan

Population
  - Total: 11,052

Dewal also known as Dewal Sharif is a Union council of Murree Tehsil, a sub division of Murree District in the Punjab province of Pakistan.

According to the 1998 census of Pakistan it had a population of 11,052.

== Dewal and Dewal Shareef ==
Dewal is a Sanskrit word means a small temple, but Pir Abdul Majid (Pir Sahib Dewal Shareef) who migrated to Rawalpindi in mid fifties last century and established a shrine with the support of Ex-President of Pakistan General Ayub Khan, in Faizabad between Islamabad and Rawalpindi translated and Islamized Hindu small temple common noun Dewal into Dewal Shareef.
