= Kashmir Point =

Picturesque spot in Murree, Pakistan

Kashmir Point is a scenic viewpoint in Murree, Pakistan, where the mountains of Kashmir can be viewed. It is situated on the Mall Road. The point is 7500 feet above sea level and is the highest view at the location.
