= Pindi Point =

Mountain-view tourist spot in Punjab, Pakistan

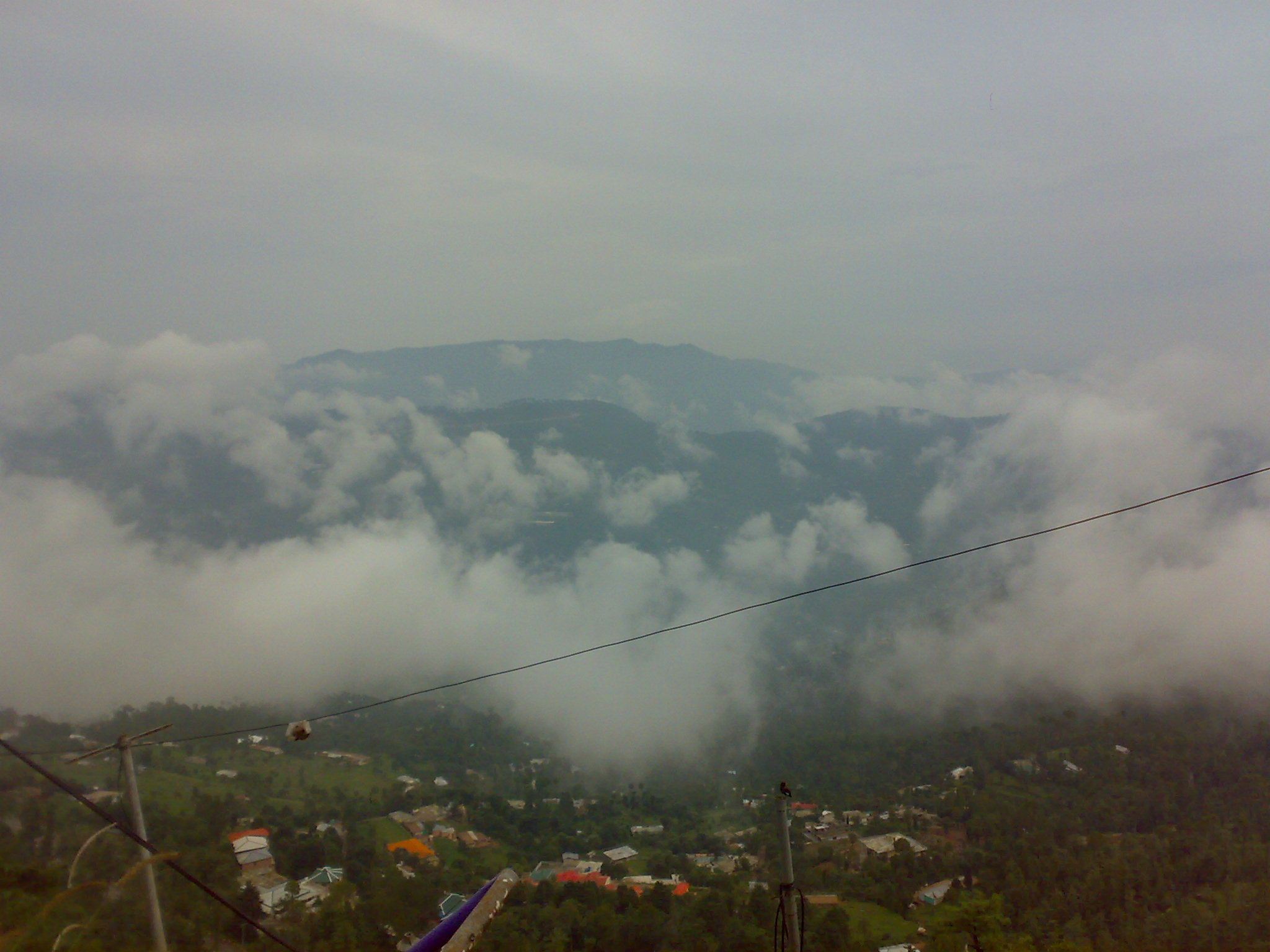
- View from Pindi Point

Geography
- Location: Murree, Punjab
- Country: Pakistan

Pindi Point (Urdu: پنڈی پوائنٹ ) is a mountain view tourist spot in Murree, Punjab, Pakistan. It has a view of the high mountains and forests of Murree. On Pindi Point, tourists can easily see the cities of Rawalpindi and Islamabad.

== Demographics ==
Pindi Point is a 15-minute walk from Mall Road, Murree. All of the pedestrian walk is in zigzag formation and covered with tall pine trees. It has a cafe and playgrounds for children.

== Pindi Point Chair Lift ==
A chair lift has been installed that goes down 1.5 km of Pindi Point.

== See also ==
- Mai Mari da Ashtan
