= READ Foundation =

Non-profit educational network in Pakistan

- Abbreviation: READ
- Formation: 1994
- Type: Nonprofit organization
- Purpose: To address the need for education and literacy in Pakistan
- Headquarters: Islamabad, Pakistan
- Region served: Khyber Pakhtunkhwa, Punjab, Islamabad Capital Territory, Gilgit-Baltistan, Azad Jammu and Kashmir
- Chairman: Jamil Ahmed
- CEO: Afzaal Ahmad
- Website: Official website, UK website

The Rural Education and Development (READ) Foundation is a non-profit educational network in Pakistan, founded in 1994. It operates schools and literacy centres in Khyber Pakhtunkhwa, Punjab, the outskirts of Islamabad and Rawalpindi, Gilgit-Baltistan, and Azad Jammu and Kashmir.

READ Foundation was established in 1994 when it opened its first school in Riala, a village in the Bagh District of Azad Jammu and Kashmir, with one teacher, one classroom and 25 students. As of 2026, the foundation operates 624 educational institutions across Pakistan, comprising 422 formal schools, 120 literacy centres, and 82 schools adopted from the Government of Punjab. According to the foundation's official social media page, this network serves approximately 135,000 students, including 14,000 orphans; its international fundraising affiliates in the United Kingdom and United States separately report lower figures for Pakistan of around 120,000 students, 5,967 teachers, and 13,000 orphans across more than 400 schools, indicating some variation between the organisation's own published figures.

== History ==
In the 2005 Kashmir earthquake, the foundation lost a number of its school buildings; it subsequently worked to rebuild schools and support affected children.

In June 2024, the Special Communications Organisation, a telecommunications subsidiary of the Pakistan Army operating in Azad Jammu and Kashmir, opened a software technology park in Muzaffarabad in collaboration with READ Foundation, intended to foster information-technology skills among local youth; a separate technology park opened the same day in Rawalakot was established with the state-run University of Poonch rather than with READ Foundation.

In March 2026, the Water and Power Development Authority (WAPDA) allocated over 94.2 million rupees for 75 community-based girls' schools in Diamer District, Gilgit-Baltistan, under the Community-Based Accelerated Learning Schools (CBALS) programme linked to the Diamer-Bhasha Dam project. The schools, intended to enable around 2,250 out-of-school girls in Chilas, Tangir and Darel to access primary education, are being run through a joint arrangement involving WAPDA, the Gilgit-Baltistan Education Department and READ Foundation.

== International offices ==
The foundation maintains fundraising offices in the United Kingdom, the United States, and Canada that support its schools in Pakistan. In the United Kingdom, it is a registered charity under number 1160256. In the United States, it is registered as a nonprofit organisation. Beyond Pakistan, the foundation also runs education and welfare programmes in Bangladesh, Lebanon, Turkey and Yemen.
