= Kotli Sattian Tehsil =

- Tehsil
- Country: Pakistan
- Province: (Punjab, Pakistan) Punjab
- District: Murree
- Capital: Kotli Sattian
- Towns: 1

Area
  - Tehsil: 304 km^{2} (117 sq mi)

Population (2023)
  - Tehsil: 120,421
  - Density: 396/km^{2} (1,030/sq mi)
  - Urban: ...
  - Rural: ...

Literacy (2023)
  - Literacy rate: 88.20%
- Time zone: UTC+5 (PST)
- Postal code: 47260

Kotli Sattian (Urdu: کوٹلی ستیاں) is a Tehsil (subdivision) of Murree District in the Punjab province of Pakistan. Its name is derived from the mountain town of Kotli and the Satti tribe. This subdivision is geographically a part of the Murree and Kahuta hills. In 1990, it was declared a subdivision comprising 40 villages, which were separated from both subdivisions.

== Demographics ==
=== Population ===
Historical population
Year	Pop.	±% p.a.
1951	...	—
1961	...	—
1972	...	—
1981	83,255	—
1998	81,524	−0.12%
2017	119,312	+2.02%
2023	120,421	+0.15%

The population of the villages comprising Kotli Sattian town (tehsil) was 83,255 in 1981. The 1998 census shows the figure was at 81,524, a decrease of 2.1 percent. The 2017 census recorded a population of 119,312, and the census of 2023 reported a further rise to 120,421.

== Geography ==
Kotli Sattian is a Tehsil of Murree district which is located in the Pir Panjal Range bordering with Kashmir. Before 1990, It was a part of Tehsil Murree. In establishing this tehsil, some areas of Kahuta tehsil were also included in it. It is 50 km away from Islamabad on the banks of Jhelum River. Most front areas of AJK are District. Bagh, Rawalakot and Pallandri. The Jhelum River separates Mallot Sattian, Badnian, Begal, Thoon and Chijana from Kashmir.

== Gallery ==
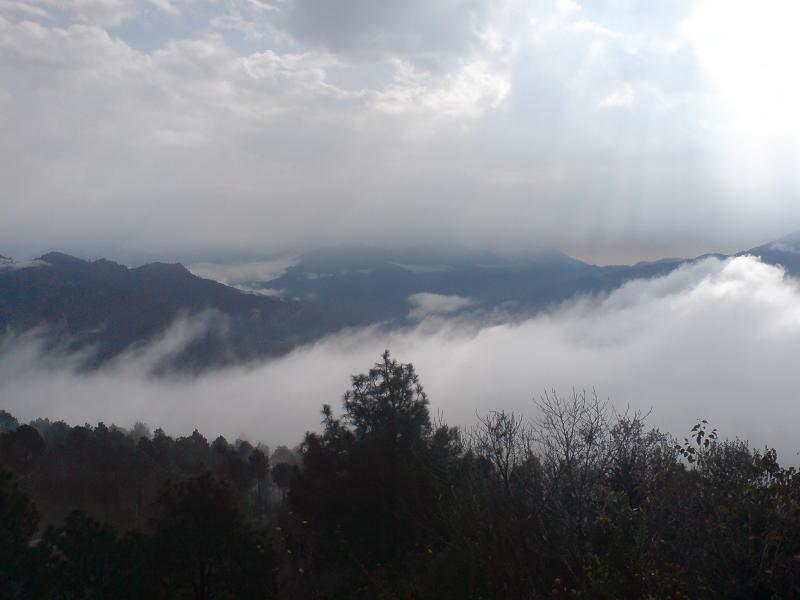
Korana, Kotli Sattian

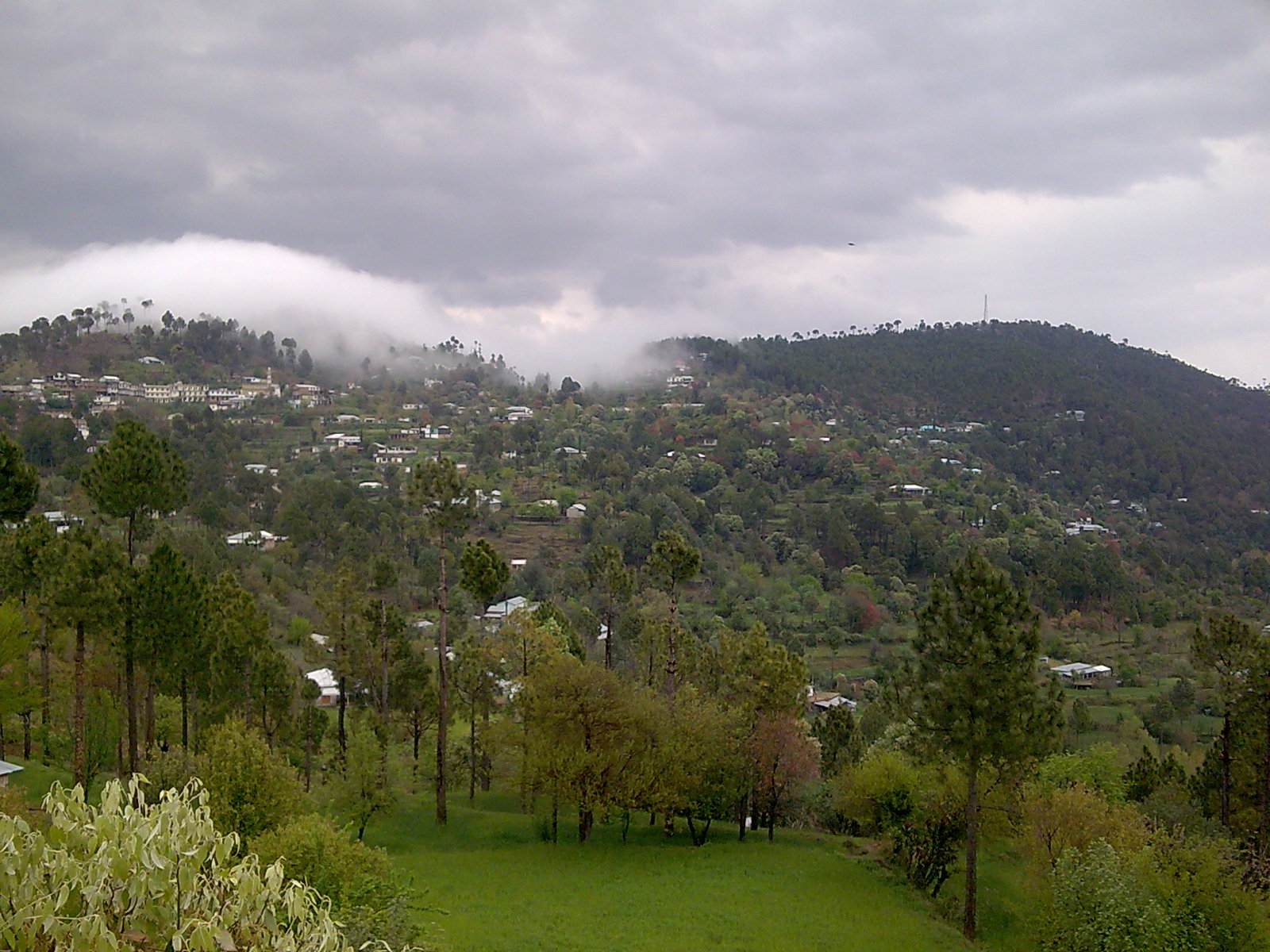
Village view, Kotli Sattian

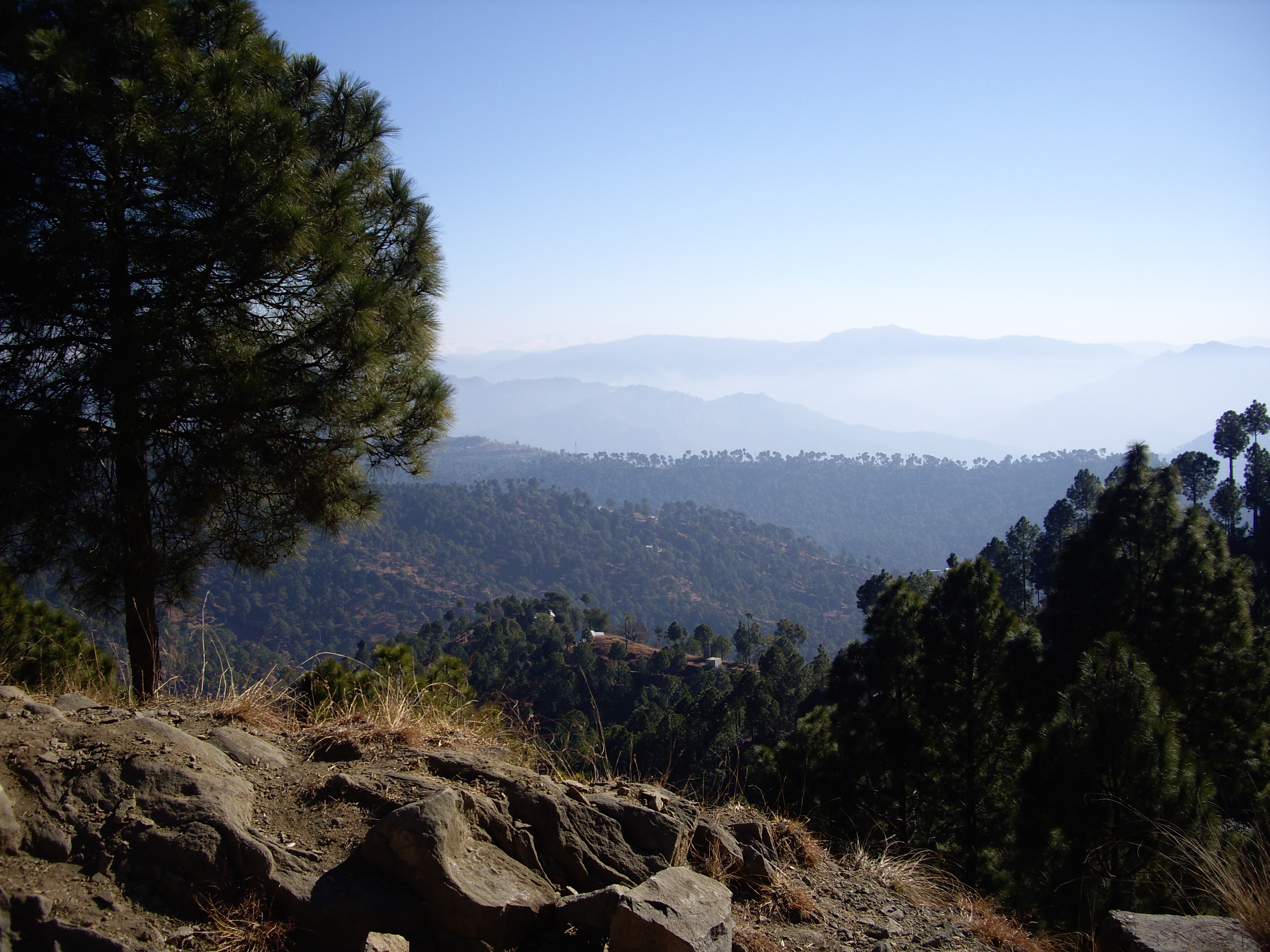
Hills, Kotli Sattian

== See also ==
- Tehsils of Pakistan
  - Tehsils of Punjab
- Districts of Pakistan
  - Districts of Punjab
- Divisions of Pakistan
  - Divisions of Punjab
