= Murree =

Town in Punjab, Pakistan

Murree مری
- Municipal Corporation
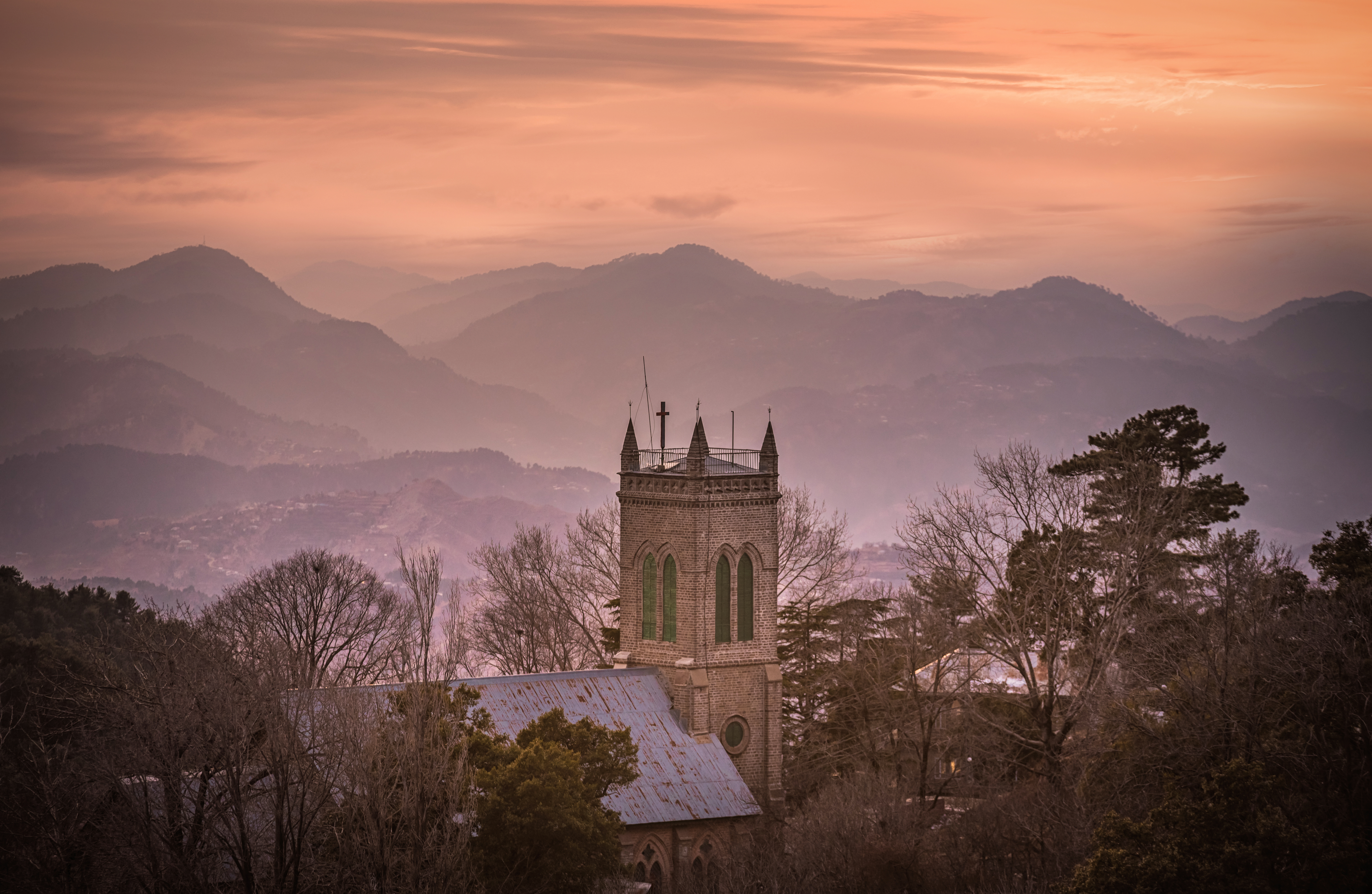
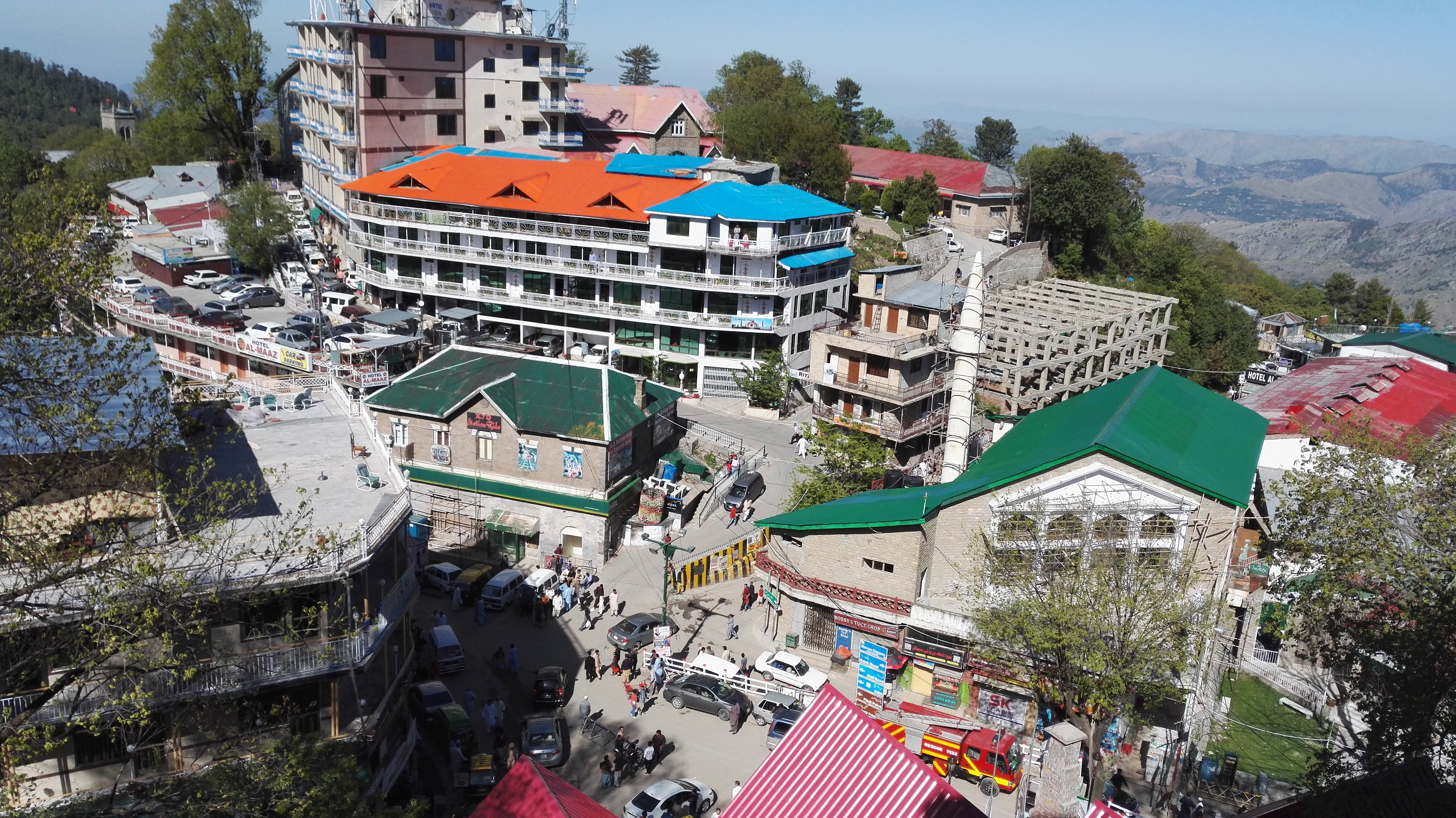
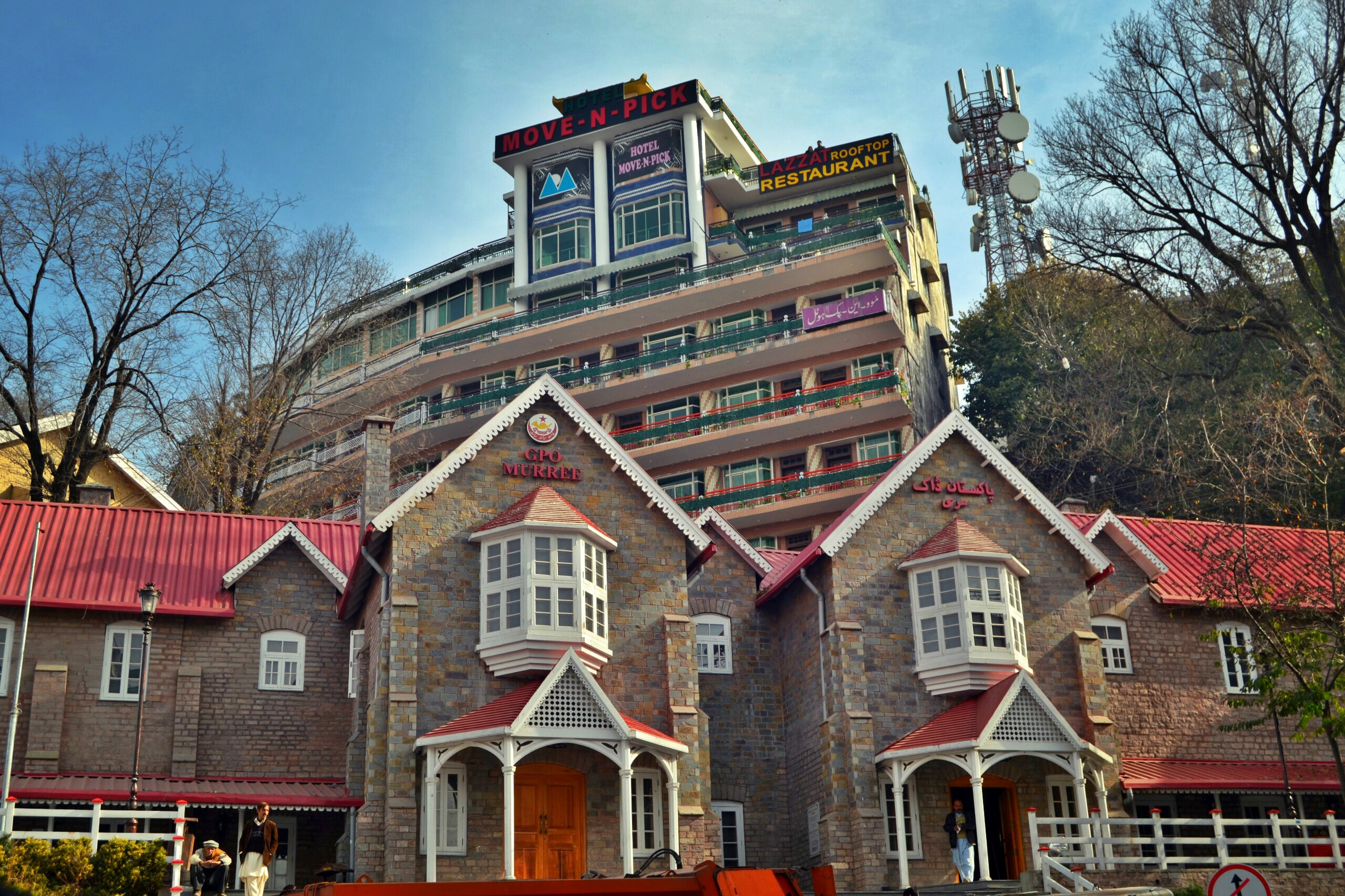
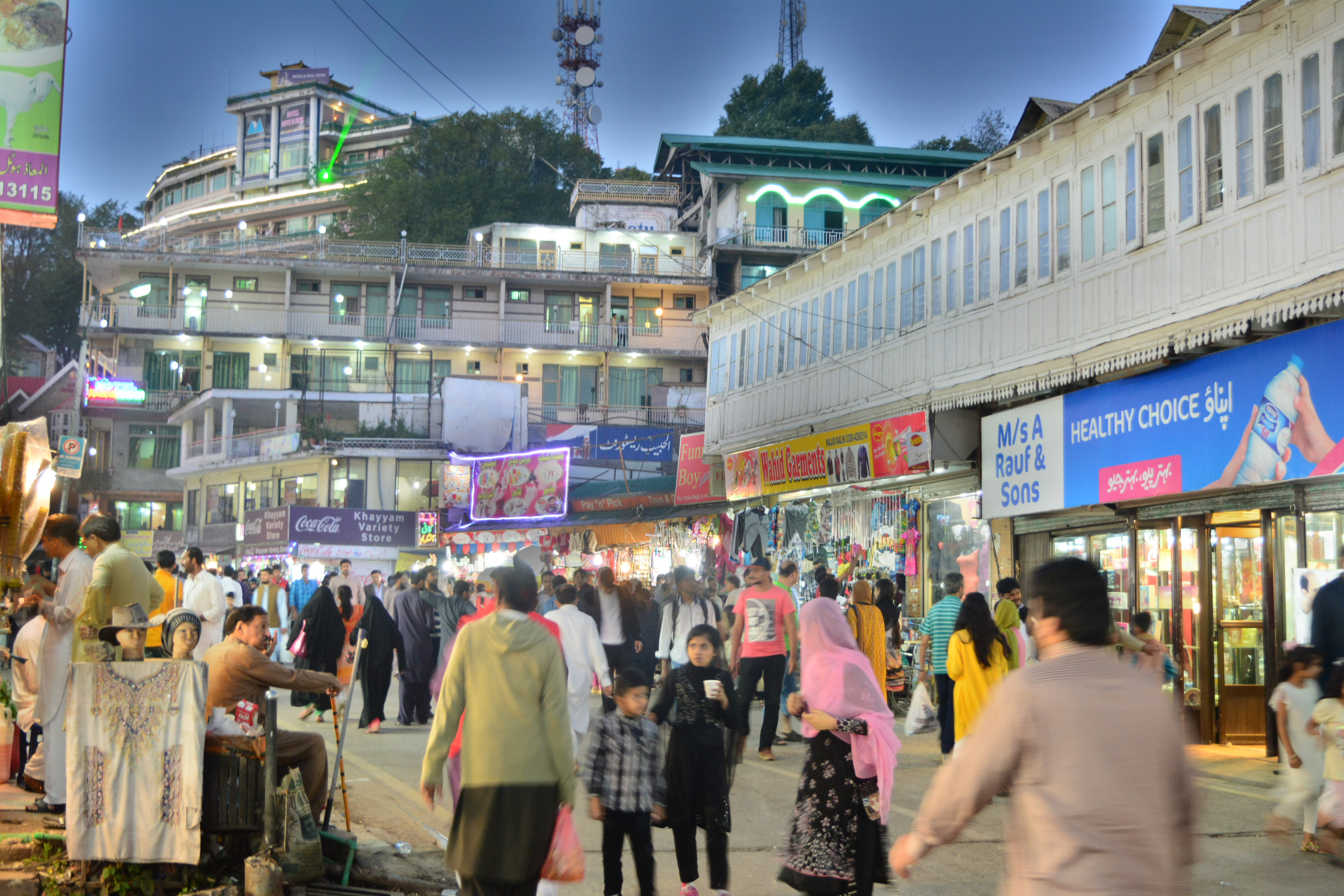
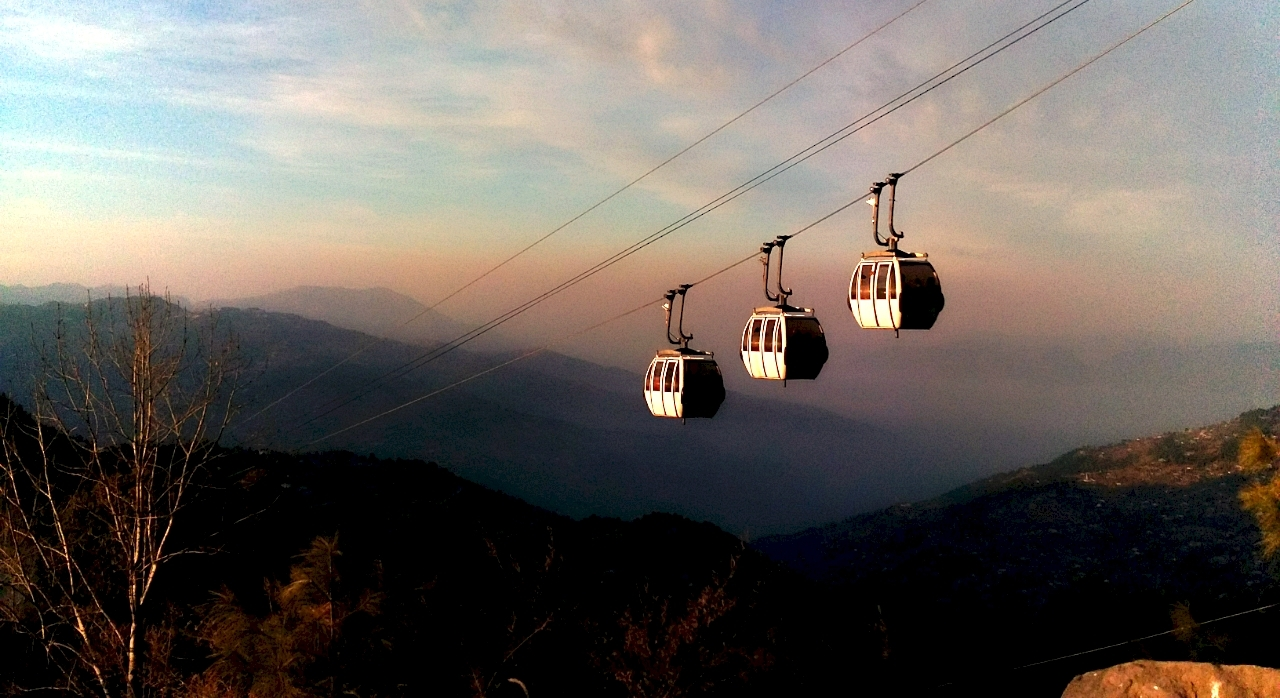
- Holy Trinity Church Cantonment area General Post Office Mall Road Patriata's Gondola Lift
- Nicknames: The Depot, The White City
- Location within Punjab, Pakistan Location within Pakistan
- Coordinates: 33°54′15″N 73°23′25″E
- Country: Pakistan
- Province: (Punjab, Pakistan) Punjab
- District: Murree
- Tehsil: Murree

Government
  - Type: Municipal Corporation
  - Mayor: Seat Vacant
  - District Commissioner: Agha Zaheer Abbas Sherazi
  - Tehsildar: Kanwar M. Ayyan
- Elevation: 2,291.2 m (7,517 ft)

Population (2023)
  - Total: 25,186 (Note: This figure includes the population of Murree Municipal Committee and Murree Hills cantonment.)
- Time zone: UTC+5 (PKT)
- Postal code: 47150

Murree (Note: Punjabi, Urdu: مری) is a mountain resort city in the northernmost region of the Punjab province of Pakistan. Lying in the Galyat region of the Pir Panjal Range under the western Himalayas, it is located in the northeast of the capital city of Islamabad. The town was built in the mid-19th century and served as the summer capital of the British Punjab, allowing British troops to escape the scorching heat of the plains of Punjab. It has an average altitude of 2,291 metres (7,516 ft).

Construction of the town started in 1851 on the hills of Murree as a sanatorium for British troops. The permanent town of Murree was constructed in 1853 and a church was consecrated shortly thereafter. One main road was established, commonly referred to as "Mall Road". Murree was the headquarters of the colonial Government of the Punjab Province during the 1873–1875 summer; the summer capital was moved to Shimla in 1876.

Murree became a popular tourist station for British citizens of the British Raj. It is the birthplace of several prominent Britons including Bruce Bairnsfather, Francis Younghusband, Reginald Dyer and Joanna Kelley. During the colonial era, access to commercial establishments was restricted for non-Europeans. Such establishments included Lawrence College, Murree.

Since the independence of Pakistan in 1947, Murree has retained its position as a popular hill station, noted for its pleasant summer weather. It is located close to the Islamabad–Rawalpindi metropolitan area from where it attracts huge number of tourists. The town also serves as a transit point for tourists visiting Azad Kashmir and Abbottabad. The town is noted for its Tudorbethan and neo-gothic architecture. The Government of Pakistan owns a summer retreat in Murree, where foreign dignitaries including heads of state often visit.

== History ==
Murree in 1870

Murree or Marhee also spelt Marhi which means high place, as it was then called, was first identified as a potential hill station by Major James Abbott in 1847. (Note: The earliest British discovery of Murree, like many of the adjacent hill resorts in the Galyat range of the Hazara region, was first made by Major James Abbott in 1847. Please see Charles Allen Soldier Sahibs: The Men who made the North West Frontier London: Abacus Books, 2001 p. 141, ISBN 0-349-11456-0; and Journals of Honoria Lawrence eds. J. Lawrence and A. Widdiwis, London: Hodder & Stoughton, 1980 edition. For an account of Abbott's early time in Hazara and the founding of Abbottabad, see Omer Tarin and SD Najumddin, "Five Early Military Graves in the Old Christian Cemetery, Abbottabad, Pakistan, 1853–1888", in The Kipling Journal (ISSN 0023-1738) Vol 84, No 339, p.35-52) When Abbott arrived at the site he wrote:

"I was probably the first Englishman that had ever set foot upon it... I saw here for the first time the magnificent mass of Mount Maachpoora of which I had heard and dreamed so much, presenting toward the River Jelum a stupendous surface of precipice. Its summit is densely covered with cedar forests and is the resort of Jogies and alchemysts from India, who hold watch there by night expecting, by dint of certain incantations and ceremonies, to discern the spirits which alight as flames of fire upon plants profes-sing alchemical properties."

The town's early development was in 1851 by the president of the Punjab Administrative Board, Sir Henry Lawrence. It was originally established as a sanatorium for British troops garrisoned on the Afghan frontier. Officially, the municipality was created in 1850.

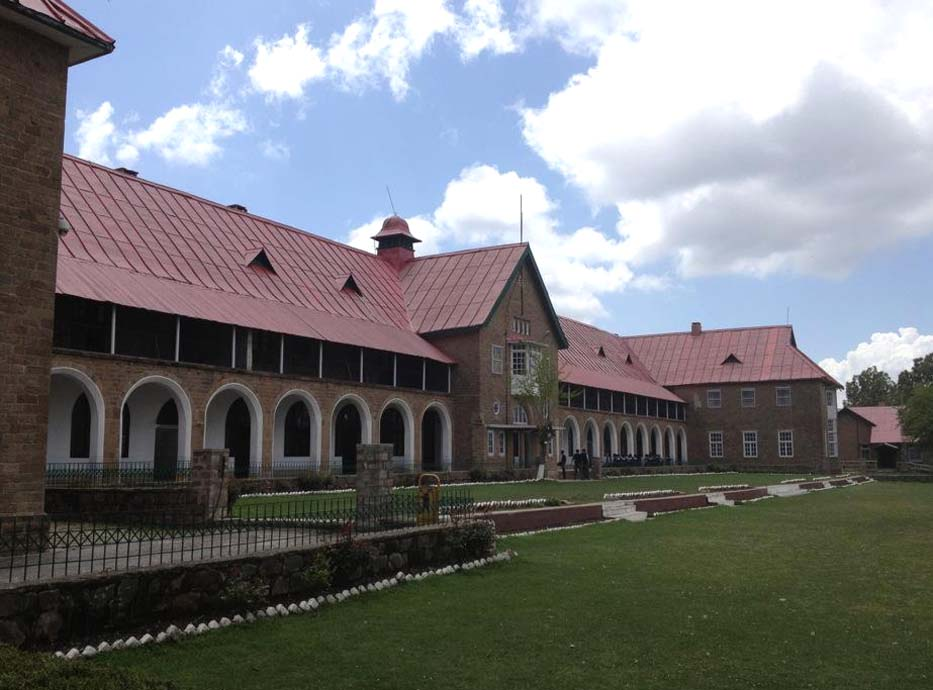
Senior School of the Lawrence College, Murree established in 1860 as part of the Lawrence Military Asylums

The permanent town of Murree was constructed at Sunnybank in 1853. The church was sanctified in May 1857, and the main road, Jinnah Road, originally known as Mall Road and still commonly referred to as "The Mall", was built. The most significant commercial establishments, the General Post Office, general merchants with European goods, tailors and a millinery, were established opposite the church. Until 1947, access to Mall Road was restricted for "natives" (non-Europeans).

In the summer of 1857, a rebellion against the British broke out. The local tribes of Murree and Hazara, including the Dhund Abbasis and others, attacked the depleted British Army garrison in Murree; however, the tribes were ultimately overcome by the British and capitulated. From 1873 to 1875, Murree was the summer headquarters of the Punjab local government; after 1876 the headquarters was moved to Shimla.

The railway connection with Lahore, the capital of the Punjab Province, via Rawalpindi, made Murree a popular resort for the Punjab officials, and the villas and other houses erected for the accommodation of English families gave it a European aspect. The houses crowned the summit and sides of an irregular ridge, the neighboring hills were covered during the summer with encampments of British troops, while the station itself was filled with European visitors from the plains and travelers to Kashmir. It was connected with Rawalpindi by a service tangas.

It was described in the Gazetteer of Rawalpindi District, 1893–94 as follows:

The sanatorium of Murree lies in north latitude 33° 54′ 30″ and east longitude 73° 26′ 30″, at an elevation of 7,517 feet (2,291 m) above sea level, and contained a standing population of 1,768 inhabitants, which was, however, enormously increased during the [May–November] season by the influx of visitors and their attendant servants and shopkeepers. It is the most accessible hill station in the Punjab, being distant from Rawalpindi only a five hours' journey by tonga dak. Magnificent views are to be obtained in the spring and autumn of the snow-crowned mountains of Kashmir; and gorgeous sunset and cloud effects seen daily during the rains [July–August]. Part of the station, especially the Kashmir end, are also well wooded and pretty.

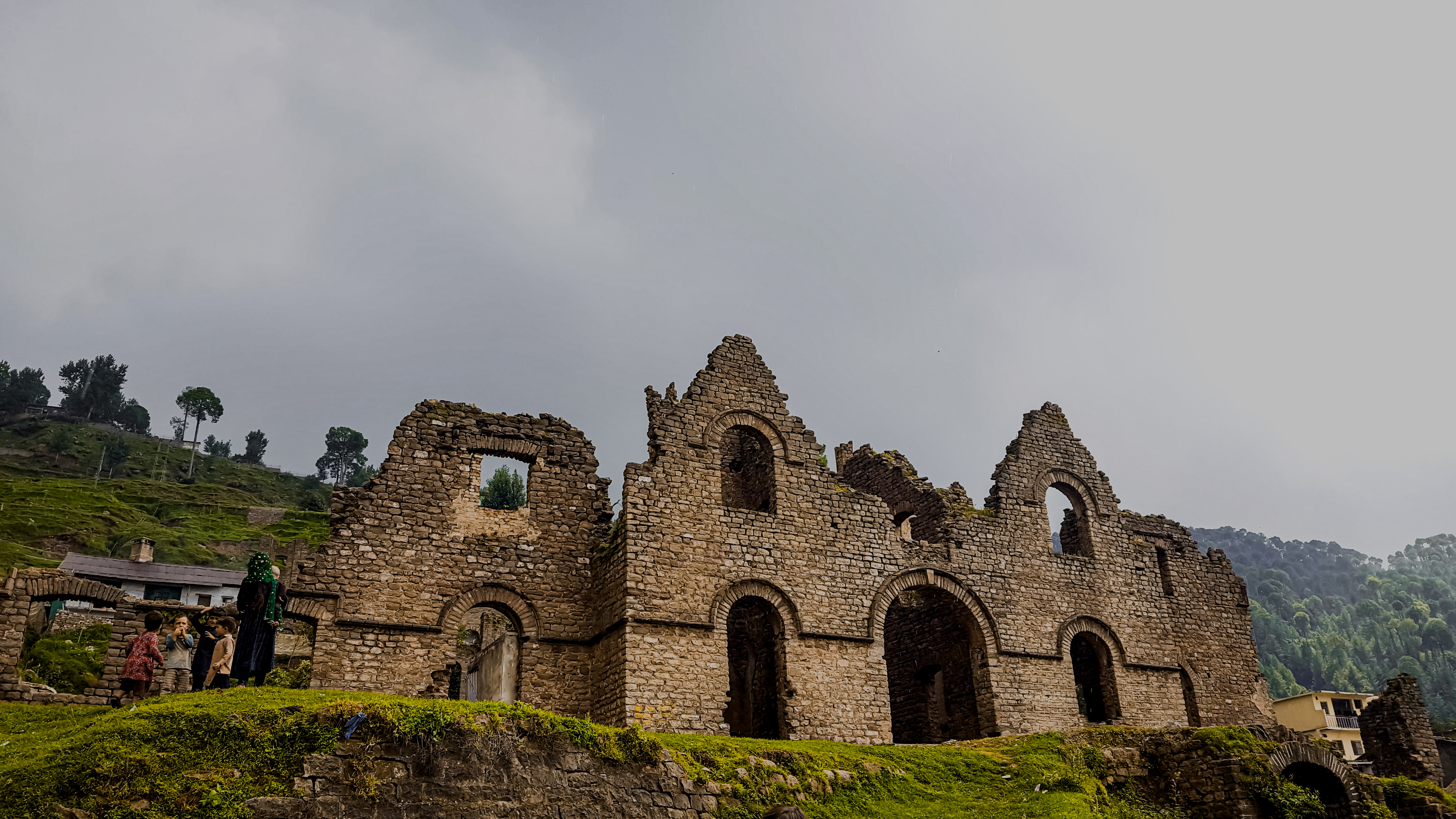
The ruins of the older building of Murree Brewery near Ghora Gali, originally built c. 1861

In 1901, the resident population of the town was 1,844; if summer visitors had been included this could have been as high as 10,000.

In early January 2022, more than 20 people died in their vehicles from hypothermia, after being stranded on the road during a heavy snowstorm in Murree.

== Climate ==
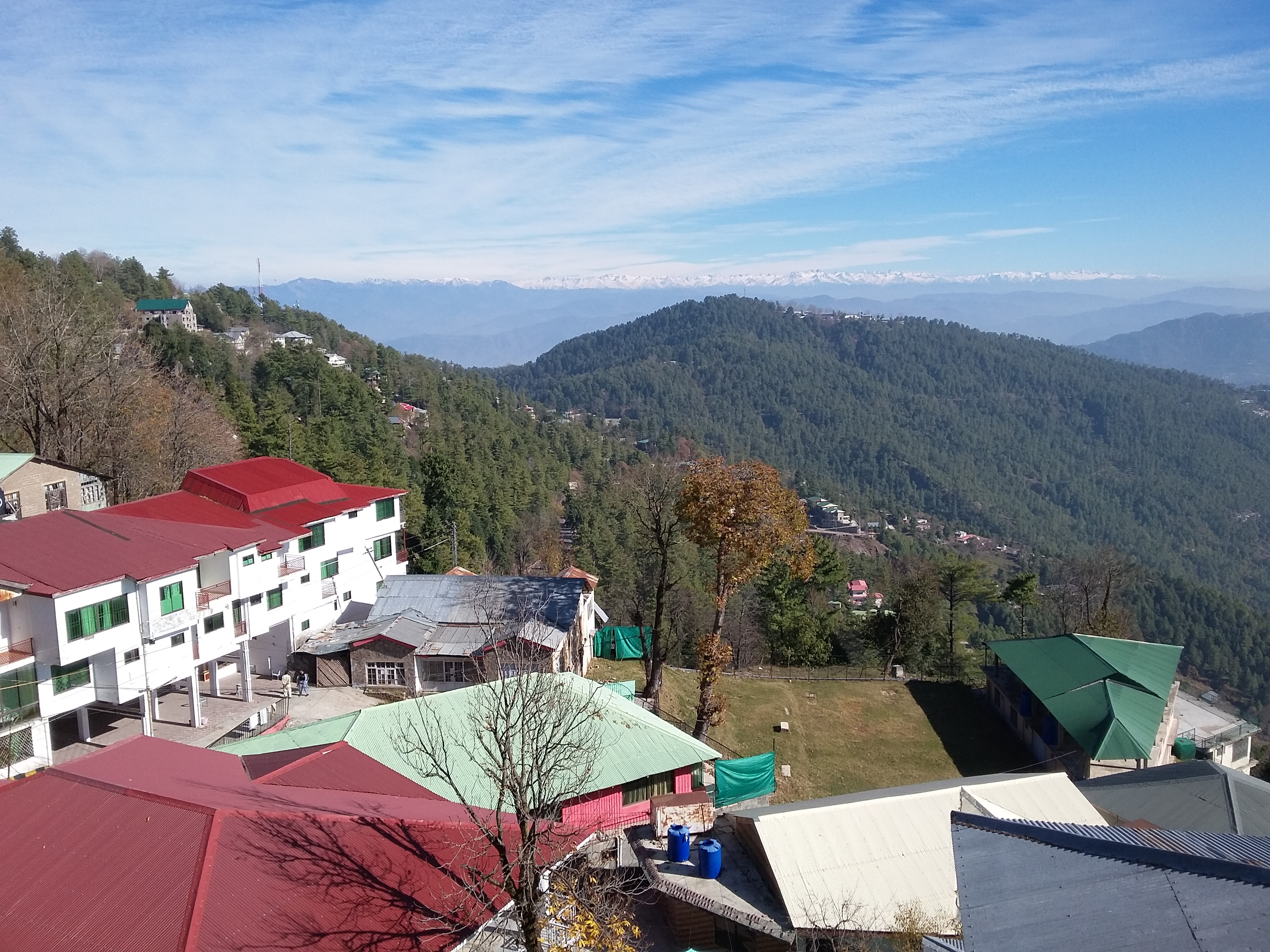
Snow-capped mountains of Kashmir are visible from Murree

Murree features a monsoon-influenced subtropical highland climate (Cwb) under the Köppen climate classification. It is situated in the outer Himalayas, retaining high altitude. This type of area has cold, snowy winters, relatively cool summers with drastically escalated rain, in relation to lower altitudes, and frequent fog. Precipitation is received year round, with two maxima, the first one during winter and the second one at summer, July–August. Total mean precipitation annually is 1,904 mm (75.0 in).

During the summer months (June to August), average daytime temperatures in Murree range from 21 °C (70 °F) to 26 °C (79 °F), while nighttime temperatures usually fall between 15 °C (59 °F) and 18 °C (64 °F). This comfortable temperature range makes Murree an ideal escape from the heat of the surrounding plains.

Winters in Murree are cold and snowy, with temperatures often dropping below freezing. The average high temperature in January is around 8 °C (46 °F), while the average low falls to about −3 °C (27 °F). In February, temperatures rise slightly, with average highs near 9 °C (48 °F) and lows around −2 °C (28 °F). Murree typically receives snowfall from Western Disturbances, usually occurring between late February and early March. Murree receives around 1,590 mm (63 in) of snow per year according to a 13-year data.

Climate data for Murree
Month	Jan	Feb	Mar	Apr	May	Jun	Jul	Aug	Sep	Oct	Nov	Dec	Year
Record high °C (°F)	17.2 (63.0)	19.8 (67.6)	23.0 (73.4)	26.0 (78.8)	32.0 (89.6)	32.2 (90.0)	31.7 (89.1)	27.2 (81.0)	25.6 (78.1)	25.0 (77.0)	22.3 (72.1)	21.1 (70.0)	32.2 (90.0)
Mean daily maximum °C (°F)	8.4 (47.1)	9.6 (49.3)	13.12 (55.62)	19.2 (66.6)	21.7 (71.1)	26.1 (79.0)	23.4 (74.1)	21.4 (70.5)	20.9 (69.6)	18.6 (65.5)	14.5 (58.1)	10.9 (51.6)	17.32 (63.18)
Daily mean °C (°F)	3.7 (38.7)	4.0 (39.2)	8.0 (46.4)	13.2 (55.8)	17.3 (63.1)	20.6 (69.1)	19.1 (66.4)	18.4 (65.1)	17.2 (63.0)	14.3 (57.7)	10.3 (50.5)	6.3 (43.3)	12.7 (54.9)
Mean daily minimum °C (°F)	−3.2 (26.2)	−2.8 (27.0)	1.2 (34.2)	8.2 (46.8)	14.8 (58.6)	17.1 (62.8)	16.7 (62.1)	16.2 (61.2)	13.2 (55.8)	9.2 (48.6)	4.2 (39.6)	1.0 (33.8)	8.0 (46.4)
Record low °C (°F)	−8.4 (16.9)	−10.6 (12.9)	−7 (19)	−3.3 (26.1)	0.6 (33.1)	3.6 (38.5)	8.9 (48.0)	10.0 (50.0)	6.0 (42.8)	1.1 (34.0)	−3.3 (26.1)	−10.5 (13.1)	−10.6 (12.9)
Average precipitation mm (inches)	126.5 (4.98)	145.0 (5.71)	176.8 (6.96)	133.0 (5.24)	91.9 (3.62)	142.0 (5.59)	418.3 (16.47)	336.3 (13.24)	161.5 (6.36)	70.2 (2.76)	32.5 (1.28)	70.3 (2.77)	1,904.3 (74.98)
Source: NOAA

== Administration ==
Location of the Union Council within the Murree region.

The city is the headquarters of Murree Tehsil which originally was a subdivision of Rawalpindi District however in March 2022, the Punjab Government upgraded the administrative status of Murree by posting Hassan Waqar Cheema as the first Additional Deputy Commissioner (ADC). Its status was updated from tehsil to that of a district in October 2022 after the formal appointment of a Deputy Commissioner in November 2022.

At that point city of Murree became the headquarters of Murree District as well as Murree Tehsil, however, the caretaker Punjab Government reversed the status of District in February 2023. The Lahore High Court struck down the move after which the additional charge of the Deputy Commissioner was given to the Rawalpindi Deputy Commissioner.

In September 2023, the Punjab Government posted a Deputy Commissioner in Murree. Agha Zaheer Abbas Sherazi was posted as the second ever Deputy Commissioner on 26 September 2023. The elected government post February 2024 elections decided to stick with the upgraded status of Murree considering its pivotal importance for the tourism industry.

In August 2024, following Murree’s elevation to full district status, the Punjab government made history with two key police appointments, marking significant firsts for the area. Asif Amin Awan was appointed as the District Police Officer (DPO) of Murree. He is the second-ever person to hold that post since the district's creation. Mughees Ahmad Hashmi became the first-ever Chief Traffic Officer (CTO) of Murree, reflecting the government’s initiative to manage traffic more robustly in the growing tourist spot. This move came amid concerns over public order during Independence Day protests and was described as a permanent posting aimed at strengthening law and traffic management in the newly formed district

Localities and union councils of the Murree area:

- Bhurban
- Dewal
- Darya Gali
- Gulehra Gali
- Ghora Gali
- Jhika Gali
- Mohra Sharif
- Potha Sharif
- Sehr Bagla
- Patriata
- Phagwari
- Numbal
- Mussiari

== Demographics ==
Urban Population of Murree Tehsil (2023)
1. Punjabi (26.0%)
2. "Other" (19.4%)
3. Urdu (18.4%)
4. Hindko (17.9%)
5. Pashto (12.5%)
6. Kashmiri (3.05%)
7. Saraiki (1.21%)
8. Sindhi (0.91%)
9. Others (0.67%)

=== Language ===
The population of Murree was 25,186 according to the 2023 census. Of this population, 25.96% spoke Punjabi, 18.36% spoke Urdu, 17.92% spoke Hindko, 12.50% spoke Pashto, 3.05% spoke Kashmiri, 1.21% spoke Seraiki, 0.91% spoke Sindhi, 0.67% spoke minor languages (mostly Balti) and an additional 19.41% identified their mother tongue as not present on the census hence choosing the "Other" category, these are speculated to be local Pahari speakers.

== Military ==
For administrative purposes in the Rawalpindi zone, the military areas of Murree are divided into two separate cantonments; Murree Hills Cantonment and Murree Galis (Kalabagh) Cantonment. Murree houses the headquarters of the 12th Infantry Division of the Pakistan Army, several educational and training institutions, and a combined military hospital established to serve Murree and adjoining garrisons.

The Pakistan Air Force also maintains a base at Lower Topa, near Patriata, with its own military boarding school for boys, PAF Public School Lower Topa.

During the British Raj, in the hot season Murree was the headquarters of the Lieutenant General of the Northern Command. The Commissioner of the Rawalpindi Division and the Deputy Commissioner of Rawalpindi also resided here during part of the season, for which period an Assistant Commissioner was placed in charge of the subdivision consisting of Murree Tehsil. The site was selected in 1850 almost immediately after the annexation of the province, and building operations commenced at once. In 1851 temporary accommodation was provided for a detachment of troops; and in 1853 permanent barracks were erected. The regular garrison generally consisted of two mountain batteries and one battalion of infantry.

== Notable people ==
=== Current ===
- Ansar Abbasi, columnist and journalist
- Francis Younghusband, explorer
- Hania Aamir, actor
- Jonathan Addleton, American diplomat and author
- Kashif Abbasi, journalist and anchor person
- Muhammad Nawaz Abbasi, former justice of the Supreme Court of Pakistan and a former justice of Lahore High Court
- Muhammad Waseem (cricketer)
- Parikshit Sahni, Indian actor
- Sadia Abbasi, politician
- Shahid Khaqan Abbasi, former Prime Minister of Pakistan
- Zafar Mahmood Abbasi, Chief of Naval Staff (CNS) of the Pakistan

=== Deceased ===
- Reginald Dyer (1864 – 1927), British Army officer
- Francis Younghusband (1863 - 1942), British Army officer, explorer and spiritual writer.
- Pir Nazeer Ahmed (1880 – 1960), Islamic Scholar and Sufi Saint
- Bruce Bairnsfather (1887 - 1969), prominent British humorist and cartoonist.
- Gerald Lathbury (1906 – 1978), British Army officer
- Muhammad Riaz Khan Abbasi (d. 1979), Director-General of the Inter-Services Intelligence (ISI)
- Khaqan Abbasi (d. 1988), politician
- Harold Hall (1913 – 2004), cricketer and British civil servant
- Joanna Kelley (1910 - 2003), prison reformer
- Muztar Abbasi (1960 – 2004)
- Raja Ashfaq Sarwar (1954 – 2020), politician
- Pushpinder Singh Chopra (1943 – 2021), aviation expert
- Pir Haroon al Rasheed (1935 – 2022), spiritual leader

== Sister cities ==
- Dujiangyan City, China

== Bibliography ==
- "Murree Town". Imperial Gazetteer of India. Vol. 18. Oxford: Clarendon Press. 1909. p. 42.
- Crossette, Barbara (1998). The Great Hill Stations of Asia. Boulder: Westview Press. pp. 22–42. ISBN 978-08-13-33326-7.
- Gibson, Alexandra L. (2023). "Military Domesticity: Creating Working-Class Worlds in British India". Working-Class Raj: Colonialism and the Making of Class in British India. Cambridge: Cambridge University Press. pp. 76, 82–85. doi:10.1017/9781009356565.004. ISBN 978-10-09-35658-9.
- Kennedy, Dane (1996). The Magic Mountains: Hill Stations and the British Raj. Berkeley: University of California Press. ISBN 978-05-20-20188-0.
- Lee, Harold (2001). Brothers in the Raj: The Lives of John and Henry Lawrence. Karachi: Oxford University Press. ISBN 0-19-579415-X.

Attribution:
