= Ghora Gali =

- Union council
- Interactive map of Ghora Gali
- Country: Pakistan
- Province: Punjab
- District: Murree
- Tehsil: Murree

Population
  - Total: 14,410

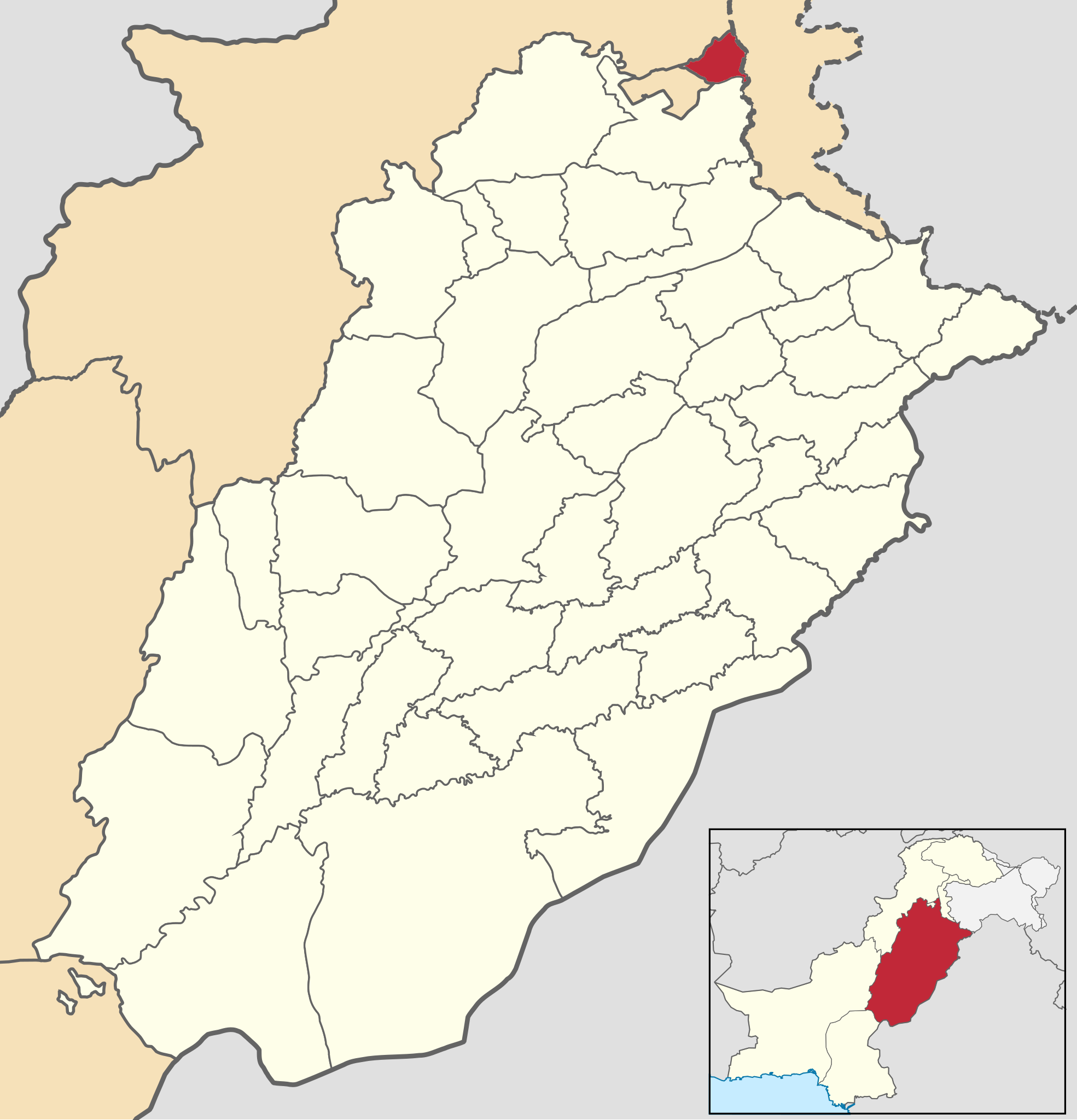
Locator map of Murree district in Punjab, Pakistan

Ghora Gali is one of the tourist mountain resort towns of the Galyat area of northern Pakistan. It has an elevation of 1,691 m (5,548 ft) and is located in the northeastern tip of the Punjab province of Pakistan. Ghora Gali is also a Union council, an administrative subdivision, of Murree Tehsil in Murree District and is located at 33.83°N 73.35°E. According to the 1998 census of Pakistan, it had a population of 14410.

== History ==
=== British Era ===
Ghora Gali served as a resort for British colonialists and troops during the British Raj. In 1860, the Lawrence College was established here originally as an asylum for orphans of British troops killed in the wars. Also in 1860 the Murree Brewery was established here and produced beer for British troops; however, in 1947 following independence from Britain and the ensuing riots during the independence of Pakistan in 1947 the building was destroyed.

== Recreation ==
Ghora Gali now features an 1,100 m-long (3,600 ft) chairlift. It goes from Ghora Gali to Pindi Point.

== See also ==
- Lawrence College Ghora Gali
