= Rawat, Murree =

Rawat
- Union council
- Country: Pakistan
- Province: Punjab
- District: Murree
- Tehsil: Murree

Population
  - Total: 9,172

Rawat is a village and union council of Murree Tehsil in the Murree District of Punjab, Pakistan. It is located in the north of the country in the hilly part of Punjab province, near the border with Khyber Pakhtunkhwa and Kashmir. The tourist resort of Bhurban is located here.

== See also ==
- Rawat Fort
- Riwat
