= Murree Tehsil =

- Tehsil
- Country: Pakistan
- Region: Punjab
- District: Murree District
- Capital: Murree
- Towns: 1
- Union councils: 15

Population (2017)
  - Total: 233,471
- Time zone: UTC+5 (PKT)

Murree Tehsil (Urdu: تحصیل مری) is one of the two Tehsils (i.e. sub-divisions) of Murree District in the Punjab province of Pakistan.

Murree Tehsil is located in the northernmost part of Punjab province where it borders Khyber Pakhtunkhwa. The hill resort city of Murree is the capital city of this area.

== Administration ==
Map showing Administrative subdivisions of Murree Tehsil.

Murree Tehsil is divided into 15 Union Councils. These are:

UC	Name of Union
Uc-49	Murree Urban
Uc-51	Dewal
Uc-52	Phagwari
Uc-53	Potha Sharif
Uc-54	Ghel
Uc-55	Rawat
Uc-56	Sehr Bagla
Uc-57	Darya Gali
Uc-58	Gora Gali
Uc-59	Namble
Uc-60	Mussiari
Uc-61	Angoori
Uc-62	Tret
Uc-63	Charhan
Uc-64	Ban BHUMROTE SAYDAN

Note: The UC prefix is used for administration purposes as Rawalpindi District has a total of 90 Union Councils.

== 2005 earthquake ==
During the earthquake of 2005, 40% of houses in Murree tehsil were damaged or destroyed.

== Demographics ==
According to population census of 2017 Murree has a population of 233,017.
