= Murree District =

District in Punjab, Pakistan

Murree District ضلع مری
- District of Punjab
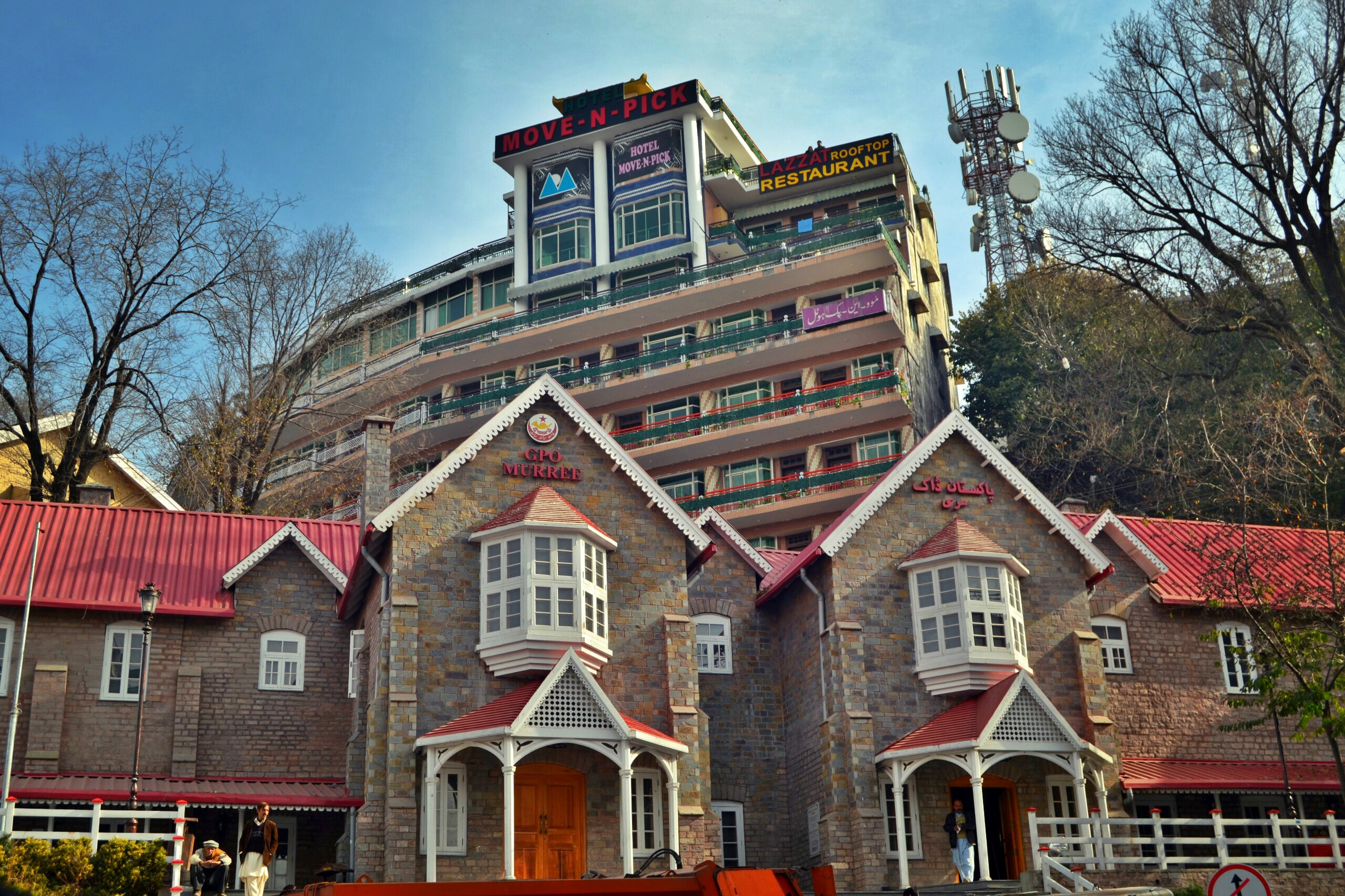
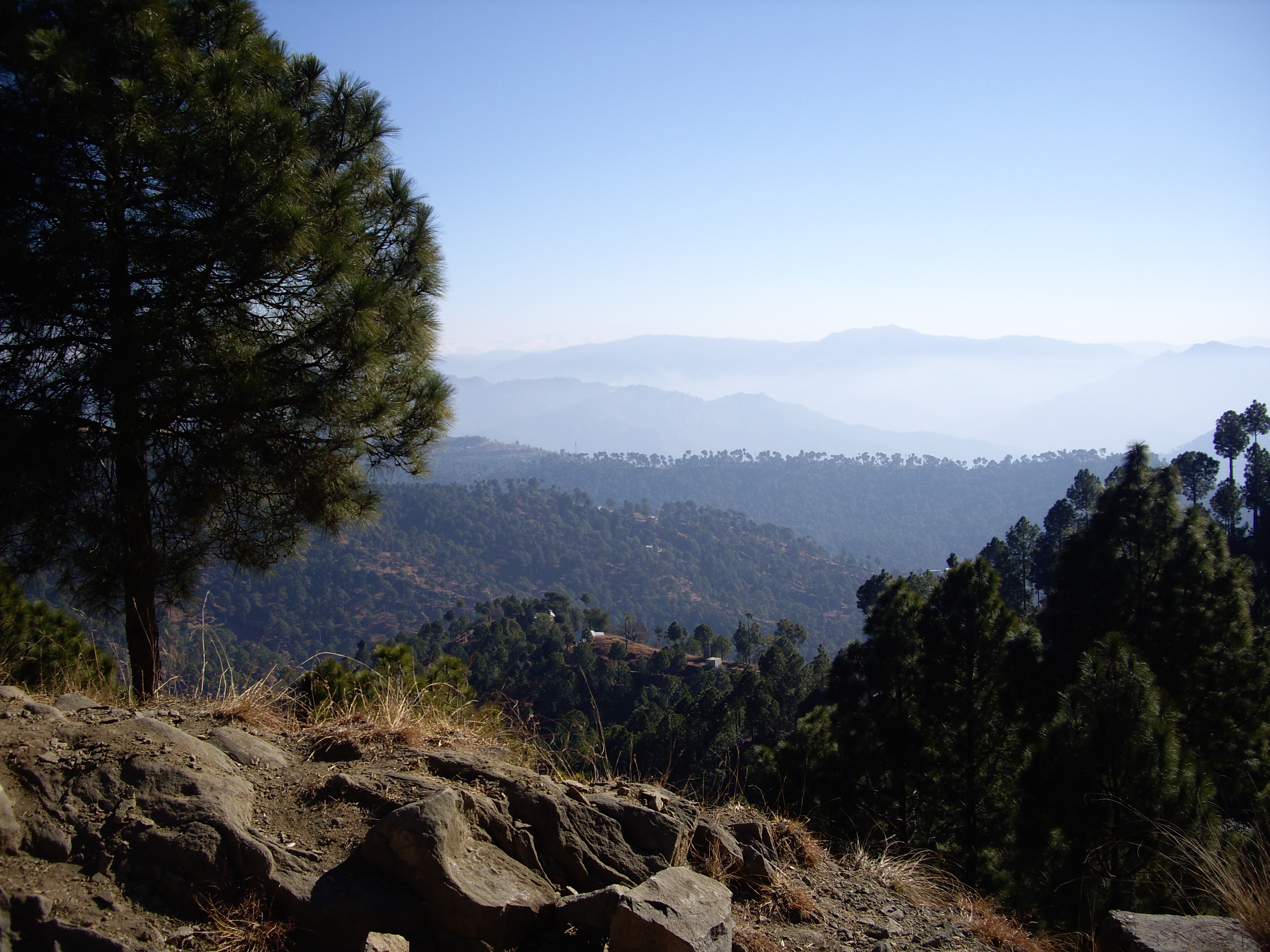
- Top: GPO ( General Post Office) Murree; Bottom: Hills in Kotli Sattian

- Map of Punjab with Murree District highlighted
- Country: Pakistan
- Province: Punjab
- Division: Rawalpindi
- Established: 14 October 2022
- Headquarters: Murree

Government
  - Type: District Administration
  - Deputy Commissioner: Agha Zaheer Abbas Sherazi

Area
  - Total: 738 km^{2} (285 sq mi)

Population (2023)
  - Total: 372,947
  - Density: 505/km^{2} (1,310/sq mi)
  - Urban: 179,444
- Time zone: UTC+5 (PST)
- Area code: 0593
- Number of Tehsils: 2

Murree, (Punjabi and Urdu: ضِلع مری, romanized: Zilā' Marī) is a district within the Rawalpindi Division of Punjab, Pakistan. Located in the Galyat region of northwestern Punjab, it is the northernmost part of the province. The district was created out of Rawalpindi District in 2022 and consists of two tehsils: Kotli Sattian and Murree.

== Administrative division ==
Tehsil	Area (km^{2})	Population (2023)	Density (ppl/km²) (2023)	Literacy rate (2023)	Union Councils
Kotli Sattian	304	120,421	396.12	88.20%	
Murree	434	252,526	581.86	84.79%	15
Total	738	372,947	480	86.01%	

== Demographics ==
=== Population ===
Historical population
Year	Pop.	±% p.a.
1951	…	—
1961	…	—
1972	…	—
1981	…	—
1998	…	—
2017	352,312	—
2023	372,947	+0.95%

As of the 2023 census, Murree district has 66,187 households and a population of 372,947. The district has a sex ratio of 101.18 males to 100 females and a literacy rate of 85.90%: 92.13% for males and 79.52% for females. According to Bureau of statistics data shows District Murree has the Highest Literacy Rate in Punjab. 82,063 (22.19% of the surveyed population) are under 10 years of age. 48,729 (13.07%) live in urban areas.

=== Religion ===
Religion in contemporary Murree District
Religious group	1941		2017		2023	
Religious group	Pop.	%	Pop.	%	Pop.	%
Islam	77,974	97.13%	351,764	99.84%	368,391	99.61%
Hinduism (Note: 1931-1941: Including Ad-Dharmis)	1,629	2.03%	61	0.02%	9	~0%
Sikhism	435	0.54%	—N/a	—N/a	5	~0%
Christianity	19	0.02%	476	0.14%	1,197	0.33%
Others	219	0.28%	11	~0%	229	0.06%
Total Population	80,276	100%	352,312	100%	369,831	100%
Note: 1941 census data is for Murree tehsil of Rawalpindi district, which roughly corresponds to contemporary Murree district. District and tehsil borders have changed since 1941.

Languages of Murree District (2023)
1. Punjabi (43.9%)
2. Hindko (26.0%)
3. 'Other' (20.3%)
4. Urdu (5.73%)
5. Pashto (2.12%)
6. Others (1.96%)

=== Language ===
At the time of the 2023 census, 43.93% of the population spoke Punjabi, while 26.00% identified their mother-tongue as Hindko, 5.73% as Urdu and 2.12% as Pashto. 20.26% of the population spoke a language classified as 'Others'. (Note: 74,927 chose 'Others' in the census, mainly Pahari)

== Places of Interest ==
- Patriata - Popular tourist destination and hill station in Northern Punjab, Pakistan
- Bhurban - Tourist destination with unique flora, and a fauna
- Pindi Point - Mountain view tourist spot
- Kashmir Point - Scenic viewpoint
- Ghora Gali - Tourist mountain resort
- Mohra Sharif - Old Sufi Shrine in Murree

== See also ==
- Tehsils of Punjab, Pakistan
- Districts of Pakistan
  - Districts of Punjab
  - Districts of Sindh
  - Districts of Khyber Pakhtunkhwa
  - Districts of Balochistan, Pakistan
  - Districts of Azad Kashmir
  - Districts of Gilgit-Baltistan
- Divisions of Pakistan
  - Divisions of Punjab, Pakistan
