= Dhund (tribe) =

Tribe of West Punjab, Poonch and Hazara

Dhund Abbasi
ڈھونڈ عباسی

Regions with significant populations
- Pakistan (Punjab, Hazara, Azad Kashmir): Unknown

Religion
- Predominantly Islam

Dhund (ڈھونڈ), also known as Abbasi (عباسی), is a tribe mainly inhabiting Murree in Punjab, and the surrounding areas of Hazara and Azad Kashmir. They natively speak Pahari, Urdu and Hindko languages.

They have adopted several titles such as "Khan", "Sardar" and "Raja".

== Origin ==
According to the anthropologist Hastings Donnan who did fieldwork on the Dhund tribe in the 1980s, the Dhund claim their ancestors to have arrived in Murree and the surrounding region with the invading armies of Muhammad ibn al-Qasim from Arabia in 712 CE, and further claim an Arab descent from Abbas ibn Abd al-Muttalib, the uncle of prophet Muhammad. The tradition of the Arab descent put forwarded by the Dhund has been noted by the British colonial officials since the early 20th century, though with much scepticism. According to Donnan, the tradition of descent from Muhammad's uncle and the usage of the surname Abbasi by the Dhund may suggest "recent Islamization of the name of the group".

Another theory posits an indigenous origins of the tribe, and in the 1881, 1891 and 1901 Censuses of British India the Dhund are recorded to have returned themselves as Rajputs.

== History ==
=== Mughal and Durrani empires ===
During the decline of the Mughal empire, from the late 18th to early 19th century, the Karrals and Dhunds began to assert to themselves some independence of the Gakhars.

According to the Imperial Gazetteer of India (Provincial series) of 1908 "Hazara plain formed part of the Attock governorship, while other parts of the modern District were held by the same Gakhars who played so prominent part in the history of Rawalpindi. When the Mughal dynasty declined and the Afghan peoples from across the Indus grew more aggressive, they found Hazara an easy prey; Gakhar rule had grown weak, and the old families of the Gujars, Kharrals, and Dhunds were losing their vitality. In 1752, Hazara passed definitely under the sway of Ahmad Shah Durrani, The District formed the most convenient route to Kashmir and also a useful recruiting area. Hence the Durranis were at pains to repress disorder, but troubled themselves little about the internal administration or even the revenue payments of the tract.

M. A. Sherring writing in 1879 described the Gukkurs and their neighbours the Dhunds, the Gukkurs were described as living in the south of Hazara District with their chief at Khanpoor and the "territory to the east of that held by the Gukkurs, as far as the Jhelum, is inhabited by the Dhoonds, a rocky country traversed by torrents, in which a wild and hardy people, led by fanatical priests, could, in former times, successfully defy their enemies".

=== Sikh Empire ===
During the latter years of the Sikh Empire the Dhunds rebelled against Gulab Singh, Singh apparently had hunted in vain "for escaped ringleaders" until he came up with the idea of imprisoning the headmen of the neighbourhood – this then allowed him to get his hands on the ringleaders – the British were later to borrow this tactic against the Dhunds in 1857.

In 1837, twenty years prior to the rebellion against the British, rebellion against the Sikh Empire broke out – as the Dhunds, Sattis and other mountain tribes had taken the opportunity of the difficulties faced by the Sikhs at the Battle of Jamrud and the death of Hari Singh Nalwa, to rise in revolt. Their country had been made over to Gulab Singh, and after defeating the Yusufzai he marched with 20,000 men, regulars and irregulars, to crush revolt in the Murree and Hazara hills.

At first the insurgents were successful. Under the leadership of Shamas Khan, a Sudhan, who had been a confidential follower of Raja Dhyan Singh, the whole country had risen, and all the hill forts of the Jammu Raja had fallen into their hands . But Gulab Singh bided his time. He made Kahuta his headquarters, and very soon his promises and bribes brought disunion into the hostile camp. When he had so worked upon the chiefs that none knew whom to trust, he marched into the hills, burning the crops and the villages as he advanced, and offering a reward of a rupee for the head of every man, woman or child connected with the insurgents.

Sir Lepel H. Griffin writing in The Panjab Chiefs described their situation as follows:

"The wretched people, divided among themselves, and confounded by this display of ferocity in their enemy, made little resistance. They were hunted down like wild beasts in every direction and massacred without pity men and women alike. At length Gulab Singh ordered the women to be spared, and kept as prisoners with the army, and there was soon to be seen, following each division, a troop of half-clothed starving females, driven like cattle by day, and at night, penned like cattle in a thorn enclosure, and exposed to the utmost brutality of the soldiery. Only a few hundred of these women, out of several thousand, reached Jammu. These, with the exception of a few of the handsomest reserved for Gulab Singh's Zanana, were sold as slaves."

Griffin notes it "may be an exaggeration, that twelve thousand of the Dhoonds, Sattis and Sudhans perished in this hill campaign." However he goes on to say that it was certain that "some parts of the hills, before well peopled and fertile, became as a desert; men were not left sufficient to till the fields, and a famine the next year swept off many of the miserable survivors of Gulab Singh's revenge."

The Treaty of Amritsar in 1846 would see Gulab Singh become a British ally and recognised as Maharaja of Jammu and Kashmir.

Writing in the aftermath of the Indian Rebellion of 1857, Griffin had the following to say about the fate of Dhunds:

"This terrible punishment was, however, soon forgotten by the Dhoonds. In September, 1857, thinking a time favourable for revolt had arrived, they conspired with the Khurals and their kinsmen of Hazara, and planned an attack on the hill station of Murree. But warning had been received in time of the proposed attack, and when the enemy 300 strong, advanced on the night of the 2nd expecting an easy victory and abundant spoil, they were surprised and driven back, and the next day, on the arrival of troops from Rawalpindi, the Dhoond country to the north west of Murree was entered and eleven villages of the rebels burnt; while fifteen of the ringleaders, who were subsequently captured, suffered death."

=== East India Company rule ===
In 1847 General James Abbott was tasked with the pacification of Hazara, only two tribes stood in the way of total conquest, the hardest to deal with being the Eastern Dhund - Abbott described them as:

"dwelling upon the Jelum in the shadow of the stupendous mountain Maachpoora"

Patrick Vans Agnew sought to negotiate with them but described them as "intractable" and "conceited beyond measure". Despite eventually going to war against them Abbott wrote:

"it cannot but appear that I admire and sympathise with the struggle of free tribes for their liberty, it may be asked how I reconciled myself to the office of an invader... The reader must judge whether I decided rightly or deluded myself into a course inconsistent with such professions."

Abbott had previously written the following about the tribe on 3 June 1847 in his journal,

"Notice came to-day that Dewan Kurrum Chund having disobeyed the most positive prohibitions to move his troops further into the country of the Dhoonds, which Mr. Vans Agnew is actually en route to settle, had met with a shameful defeat from the armed peasantry. He of course himself was not engaged, as it is not the fashion for Sardars to run any personal risk. The event is most unfortunate, for there is no dealing with a people flushed with victory, and the incident is sufficient to cause a general rising."

On 13 June, Abbott, who had halted at Garhi Habibullah, received Vans Agnew and wrote the following about this: "I remained at this spot to enable Mr. Vans Agnew to rejoin me. During his absence all intercourse was cut off between us, for the Dhoonds, with whom that gentleman was negotiating, are too divided amongst themselves to be able to aid in the transmission of letters. I became rather anxious at Mr. Agnew’s protracted absence and silence, but on the evening of the 13th he joined my camp and gave me the particulars of his negotiation. From this it would seem that the Dhoonds and Karlal, two tribes occupying the strongest country of Hazara and separated by blood and hereditary prejudices from the Pathan, Mogul, and Gukka tribes of that country, live in a state of equality, acknowledging at present no ruler and being amenable to no authority that they settle their political dealings by assemblies called jirgas, and from their isolated position amongst wild mountains and fastnesses have little idea of any world but their own petty province. Three Sayyids, Shurff Shah, Syud Shah and Mhaitab Shah by name, exercise some influence over the Dhoonds, but it is limited and uncertain. Amongst the Kurrals, Hussun All is the hereditary chief of one clan and Fatteh Ali Khaun of another The country of the Dhoonds is a small tract lying between the right bank of the Jelum and a huge spur from the predominant summit of Mochpoora, then turning westward by south and occupying the valley of one of the feeders of the Hurro river. The Kurral country lies at the south-western foot of the Mochpoora summit in the corner formed by the Dhoonds of the Jelum and those of the Hurro The country of both tribes is very difficult, and a large force is requisite to give certainty to any attack upon it Mr, Vans Agnew recommends that roads be made along the ridges leading in two directions into the heart of the country so as to render the passage of an army comparatively certain. This appears to me very sound advice of its feasibility I can better judge when I shall know more of the country".

Abbott notes that the "Dhoonds and Kurrals were brought under subjection by the Sikh Government" and that "Hussun Ali, in addition to his jaghir of about 3,500 rupees, was allowed half the actual revenue of the Kurral country for keeping up a force to overawe the people and ensure the Kardar from molestation. It would seem that for this consideration, amounting to about 6,000 rupees, he was expected to exercise this influence over the Dhoonds also, and that until the whole country fell into confusion he was tolerably punctual to his engagement. At present the tribes are in a state of rebellion and the difficulty will be to cause Hussun Ali to make the proper submission. Should he do so, I am of opinion that he should be reinstated in his former possessions (the chowth) as the simplest, and indeed only, method, not involving loss of controlling so strong a country. He has not come in to Mr. Vans Agnew, but has sent messages. It appears that he is extremely suspicious. The Syuds of the Dhoonds were conciliated by the Sikh Government with a jaghir and a yearly pension of 500 rupees, but this salary was extended to only two of the houses, and the third, Mhaitab Shah, was not provided for. He has come in to Mr. Agnew and lent him all the aid in his power, and I think it will be wise to follow Mr. Agnew’s suggestion and give him a salary of 250 rupees a year from the revenue of the Dhoond country on their return to allegiance."

Abbott then noted at "the suggestion of Mr. Vans Agnew, in which I concur, I have paid in advance to the Syuds, Syud Shah and Shuiff Shah, one half of their yearly pension commencing with the rain crops of the current year not yet collected and given them a purwana assuring them that, on the return to allegiance of the Dhoonds, their salary shall be punctually paid them. I have also granted a purwana to the Syud Mhaitab Shah promising him a salary of 250 rupees yearly on return of the Dhoonds to allegiance.

On 10 July, Abbott received a letter from Khanpur advising him of an attack of banditry by Ata Ali. On 12 July, Abbott with the assistance of Reechpal Singh attempted to ensnare him at Khanpur; however, Ali and his men managed to retreat. Abbott wrote of the situation "it is difficult to proceed summarily against Ata Ali without bringing on prematurely a campaign with the Dhoonds, upon whose country he falls back."

Abbott wrote that "the wildest mountains commence at this point and run back into the still wilder country of the Dhoonds and Kurrals, who are ever ready to assist in mischief, and this renders the protection of the mountain villages difficult."

On 20 September 1847 while undertaking Revenue Settlement, Abbott noted that the "Dhoond zumeendars of Dunna came in to-day, and I purpose sending a party immediately to rebuild that mountain fort, retaining here as hostages half the zumeendars. 'I he disposition of the remainder of the Dhoonds remains to be seen. They have not yet made their submission. Their country is a mass of lofty mountains covered with jungle and cannot be safely entered by small detachments, but the possession of Dunna is very important and will simplify operations should such prove necessary.

On 4 November 1847 at Sherpoor, Abbott wrote: "Several Dhoond zumeendars ot the purgunnah Charrian came in this day. But the Dhoonds of Daiwul show no disposition to submit. I have therefore desired Sirdar Jhundur Singh to march toward Dunna, there to join or to support me as may be."

6 and 7 November Abbott notes that Singh was unable to advance by the Dunna route: "I wrote the Sirdar begging him to hasten to Dunna with his detachment of about 1,000 bayonets and two guns either by the Sutora or the Khaunpoor road"

Abbott had wanted to conquer the area without force he noted: "I have sent to summon the Dhoonds of the Jelum some days ago But no answer has been received, and it seems doubtful whether they will submit without force I wished to have advanced into their country without halt, but the corps I am collecting are not sufficiently strong to warrant such a move, nor will their carriage be complete in less than two or three days. I have therefore resolved to await a junction with Sirdar Jhundur Singh’s force and move with it in parallel columns, occupying the higher and the lower roads.

On 8 and 9 November, Abbott who was encamped at Lora awaiting supplies wrote: "It is absolutely necessary to have a considerable depot at Dunna. No answer has arrived from the Dhoonds of the Jelum. I have intimated to them the painful necessity I shall be under to withdraw all interference on their behalf and to allow the Sikh army to burn and destroy if they continue in rebellion, and I have represented to them the misery they will thus entail upon their houseless families when the snow lies heavy on the ground.

According to Lepel Griffin, Budh Singh assisted "Major Abbott in the Dhund mountains, where he and his men encamped in the snow for many days without a murmur."

By 15 November, Abbott's threats along with the men and arms he had at this command seemed to have made the Dhunds submit to him, however he was still cautious for he noted in his journal that day: "I wrote yesterday evening to Lieutenant Nicholson in charge of Sind Sagui, accepting his offer of the Infantry corps remaining in Chuch, which I have begged him to provide with hill carriage and to station at Khaunpoor as a reserve in case of hostilities, for although the Dhoonds have made their submission, they are reputed a slippery race, and when the snow falls they may yet be tempted to mischief, in which case without a reserve I should scarcely be able to maintain my communications and make sure of my supplies in so deep a tract of rugged mountains I ordered Colonel Baboo Pandah to march his corps to Charnan to re-build the fort there, and as its destruction was accidental, the magazine having exploded, I have ordered that the zumeendars be paid regularly for the work, whereas at Dunna, Mari and Nara I obliged them to renew what they had destroyed, giving them only rations."

Things then seem to settle and the tribe did not rise against the East India Company during the winter months, however the Second Anglo-Sikh War breaks out in April 1848 following the murder of Vans Agnew in Multan. On 11 May 1848, Abbott receives information from the "Dunna Thannadar" that "the first symptoms of disaffection in those mountains" had begun. "The Kurrals had sent to the Dhoonds, telling them not to pay their rents as the Sikh Empire was over in Mooltan. The country is very strong and the weakened field force of Huzara could not spare a column sufficient for its subjection."

=== 1857 Revolt ===
In May 1857, a revolt against British rule in India began and started to spread, areas including Delhi and Bengal were caught up in this violence. By the end of August 1857, many of the British troops who had been stationed in hill stations like Murree had left to join the attack on Delhi and bring the city under British control; the decision to send troops to Delhi reduced Murree to a still more defenceless state. However, Delhi still held out against the British and encouraged by this Dhund tribesmen tried to seize Murree by simultaneously rising on every side and crowding up the nearer hill-sides threatening destruction of the station. Several of the Mussulman table-servants were in league with the hill-men, and for some hours the danger to Murree became imminent.

According to the 1857 Punjab Mutiny Report, the attack failed due to the fidelity of one of Lady Lawrence's personal attendants, named Hakim Khan, himself an influential man of one of the tribes that had risen. The loyalty of Hakim was described in the report as "the means, under God, of saving Murree." Alerted to the danger the British organised defences, and quickly rallied volunteers commanded by Major Luard of the 55th NI and Captain HC Johnstone of the 5th N.I. A cordon of sentries surrounded the station and the three weakest points were held in some force; so the Dhoonds (the distinctive name of these disaffected hillmen), stealing up the hill-sides in the dead of night found the whole station waiting for them.

After a few hours of skirmishing the Dhonds retreated with the loss of two or three of their men who had come within musket range of the British. The British however were to learn that the rebellion was wider than just the Dhonds. After the repulse of the Dhoonds, it was found that the conspiracy affect many more clans and a much wider extent of country than had been suspected. It had reached far into Hazara and nearly down to Rawalpindi; and, excepting the Khurrul insurrection in Multan, was by far the most extensive rebellion that had occurred in the Punjab during that year.

The British also convicted and executed two Hindustani doctors for being involved in the plot. They had been educated in government institutions, were practising in Murree and employed by the government. The British suspected that the Dhunds were expecting support from their Hindustani allies, so in addition to the doctors several domestic servants were seized and punished. An urgent request was sent to troops in Hazara to reinforce Murree and Major Beecher sent every available man from Abbottabad to Murree - however the British troops in Murree had managed to secure the station and beat off the attack before the arrival of reinforcements.

However although the British had managed to repulse the attack on Murree town, two neighbouring heights were held by the Dhund tribesmen. The British in Murree were unable to send men to tackle the tribesmen in the hills as these were needed for the defence of Murree. For the whole of 2 September 1857 the heights around Murree were held by the tribesmen. It wasn't until the 3rd of September with the arrival of the reinforcements that the tribesmen were repulsed from the hills.

Sardar Sherbaz Khan Abbasi, also known as Baz Khan, was a leader of the Dhund Abbasi tribe of Northern Punjab during the time of the British Raj. He was the son of Fateh Noor Khan - reportedly an influential member of the tribe.

Sherbaz Khan planned to attack the British settlement of Murree in July 1857 during the uprising against British colonial rule - with a force of 300 men, but his plans were leaked to the British and his plans were thwarted, and he was captured by the British. He was subsequently tried, sentenced and hanged him placed in front of cannons and shot to bits.

According the Punjab Mutiny report however, the reinforcement themselves were almost ambushed. They had to cross difficult country full or morasses and defiles. The Khurrals laid an ambush to cut them off, but providence saved them. The road on which the trap was laid became impassable from the rains. The force turned off, and not till it had passed the spot, did it learn the greatness of the peril from which it had been delivered.

Ali Bahadar, a Karlal chief, who had remained loyal to Abbott during the Sikh Wars (despite some of his near relatives joining with Chatar Singh) also assisted the EIC during the Murree rebellion, in Chiefs and Families of Note by Major Massy - the Major wrote: "In the Mutiny he and his brothers, Ata Mahomed and Ali Gohar, proceeded with their armed retainers and clansmen to Murree on the first intimation of the Dhund outbreak, and rendered faithful service until they were allowed by the Commissioner to return to their homes. Ali Bahadar was awarded a cash allowance of Rs. 200 per annum, and the three brothers received valuable khilats in public Darbar."

Nawab Khan, the great-grandson of Tanoli chief Suba Khan, assisted Major Abbott after the annexation. At the time styling himself as Chief of eastern Tanawal. Prior to the Dhund rebellion he had been in Multan at the head of a body of horsemen serving Edwardes throughout the Siege. Massy writes of how he "was again forward in assisting at the suppression of the Dhund rising in the neighbourhood of Murree in 1857, losing his eyesight from the effects of exposure. He was rewarded with a perpetual jagir of Rs. 1,780." Massy writes this inheritances was then passed to his son who held "revenue assignments valued at Rs. 2,779 in Shingri, Paswal, Serai Niamat Khan and some neighbouring villages."

Once Murree had been garrisoned with extra troops and supplies of food, the British then exacted their revenge, rebellious villages were burnt, cattle confiscated and men seized.

According to the Punjab Report Mutiny report, "Mr. Thornton, the Commissioner, was at the headquarters of this district at the commencement of the outbreak. He states that as soon as the news from the North West Provinces got abroad amongst the people, some of the well-disposed came and expressed to him their unfeigned sorrow at the prospect of the certain extinction of our rule. They considered the struggle a hopeless one for our nation. Hindoostanee emissaries eagerly fostered this idea amongst the country folk, assuring them that the King of Delhi had sent directions to his loyal subjects to send all the English down the Indus without hurting them, and that the deportation of the Hindoostanees from the Punjab" was simply the English carrying out the command of the Mughal Emperor

The Punjab Mutiny Report goes on to say, plots were hatched "which culminated on the night of the 2d September, when the station of Murree was attached by 300 men. The fidelity of one of Lady Lawrence's personal attendants, himself an influential man of one of the tribes which had risen". This skirmish constituted the whole of the fighting; but two bodies of the enemy, of 100 men each, held two neighbouring heights during the whole of the 2d of September, and as there was no knowing how far the confederacy had spread. The station of Murree could not be weakened by sending men to drive them away. On the evening of the 3d the Commissioner arrived with a reinforcements from below. Supplies of food, which had been providently ordered to be bought in Rawul Pindee and sent up, began to arrive; the country was scoured, rebellious villages were burnt, their cattle harried and their men seized; 27 men were punk-lied, of whom 15 suffered death. The smoke of the 11 villages which were destroyed was seen far by a party of Khurrals which were coming out to renwew the attack, while the bright and unscathed houses of Murree showed plainly that no burning had occurred there. The rebel force, slunk off disheartened, and their tribe professed deep loyalty, but it was known to be second in ill-feeling only to the Dhoonds who made the attack."

The report then describes how the actions of the Dhunds were part of a larger movement how they appeared to have allies in the city of Murree itself (which was a target of the attack: "After the repulse of the Dhoonds, it was found that the conspiracy affected many more clans, and a much wider extent of country than had been suspected. It reached far into Huzara, and nearly down to Rawul Pindee, and excepting the Khurral insurrection in Mooltan, was by far the most extensive combination that has occurred in the Punjab during the year. Treachery was added to violence; two Hindoostanee native doctors in Government employ, educated at Government institutions, and then practising in Murree, were found guilty of being sharers in the plot; they were both executed. There seems no doubt that the hill men reckoned much on the support and directions they were to receive from their Hindoostance friends in the station, and several of the domestic servants were seized and punished for complicity. Several, also, fled from justice, and are yet at large. Two of the ringleaders in the raid are free through the connivance of their country."

On the 6th of September Captain Hardinge arrived in the area "and without any opposition brought his men under the walls of the fort of Dhunna (within a few miles of Murree), on the evening of the 6th September" Once at Dhunna he communicated with Mr. Thornton.

The Punjab Mutiny report goes on to say by "that time the danger had gone by; the rebels who had gathered round Murree had been dispersed, and many of them followed up and captured; the disaffection appeared but partial, and confined to a few of the nearest villages, as the peers of Plasseh, jageerdars of Huzara, the most influential men in the Dhoond country, had been summoned, and had repaired with their followers to Murree the morning after the attack, with the principal Mullicks around, and had assisted in burning the villages, and seizing the cattle of the rebels."

The report also seems to indicate that perhaps a majority of the Dhunds did not oppose the EIC for it continues: "Those of the Dhoonds, about the fort of Dhunna, had also reported themselves there. Situated as Murree is, in the extensive country of the Dhoonds, who boast of the armed thousands they can assemble, the great danger to be apprehended was a general and extensive combination, and most serious to the peace of the Punjab would have been the moral effect of any disaster at a station crowded with English ladies and children."

The troops then stayed in position for a while to gauge local feeling: "To make sure of the feeling of the country while in a controlling position, the troops continued till the 15th September at Murree, when the detachment of the regiment returned towards Huzara by Rawul Pindee, while the irregular levies who, with the chiefs I sent, had been very useful in dragging forth the fugitives from their a treats in the hills, came back through the Dhoond country by Beerungullee, finding all peaceable and well-disposed in that direction."

The mutiny report describes how the news of the fall of Delhi came and then various tribal chiefs ("mullicks") were sent with military escorts to "arrest the fugitive Dhoonds from Murree".

"When it should really be believed that fortune had returned to our standard, I knew that the fate of the fugitive Dhoonds would resemble that of the 55th Regiment. They would be delivered up or driven out, if they really were lurking there, so after some pause, I poured into the country all the levies I could command, amounting to some 300 men, in five principal bands, forming a ring round the base of Murree, guarding the River Jhelum, and cutting off еscape."

This was a reference to the 55th Regiment of the Bengal Native Infantry, most of these regiments had mutinied against the British and subsequently were disarmed or punished - the 1857 rebellion itself had begun when a member of the Bengal Native Infantry attacked British soldiers over 1,000 miles away in Barrackpore.

The Mutiny report identifies Baz Khan: "Of the villages whose inhabitants were present, and engaged in the attack, only one hamlet of 10 or 12 families, called Bhuttean, belonged to Huzara, and they were nearly related to Baz Khan, and other head men of Muthole, in the Rawul Pindee district, who had originated the whole plot, and were the most native of the assailants."

These Bhutteean men were apparently "concealed in the Huzara Dhoond villages of Sele and Myra", the British then took inspiration from Maharaja Goolab Singh, he had initially struggled to find Dhund ringleaders until he began imprisoning the headmen of each neighbourhood.

Major Becher wrote in the mutiny report: I "called into Hurreepoor the mullicks of Seer, Myra and Nuggree, and told them they must remain there till the Bhutteean fugitives were discovered, and until I was convinced that no others were also secreted by their connivance."

"I again sent ray two former deputies to Sirdar Hussun Ally Khan, ordering him to stay at Bagun with them; and to secure their valuable influence, I called in the peers of Plasseh; the result was, that all the Bhutteean fugitives were unconditionally made over by the Muliick of Myra, whose daughter is married to the principal man. The other Dhoond fugitives, rejected everywhere, have mostly been arrested in their own homes by the Pindee police or my own, and but very few now remain at large. The confederation, whatever it may have been, has been entirely broken up; and of those proved to have been actually engaged, some have suffered death, and very many have been imprisoned by the authorities of Ravvul Pindee, their cattle confiscated, and their villages fired."

Becher wrote among "those put to death were some Hindoostanees of Murree" who he blamed for inciting the hill tribes, Becher also wrote that promptly cracking down on the Dhond rebels prevented more serious issues arising "and undoubtedly had it not been promptly managed, or had it been supported and followed up by the people of Hazara, it would hove been a far more serious matter, occurring as it did at a time of great weakness in troops."

=== British Raj ===
With the end of Company rule and the formal creation of the British Raj, some Dhunds went on to serve in the British Indian army. In Sir George Fletcher MacMunn's 'Armies of India', published in 1911 - a Dhund Subadar is included in the list of illustrations - his name and rank (written in Urdu text in the illustration) was Subedar Jehandad Khan, he was painted by Major Alfred Crowdy Lovett of the Gloucestershire Regiment.

Other Dhunds such as Mansabdar Khan and his son Raja Sikander held the role of Tahsildar during British rule - essentially becoming part of the administration of their areas.

British war records also reveal soldiery from the area having taken part in World War I, names listed on the Basra Memorial include:

Name	Relation	Home location
Sepoy Mansabdar Khan	Son of Mardan Khan	Mauri, Murree, Rawalpindi, Punjab
Sepoy Ali Bahadur	Son of Fateh Khan	Thirkot, Murree, Rawalpindi, Punjab
Sepoy Gulab Khan	Son of Atar Khan	Ghuati, Murree, Rawalpindi, Punjab
Subadar Muhammad Zaman	Son of Kairn Khan	Kehror, Murree, Rawalpindi, Punjab

Note: Sepoy Mansabdar Khan is a different individual to the Mansabdar Khan of Phulgran.
All names are listed on Panel 47 of the Basra Memorial, these men all died on 22 November 1915 which is the date the Battle of Ctesiphon was launched by the British against Ottoman forces. Although British-Indian forces initially caused the Ottoman forces to retreat, Lieutenant General Nureddin of the Ottoman Empire reinforced his lines, and the British-Indian forces were stopped.

== Notable people ==
- Sardar Sherbaz Khan Abbasi, Freedom Fighter and Tribal leader against British Raj
- Shahid Khaqan Abbasi, Prime Minister of Pakistan
- Sardar Abdul Qayyum Khan Abbasi, Prime Minister and president of Azad Kashmir
- Sardar Attique Ahmed Khan Abbasi, Prime Minister of Azad Kashmir
- Abdul Rashid Abbasi, Interim President of Azad Kashmir
- Muhammad Riaz Khan Abbasi, Director-General of the Inter-Services Intelligence (ISI) Pakistan
- Zahirul Islam Abbasi, Brigadier General and Intelligence Officer Pakistan Army
- Sardar Mehtab Ahmed Khan Abbasi, Governor and Chief Minister of the Khyber Pakhtunkhwa
- Murtaza Javeed Abbasi, FMR Deputy Speaker National Assembly of Pakistan
- Muhammad Hanif Abbasi, Member of the National Assembly of Pakistan
- Raja Usama Sarwar Abbasi, Member of the National Assembly of Pakistan
- Sardar Rajab Ali Khan Abbasi, Member of the Provincial Assembly of Khyber Pakhtunkhwa
- Muhammad Javeed Abbasi, Member of the Provincial Assembly of Khyber Pakhtunkhwa
- Nazir Ahmed Abbasi, Member of the Provincial Assembly of Khyber Pakhtunkhwa
- Riffat Abbasi, Member of the Provincial Assembly of Punjab
- Sadia Khaqan Abbasi, Barrister and Member of the Senate of Pakistan
- Sardar Sajid Iqbal Abbasi, Member-elect of the Azad Jammu and Kashmir Legislative Assembly, from Pakistan
- Nisaran Abbasi, Member of the Azad Jammu and Kashmir Legislative Assembly and Advisor to the Prime Minister
- Mustafa Bashir Abbasi, Member-elect of the Azad Jammu and Kashmir Legislative Assembly, from Pakistan
- Khaqan Abbasi, Pakistan Air Force officer and later Minister
- Javeed Iqbal Abbasi, Member of the National Assembly of Pakistan
- Muhammad Nawaz Abbasi, Justice of the Supreme Court and Lahore High Court of Pakistan
- Raja Muhammad Shafqat Khan Abbasi, Member of the Provincial Assembly of Punjab

== See also ==
- Murree rebellion of 1857
- Hazara region
- Tribes and Clan of the Pothohar Plateau
