= NA-51 Murree-cum-Rawalpindi =

Constituency of the National Assembly of Pakistan

- Constituency for the National Assembly of Pakistan
- Region: Kahuta and Kallar Syedan Tehsils of Rawalpindi District; Murree District
- Electorate: 590,372

Current constituency
- Created: 1970 (as NW-26 Rawalpindi-I)
- Party: Pakistan Muslim League (N)
- Member: Raja Usama Sarwar

NA-51 Murree-cum-Rawalpindi (این اے-51، مری-کم-راولپنڈی) is a constituency for the National Assembly of Pakistan.

== Area ==
- Murree District
- Kahuta Tehsil
- Kallar Syedan Tehsil

Punjab (National and Provincial Assembly Constituencies)

== Members of Parliament ==
=== 1970–1977: NW-26 Rawalpindi-I ===
Election	Member	Party
1970	Khursheed Hassan Mir	PPP

=== 1977–2002: NA-36 Rawalpindi-I ===
Election	Member	Party
1977	Habib Khan	PPP
1985	Khaqan Abbasi	Independent
1988	Shahid Khaqan Abbasi	Independent
1990	Shahid Khaqan Abbasi	IJI
1993	Shahid Khaqan Abbasi	PML-N
1997	Shahid Khaqan Abbasi	PML-N

=== 2002–2018: NA-50 Rawalpindi-I ===
Election	Member	Party
2002	Ghulam Murtaza Satti	PPPP
2008	Shahid Khaqan Abbasi	PMLN
2013	Shahid Khaqan Abbasi	PMLN

=== 2018–2023: NA-57 Rawalpindi-I ===
Election	Member	Party
2018	Sadaqat Ali Abbasi	PTI

=== 2024–present: NA-51 Murree-cum-Rawalpindi ===
Election	Member	Party
2024	Raja Usama Sarwar	PML(N)

== Detailed results ==
=== Election 2002 ===
From 2002 NA-36 Becom NA-50 (Rawalpindi-I) (a) Murree Tehsil (b) Kotli Sattian Tehsil (c) Kahuta Tehsil and (d) Choha Khalsa Circle 6 Union Councils of Kallar Syedan Tehsil NA 50 Rawalpindi-I Pakistan National Assembly Seat Winners & History

General elections were held on 10 October 2002. Ghulam Murtaza Satti of Pakistan Peoples Party won by 74,259.

NA-50 Rawalpindi-I
Party	Candidate	Votes	%
PPP	Ghulam Murtaza Satti	74,259	44.0
PML(N)	Shahid Khaqan Abbasi	63,797	37.8
MMA	Muhammad Sufyan Abbasi	29,331	17.4
Others	Others	1,320	0.8
Valid ballots		168,707	98.4
Rejected ballots		2,742	1.6
Turnout		171,449	47.8
Majority		10,462	6.2
PPP win (new seat)			

=== Election 2008 ===
General elections were held on 18 February 2008. Shahid Khaqan Abbasi won this seat with 99,988 votes.

General election 2008: NA-50 Rawalpindi-I
Party	Candidate	Votes	%	±%
PML(N)	Shahid Khaqan Abbasi	99,988	48.45	
PPP	Ghulam Murtaza Satti	77,978	37.79	
PML(Q)	Javed Iqbal Satti	28,188	13.66	
Independent	Masood Ahmad Abbassi	202	0.10	
Turnout		210,938	52.27	
Total valid votes		206,356	97.83	
Rejected ballots		4,582	2.17	
Majority		22,010	10.66	
Registered electors		403,566		
PML(N) gain from PPP				

=== Election 2013 ===
General elections were held on 11 May 2013. Shahid Khaqan Abbasi of PML-N won by 133,906 votes and became the member of National Assembly.

General election 2013: NA-50 Rawalpindi-I
Party	Candidate	Votes	%	±%
PML(N)	Shahid Khaqan Abbasi	134,439	54.42	
PTI	Sadaqat Ali Abbasi	47,210	19.11	
PPP	Ghulam Murtaza Satti	45,203	18.30	
Others	Others (ten candidates)	20,195	8.17	
Turnout		254,363	57.49	
Total valid votes		247,047	97.12	
Rejected ballots		7,316	2.88	
Majority		87,229	35.31	
Registered electors		442,458		
PML(N) hold				

=== Election 2018 ===
General elections were held on 25 July 2018.

General election 2018: NA-57 Rawalpindi-I
Party	Candidate	Votes	%	±%
PTI	Sadaqat Ali Abbasi	136,249	41.7	▲22.7
PML(N)	Shahid Khaqan Abbasi	124,703	38.2	▼16.4
TLP	Javed Akhtar Abbasi	27,693	8.5	▲8.5
PPP	Mehreen Anwar Raja	24,081	7.4	▼10.8
Others	Others (four candidates)	9,966	3.1	
Turnout		326,600	55.3	
Rejected ballots		3,908	1.2	
Majority		11,546	3.5	
Registered electors		590,372		
PTI gain from PML(N)				

=== Election 2024 ===
General elections were held on 8 February 2024. Raja Usama Sarwar won the election with 149,400 votes.

General election 2024: NA-51 Murree-cum-Rawalpindi
Party	Candidate	Votes	%	±%
PML(N)	Raja Usama Sarwar	149,400	42.76	▲4.58
PTI	Muhammad Latasob Satti (Note: Filed nomination papers as PTI candidate but ECP allowed him to run as an Independent)	113,911	32.60	▼9.12
TLP	Javed Akhtar Abbasi	32,006	9.16	▲0.68
PPP	Mehreen Anwar Raja	16,426	4.70	▼2.67
Independent	Mehmood Shoukat	14,838	4.25	N/A
JI	Muhammad Sufyan	10,076	2.88	N/A
Others	Others (twenty-one candidates)	12,711	3.64	
Turnout		357,847	52.53	▼2.79
Total valid votes		349,368	97.63	
Rejected ballots		8,479	2.37	
Majority		35,489	10.16	
Registered electors		681,236		
PML(N) gain from PTI				

== See also ==
- NA-50 Attock-II
- NA-52 Rawalpindi-I
