= Shahid Khaqan Abbasi =

Prime Minister of Pakistan from 2017 to 2018

- شاہد خاقان عباسی
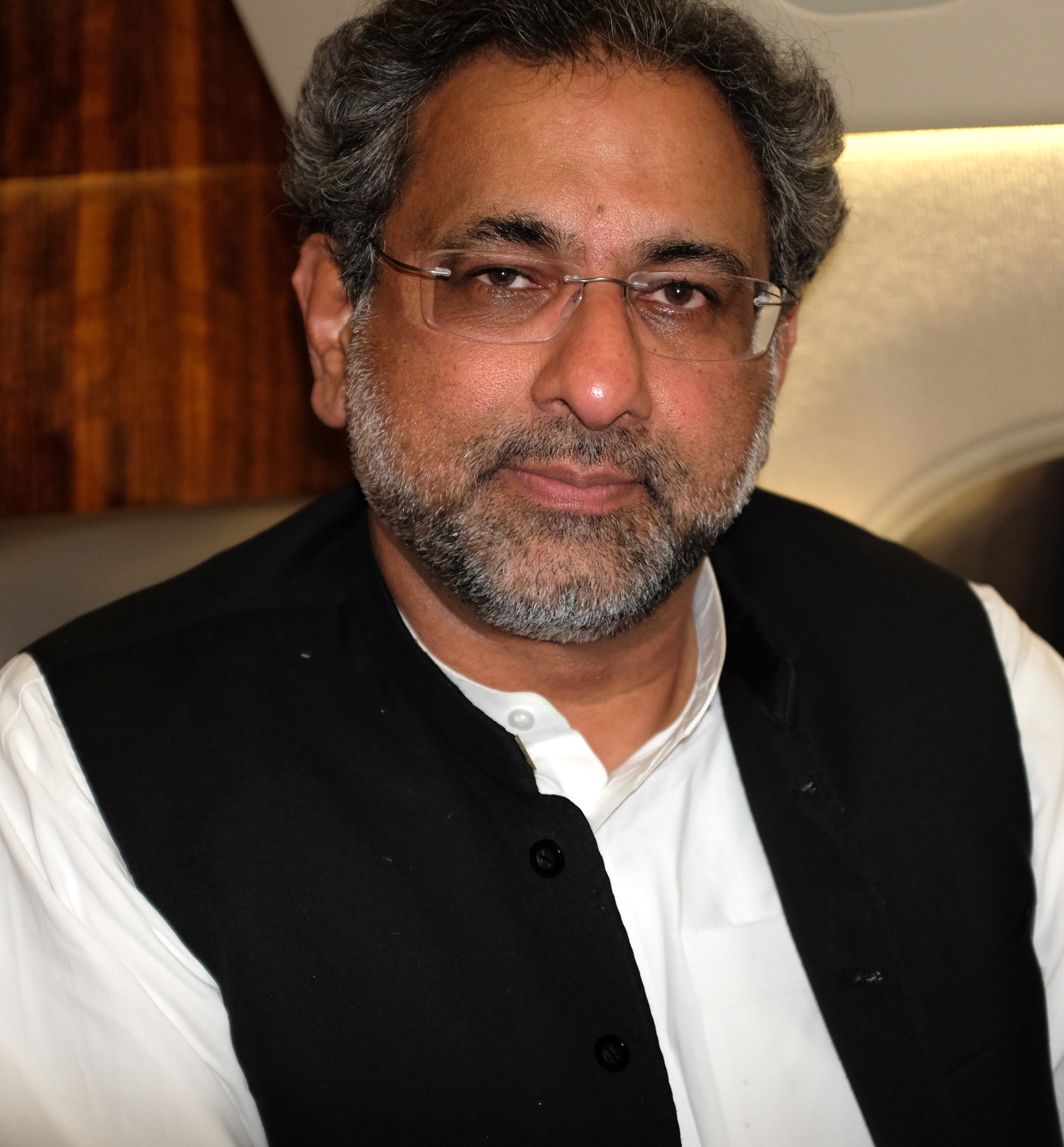
- Abbasi in 2017

18th Prime Minister of Pakistan
- In office 1 August 2017 – 31 May 2018
- President: Mamnoon Hussain
- Preceded by: Nawaz Sharif
- Succeeded by: Nasirul Mulk

Chairman of Awaam Pakistan
- Incumbent
- Assumed office 23 June 2024
- Deputy: Miftah Ismail
- Preceded by: Zafar Mirza

Minister for Petroleum and Natural Resources
- In office 7 June 2013 – 28 July 2017
- Prime Minister: Nawaz Sharif
- Preceded by: Asim Hussain
- Succeeded by: Himself (petroleum division); Awais Leghari (power division)

Minister for Commerce
- In office 31 March 2008 – 13 May 2008
- Prime Minister: Yusuf Raza Gillani
- Preceded by: Humayun Akhtar Khan
- Succeeded by: Ameen Faheem

Chairperson Pakistan International Airlines
- In office 27 December 1997 – 12 October 1999
- Prime Minister: Nawaz Sharif
- Preceded by: Farooq Umar
- Succeeded by: Ahmad Saeed

Member of the National Assembly of Pakistan
- In office 1 November 2018 – 10 August 2023
- Preceded by: Hamza Shehbaz
- Constituency: NA-124 (Lahore-II)
- Majority: 47,533 (40.07%)
- In office 17 March 2008 – 31 May 2018
- Preceded by: Ghulam Murtaza Satti
- Constituency: NA-50 Rawalpindi-I
- Majority: 22,010 (10.66%)
- In office 2 December 1988 – 12 October 1999
- Preceded by: Khaqan Abbasi
- Constituency: NA-36 Rawalpindi-I
- Majority: 2,220 (22.90%)

Secretary General of PDM
- In office 20 September 2020 – 18 September 2023
- President: Fazal-ur-Rehman

Personal details
- Born: 27 December 1958 (age 67) Murree, Punjab, Pakistan
- Party: AP (2024-present)
- Other political affiliations: PMLN (1993–2023); IJI (1988–1993)
- Spouse: Samina Khaqan Abbasi (m. 1986)
- Children: 3
- Parent: Khaqan Abbasi (father)
- Relatives: Muhammad Riaz Khan (father-in-law); Sadia Abbasi (sister)
- Education: University of California, Los Angeles (BS); George Washington University (MS)
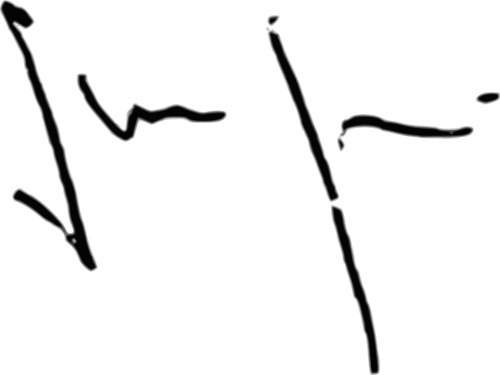
- Signature

Shahid Khaqan Abbasi (Note: Urdu: شاہد خاقان عباسی) (born 27 December 1958) is a Pakistani politician and businessman who served as the prime minister of Pakistan from August 2017 to May 2018. He also currently leads Awaam Pakistan (AP) as its chairman. Abbasi was the senior vice president of the Pakistan Muslim League-N (PML-N), and had been the secretary-general of the Pakistan Democratic Movement (PDM), an anti-PTI coalition of political parties in Pakistan. He had been a Member of the National Assembly of Pakistan from October 2018 to August 2023 and previously served as a member of the National Assembly for 8 non-consecutive terms since 1988.

Abbasi started his career after the death of his father in 1988, and since then he has been elected a Member of the National Assembly six times for Constituency NA-50 (Rawalpindi). After the PML-N victory in the 1997 general election, he served as Chairman of Pakistan International Airlines until the 1999 Pakistani coup d'état. After the formation of a temporary coalition government following the 2008 general election, he was briefly the Minister for Commerce in the Gillani ministry. After the 2013 general election, he became the Minister for Petroleum and Natural Resources in the third Sharif ministry, where he served from 2013 until the disqualification of Prime Minister Nawaz Sharif after the Panama Papers case decision in July 2017. He was elected as 21st Prime Minister of Pakistan by the National Assembly in August 2017.

== Early life and education ==
Abbasi was born on 27 December 1958 in Dewal village, Murree District, Punjab. He attended Lawrence College in Murree. In 1978, he attended the University of California, Los Angeles, where he received a bachelor's degree in electrical engineering. Following this, he began a career as an electrical engineer. In 1985, he attended George Washington University, where he gained a master's degree in electrical engineering.

After graduating from George Washington University, Abbasi became a professional electrical engineer. He worked in the United States during the 1980s before moving to Saudi Arabia, where he worked on energy projects in the oil and gas industry.

== Political career ==
=== 1988–97 ===
Abbasi's political career began after the death of his father Khaqan Abbasi in 1988. In May 1988, President Muhammad Zia-ul-Haq sacked the government of his handpicked prime minister, Muhammad Khan Junejo, and prematurely dissolved the National Assembly. Consequently, new parliamentary elections were called for 16 November 1988. Abbasi ran for the National Assembly seat from Constituency NA-36 (Rawalpindi-I), (Note: NA-36 was later renamed NA-50.) which had been held by his father until his death. Abassi was elected with 47,295 votes as an independent candidate. He acquired Rawalpindi's National Assembly seat for the first time at the age of 30 by defeating both Raja Zafar ul Haq, a candidate of Islami Jamhoori Ittehad (IJI), and Pakistan Peoples Party (PPP) candidate Raja Muhammad Anwar by a narrow margin. After winning the election he joined the IJI, which was newly founded in September 1988 by then Director-General of Inter-Services Intelligence to counter the PPP. His tenure as a Member of the National Assembly terminated after the National Assembly was dissolved prematurely in August 1990 following the dismissal of the government of Benazir Bhutto by President Ghulam Ishaq Khan.

New parliamentary elections were called for 24 October 1990. Abbasi ran for a National Assembly seat as a candidate of IJI and was successfully re-elected from Constituency NA-36 (Rawalpindi-I). He received 80,305 votes against 54,011 votes for PPP candidate Raja Muhammad Anwar. Upon the victory of IJI in the 1990 national election, he was made Federal Parliamentary Secretary for Defence, a post he retained until the dissolution of the National Assembly in April 1993 with the dismissal of the Nawaz Sharif government by then President Ghulam Ishaq Khan.

New snap elections were called for 6 October 1993. Abbasi ran for a National Assembly seat as a candidate of the Pakistan Muslim League (N) (PML-N) and was re-elected for the third time from Constituency NA-36 (Rawalpindi-I). He secured 76,596 votes against the PPP candidate, retired Colonel Habib Khan, who received 45,173 votes. As a Member of the National Assembly, he performed his duties as the chairman of the Standing Committee of the National Assembly on Defence. His tenure was terminated with the dissolution of the National Assembly in 1996 following the dismissal of the Benazir Bhutto government by President Farooq Leghari.

New parliamentary elections were called for 3 February 1997, and Abbasi successfully retained his National Assembly seat as a candidate of the PML-N from Constituency NA-36 (Rawalpindi-I) for the fourth time. He defeated Pakistan Muslim League (J) candidate Babar Awan and independent candidate Javed Iqbal Satti by securing 65,194 votes. PML-N won a clear majority in the National Assembly for the first time. That same year, he was appointed as the chairman of Pakistan International Airlines (PIA) by Prime Minister Nawaz Sharif. During his two years in this office, he is credited with implementing long-term and comprehensive reforms and getting the airline out of debt. His tenure as the Chairman of PIA was terminated following the 1999 Pakistani coup d'état, during which then-Chief of Army Staff General Pervez Musharraf overthrew Sharif and his existing elected government. Abbasi's tenure as a Member of the National Assembly was also terminated with the dissolution of the assembly. Abbasi, along with Sharif, was named in the infamous plane hijacking case. Charges were levelled against him for denying the landing of Musharraf's PIA plane at Karachi's Jinnah International Airport on its way back from Sri Lanka on 12 October 1999, and he was held responsible for conspiring with Sharif to kill Musharraf. He was forced to provide a testimonial statement against Sharif for the hijacking case, but he refused to release the statement. He was also pressured by the Pakistan Army to switch allegiance from Sharif, but he refused. He remained in jail for two years before his acquittal by the court in 2001. By then, Sharif had gone into exile in Saudi Arabia. In a 2008 interview, Abbasi claimed that Musharraf himself took control of the plane in 1999. As chairman of PIA, he was accused of Rs. 11 million in corruption in the purchase of 200 computers for the airline, however he was acquitted of this in 2008.

=== Fifth and sixth term: 2002–13 ===
General elections were held on 10 October 2002 under Musharraf. Abbasi was the PML-N candidate for the Constituency NA-50 (Rawalpindi) seat, but lost to PPP candidate Ghulam Murtaza Satti with 63,797 votes (37.21%) to 74,259 (43.31%). Abbasi indicated that the exile of Sharif disappointed the people, due to which PML-N only won 19 out of 342 seats in the National Assembly. People from his constituency claim he contested the election unwillingly, explaining why he lost it. After his defeat, he distanced himself from politics to focus on Airblue Limited, which he founded in 2003. He served as its first chairman until 2007 and then went on to become its chief operating officer.

After Sharif's return to Pakistan from exile in 2007, Abbasi joined him and ran for a seat in the National Assembly in the 18 February 2008 general election as a candidate of the PML-N, and was successfully re-elected for the fifth time with 99,987 votes from Constituency NA-50 (Rawalpindi) by defeating PPP candidate Ghulam Murtaza Satti who secured 77,978 votes. The election resulted in a hung parliament where PPP had secured the most seats in the National Assembly and PML-N the second most. After the formation of a coalition government between PPP and PML-N with Yousaf Raza Gillani as prime minister, Abbasi was inducted into the federal cabinet of Gillani with the status of a federal minister in March 2008 and was appointed as the Minister for Commerce. However, he resigned as Minister for Commerce after the PML-N left the PPP-led coalition government in May 2008 to lead the movement to impeach Pervez Musharraf and to restore the judiciary after the coalition failed to restore the judiciary, as agreed between PML-N and PPP in the Bhurban Accord. Abbasi was reported to have held the cabinet portfolio of Defence Production during his short-lived tenure as Commerce Minister, a claim later proved to be untrue.

=== As Minister for Petroleum ===
After the completion of a five-year PPP government, an election was scheduled for 11 May 2013. Abbasi ran for a seat in the National Assembly as a candidate of the PML-N and successfully retained his seat from Constituency NA-50 (Rawalpindi) for the sixth time with 134,439 votes by defeating PPP candidate Ghulam Murtaza Satti. The Express Tribune noted PML-N won the seat despite unsatisfactory performance in the constituency as Nisar Ali Khan had moved development projects allotted for Abbasi's constituency to his own constituency. Upon the victory of PML-N in the 2013 national election, he was inducted into the federal cabinet as the Minister for Petroleum and Natural Resources and was given the task of ending the Pakistan's electricity crisis. As Minister for Petroleum, he proposed to ban the usage of oil and coal-powered energy generation plants terming them expensive, and instead advocated and pushed for the liquefied natural gas (LNG) powered electricity production saying that LNG was more cheaper and would save the government billions of dollars. He claimed the government could save US$1 billion annually if 1,800MW of diesel-powered energy plants in the country were run on LNG and furnace-oil based plants would save US$600 million. In February 2016, Abbasi in his capacity as Minister for Petroleum signed US$16 billion agreement with QatarEnergy LNG for purchasing 3.75 million metric tons of LNG annually for a period of 15 years, to generate 2,000 MW of electricity and to meet 20% gas requirements of Pakistan where demand for natural gas was 8,000 MMFCD against a supply of 4,000 MMFCD. The deal which made to overcome the country's swelling power crisis was referred to as Pakistan's biggest commercial transaction ever. After the LNG contract received criticism from the opposition parties over price issue and for being non-transparent, Abbasi defended the agreement with Qatar saying Pakistan has negotiated cheapest price with Qatar. He said the contract which took 14 months of negotiation with the government of Qatar was made under his supervision and he is responsible for it.

In July 2015, Abbasi was accused of issuing illegal contracts worth Rs. 220 billion between the period of 2013 and 2015 for the import and distribution of LNG without a proper bidding process, after which the National Accountability Bureau registered a case and began an investigation. He denied the corruption allegations. The case was closed in December 2016 after it was found that all rules were followed during procurement and the bidding process to award the contract was transparent. The Express Tribune described the LNG project as successful and one of the cheapest regasifications in the world. Abbasi ceased to hold the ministerial office of Petroleum and Natural Resources on 28 July 2017 when the cabinet of Prime Minister Nawaz Sharif was disbanded following his disqualification by the Supreme Court of Pakistan in the Panama Papers case decision. To minimise the shortage of gas, and to overcome the persistent power crises in the country, Abbasi's proposal to bring the LNG to Pakistan as a source of power generation was lauded and praised. According to BBC Urdu, Abbasi had not become a part of any major political or financial controversy throughout his time in a ministerial office which is considered a high-profile cabinet slot.

== Premiership (2017–2018) ==
=== Taking office ===
Nawaz Sharif resigned as prime minister on 29 July 2017 and nominated his brother Shehbaz Sharif as his successor, but as Shehbaz was not a member of the National Assembly, he could not be immediately sworn in as prime minister. Therefore, Abbasi was chosen by Sharif as a temporary prime minister for 45 days, which would allow two months time for Shehbaz to contest elections from Nawaz's vacated constituency in Lahore, be elected to the National Assembly, and become eligible to be prime minister. BBC News noted that Abbasi was selected as the Prime Minister for two reasons. The first for being the least controversial among the PML-N leaders, and the second for having links with the Military of Pakistan. On 1 August 2017, Abbasi was elected as Prime Minister of Pakistan by the National Assembly, defeating his rival Naveed Qamar of the PPP by 221 votes to 47. Jamiat Ulema-e Islam (F) and the Muttahida Qaumi Movement also supported his election. Addressing the National Assembly after his election, he said, "I may be here for 45 days or 45 hours, but I'm not here to keep the seat warm. I intend to work and get some important things done." On that same day, he was sworn in as the Prime Minister in an oath-taking ceremony at the Presidency Palace. After he took charge, Nawaz Sharif decided that Shehbaz Sharif would remain in Punjab and Abbasi would continue as prime minister until the June 2018 general election. According to Rana Sanaullah Khan, PML-N senior leadership feared that if Shahbaz Sharif left the post of Chief Ministership of Punjab it would weaken the party's hold in the country's most populous province, which has 183 out of the 342 seats in the National Assembly and plays a crucial role in determining the successive government in Pakistan.

=== Cabinet formation ===
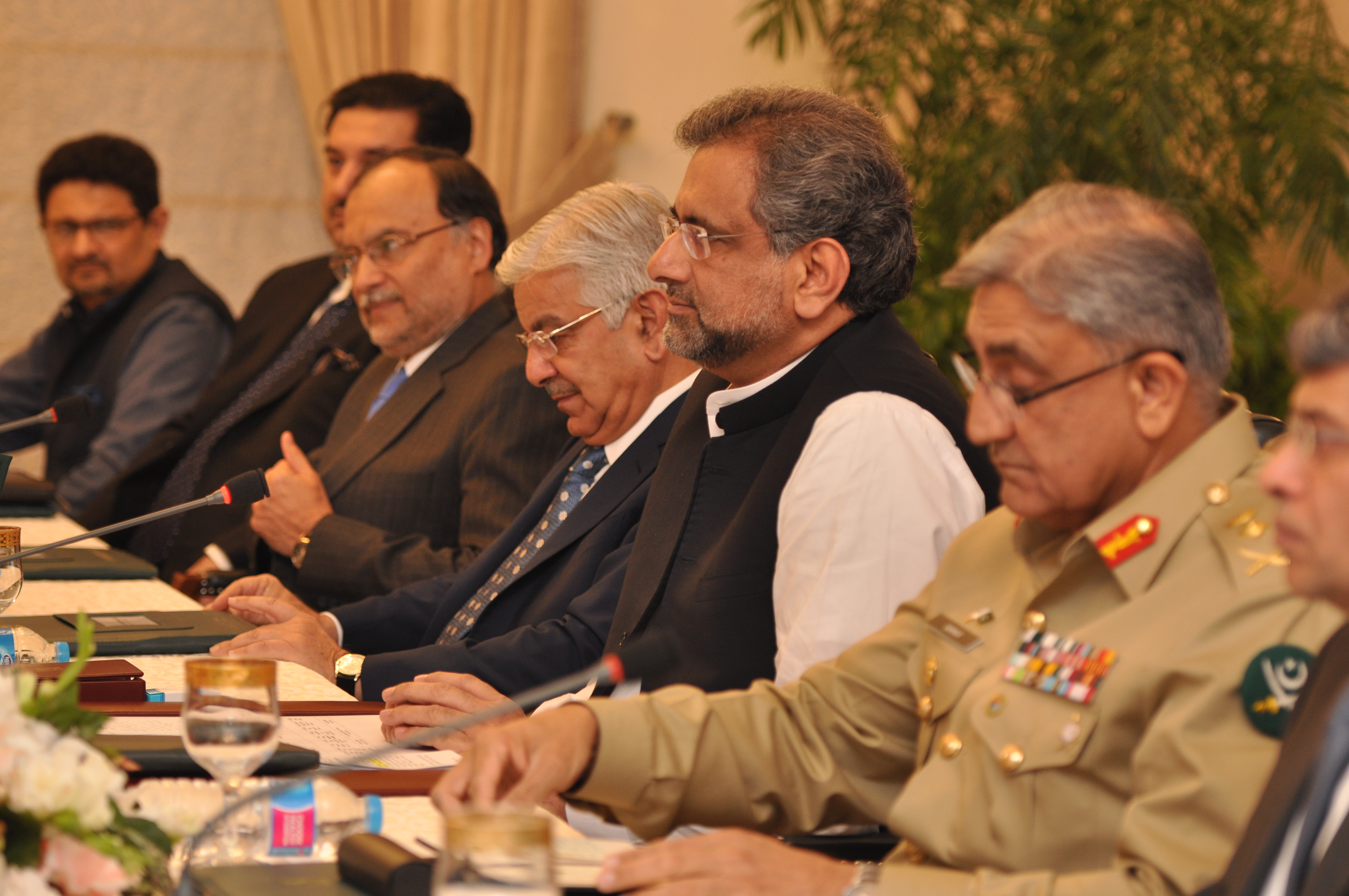
Abbasi with members of his cabinet and the Chief of Army Staff Qamar Javed Bajwa

After assuming the office as the Prime Minister, Abbasi, in consultation with Sharif, formed a 43-member cabinet. Of the 43 ministers sworn in on 4 August 2017, 27 were federal ministers and 16 were ministers of state. Except Nisar Ali Khan, Abbasi retained the entire cabinet of his predecessor Nawaz Sharif, most of whom retained their previous portfolios. Nisar Ali Khan who was Minister for Interior in the previous cabinet refused to join the cabinet of Abbasi, citing differences with the leaders of PML-N. The cabinet was criticised by Pakistan Tehreek-e-Insaf for its large size, but it was praised by The Nation. Reuters said that the cabinet "appears aimed at bolstering support" ahead of the general election. The second part of his cabinet, consisting of two federal ministers and two ministers of state, was sworn in on 10 August 2017, increasing the size of the cabinet to 47. On 13 August 2017, the cabinet was further expanded after Abbasi appointed six advisers. On the following day, five special assistants to the Prime Minister were appointed, thus increasing the cabinet size to 58. Abbasi justified the large size of his cabinet by saying that "he had limited experience of running the affairs of the government, and therefore required more ministers, advisers and special assistants." Two more advisors were added to the federal cabinet on 23 August 2017.

Abbasi appointed Khawaja Muhammad Asif as a full-time Minister for Foreign Affairs, the first since PML-N came into power in the 2013 general election. The appointment of a full-time Foreign Affair's Minister was welcomed. Previously, Nawaz Sharif had held the portfolio of the Minister for Foreign Affairs himself and was criticised for not appointing a full-fledged Foreign Minister. He also inducted a Hindu parliamentarian, Darshan Punshi, into the federal cabinet, the first in more than 20 years.

In December 2017, Abbasi appointed the Faisalabad MNA and Parliamentary Finance, Revenue and Privatization Secretary Rana Afzal Khan as the State Minister of Finance and Economic Affairs, a position left vacant by Ishaq Dar.

=== Policies and initiatives ===
In his first speech as prime minister, Abbasi announced that security, tax reform, agriculture, education, health services, infrastructure and development projects, and the country's power crisis would be his top concerns. He vowed to continue the policies of his predecessor, Nawaz Sharif, calling him the "people's prime minister" from the floor of the National Assembly. In his maiden speech, Abbasi specifically promised to widen the tax net, saying "Those who do not pay taxes and live a luxurious life will have to pay taxes now." He also called for banning automatic firearms across the country and said the federal government would seize all automatic firearms if his cabinet was to approve.

==== Energy policy ====
To improve the governance and efficiency of the government and to accommodate newly inducted cabinet members, Abbasi created seven new ministries. Amongst which the establishment of the long-awaited Ministry of Energy was praised. The Ministry was part of PML-N's 2013 election manifesto, however its formation had been delayed. Abbasi kept the cabinet portfolio of Energy Minister for himself which was created through the merger of the power wing of the Ministry of Water and Power and the Ministry of Petroleum and Natural Resources, an office Abbasi held before becoming prime minister. It was noted that formation of the Energy Ministry was the first step to solve the financial issues in the power sector.

After assuming the office of prime minister, Abbasi focus remained on energy sector and he took keen interest in the promotion of the LNG. Chairing the first meeting of the energy sector as prime minister, Abbasi directed to expedite conversion of furnace oil-powered power plants to natural gas and said that he would reduce the usage of thermal power plants and rely on the usage of domestic coal and regasified LNG for the production of energy in order to achieve a balanced energy mix. He directed the ministry to utilise the maximum usage of coal reserves from the Thar coalfield and promised to end power outages in the country by November 2017. Reuters noted that Pakistan's embrace of LNG, for which Abbasi has advocated since PML-N formed the government in June 2013, has largely been successful.

As Prime Minister, Abbasi inaugurated two LNG regasification terminals at Port Qasim made to handle the imported LNG, for which he took credit as the former Minister for Petroleum and Natural Resources taking the overall supply of LNG to 1200 million cubic feet per day. He recommitted his government to resolve the country's energy crisis saying LNG was the only inexpensive solution to overcome the Pakistan's crippling energy crisis.

In December 2017, Abbasi as part of his government's policy to promote usage of the liquefied LNG, ordered the conversion of four independent fuel-powered energy plants into LNG to reduce the cost of power generation., and imposed a ban on import of furnace oil to make maximum utilisation of LNG powered-power plants. He also ordered revamping of the transmission and distribution system and directed to find a permanent solution to Pakistan's chronic circular debt issue.

==== Domestic policy ====
Immediately after taking office, Abbasi made himself head of major cabinet committees dealing with economic matters, including those that fall under the domain of Finance Minister, to consolidate more power and to get a grip on financial issues. This usurpation minimised the powers of the Finance Minister Ishaq Dar, who was once considered as a de facto deputy prime minister under Nawaz Sharif.

On 26 August, Abbasi approved the results of the 2017 Census of Pakistan with a total population of the country excluding of that of Gilgit Baltistan and Azad Kashmir at 207.77 million. On 28 August, he restructured the eight member Council of Common Interests by increasing the seats of members from Punjab from two to four, making the council Punjab-dominated.

To speed up the development of the construction projects related to China–Pakistan Economic Corridor (CPEC), Abbasi also kept the cabinet portfolio of Ministry of Planning and Development after becoming the Prime Minister followed by forming a cabinet committee on 31 August to hold more power which eventually made the role of ministry irrelevant over CPEC-related work. But after China expressed reservations, Abbasi on 16 September assigned the portfolio back to incumbent interior minister Ahsan Iqbal who headed the Ministry of Planning and Development in the previous cabinet.

The first 30 days of Abbasi in the office suggested that he would prefer an "as-usual routine" contrary to the expectations of the business community and the bureaucracy which had initially hoped for policy changes that would attempt to resolve the outstanding issues the country was facing. Since the next general election was scheduled ten months into Abbasi's tenure as prime minister, it was noted that Abbasi would carry forward the policies and development agenda of his predecessor Nawaz Sharif and might not opt for major changes before the election when the term of the Parliament elected in 2013 was due to expire.

Abbasi visited Karachi on 12 August 2017 and pledged Rs. 25 billion and Rs. 5 billion for Karachi and Hyderabad, respectively, for infrastructure development.

On 13 September, the federal cabinet of Abbasi approved the decision to table the Federally Administered Tribal Areas (FATA) reforms bill in the National Assembly for the extension of the jurisdiction of the Supreme Court of Pakistan and the Islamabad High Court to the FATA as part of steps towards the merger of former with Khyber Pakhtunkhwa. On 12 January 2018, the National Assembly successfully passed the bill to extend the jurisdiction of the Supreme Court and the Peshawar High Court to the FATA. Upon the passage of the bill, Abbasi said "It is a historic measure for tribesmen and it can also help repeal the decades-old Frontier Crimes Regulation."

On 17 September, Abbasi approved a proposal to increase the positions of civilian director generals in Inter-Services Intelligence.

In November 2017, Abbasi took charge of the Ministry of Finance on an ad interim basis after Finance Minister Ishaq Dar went to the United Kingdom for a medical checkup in late October amid his arrest warrant in a corruption case for having wealth beyond his known sources of income, On 24 November, Ishaq Dar stepped down from the ministerial office after taking medical leave. In December 2017, it was reported that Abbasi would continue as Finance Minister until the 2018 general election, even though the ministry was suffering as Abbasi was unable to give proper attention to it. On 26 December, Abbasi appointed Federal Parliamentary Secretary for Finance Rana Afzal Khan as Minister of State for Finance and Special Assistant to the Prime Minister on Economic Affairs Miftah Ismail was elevated as Adviser to the Prime Minister on Finance, Revenue and Economic Affairs with the status of a federal minister while retaining the portfolio of Finance with himself. On 9 January 2018, Abbasi elevated his Special Assistant on Revenue Haroon Akhtar Khan as Federal Minister for Revenue and advised him to execute the tax agenda.

In November 2017, the Ministry of Interior suspended the licences for all automatic firearms across Pakistan as part of Abbasi's policy to make Pakistan free of automatic weapons. On 28 November 2017, Abbasi and Minister for Interior Ahsan Iqbal were criticised by the Chairman of the Senate of Pakistan Raza Rabbani for striking a deal with the Tehreek-e-Labaik protestors and for not taking the Senate in confidence with regards to the crackdown against them that led to resignation of Minister for Law and Justice, Zahid Hamid. On 5 December 2017, Abbasi gave his Special Assistant on Law Zafarullah Khan the responsibility to oversee the affairs of Law Ministry until the appointment of a Federal Minister for Law. On 9 January 2018, Abbasi appointed Chaudhry Mehmood Bashir as Federal Minister for Law.

On 2 January 2018, The Express Tribune commended the five month performance of Abbasi in his capacity as prime minister.

During his time in office, Abbasi has been repeatedly criticised by Imran Khan as a "puppet prime minister" of Nawaz Sharif.

On 9 January 2018, Abbasi visited Balochistan amidst a political crisis in the Provincial Assembly of Balochistan where both PML-N dissidents and opposition MPA's decided to present a motion of no confidence against Chief Ministers Nawab Sanaullah Khan Zehri. After Abbasi was unable to curb the PML-N dissidents, he advised Zehri to step down instead of facing a motion of no confidence, in order to stem the situation and to prevent the PML-N from disintegration in the province. Later that day, Zehri tendered his resignation which was immediately accepted.

On 23 January, Abbasi in an interview with Reuters confirmed his government plans to seize control of Lashkar-e-Taiba and Falah-e-Insaniat Foundation, both run by Hafiz Muhammad Saeed.

On 27 March, Abbasi in an unprecedented move, called on the Chief Justice of Pakistan, Mian Saqib Nisar.

In April 2018, Abbasi announced a tax reforms package which included reduction in income tax rates and a tax amnesty scheme for undeclared assets.

==== Foreign policy ====
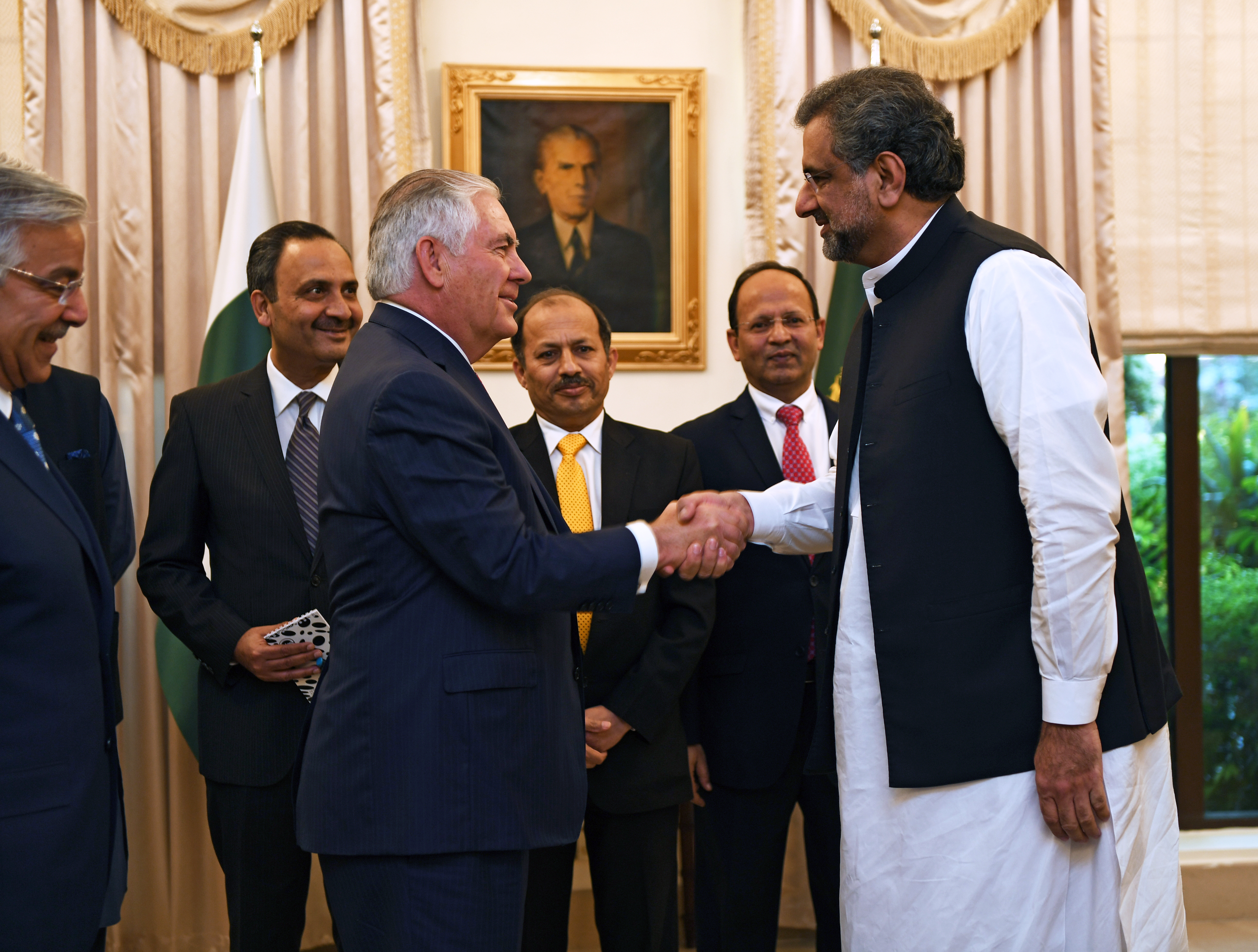
Abassi hosting Secretary Tillerson in Islamabad in October 2017

After the announcement of a new United States policy on Afghanistan by United States President Donald Trump on 21 August 2017, during which he accused Pakistan of supporting state terrorism, Abbasi made his first foreign trip as prime minister, going to Saudi Arabia on 23 August 2017 to discuss the new U.S. strategy with Crown Prince Mohammad bin Salman and to further strengthen the bilateral relations between Pakistan and Saudi Arabia, with Pakistan's relationship with the United States being strained. On 23 August, Abbasi chaired a meeting of the National Security Council (NSC) which rejected the allegations made by Trump and call the new US policy an attempt “to scapegoat Pakistan”. On 30 August, the Trump administration announced withholding US$255 million in military financial assistance to Pakistan until the latter do more to clamp down on terrorist groups operating inside the country.

In September 2017, Abbasi travelled to the United States to speak at the 72nd session of the United Nations General Assembly. During the visit, he met with Vice-president Mike Pence and also had a brief meeting with Trump. Abbasi's meeting with Pence was the highest-level meeting between the two states since Trump's new Afghanistan policy was announced in August 2017. Both Abbasi and Pence agreed to work together to carry forward the relationship between the US and Pakistan. Abbasi also met President of Iran Hassan Rouhani and President of Turkey Tayyip Erdogan on the sidelines of the assembly.

On 18 October 2017, US Vice-president Pence telephoned Abbasi to thank the government of Pakistan for the safe recovery of the Canadian-American couple Joshua Boyle and Caitlan Coleman. On 24 October, US Secretary of State Rex Tillerson made his maiden visit to Pakistan to normalise the bilateral ties which became strained over remarks of Trump in August. Tillerson met Abbasi and reiterated Trump's message that Pakistan must speed up its efforts to against terrorist groups operating within the country and described Pakistan as "incredibly important" player in the region.

On 1 December, Abbasi travelled to Russia to attend the Shanghai Cooperation Organisation summit where he met Prime Minister of Russia Dmitry Medvedev, Premier of the People's Republic of China Li Keqiang and Prime Minister of Kyrgyzstan Sapar Isakov.

After Trump acknowledged Jerusalem as Israel's capital, Abbasi attended the emergency conference of the Organisation of Islamic Cooperation on Jerusalem in Turkey on 12 December, where he condemned Trump's decision to relocate the embassy to Jerusalem and urged the United States to withdraw its decision. On 29 December, US decided to block US$255 million in security aid to Pakistan.

On 1 January 2018, the relations with United States suffered a major setback when President Trump accused Pakistan of deceit in the War on Terror, claiming the United States had "foolishly given Pakistan more than 33 billion dollars in aid over the last 15 years, and they have given us nothing but lies and deceit, thinking of our leaders as fools. They give safe haven to the terrorists we hunt in Afghanistan, with little help. No more!". The next day, Abbasi chaired a meeting of the NSC which expressed disappointment over Trump remarks and observed that Pakistan cannot be held responsible for US failure in Afghanistan. On 5 January, United States announced suspension of security aid to Pakistan which was estimated to be of at least US$2 billion. Abbasi called US aid insignificant saying “I am not sure what US aid has been talked here. The aid in the last five years at least has been less than $10m a year."

On 23 January, Abbasi travelled to Davos to attend the World Economic Forum. He was accompanied by Foreign Minister Khawaja Asif, Health Minister Saira Afzal Tarar, State Minister for Information Marriyum Aurangzeb and State Minister for Information Technology and Telecommunication Anusha Rahman.

=== Airport checking incident ===
In March 2018, while serving as Prime Minister of Pakistan, Shahid Khaqan Abbasi underwent a routine security screening at a United States airport during a private visit to the country. Footage of the screening circulated widely on social media and attracted considerable media attention in Pakistan. Abbasi later defended the incident, stating that he was not embarrassed by the security check and that complying with the laws and procedures of a foreign country did not diminish the dignity of his office. He noted that he had regularly undergone similar screenings during his visits to the United States and emphasized the importance of respecting the laws of the countries one visits.

=== Leaving the office ===
On 31 May 2018, incumbent PML-N government completed its five years term becoming the country's second civilian dispensation government to complete a five-year term in office (the other being Pakistan Peoples Party). Abbasi was succeeded by caretaker prime minister Justice Nasirul Mulk on 1 June 2018 until the country elected the new government in the 2018 general elections which were held on 25 July 2018.

It was noted that Abbasi, as prime minister, lived in his own home in Islamabad instead of living in the Prime Minister House. He was also the Highest taxpayer of Pakistan in 2018 when he was the prime minister of the country.

== Post-premiership ==
On 24 June 2018, Abbasi was allocated PML-N ticket to contest the 2018 general election from Constituency NA-57 (Rawalpindi-I). (Note: NA-57 was earlier known as NA-50.) On 27 June, Abbasi was disqualified for life by an election tribunal in Rawalpindi, under Article 62(1)(f), from contesting election following the rejection of his nomination papers after Abbasi was accused of tampering the documents. However, Abbasi challenged the verdict in Lahore High Court (LHC). On 29 June, his appeal was accepted by a two-member bench, which suspended the tribunal's order against Abbasi and allowed him to contest the election. On 14 September 2018, the appellate tribunal issued its detailed verdict on the barring of Abbasi from contesting the 2018 general election and ruled that Abbasi was not honest and sagacious and hence disqualified for life.

He ran for the seat of the National Assembly as a candidate of PML-N from Constituency NA-57 (Rawalpindi-I) in the 2018 general election, but was unsuccessful. He received 124,703 votes and lost the seat to Sadaqat Ali Abbasi. Abbasi alleged rigging was done in the constituency and filed a petition for a recount which was rejected by Returning Officer.

He was re-elected to the National Assembly as a candidate of PML-N from Constituency NA-124 (Lahore-II) in a by-election held on 14 October 2018. He took oath as a member of the National Assembly on 1 November.

Abbasi was granted bail in the Liquified Natural Gas case while Iqbal was granted bail in the Narowal Sports City complex corruption case. Abbasi was on his way to attend a press conference, accompanied by PML-N leader Ahsan Iqbal and spokesperson Marriyum Aurangzeb, when he was arrested on the Thokar Niaz Baig interchange on 18 July 2019. A sedition case was registered against him along with other Pakistan Muslim League (N) leaders in October 2020.

On 16 December 2023, he decided to leave the PML(N).

On 2 June 2024, he announced, in an interview with Rana Mubashir, that he would be launching a new party in the last weekend of June. He also announced that the name of the party would be Awaam Pakistan.

== Personal life ==
=== Family ===
Abbasi belongs to a wealthy political family and hails from Dewal village. He belongs to the Dhund Abbasi clan, which is predominant in northern Punjab.

Abbasi is married and has three sons. His father, Khaqan Abbasi, was an air commodore in the Pakistan Air Force. He entered politics and became a Member of the National Assembly and was inducted as the Federal Minister for Production in the cabinet of Muhammad Zia-ul-Haq, until his death in 1988 at Ojhri Camp in a military accident that resulted in more than 100 casualties. His brother, Zahid Abbasi, was also injured in that incident, after which he went into coma and died in 2005, having remained bedridden for 17 years. His sister Sadia Abbasi has been a member of the Senate of Pakistan. His father-in-law, General Muhammad Riaz Abbasi, was the director-general of the Inter-Services Intelligence (ISI) from 1977 to 1979.

=== Aviation and parachuting ===
He is also an aviation enthusiast and an amateur skydiver. He is the first prime minister of Pakistan to participate in a Pakistan Air Force mission by flying in an F-16 Fighting Falcon and a military helicopter. In an interview, he said he has been a pilot for more than forty years. In December 2017, he became the first prime minister of Pakistan to board a submarine in the open sea where he conducted submarine diving and surfacing procedures which earned him Pakistan Navy insignia worn by qualified submariners.

He is said to be a reserved, media-shy person.

=== Health ===
On 8 June 2020, Abbasi tested positive for COVID-19 during the coronavirus pandemic in Pakistan.

=== Wealth ===
Abbasi is a businessman and an aviation expert. He was the owner of Airblue which he founded in 2003, but in 2016 he denied being a stakeholder, saying he has not visited the airline's office for years.

He is one of the richest parliamentarians in Pakistan, with a net worth of Rs. 1.3 billion to Rs. 2.3 billion. His assets include shares in Airblue, a house in Islamabad, a hotel business, and land properties in Murree.

== Notes ==
Government offices
Preceded by Farooq Umar	Chair of Pakistan International Airlines; 1997—1999	Succeeded by Ahmad Saeed
Political offices
Preceded by Humayun Akhtar Khan	Minister for Commerce; 2008	Succeeded by Ameen Faheem
Preceded by Asim Hussain	Minister for Petroleum and Natural Resources; 2013—2017	Succeeded by Himself as Minister In-charge of Petroleum division
Preceded by Nawaz Sharif	Prime Minister of Pakistan; 2017—2018	Succeeded by Nasirul Mulk
