= 55th Regiment of Bengal Native Infantry =

Colonial military unit

The 55th Regiment of Bengal Native Infantry was a regiment of the Bengal Native Infantry and formed part of the East India Company's Bengal Army prior to the Indian rebellion of 1857. The regiments underwent frequent changes of numbering during their period of existence. The traditional formation of British and Presidency armies' regiments was by a hierarchy in which the "1st Regiment" was the oldest and the highest number was given to the youngest. In 1764, the Bengal Native Infantry regiments were renumbered in the order of the seniority of their captain.

The vast majority of the Bengal Native Infantry regiments rebelled in the Indian Rebellion of 1857.

The 55th Regiment mutinied in Nowshera and Mardan, Major Becher described this as follows: "On the 18th May the Commanding Officer of the 10th Irregular Cavalry at Nowshera reported to Brigadier Cotton that the 55th' Regiment of Native Infantry at both Nowshera and Murdan were in a state of discontent and next day Colonel Nicholson telegraphed to us at Pindee that the detachment of 10th Irregular Cavalry at Murdan showed signs of disaffection. A wing of Her Majesty's 24th was immediately ordered to march from Pindee and the garrison Attock."

The 55th like other rebellious regiments were eventually defeated by British forces, in the Punjab Mutiny Report Major Becher used the fate of the 55th Regiment as an example when dealing with a rebellious tribe: "When it should really be believed that fortune had returned to our standard, I knew that the fate of the fugitive Dhoonds would resemble that of the 55th Regiment. They would be delivered up or driven out, if they really were lurking there, so after some pause, I poured into the country all the levies I could command, amounting to some 300 men, in five principal bands, forming a ring round the base of Murree, guarding the River Jhelum, and cutting off еscape."
