= Ghulam Murtaza Satti =

Pakistani politician

Member of the National Assembly of Pakistan
- In office 2002–2007
- Constituency: NA-50 (Rawalpindi-I)
- Preceded by: Shahid Khaqan Abbasi
- Succeeded by: Shahid Khaqan Abbasi

Personal details
- Party: PPP (2023-present)
- Other political affiliations: PTI (2017-2023); PPP (2002-2017)
- Children: 4

Ghulam Murtaza Satti is a Pakistani politician and former member of the National Assembly of Pakistan.

== Political career ==
Satti was elected nazim of the Narrh union council in Kahuta Tehsil in 2000 as a candidate of Pakistan Muslim League (Q).

He was elected to the National Assembly of Pakistan from Constituency NA-50 (Rawalpindi-I) as a candidate of Pakistan Peoples Party (PPP) in the 2002 Pakistani general election. He defeated Shahid Khaqan Abbasi.

He ran for the seat of the National Assembly from Constituency NA-50 (Rawalpindi-I) as a candidate of PPP in the 2008 Pakistani general election, but was unsuccessful. He received 77978 votes and lost the seat to Shahid Khaqan Abbasi.

He ran for the seat of the National Assembly from Constituency NA-50 (Rawalpindi-I) as a candidate of PPP in the 2013 Pakistani general election, but was unsuccessful. He received 45203 votes and lost the seat to Shahid Khaqan Abbasi.

He joined Pakistan Tehreek-e-Insaf in 2017. He ran for the seat of the Punjab Assembly from Constituency PP-07 as a candidate of PTI in 2018 Pakistani general election, but was unsuccessful. He received 40528 votes and lost the seat to Raja Sagheer Ahmed
