= Sadaqat Ali Abbasi =

Pakistani politician

Muhammad Sadaqat Ali Abbasi

Member of the National Assembly of Pakistan
- In office 13 August 2018 – 17 January 2023
- Constituency: NA-57 (Rawalpindi-I)

Personal details
- Born: Rawalpindi, Punjab, Pakistan
- Party: IPP (2025-present)
- Other political affiliations: PTI (2013-2023)

Sadaqat Ali Abbasi (Urdu: سردار صداقت علی عباسی) is a Pakistani politician who had been a member of the National Assembly of Pakistan from August 2018 till January 2023.

== Education ==
He has a degree of Master of Science in economics which he received from the International Islamic University, Islamabad. He also has a degree of Master of Philosophy in economics as well a degree of Master of Science in IT.

Prior to entering politics, he taught economics to A Levels students in Islamabad and served as the Pakistan Tehreek-e-Insaf head of Khyber Pakhtunkhwa's education think-tank.

== Political career ==
He is candidate of the Pakistan Tehreek-e-Insaf (PTI) from NA-57 Rawalpindi-I in the 2018 Pakistani general election. He received 136,249 votes and defeated former Prime Minister Shahid Khaqan Abbasi.
