= Ojhri Camp disaster =

1988 ammunition depot explosion in Rawalpindi, Punjab Province, Pakistan

Coordinates: 33°39′27″N 73°05′18″E

- Date: 10 April 1988
- Time: 10:30am (PKT)
- Venue: Rawalpindi City
- Location: Rawalpindi, Punjab, Pakistan
- Type: Ammunition explosion
- Deaths: 93

The Ojhri Camp disaster (Urdu: اوجھڑی کیمپ) took place on 10 April 1988. Ojhri Camp was a military storage center located in Rawalpindi City in Rawalpindi, Punjab Province of Pakistan. Following the disaster, then-Prime Minister Junejo ordered an inquiry into the events, culminating in President Zia-ul-Haq sacking him and dissolving Parliament.

== Events ==
=== Camp Explosion ===
On April 10, 1988, at about 10:30 AM, the camp which was used as an ammunition depot for Afghan mujahideen fighting against Soviet forces in Afghanistan, exploded, killing many in Rawalpindi and Islamabad as a result of rockets and other munitions expelled by the blast. At the time, The New York Times reported more than 93 dead and another 1,100 wounded; many believe that the toll was much higher. A total of 10,000 tons of arms and ammunition were involved in the explosion.

The initial blast was started by a small fire created by a box of Egyptian rockets which had been armed with fuses prior to shipment contrary to safety protocol. The rockets had been sent by the United States Central Intelligence Agency to the Pakistani Inter-Services Intelligence (ISI) for delivery to the mujahideen commanders as part of Operation Cyclone. There was an eight to ten minute delay between the start of the fire and the explosion. The previous year, a fire had been started by leaky white phosphorus grenades but was extinguished promptly, preventing an explosion.

=== Reactions ===
U.S. Defense Department officials said that they believed that the explosion at Ojhri Camp was the work of the Soviet Union and the pro-Soviet regime in Kabul, as the explosion resembled the pattern of previous attacks by the Soviet Union and the Kabul regime against civilians and military installations in Pakistan.

However, there were also some speculations that the camp was deliberately blown up to cover up the theft of weapons from the stocks. Furthermore, Brigadier Mohammad Yousaf, who oversaw the operations of the mujahideen in his role as the head of the ISI's Afghan Bureau from 1983 to 1987, suggested that while the Soviets had the most obvious motive, the CIA may also have had a hand in the explosion, as an Islamic fundamentalist government in Kabul was just as dangerous as a communist one to US interests.

=== Junejo Response and Sacking ===
Following the disaster, Prime Minister, Mohammad Khan Junejo ordered a parliamentary inquiry into the Ojhri camp disaster. Former civil-servant Salman Faruqui says the call for inquiry was the "final nail in the coffin" for the Zia-Junejo relationship, while Yusuf Zaman of The Friday Times called it the "final straw which broke the camel’s back"; contributing to the dismissal of the National Assembly and removal of Junejo from the office of Prime Minister. The Ojhri Camp disaster also occurred on the eve of the signing of the Geneva Accords which further accelerated conflict between President Zia and Junejo.

== Aftermath ==
The Geneva Accords were signed just 4 days later, and the Soviets were able to withdraw without any major ambushes, claiming only one casualty on their retreat. This event hindered the mujahideen's capability to fill the power vacuum, as their weapons reserves were depleted and the CIA cut back their shipment of arms until December.

Khaqan Abbasi, the father of future Prime Minister of Pakistan Shahid Khaqan Abbasi, died in the disaster as his car was hit by a missile, while his son Zahid Khaqan Abbasi suffered head injuries as a result of missile shrapnel piercing his skull, after which he went into a coma and died in 2005, having remained bedridden for 17 years.

== See also ==
- Spillover of Soviet - Afghan war in Pakistan
