= Sherbaz Khan =

Leader of the Abbasi tribe (died 1857)

- Sardar Baz khan Sadozai
- Died: 1857; Murree

Sardar Sherbaz Khan , also known as Baz Khan, was a leader of the Dhund Abbasi tribe of Northern Punjab during the time of the British Raj. He was the son of Fateh Noor Khan - reportedly an influential member of the tribe.

Sherbaz Khan planned to attack the British settlement of Murree in July 1857 during the uprising against British colonial rule - with a force of 300 men, but his plans were leaked to the British and his plans were thwarted, and he was captured by the British. He was subsequently tried, sentenced and hanged him placed in front of cannons and shot to bits.
