= Khaqan Abbasi =

Pakistani Air Force Officer and later Minister

- خاقان عباسی

Minister for Industries and Production
- In office 1985–1988

Member of the National Assembly for the 36th
- In office 1985–1988
- Preceded by: Raja Zafar ul Haq
- Succeeded by: Shahid Khaqan Abbasi

Personal details
- Died: 10 April 1988 Ojhri Camp, Rawalpindi, Punjab
- Children: Shahid Khaqan Abbasi; Sadia Abbasi

Military service
- Allegiance: Pakistan
- Branch/service: Pakistan Air Force
- Years of service: –1988
- Unit: Pakistan Air Force

Khaqan Abbasi (Urdu: خاقان عباسی) was a Pakistani politician who served as Federal Minister for Production in Prime Minister Muhammad Khan Junejo's cabinet until 1988. He was the father of Shahid Khaqan Abbasi, former Prime Minister of Pakistan, and Sadia Abbasi.

He was a decorated Air Force Veteran and retired as an Air Commodore in 1978. He then moved to Jordan and served as the advisor of the Royal Jordanian Air Force. With the support of then King of Jordan, he undertook construction projects in Saudi Arabia which turned him into a billionaire.

He was elected to the National Assembly of Pakistan from NA-36 Rawalpindi-I in the 1985 Pakistani general election by defeating Raja Zafar ul Haq. He was inducted into the federal cabinet of Prime Minister Muhammad Khan Junejo due to close relationship with Zia-ul-Haq and was appointed Minister for production but was later removed from the cabinet after Prime Minister Junejo and Zia-ul-Haq developed differences.

He died, on April 10, 1988, when he was on his way to his hometown Murree, when his car was hit by a missile in the Ojhri Camp disaster.
