= Raja Shafqat Khan Abbasi =

Pakistani Politician

Raja Muhammad Shafqat Khan Abbasi is a Pakistani politician and a former member of the Provincial Assembly of Punjab, from 25 November 2002 to 10 October 2007.

== Biography ==
Abbasi was born on 3 March 1963 in Murree. He earned an LL.B. (Hons) degree in 1988 from the International Islamic University and an M.A. in Political Science in 1989 from the University of the Punjab.

He held the position of General Secretary of the Islamabad Bar Association in 1992. Later, he was elected as a Member of the Punjab Bar Council in 2000 for a five-year term and subsequently became the Chairman of the Punjab Bar Council in 2001.

He was elected to the Provincial Assembly of Punjab as a candidate of Pakistan People's Party (PPP) from Constituency PP-1 (Rawalpindi-I) in the 2002 Pakistani general election.

In 2009, he was appointed as a judge of the Lahore High Court.
