= Raja Usama Sarwar =

Member of the National Assembly of Pakistan from Murree (2024–2029)

Raja Osama Ashfaq Sarwar
- راجہ اسامہ اشفاق سرور

Member of the National Assembly of Pakistan
- Incumbent
- Assumed office 29 February 2024
- Constituency: NA-51 Murree-cum-Rawalpindi

Personal details
- Party: PMLN (2024-present)

Raja Osama Ashfaq Sarwar (Urdu: راجہ اسامہ اشفاق سرور) is a Pakistani politician who has been a member of the National Assembly of Pakistan since February 2024.

== Political career ==
Sarwar won the 2024 Pakistani general election from NA-51 Murree-cum-Rawalpindi as a Pakistan Muslim League (N) candidate. He received 149,250 votes while runners up Independent supported (PTI) Pakistan Tehreek-e-Insaf, candidate Muhammad Latasib Satti received 113,843 votes.
