= Mehreen Anwar Raja =

Pakistani politician

Member of the National Assembly of Pakistan
- In office 2008–2013
- Constituency: Reserved seat for women

Personal details
- Other political affiliations: PPP (2002-2025)

Mehreen Anwar Raja is a Pakistani politician who has served as member of the National Assembly of Pakistan.

== Political career ==
She was elected to the National Assembly of Pakistan as a candidate of Pakistan Peoples Party on a reserved seats for women from Punjab in the 2002 Pakistani general election.

She was elected to the National Assembly of Pakistan as a candidate of Pakistan Peoples Party on a reserved seats for women from Punjab in the 2008 Pakistani general election and was inducted into the federal cabinet of Prime Minister Yousaf Raza Gillani and was made Minister of State for Parliamentary Affairs.
