= Sadia Abbasi =

Pakistani barrister and politician

Member of the Senate of Pakistan
- In office 12 March 2018 – 17 October 2018
- In office March 2003 – February 2009
- In office March 2021 – March 2024

Personal details
- Citizenship: Pakistani; American (until 2018)
- Party: AP (2024-present)
- Other political affiliations: PMLN (2003-2024)
- Relatives: Shahid Khaqan Abbasi (brother)

Sadia Khaqan Abbasi (Urdu: سعدیہ عباسی) is a Pakistani barrister and politician who is currently a member of the country's Senate, having been elected on a reserved seat for women in March 2021. She was previously elected as a senator in 2018 and 2003. In October 2018, she was disqualified as a senator by the Supreme Court of Pakistan on the basis of having dual nationality (Pakistan and USA), in violation of the country's Constitution. She is the sister of former Prime Minister, Shahid Khaqan Abbasi.

== Political career ==
Abbasi was elected to the Senate of Pakistan as a candidate of Pakistan Muslim League (N) (PML-N) on a reserved seat for women from Punjab in the March 2003 Senate election.

In February 2009, she quit PML-N and resigned from her Senate seat shortly before the expiry of her term in the Senate after PML-N refused to issue her a ticket for the March 2009 Senate election.

In December 2011, she joined Pakistan Tehreek-e-Insaf in absentia.

She was nominated by PML-N as its candidate in the 2018 Pakistani Senate election. However the Election Commission of Pakistan declared all PML-N candidates for the Senate election as independent after a ruling of the Supreme Court of Pakistan.

She was re-elected to the Senate as an independent candidate on a reserved seat for women from Punjab in the Senate election. She joined the treasury benches, led by PML-N after getting elected. She took oath as Senator on 12 March 2018.

On 17 October 2018, the Supreme Court of Pakistan disqualified the Senate membership of Abbasi over dual nationality.

=== 2021 - 2021 ===
Abbasi was elected to the Senate for a third, 6-year term on a reserve seat for women from Punjab in March 2021. She is a member of the following standing committees: Cabinet Secretariat, Petroleum, Planning, Development and Special Initiatives, Finance, Revenue and Economic Affairs and Foreign Affairs. In late 2021, in the Senate Standing Committee on Law and Justice, she tabled 2 proposed amendments to the Constitution including declaring a women's right to inheritance as a fundamental right. The proposed amendment read, “no women shall be deprived of her share from the inheritance in Pakistan” but was rejected by the committee.
